= List of airports by IATA code: W =

IATA	ICAO	Airport name	Location served
-WA-
WAA	PAIW	Wales Airport	Wales, Alaska, United States
WAB		~~Wabag Airport~~	Wabag, Papua New Guinea
WAC	HAWC	Wacca Airport	Wacca, Ethiopia
WAD		Andriamena Airport	Andriamena, Madagascar
WAE	OEWD	Wadi al-Dawasir Domestic Airport	Wadi ad-Dawasir (Wadi al-Dawaser), Saudi Arabia
WAF	OPWN	Wana Airport	Wana, Pakistan
WAG	NZWU	Whanganui Airport	Whanganui, New Zealand
WAH	KBWP	Harry Stern Airport (FAA: BWP)	Wahpeton, North Dakota, United States
WAI	FMNW	Ambalabe Airport	Antsohihy, Madagascar
WAJ	AYWF	Wawoi Falls Airport	Wawoi Falls, Papua New Guinea
WAK	FMSZ	Ankazoabo Airport	Ankazoabo, Madagascar
WAL	KWAL	Wallops Flight Facility	Wallops Island, Virginia, United States
WAM	FMMZ	Ambatondrazaka Airport	Ambatondrazaka, Madagascar
WAO	AYWB	Wabo Airport	Wabo, Papua New Guinea
WAP	SCAP	Alto Palena Airfield	Palena, Chile
WAQ	FMMG	Antsalova Airport	Antsalova, Madagascar
WAR	WAJR	Waris Airport	Waris, Indonesia
WAS		metropolitan area^{1}	Washington, D.C., United States
WAT	EIWF	Waterford Airport	Waterford, Ireland
WAU		Wauchope Airport	Wauchope, New South Wales, Australia
WAV	YWAV	Wave Hill Airport	Kalkarindji (Wave Hill), Northern Territory, Australia
WAW	EPWA	Warsaw Chopin Airport	Warsaw, Poland
WAX	HLZW	Zuwarah Airport	Zuwarah (Zuara), Libya
WAY	KWAY	Greene County Airport	Waynesburg, Pennsylvania, United States
WAZ	YWCK	Warwick Airport	Warwick, Queensland, Australia
-WB-
WBA	WAPV	Wahai Airport	Seram Island, Indonesia
WBB		Stebbins Airport	Stebbins, Alaska, United States
WBC		Wapolu Airport	Wapolu, Papua New Guinea
WBD	FMNF	Befandriana Airport	Befandriana-Avaratra, Madagascar
WBE		Ankaizina Airport	Bealanana, Madagascar
WBG	ETNS	Schleswig Air Base	Schleswig, Schleswig-Holstein, Germany
WBK		West Branch Community Airport (FAA: Y31)	West Branch, Michigan, United States
WBM	AYWD	Wapenamanda Airport	Wapenamanda, Papua New Guinea
WBO	FMSB	Antsoa Airport	Beroroha, Madagascar
WBQ	PAWB	Beaver Airport	Beaver, Alaska, United States
WBR	KRQB	Roben–Hood Airport (FAA: RQB)	Big Rapids, Michigan, United States
WBU	KBDU	Boulder Municipal Airport (FAA: BDU)	Boulder, Colorado, United States
WBW	KWBW	Wilkes-Barre Wyoming Valley Airport	Wilkes-Barre, Pennsylvania, United States
-WC-
WCA	SCST	Gamboa Airport	Castro, Chile
WCD	YSCD	Carosue Dam Airport	Cundeelee, Western Australia, Australia
WCH	SCTN	Nuevo Chaitén Airport	Chaitén, Chile
WCR	PALR	Chandalar Lake Airport	Chandalar Lake, Alaska, United States
-WD-
WDA		Wadi Ain Airport	Wadi Ain, Yemen
WDB	WAEH	Weda Bay Airport	Central Weda, North Maluku, Indonesia
WDG	KWDG	Enid Woodring Regional Airport	Enid, Oklahoma, United States
WDH	FYWH	Hosea Kutako International Airport	Windhoek, Namibia
WDI	YWND	Wondai Airport	Wondai, Queensland, Australia
WDN		Waldronaire Airport (FAA: 90WA)	Waldron Island, Washington, United States
WDR	KWDR	Barrow County Airport	Winder, Georgia, United States
WDS	ZHSY	Shiyan Wudangshan Airport	Shiyan, Hubei, China
-WE-
WEA	KWEA	Parker County Airport	Weatherford, Texas, United States
WED		Wedau Airport	Wedau, Papua New Guinea
WEF	ZSWF	Weifang Airport	Weifang, Shandong, China
WEH	ZSWH	Weihai Dashuibo Airport	Weihai, Shandong, China
WEI	YBWP	Weipa Airport	Weipa, Queensland, Australia
WEL	FAWM	Welkom Airport	Welkom, South Africa
WEP		Weam Airport	Weam, Papua New Guinea
WET	WABG	Waghete Airport	Waghete, Indonesia
WEW	YWWA	Wee Waa Airport	Wee Waa, New South Wales, Australia
-WF-
WFB		Ketchikan Harbor Seaplane Base (FAA: 5KE)	Ketchikan, Alaska, United States
WFD	EGCD	Woodford Aerodrome	Woodford, England, United Kingdom
WFI	FMSF	Fianarantsoa Airport	Fianarantsoa, Madagascar
WFK	KFVE	Northern Aroostook Regional Airport (FAA: FVE)	Frenchville, Maine, United States
-WG-
WGA	YSWG	Wagga Wagga Airport	Wagga Wagga, New South Wales, Australia
WGC	VOWA	Warangal Airport	Warangal, Telangana, India
WGE	YWLG	Walgett Airport	Walgett, New South Wales, Australia
WGN	ZGSY	Shaoyang Wugang Airport	Shaoyang, Hunan, China
WGO	KOKV	Winchester Regional Airport (FAA: OKV)	Winchester, Virginia, United States
WGP	WADW	Mau Hau Airport (Umbu Mehang Kunda Airport)	Waingapu, Indonesia
WGT	YWGT	Wangaratta Airport	Wangaratta, Victoria, Australia
WGU		Wagau Airport	Wagau, Papua New Guinea
~~WGY~~		~~Wagny Airport~~	Wagny, Gabon
-WH-
WHA	ZSWA	Wuhu Xuanzhou Airport	Wuhu, Anhui, China
WHB	YEWK	Eliwana Camp Airport	Eliwana, Western Australia, Australia
WHD		Hyder Seaplane Base (FAA: 4Z7)	Hyder, Alaska, United States
WHF	HSSW	Wadi Halfa Airport	Wadi Halfa, Sudan
WHK	NZWK	Whakatāne Airport	Whakatane, New Zealand
WHL		Welshpool Airport	Welshpool, Victoria, Australia
WHN		Wuhan Hannan General Airport	Wuhan, Hubei, China
WHO		Franz Josef Glacier Aerodrome	Franz Josef Glacier, New Zealand
WHP	KWHP	Whiteman Airport	Los Angeles, California, United States
WHS	EGEH	Whalsay Airstrip	Whalsay, Scotland, United Kingdom
WHT	KARM	Wharton Regional Airport (FAA: ARM)	Wharton, Texas, United States
WHU	ZSWU	Wuhu Wanli Airport	Wuhu, Anhui, China
-WI-
WIB		Wilbarger County Airport (FAA: F05)	Vernon, Texas, United States
WIC	EGPC	Wick Airport	Wick, Scotland, United Kingdom
WIE	ETOU	Wiesbaden Army Airfield	Wiesbaden, Hesse, Germany
WIK	NZKE	Waiheke Island Aerodrome	Waiheke Island, New Zealand
WIL	HKNW	Wilson Airport	Nairobi, Kenya
WIN	YWTN	Winton Airport	Winton, Queensland, Australia
WIO	YWCA	Wilcannia Airport	Wilcannia, New South Wales, Australia
WIR	NZWO	Wairoa Aerodrome	Wairoa, New Zealand
WIT	~~YWIT~~	~~Wittenoom Airport~~	Wittenoom, Western Australia, Australia
WIU		Witu Airport	Witu, Papua New Guinea
-WJ-
WJA		Woja Airport	Woja, Ailinglaplap Atoll, Marshall Islands
WJF	KWJF	General William J. Fox Airfield	Lancaster, California, United States
WJR	HKWJ	Wajir Airport	Wajir, Kenya
WJU	RKNW	Wonju Airport	Wonju, South Korea
-WK-
WKA	NZWF	Wānaka Airport	Wanaka, New Zealand
WKB	YWKB	Warracknabeal Airport	Warracknabeal, Victoria, Australia
WKF	FAWK	Air Force Base Waterkloof	Pretoria, South Africa
WKI	FVWT	Hwange Town Airport	Hwange, Zimbabwe
WKJ	RJCW	Wakkanai Airport	Wakkanai, Hokkaido, Japan
WKK		Aleknagik Airport (FAA: 5A8)	Aleknagik, Alaska, United States
WKN		Wakunai Airport	Wakunai, Papua New Guinea
WKR	MYAW	Walker's Cay Airport	Walker's Cay, Abaco Islands, Bahamas
-WL-
WLA	YWAL	Wallal Airport	Wallal (Wallal Downs), Western Australia, Australia
WLC	YWCH	Walcha Airport	Walcha, New South Wales, Australia
WLD	KWLD	Strother Field	Winfield / Arkansas City, Kansas, United States
WLE	YMLS	Miles Airport	Miles, Queensland, Australia
WLG	NZWN	Wellington Airport	Wellington, New Zealand
WLH	NVSW	Walaha Airport	Walaha, Vanuatu
WLK	PASK	Selawik Airport	Selawik, Alaska, United States
WLL	YWOR	Wollogorang Airport	Wollogorang Station, Northern Territory, Australia
WLO	YWTL	Waterloo Airport	Waterloo, Northern Territory, Australia
WLP	YANG	West Angelas Airport	West Angelas, Western Australia, Australia
WLR		Loring Seaplane Base (FAA: 13Z)	Loring, Alaska, United States
WLS	NLWW	Hihifo Airport	Wallis Island, Wallis and Futuna
WLW	KWLW	Willows-Glenn County Airport	Willows, California, United States
-WM-
WMA	FMNX	Mandritsara Airport	Mandritsara, Madagascar
WMB	YWBL	Warrnambool Airport	Warrnambool, Victoria, Australia
WMC	KWMC	Winnemucca Municipal Airport	Winnemucca, Nevada, United States
WMD	FMSC	Mandabe Airport	Mandabe, Madagascar
WME	YMNE	Mount Keith Airport	Mount Keith, Western Australia, Australia
WMH	KBPK	Ozark Regional Airport (FAA: BPK)	Mountain Home, Arkansas, United States
WMI	EPMO	Warsaw Modlin Airport	Warsaw, Poland
WMK		Meyers Chuck Seaplane Base (FAA: 84K)	Meyers Chuck, Alaska, United States
WML	FMMC	Malaimbandy Airport	Malaimbandy, Madagascar
WMN	FMNR	Maroantsetra Airport	Maroantsetra, Madagascar
WMO	PAWM	White Mountain Airport	White Mountain, Alaska, United States
WMP	FMNP	Mampikony Airport	Mampikony, Madagascar
WMR	FMNC	Mananara Nord Airport	Mananara Nord (Mananara Avaratra), Madagascar
WMT	ZUMT	Zunyi Maotai Airport	Renhuai, China
WMV		Madirovalo Airport	Madirovalo, Madagascar
WMX	WAVV	Wamena Airport	Wamena, Indonesia
-WN-
WNA	PANA	Napakiak Airport	Napakiak, Alaska, United States
WND		Windarra Airport	Windarra, Western Australia, Australia
WNE		Wora na Yeno Airport	Wora na Yeno, Gabon
WNH	ZPWS	Wenshan Puzhehei Airport	Wenshan, Yunnan, China
WNI	WAWD	Matahora Airport	Wangi-wangi Island, Southeast Sulawesi, Indonesia
WNN		Wunnummin Lake Airport (TC: CKL3)	Wunnumin Lake, Ontario, Canada
WNP	RPUN	Naga Airport	Naga, Philippines
WNR	YWDH	Windorah Airport	Windorah, Queensland, Australia
WNS	OPNH	Nawabshah Airport	Nawabshah (Shaheed Benazirabad), Pakistan
WNU		Wanuma Airport	Wanuma, Papua New Guinea
WNZ	ZSWZ	Wenzhou Longwan International Airport	Wenzhou, Zhejiang, China
-WO-
WOA		Wonenara Airport	Wonenara, Papua New Guinea
WOE	EHWO	Woensdrecht Air Base	Bergen op Zoom, Netherlands
WOK	SVUQ	Uonquén Airport	Uonquén, Venezuela
WOL	YWOL	Shellharbour Airport	Shellharbour, New South Wales, Australia
WON	YWDL	Wondoola Airport	Wondoola, Queensland, Australia
WOR		Moramba Airport	Ankorefo, Madagascar
WOS	ZKWS	Wonsan Kalma International Airport	Wonsan, North Korea
WOT	RCWA	Wang-an Airport	Wang'an, Taiwan
WOW	PAUO	Willow Airport (FAA: UUO)	Willow, Alaska, United States
-WP-
WPA	SCAS	Cabo Juan Román Airfield	Puerto Aisén, Chile
WPB	FMNG	Port Bergé Airport	Boriziny (Port Bergé), Madagascar
WPC	CZPC	Pincher Creek Airport	Pincher Creek, Alberta, Canada
WPK	YWMP	Wrotham Park Airport	Wrotham Park, Queensland, Australia
WPL		Powell Lake Water Aerodrome (TC: CAQ8)	Powell River, British Columbia, Canada
WPM	AYXP	Wipim Airport	Wipim, Papua New Guinea
WPO		North Fork Valley Airport (FAA: 7V2)	Paonia, Colorado, United States
WPR	SCFM	Capitán Fuentes Martínez Airport	Porvenir, Chile
WPU	SCGZ	Guardiamarina Zañartu Airport	Puerto Williams, Chile
-WR-
WRA	HAWR	Warder Airport	Werder (Warder), Ethiopia
WRB	KWRB	Robins Air Force Base	Warner Robins, Georgia, United States
WRE	NZWR	Whangarei Airport	Whangarei, New Zealand
WRG	PAWG	Wrangell Airport	Wrangell, Alaska, United States
WRI	KWRI	McGuire Air Force Base	Wrightstown, New Jersey, United States
WRL	KWRL	Worland Municipal Airport	Worland, Wyoming, United States
WRN	YWDG	Windarling Airport	Windarling, Western Australia, Australia
WRO	EPWR	Wrocław Airport	Wrocław, Poland
WRT	EGNO	Warton Aerodrome	Warton, England, United Kingdom
WRW	YWWG	Warrawagine Airport	Warrawagine Station, Western Australia, Australia
WRY	EGEW	Westray Airport	Westray, Scotland, United Kingdom
WRZ	VCCW	Weerawila Airport	Weerawila, Sri Lanka
-WS-
WSA		Wasua Airport	Wasua, Papua New Guinea
WSB		Steamboat Bay Seaplane Base	Steamboat Bay, Alaska, United States
WSD	KWSD	Condron Army Airfield	White Sands, New Mexico, United States
WSF	PACS	Cape Sarichef Airport (FAA: 26AK)	Cape Sarichef, Alaska, United States
WSG	KAFJ	Washington County Airport (FAA: AFJ)	Washington, Pennsylvania, United States
WSH	KHWV	Brookhaven Airport (FAA: HWV)	Shirley, New York, United States
WSI	YSWS	Western Sydney Airport (Nancy-Bird Walton Airport)	Sydney, Australia
WSK	ZUWS	Chongqing Wushan Airport	Wushan, Chongqing, China
WSM		Wiseman Airport	Wiseman, Alaska, United States
WSN	PFWS	South Naknek Airport	South Naknek, Alaska, United States
WSO	SMWS	Washabo Airport	Washabo (Wasjabo), Suriname
WSP	MNWP	Waspam Airport	Waspam, Nicaragua
WSR	WASW	Wasior Airport	Wasior, Indonesia
WST	KWST	Westerly State Airport	Westerly, Rhode Island, United States
WSU		Wasu Airport	Wasu, Papua New Guinea
WSX		Westsound Seaplane Base (FAA: WA83)	West Sound, Washington, United States
WSY	YSHR	Whitsunday Airport	Airlie Beach / Shute Harbour, Queensland, Australia
WSZ	NZWS	Westport Airport	Westport, New Zealand
-WT-
WTA	FMMU	Tambohorano Airport	Tambohorano, Madagascar
WTB	YBWW	Toowoomba Wellcamp Airport	Toowoomba, Queensland, Australia
WTD	MYGW	West End Airport	West End, Grand Bahama, Bahamas
WTE		Wotje Airport (FAA: N36)	Wotje Atoll, Marshall Islands
WTK	PAWN	Noatak Airport	Noatak, Alaska, United States
WTL		Tuntutuliak Airport (FAA: A61)	Tuntutuliak, Alaska, United States
WTN	EGXW	RAF Waddington	Waddington, England, United Kingdom
WTO		Wotho Airport	Wotho Atoll, Marshall Islands
WTP	AYWT	Woitape Airport	Woitape, Papua New Guinea
WTR		Whiteriver Airport (FAA: E24)	Whiteriver, Arizona, United States
WTS	FMMX	Tsiroanomandidy Airport	Tsiroanomandidy, Madagascar
WTT		Wantoat Airport	Wantoat, Papua New Guinea
WTZ	NZWT	Whitianga Aerodrome	Whitianga, New Zealand
-WU-
WUA	ZBUH	Wuhai Airport	Wuhai, Inner Mongolia, China
WUD	YWUD	Wudinna Airport	Wudinna, South Australia, Australia
WUG	AYWU	Wau Airport	Wau, Papua New Guinea
WUH	ZHHH	Wuhan Tianhe International Airport	Wuhan, Hubei, China
WUI	YMMI	Murrin Murrin Airport	Murrin Murrin, Western Australia, Australia
WUM		Wasum Airport	Wasum, Papua New Guinea
WUN	YWLU	Wiluna Airport	Wiluna, Western Australia, Australia
WUS	ZSWY	Wuyishan Airport	Wuyishan, Fujian, China
WUT	ZBXZ	Xinzhou Wutaishan Airport	Xinzhou, Shanxi, China
WUU	HSWW	Wau Airport	Wau, South Sudan
WUV		Wuvulu Island Airport	Wuvulu Island, Papua New Guinea
WUX	ZSWX	Sunan Shuofang International Airport	Wuxi / Suzhou, Jiangsu, China
WUZ		Wuzhou Xijiang Airport	Wuzhou, Guangxi, China
-WV-
WVB	FYWB	Walvis Bay Airport	Walvis Bay, Namibia
WVI	KWVI	Watsonville Municipal Airport	Watsonville, California, United States
WVK	FMSK	Manakara Airport	Manakara, Madagascar
WVL	KWVL	Waterville Robert LaFleur Airport	Waterville, Maine, United States
WVN	EDWI	JadeWeserAirport	Wilhelmshaven, Lower Saxony, Germany
-WW-
WWA	PAWS	Wasilla Airport (FAA: IYS)	Wasilla, Alaska, United States
WWD	KWWD	Cape May Airport	Wildwood, New Jersey, United States
WWI	YWWI	Woodie Woodie Airport	Woodie Woodie, Western Australia, Australia
WWK	AYWK	Wewak Airport	Wewak, Papua New Guinea
WWP		North Whale Seaplane Base (FAA: 96Z)	Whale Pass, Alaska, United States
WWR	KWWR	West Woodward Airport	Woodward, Oklahoma, United States
WWT	PAEW	Newtok Airport (FAA: EWU)	Newtok, Alaska, United States
WWY	YWWL	West Wyalong Airport	West Wyalong, New South Wales, Australia
-WX-
WXN	ZUWX	Wanzhou Wuqiao Airport	Wanzhou, Chongqing, China
-WY-
WYA	YWHA	Whyalla Airport	Whyalla, South Australia, Australia
WYB		Yes Bay Lodge Seaplane Base (FAA: 78K)	Yes Bay, Alaska, United States
WYE	GFYE	Yengema Airport	Yengema, Sierra Leone
WYN	YWYM	Wyndham Airport	Wyndham, Western Australia, Australia
WYS	KWYS	Yellowstone Airport	West Yellowstone, Montana, United States
-WZ-
WZA	DGLW	Wa Airport	Wa, Upper West Region, Ghana
WZQ		Urad Middle Banner Airport	Urad Middle Banner, Inner Mongolia, China

== Notes ==
- ^1 WAS is common IATA code for Washington Dulles International Airport (IATA: IAD), Baltimore–Washington International Airport (IATA: BWI) and Ronald Reagan Washington National Airport (IATA: DCA).
