= Maintirano District =

- District
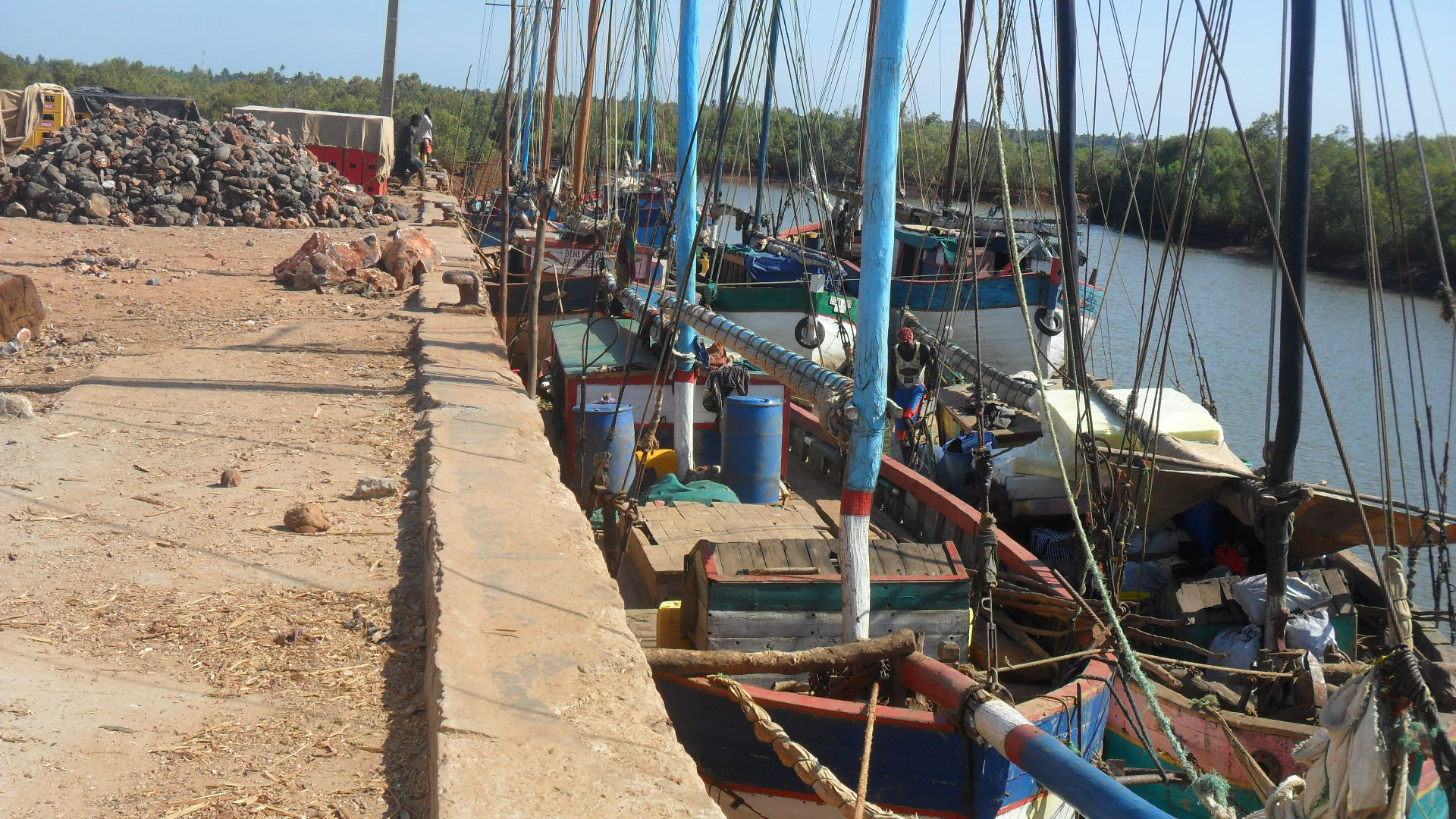
- the small port of Maintirano

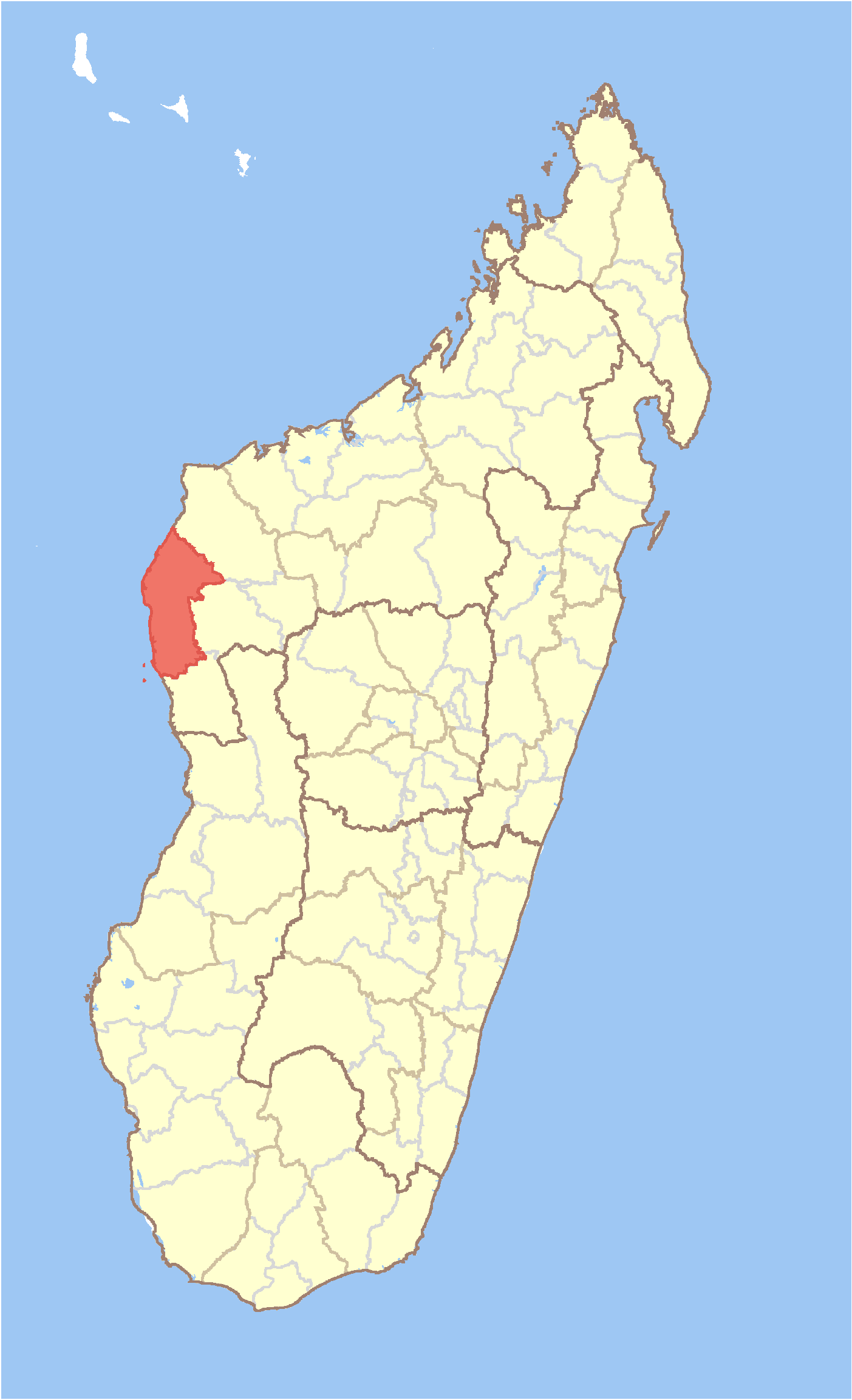
- Location in Madagascar
- Coordinates: 16°9′S 46°37′E
- Country: Madagascar
- Region: Melaky

Area
  - Total: 10,031 km^{2} (3,873 sq mi)

Population (2020 estimate)
  - Total: 122,505
  - Density: 12.213/km^{2} (31.631/sq mi)
  - Ethnicities: Sakalava
- Time zone: UTC3 (EAT)
- Postal code: 413

Maintirano is a district in western Madagascar. It is a part of Melaky Region and borders the districts of Besalampy in north, Morafenobe in east and Antsalova in south. The area is 10,031 km^{2} (3,873 sq mi) and the population was estimated to be 122,505 in 2020.

== Communes ==
The district is further divided into 14 communes:

- Andabotoka
- Andranovao
- Andrea, Melaky
- Ankisatra
- Antsahidoha Bebao
- Antsondrodava
- Bebakony Sud
- Belitsaky
- Berevo-Ranobe
- Betanatanana
- Mafaijijo
- Maintirano
- Marohazo
- Maromavo
- Tambohorano
- Veromanga

== Infrastructures ==
Maintirano is served by Maintirano Airport and a local maritime harbour. The town has a permanent court and hospital.

== Roads ==
- The hardly practicable Nationale Road 1a connects the city with Tsiroanomandidy and inlands.
- The Nationale Road 8a leads southwards to Antsalova.
- The Nationale Road 19 northwards to Mahajunga.

== Nature reserves ==
The karstic tsingys of the Beanka Reserve is situated at Ambinda (Andrea) and Belitsaky.
