= Trangahy =

- Location in Madagascar
- Coordinates: 19°7′S 44°33′E
- Country: Madagascar
- Region: Melaky
- District: Antsalova
- Elevation: 29 m (95 ft)

Population (2001)
  - Total: 8,000
- Time zone: UTC3 (EAT)
- Postcode: 406

Trangahy is a rural municipality in western Madagascar. It belongs to the district of Antsalova, which is a part of Melaky Region. The population of the commune was estimated to be approximately 8,000 in 2001 commune census.

Only primary schooling is available. The majority (60%) of the population of the commune are farmers, while an additional 20% receives their livelihood from raising livestock. The most important crop is rice, while other important products are bananas, sugarcane and cassava. Additionally fishing employs 20% of the population.

== Geography ==
The municipality is situated at 60 km East of Bekopaka, 33 km West of Masoarivo and 60 km South of Antsalova. In the South it is bordered by the Manambolo River that also forms the border to the neighboring region of Menabe.

The National Road No.8 crosses the municipality, though it is practicable only in the dry season.
