= Manambaho River =

Manambaho River Manambao Maty
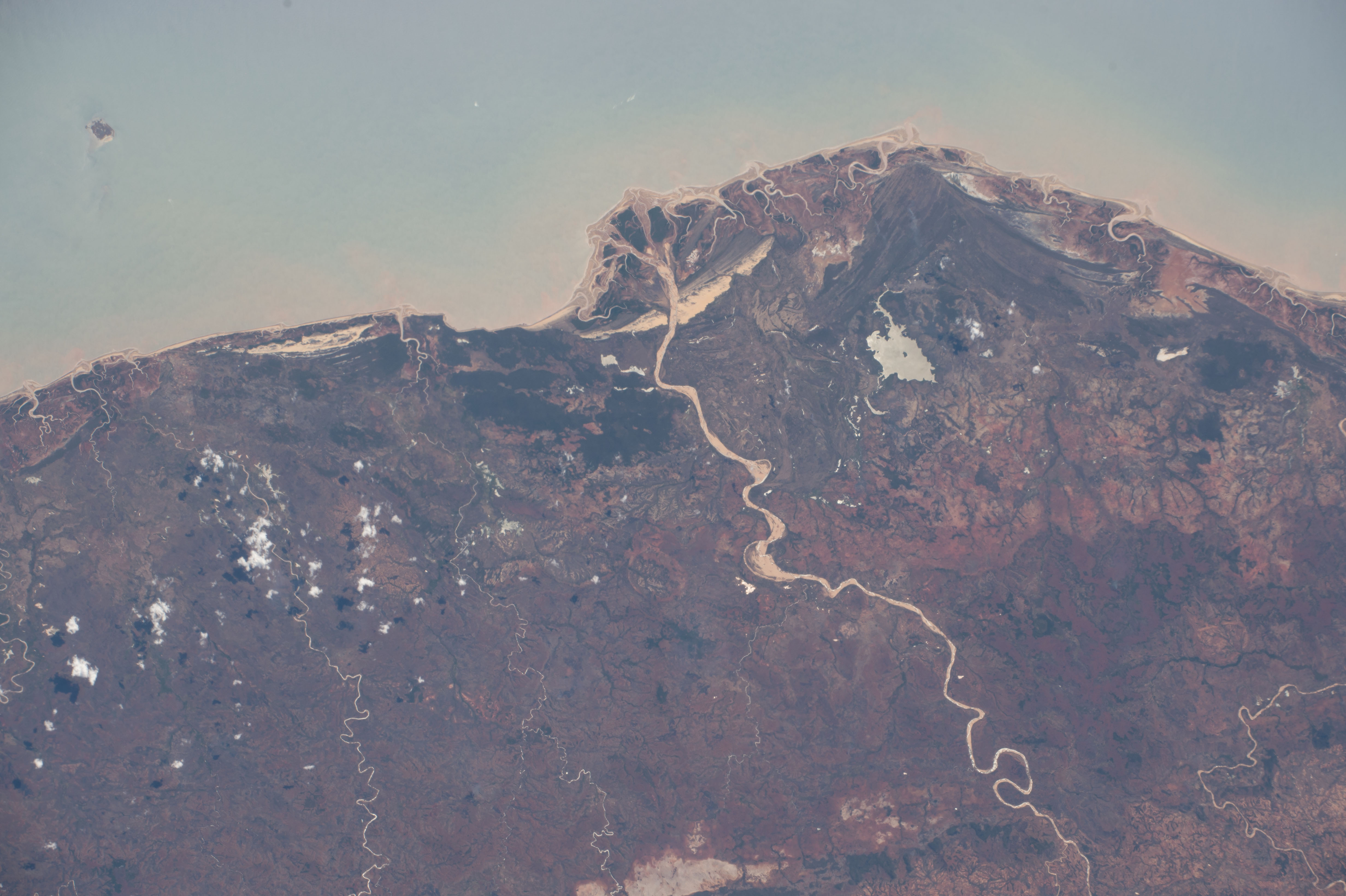

- Map of Malagasy rivers (Manambaho flows from the central part to the Mozambique Channel).
- Native name: Manambaho (Malagasy)

Location
- Country: Madagascar
- Region: Melaky, Bongolava
- City: Morafenobe

Physical characteristics
- Mouth
  - location: Channel of Mozambique
  - coordinates: 17°42′48″S 43°58′58″E

Manambaho is a river in Melaky & Bongolava in western Madagascar.

It flows down from central Madagascar into the Mozambique Channel and the Indian Ocean. Its springs are near Tsiroanomandidy (Bongolava), it passes near Morafenobe and it empties south of Tambohorano and north of Maintirano.
