= Bemarivo =

- Location in Madagascar
- Coordinates: 17°48′22.942″S 44°42′27.611″E
- Country: Madagascar
- Region: Melaky
- District: Ambatomainty
- Elevation: 291 m (955 ft)

Population (2019)Census
  - Total: 9,091
- Time zone: UTC3 (EAT)
- Postal code: 404

Bemarivo is a rural municipality in north-western Madagascar. It belongs to the district of Ambatomainty, which is a part of Melaky Region. It has a population of 9,091 inhabitants.

It can be reached by the unpaved National road 8c from Morafenobe to Ambatomainty.
