= Masoarivo, Antsalova =

Masoarivo
- Location in Madagascar
- Coordinates: 19°2′S 44°20′E
- Country: Madagascar
- Region: Melaky
- District: Antsalova

Area
  - Total: 957.71 km^{2} (369.77 sq mi)
- Elevation: 9 m (30 ft)

Population (2001)
  - Total: 8,000
- Time zone: UTC3 (EAT)
- Postal code: 406

Masoarivo is a rural municipality in western Madagascar. It belongs to the district of Antsalova, which is a part of the region of Melaky. The population of the commune was estimated to be approximately 8,000 in 2001 commune census.

Masoarivo is served by a local airport and riverine harbour. Primary and junior level secondary education are available in town. The majority 54% of the population of the commune are farmers, while an additional 23% receives their livelihood from raising livestock. The most important crop is rice, while other important products are maize, cassava and bananas. Services provide employment for 3% of the population. Additionally fishing employs 20% of the population.

== Geography ==
This municipality borders to Trangahy in the West, to Antsalova in the North, and to the Mozambique Channel in the West. It is located at 120 km from Antsalova.

It has a small harbour.

The National Road No.8 crosses the municipality, though it is practicable only in the dry season.

== Protected areas ==
- Tsimembo-Manambolomaty protected area is partly situated in this municipality.
