= Mafaijijo =

- Location in Madagascar
- Coordinates: 18°3′S 44°15′E
- Country: Madagascar
- Region: Melaky
- District: Maintirano

Government
  - Mayor: Raymond Tsiresy
- Elevation: 60 m (200 ft)

Population (2001)
  - Total: 5,000
- Time zone: UTC3 (EAT)
- Postal code: 413

Mafaijijo is a rural municipality in western Madagascar. It belongs to the district of Maintirano, which is a part of Melaky Region. The population of the commune was estimated to be approximately 5,000 in 2001 commune census.

Only primary schooling is available. Farming and raising livestock provides employment for 40% and 60% of the working population. The most important crop is sugarcane, while other important products are bananas, maize and tomatoes.

== Roads ==
The unpaved National road 8a.
