= Belitsaky =

- Location in Madagascar
- Coordinates: 17°58′28″S 44°25′47″E
- Country: Madagascar
- Region: Melaky
- District: Maintirano
- Time zone: UTC3 (EAT)
- Postal code: 413

Belitsaky is a villge in western Madagascar, Maintirano, Melaky Region. It is connected by Nationale Road 1 with Tsiroanomandidy and Maintirano (72 km).

== Sights ==
The Tsingy de Beanka, a protected area of 57.800 ha.
