= Tsingy =

Tsingy may refer to:

- Tsingy, a type of karst topography
- Tsingy de Bemaraha National Park, Madagascar
- Tsingy de Bemaraha Strict Nature Reserve, Madagascar
- Tsingy de Namoroka National Park, Madagascar
