= Andrea, Melaky =

- Location in Madagascar
- Coordinates: 17°53′S 44°07′E
- Country: Madagascar
- Region: Melaky
- District: Maintirano
- Elevation: 61 m (200 ft)

Population (2018)Census
  - Total: 6,526
- Time zone: UTC3 (EAT)
- Postal code: 413

Andrea, Melaky is a rural municipality in western Madagascar. It belongs to the district of Maintirano, which is a part of Melaky Region. The population of the municipality was 6526 inhabitants in 2019.

The municipality is situated at 25 km North of Maintirano.

== Nature reserves ==
The karstic tsingys of the Beanka Reserve is situated at Ambinda, that belongs to this municipality.
