= Bemokotra Sud =

- Location in Madagascar
- Coordinates: 17°20′S 44°04′E
- Country: Madagascar
- Region: Melaky
- District: Maintirano
- Elevation: 12 m (39 ft)

Population (2018)Census
  - Total: 5,773
- Time zone: UTC3 (EAT)
- Postal code: 413

Bemokotra Sud is a rural municipality in western Madagascar. It belongs to the district of Maintirano, which is a part of Melaky Region. The population of the municipality 5773 in 2019.

Only primary schooling is available. The majority 90% of the population of the municipality are farmers, while an additional 7% receives their livelihood from raising livestock. The most important crop is rice, while other important products are maize, cassava and barley. Additionally fishing employs 3% of the population.
