= Betanatanana =

- Location in Madagascar
- Coordinates: 18°11′S 44°14′E
- Country: Madagascar
- Region: Melaky
- District: Maintirano
- Elevation: 35 m (115 ft)

Population (2001)
  - Total: 7,000
- Time zone: UTC3 (EAT)
- Postal code: 413

Betanatanana is a rural municipality in western Madagascar. It belongs to the district of Maintirano, which is a part of Melaky Region. The population of the commune was estimated to be approximately 7,000 in 2001 commune census.

Primary and junior level secondary education are available in town. The majority 70% of the population of the commune are farmers, while an additional 24% receives their livelihood from raising livestock. The most important crop is rice, while other important products are bananas, sugarcane and coconuts. Services provide employment for 1% of the population. Additionally fishing employs 5% of the population.

== Roads ==
The unpaved National road 8a.
