= Bemaraha Atsinanana =

Bemara Atsinanana
- Location in Madagascar
- Country: Madagascar
- Region: Melaky
- District: Antsalova District

Population (2018)Census
  - Total: 2,610
- Time zone: UTC3 (EAT)
- Postal code: 406

Bemara Atsinanana is a rural municipality in western Madagascar. It belongs to the Antsalova District, which is a part of Melaky Region. The population was 2,610 inhabitants in 2018.
