= WTT =

WTT may refer to:

- Warsaw Trade Tower
- Watch the Throne, a 2011 studio album by Kanye West and Jay-Z
- WaterTower Theatre
- Working timetable
- World Table Tennis (organization)
- World TeamTennis, a defunct mixed-gender professional tennis league
- World's tallest thermometer
- WTT HK, a telecommunication operator in Hong Kong
- wtt reduction, the weak truth-table reduction
- Wattle Glen railway station's station code
- Witton railway station's station code
- WTT, the Wahana Tri Tunggal at the Yogyakarta International Airport
- WTT, Wantoat Airport Wantoat's IATA airport code
- WTT, a water tanker/tender of the Buckinghamshire Fire and Rescue Service
- WTT, a weak-line T Tauri star
- WTT, Web Thermal Tables used in virial expansion calculations
- WTT, World-Transforming Technologies is a Latin America Foundation working with innovation technologies to overcome social and environmental challenges
