= FMMU =

FMMU may refer to:

- Fourth Military Medical University, a public medical university in Xi'an, Shaanxi, China
- Tambohorano Airport, an airport in Tambohorano, Melaky, Madagascar
