= Bekodoka =

- Location in Madagascar
- Coordinates: 16°58′S 45°6′E
- Country: Madagascar
- Region: Melaky
- District: Besalampy
- Elevation: 262 m (860 ft)

Population (2001)
  - Total: 10,000
- Time zone: UTC3 (EAT)

Bekodoka is a town and commune (Malagasy: kaominina) in western Madagascar. It belongs to the district of Besalampy, which is a part of Melaky Region. The population of the commune was estimated to be approximately 10,000 in 2001 commune census.

Only primary schooling is available. The majority 90% of the population of the commune are farmers, while an additional 9% receives their livelihood from raising livestock. The most important crops are rice and raffia palm; also cassava is an important agricultural product. Services provide employment for 1% of the population.
