= Marotsialeha =

- Location in Madagascar
- Coordinates: 17°47′S 45°23′E
- Country: Madagascar
- Region: Melaky
- District: Ambatomainty District

Population (2018)Census
  - Total: 6,559
- Time zone: UTC3 (EAT)
- Postal code: 404

Marotsialeha is a rural municipality in western Madagascar. It belongs to the Ambatomainty District, which is a part of Melaky Region. The population was 6,559 inhabitants in 2018.
