= Andramy =

- Location within Madagascar
- Coordinates: 17°58′S 44°47′E
- Country: Madagascar
- Region: Melaky
- District: Morafenobe

Population (2001)
  - Total: 12,000
- Time zone: UTC3 (EAT)
- Postal code: 418

Andramy is a rural municipality in western Madagascar. It belongs to the district of Morafenobe, which is a part of Melaky Region. The population of the commune was estimated to be approximately 12,000 in 2001 commune census.

Only primary schooling is available. The majority 69% of the population of the commune are farmers, while an additional 39% receives their livelihood from raising livestock. The most important crop is rice, while other important products are sugarcane, maize and cassava. Services provide employment for 1% of the population.
