= Lininy =

Malagasy politician

Lininy is a Malagasy politician. A member of the National Assembly of Madagascar, he was elected as a member of the Tiako I Madagasikara party; he represents the constituency of Antsalova.
