= Andranovao =

- Location in Madagascar
- Coordinates: 17°37′S 44°4′E
- Country: Madagascar
- Region: Melaky
- District: Maintirano
- Elevation: 14 m (46 ft)

Population (2001)
  - Total: 12,000
- Time zone: UTC3 (EAT)

Andranovao is a town and commune (Malagasy: kaominina) in western Madagascar. It belongs to the district of Maintirano, which is a part of Melaky Region. The population of the commune was estimated to be approximately 12,000 in 2001 commune census.

Only primary schooling is available. The majority 50% of the population of the commune are farmers, while an additional 40% receives their livelihood from raising livestock. The most important crops are rice and maize, while other important agricultural products are bananas, wheat and coconuts. Services provide employment for 2% of the population. Additionally, fishing employs 8% of the population.
