= Marovoay Sud =

- Interactive map of Marovoay Sud
- Country: Madagascar
- Region: Melaky
- District: Besalampy

Population (2001)
  - Total: 8,000
- Time zone: UTC3 (EAT)

Marovoay Sud is a town and commune (Malagasy: kaominina) in western Madagascar. It belongs to the district of Besalampy, which is a part of Melaky Region. The population of the commune was estimated to be approximately 8,000 in a 2001 commune census.

Only primary schooling is available. The majority 60% of the population of the commune are farmers, while an additional 38% receives their livelihood from raising livestock. The most important crops are rice and raffia palm; also seeds of catechu are an important agricultural product. Additionally fishing employs 2% of the population.
