= Morafenobe =

- Location in Madagascar
- Coordinates: 17°49′S 44°55′E
- Country: Madagascar
- Region: Melaky
- District: Morafenobe
- Elevation: 210 m (690 ft)
- Time zone: UTC3 (EAT)

Morafenobe is a town and commune (Malagasy: kaominina) in western Madagascar. It belongs to the district of Morafenobe, which is a part of Melaky Region.

Morafenobe is served by a local airport. Primary and junior level secondary education are available in town. The town provides access to hospital services to its citizens.

== Geography ==
This town is located at the Manambaho river between Maintirano and Beravina.
