= Bebakony Sud =

- Location in Madagascar
- Coordinates: 17°6′S 44°22′E
- Country: Madagascar
- Region: Melaky
- District: Maintirano
- Elevation: 49 m (161 ft)

Population (2001)
  - Total: 7,000
- Time zone: UTC3 (EAT)

Bebakony Sud is a town and commune (Malagasy: kaominina) in western Madagascar. It belongs to the district of Maintirano, which is a part of Melaky Region. The population of the commune was estimated to be approximately 7,000 in 2001 commune census.

Bebakony Sud has a maritime harbour. Only primary schooling is available. The majority 65% of the population of the commune are farmers, while an additional 30% receives their livelihood from raising livestock. The most important crop is rice, while other important products are wheat, seeds of catechu, barley and raffia palm. Additionally fishing employs 5% of the population.
