= Veromanga =

- Location in Madagascar
- Coordinates: 17°28′S 44°14′E
- Country: Madagascar
- Region: Melaky
- District: Maintirano
- Elevation: 61 m (200 ft)

Population (2018)Census
  - Total: 4,745
- Time zone: UTC3 (EAT)
- Postal code: 413

Veromanga is a rural municipality in western Madagascar. It belongs to the district of Maintirano, which is a part of Melaky Region. The population of the municipality 4745 in 2019.

Only primary schooling is available. The majority 90% of the population of the commune are farmers, while an additional 7% receives their livelihood from raising livestock. The most important crop is rice, while other important products are maize, cassava and barley. Additionally fishing employs 3% of the population.

Veromanga used to be known throughout Madagascar as having the best tasting oranges in the country until their orange grooves were removed several decades ago. The people of Veromanga now replant orange grooves since 2010.
