= Besalampy District =

- District
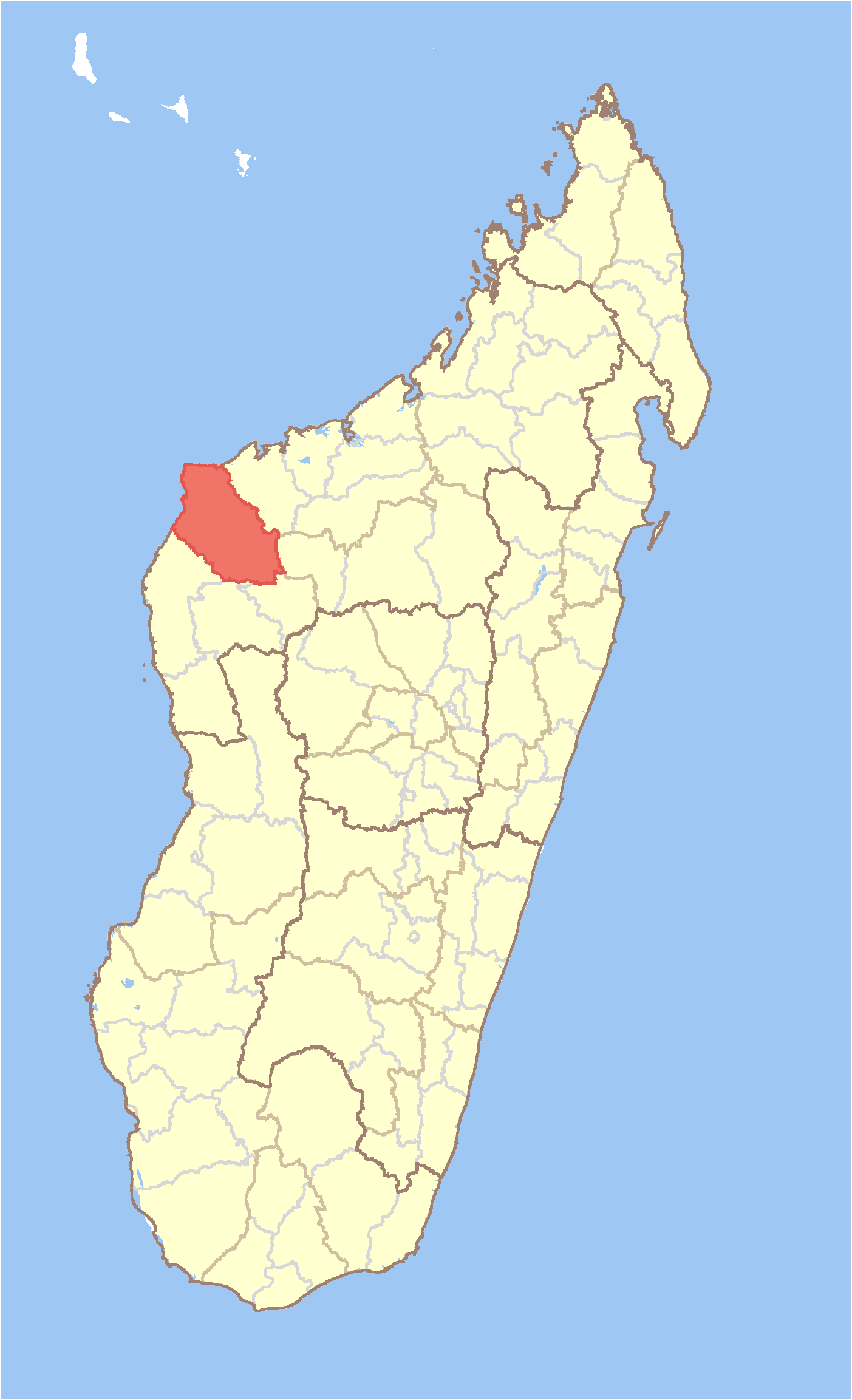
- Location in Madagascar
- Coordinates: 16°9′S 46°37′E
- Country: Madagascar
- Region: Melaky

Area
  - Total: 11,753 km^{2} (4,538 sq mi)

Population (2020)
  - Total: 62,347
  - Density: 5.3048/km^{2} (13.739/sq mi)
  - Ethnicities: Sakalava
- Time zone: UTC3 (EAT)
- Postal code: 410

Besalampy is a district in western Madagascar. It is a part of Melaky Region and borders the districts of Soalala in northeast, Kandreho in east, Ambatomainty in southeast, Morafenobe in south and Maintirano in southwest. The area is 11,753 km^{2} (4,538 sq mi) and the population was estimated to be 62,347 in 2020.

== Communes ==
The district is further divided into nine communes:

- Ambolodia Sud
- Ampako
- Ankasakasa Tsibiray
- Antsirasira
- Bekodoka
- Besalampy
- Mahabe
- Marovoay Sud
- Soanenga

== Rivers ==
- The Maningoza river

== Protected areas ==
- Bemarivo Reserve at 12 km from Besalampy.
- The Maningoza Reserve is located in the district of Besalampy.

== Access ==
By road: from Antananarivo - Tsiroanomandidy -Besalampy by the route nationale n°1
