= Ambolodia Sud =

- Location in Madagascar
- Coordinates: 17°11′S 44°58′E
- Country: Madagascar
- Region: Melaky
- District: Besalampy
- Elevation: 348 m (1,142 ft)

Population (2001)
  - Total: 2,000
- Time zone: UTC3 (EAT)

Ambolodia Sud or Ambolodia Atsimo is a town and commune (Malagasy: kaominina) in western Madagascar. It belongs to the district of Besalampy, which is a part of Melaky Region. The population of the commune was estimated to be approximately 2,000 in 2001 commune census.

The majority of the population is involved in farming or raising livestock. The most important crop is raffia palm, while other important products are cassava and rice.
