= Ankasakasa Tsibiray =

- Location in Madagascar
- Coordinates: 16°18′S 44°51′E
- Country: Madagascar
- Region: Melaky
- District: Besalampy
- Elevation: 20 m (66 ft)

Population
  - Total: 10,870
- Time zone: UTC3 (EAT)
- Postal code: 410

Ankasakasa Tsibiray is a rural municipality in western Madagascar. It belongs to the district of Besalampy, which is a part of Melaky Region. It has a population of 10870.

In 2019 the Cyclone Belna damaged the municipality by 90%
