= Sarodrano =

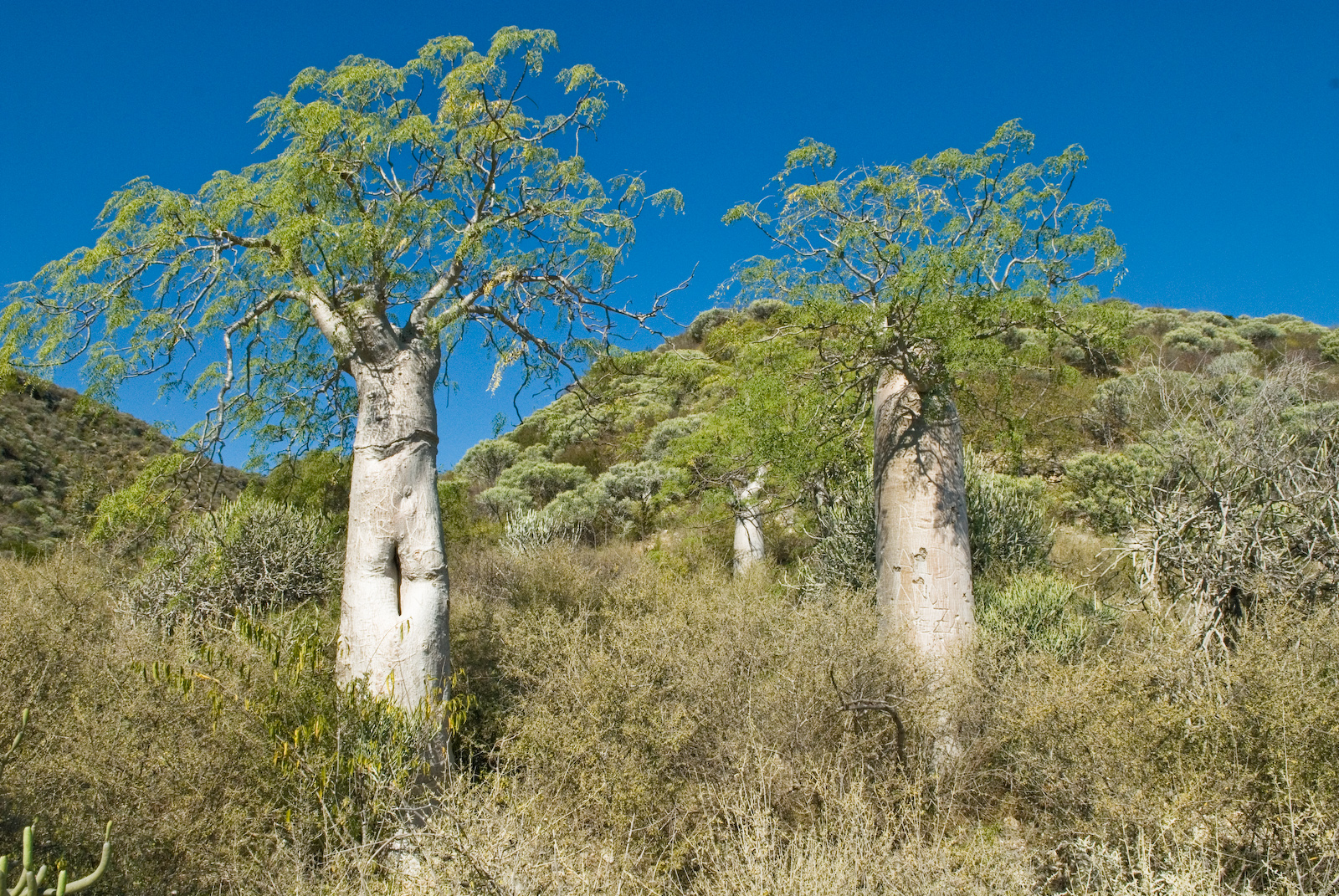
- Baobabs at Sarodrano

- Location in Madagascar
- Coordinates: 18°00′S 44°49′E
- Country: Madagascar
- Region: Melaky
- District: Ambatomainty District
- Elevation: 105 m (344 ft)

Population (2018)
  - Total: 7,057
- Time zone: UTC3 (EAT)
- Postal code: 404

Sarodrano is a rural municipality in western Madagascar. It belongs to the Ambatomainty District, which is a part of Melaky Region. The population of the commune was estimated to be approximately 7,057 in 2018.
