= Marohazo =

- Location in Madagascar
- Coordinates: 17°44′S 44°26′E
- Country: Madagascar
- Region: Melaky
- District: Maintirano
- Elevation: 136 m (446 ft)

Population (2001)
  - Total: 5,000
- Time zone: UTC3 (EAT)

Marohazo is a town and commune (Malagasy: kaominina) in western Madagascar. It belongs to the district of Maintirano, which is a part of Melaky Region. The population of the commune was estimated to be approximately 5,000 in 2001 commune census.

Only primary schooling is available. Farming and raising livestock provides employment for 40% and 60% of the working population. The most important crop is rice, while other important products are coconuts, maize and cassava.
