= Berevo-Ranobe =

Berevo-Ranobe Berevo-sur-Ranobe
- Location in Madagascar
- Coordinates: 17°13′S 44°17′E
- Country: Madagascar
- Region: Melaky
- District: Maintirano
- Elevation: 22 m (72 ft)

Population (2001)
  - Total: 8,000
- Time zone: UTC3 (EAT)

Berevo-Ranobe or Berevo-sur-Ranobe is a town and commune (Malagasy: kaominina) in western Madagascar. It belongs to the district of Maintirano, which is a part of Melaky Region. The population of the commune was estimated to be approximately 8,000 in the 2001 commune census.

Berevo-Ranobe has a maritime harbour. Only primary schooling is available. Farming and raising livestock provides employment for 30% and 65% of the working population. The most important crop is rice, while other important products are coconuts, cassava and seeds of catechu. Additionally fishing employs 5% of the population.
