= Antranokoaky =

- Location in Madagascar
- Coordinates: 18°06′S 44°40′E
- Country: Madagascar
- Region: Melaky
- District: Morafenobe
- Elevation: 429 m (1,407 ft)
- Time zone: UTC3 (EAT)

Antranokoaky is a rural municipality in western Madagascar. It belongs to the district of Morafenobe, which is a part of Melaky Region.
