= Andabotoka =

- Location in Madagascar
- Coordinates: 18°6′S 44°8′E
- Country: Madagascar
- Region: Melaky
- District: Maintirano
- Elevation: 14 m (46 ft)

Population (2001)
  - Total: 5,000
- Time zone: UTC3 (EAT)

Andabotoka is a town and commune (Malagasy: kaominina) in western Madagascar. It belongs to the district of Maintirano, which is a part of Melaky Region. The population of the commune was estimated to be approximately 5,000 in 2001 commune census.

Only primary schooling is available. The majority 85% of the population of the commune are farmers, while an additional 13% receives their livelihood from raising livestock. The most important crop is rice, while other important products are wheat, maize and cassava. Services provide employment for 2% of the population.
