= Ankisatra =

- Location in Madagascar
- Coordinates: 18°14′S 44°9′E
- Country: Madagascar
- Region: Melaky
- District: Maintirano
- Elevation: 15 m (49 ft)

Population (2001)
  - Total: 3,000
- Time zone: UTC3 (EAT)

Ankisatra is a town and commune (Malagasy: kaominina) in western Madagascar. It belongs to the district of Maintirano, which is a part of Melaky Region. The population of the commune was estimated to be approximately 3,000 in 2001 commune census.

Only primary schooling is available. The majority 90% of the population of the commune are farmers, while an additional 2% receives their livelihood from raising livestock. The most important crops are coconuts and rice; also bananas are an important agricultural product. Additionally fishing employs 8% of the population.
