= Soanenga =

Soanega
- Location in Madagascar
- Coordinates: 16°30′S 44°36′E
- Country: Madagascar
- Region: Melaky
- District: Besalampy
- Elevation: 26 m (85 ft)

Population (2001)
  - Total: 9,000
- Time zone: UTC3 (EAT)

Soanenga is a town and commune (Malagasy: kaominina) in western Madagascar. It belongs to the district of Besalampy, which is a part of Melaky Region. The population of the commune was estimated to be approximately 9,000 in 2001 commune census.

Soanenga has a riverine harbour. Only primary schooling is available. Farming and raising livestock provides employment for 48% and 30% of the working population. The most important crop is rice, while other important products are coconuts and seeds of catechu. Services provide employment for 2% of the population. Additionally fishing employs 20% of the population.

== Towns ==
- Amparihy-Bejofo
