= Soahany =

- Location in Madagascar
- Coordinates: 18°24′S 44°08′E
- Country: Madagascar
- Region: Melaky
- District: Antsalova
- Elevation: 21 m (69 ft)

Population (2001)
  - Total: 10,001
- Time zone: UTC3 (EAT)
- Postal code: 406

Soahany is a rural municipality in western Madagascar. It belongs to the district of Antsalova, which is a part of Melaky Region. The population of the commune was estimated to be approximately 10,001 in the 2001 commune census.

Only primary schooling is available. The majority (90%) of the population of the commune are farmers. The most important crop is rice, while other important products are sugarcane, maize and cassava. Fishing employs the remaining 10% of the population.

== Rivers ==
Soahany lies at the mouth of the Soahany river into the Indian Ocean.
