= Ambatomainty Airport =

Airport in Madagascar

- IATA: AMY; ICAO: FMMB

Summary
- Serves: Ambatomainty
- Elevation AMSL: 320 m / 1,050 ft
- Coordinates: 17°41′08″S 45°37′31″E

Map

Runways
Direction	Length		Surface
Direction	m	ft	Surface
04/22	920	3,018

Ambatomainty Airport (IATA: AMY, ICAO: FMMB) is an airport serving the city of Ambatomainty, in the Melaky region of Madagascar.
