= Tambohorano =

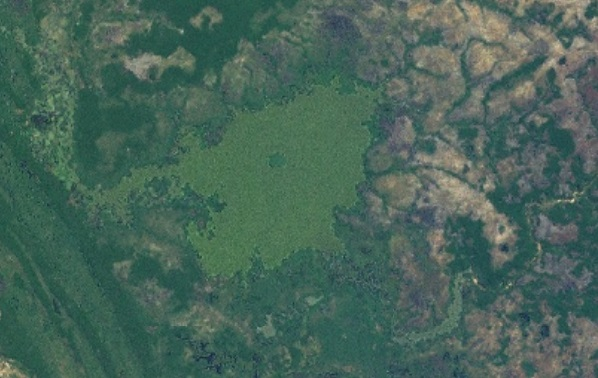
- Mandrozo lake

- Location in Madagascar
- Coordinates: 17°30′24″S 43°57′8″E
- Country: Madagascar
- Region: Melaky
- District: Maintirano
- Elevation: 14 m (46 ft)

Population (2001)
  - Total: 8,000
- Time zone: UTC3 (EAT)
- Postal code: 413

Tambohorano is a rural municipality on the west coast of Madagascar approximately 290 kilometres north-west of the capital Antananarivo. It belongs to the district of Maintirano, which is a part of Melaky Region. The population of the commune was estimated to be approximately 8,000 in 2001.

Tambohorano is on the West coast of Madagascar, 60 km North of Maintirano. It has a local airport and a maritime harbour. Primary and junior level secondary education are available in town. The majority 65% of the population of the commune are farmers, while an additional 20% receives their livelihood from raising livestock. The most important crop is rice, while other important products are wheat, coconuts, cassava and barley. Services provide employment for 5% of the population. Additionally fishing employs 10% of the population.

== Bodies of water ==
- the Mandrozo Lake, the fifth largest lake in Madagascar with a surface of 15,145 ha.
