= Antsalova District =

- District
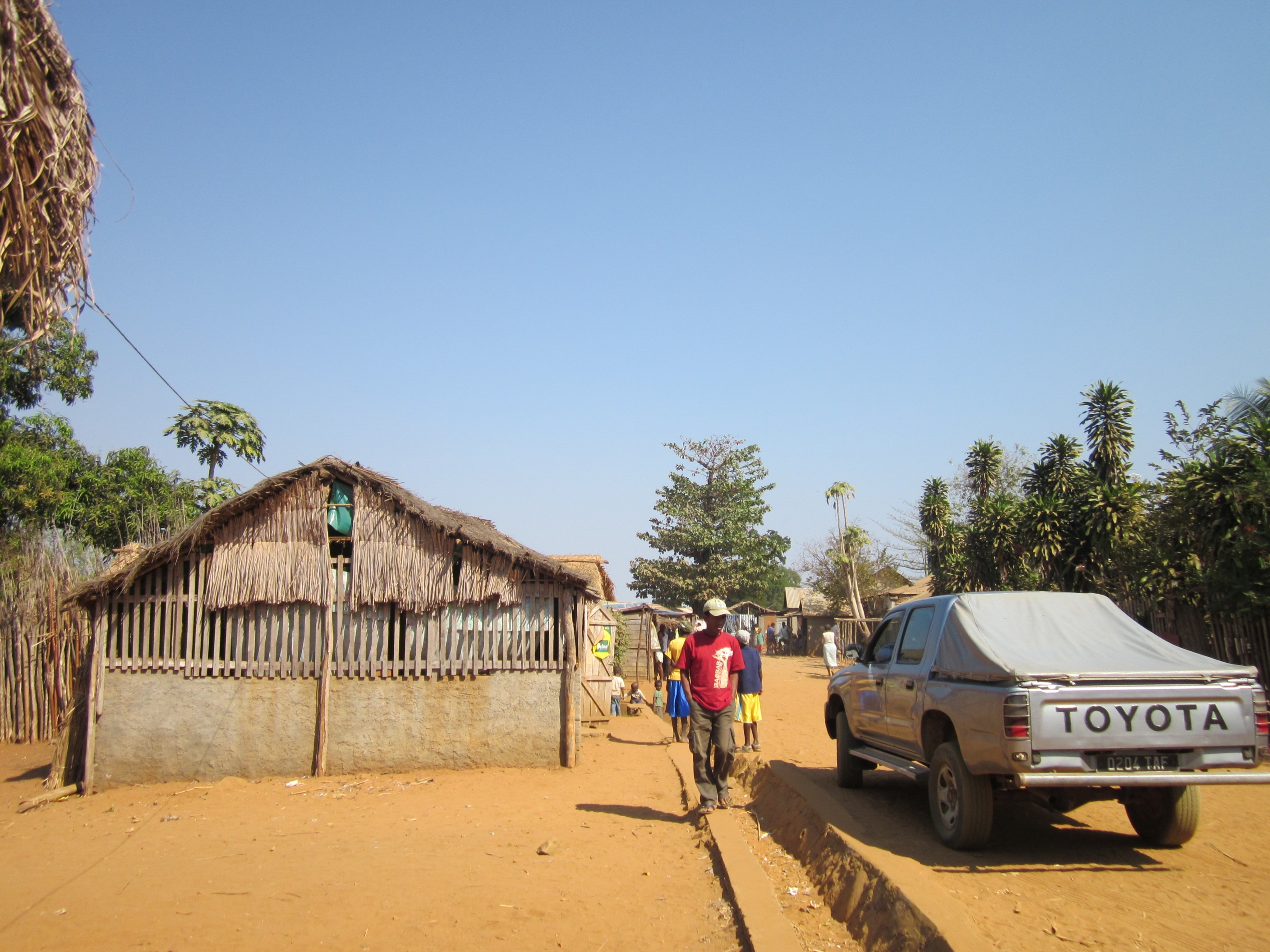
- a shop in Bekopaka

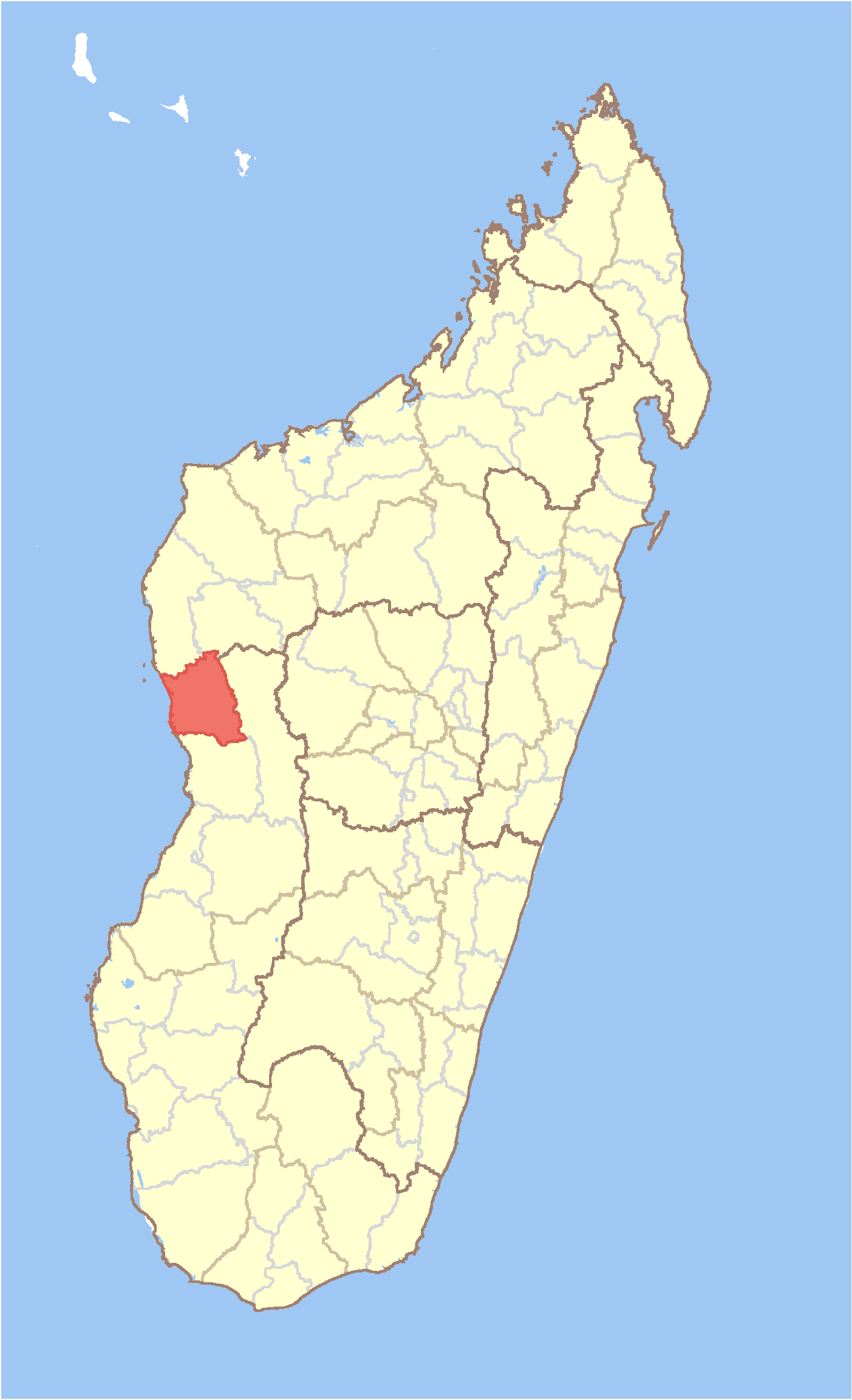
- Location in Madagascar
- Coordinates: 16°9′S 46°37′E
- Country: Madagascar
- Region: Melaky

Area
  - Total: 7,195 km^{2} (2,778 sq mi)

Population (2001)
  - Total: 30,062
  - Density: 4.2/km^{2} (11/sq mi)
  - Ethnicities: Sakalava
- Time zone: UTC3 (EAT)
- Postal code: 406

Antsalova is a district in western Madagascar. It is a part of Melaky Region and borders the districts of Maintirano in north, Morafenobe in northeast, Miandrivazo in east and Belon'i Tsiribihina in south. The area is 7,195 km^{2} (2,778 sq mi) and the population was estimated to be 30,062 in 2001.

The district is crossed by the National Road No.8, though it is practicable only in the dry season.

== Communes ==
The district is further divided into five communes:

- Antsalova
- Bekopaka
- Masoarivo
- Soahany
- Trangahy

== National Parks ==
- The Tsingy de Bemaraha Strict Nature Reserve, near Bekopaka (south end) and Antsalova (Northern end)
- The Maningoza Reserve is located near Antsalova.

== Rivers ==
The Manambolo River.
