= Ambatomainty =

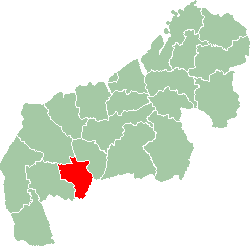
- Map of Mahajanga showing the location of Ambatomainty.

- Location in Madagascar
- Coordinates: 17°41′0″S 45°39′0″E
- Country: Madagascar
- Region: Melaky
- Ambatomainty District: District
- 14,589
- Postal code: 404
- Climate: Aw

Ambatomainty is a rural town in western Madagascar. It is the principal town in the Ambatomainty District, Melaky Region, approximately 220 kilometres north-west of the capital Antananarivo.

It is served by Ambatomainty Airport and the unpaved National road 8c from Morafenobe (108 km).
