= Route nationale 19 (Madagascar) =

Road in Madagascar

Route information
- Length: 523 km (325 mi)

Location
- Country: Madagascar

Highway system
- Roads in Madagascar

Route nationale 19 (RN19) is a secondary, unpaved highway in Madagascar. The route runs from the city of Mahajanga, a city on the north-east coast of the Madagascar to Maintirano. It covers a distance of 523 km and is hardly practicable.

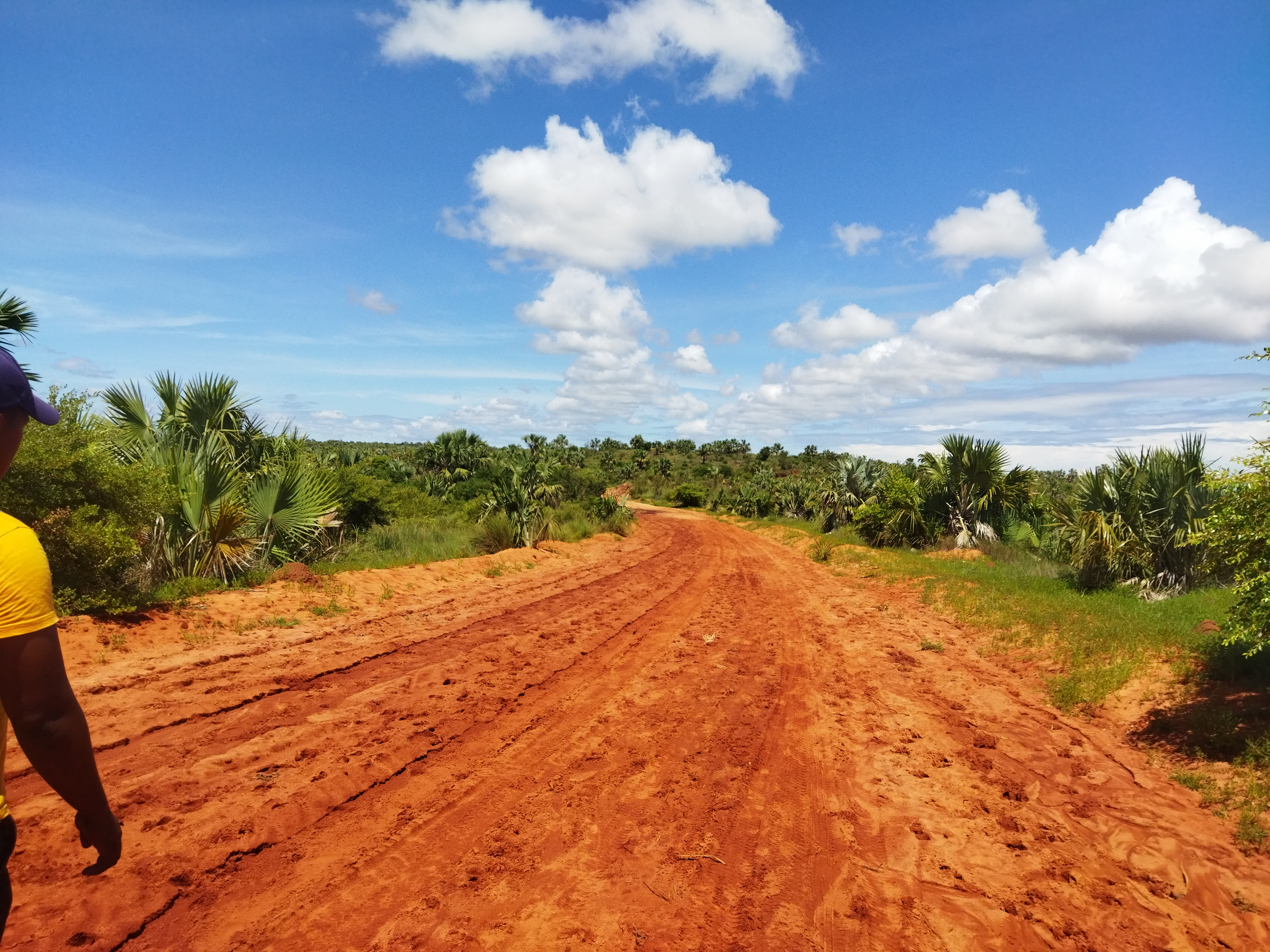
RN19 between Katsepy and Mitsinjo

== Selected locations on route (from north to south) ==
- Mahajanga - (National Road 4)

- ferry over the Bombetoka Bay

- Katsepy
- Mitsinjo
- Soalala
- Besalampy
- Maintirano - (National Road 8a)

== See also ==
- List of roads in Madagascar
- Transport in Madagascar
