= Tsingy de Bemaraha National Park =

National park in Madagascar

Bemaraha National Park
- IUCN category II (national park)
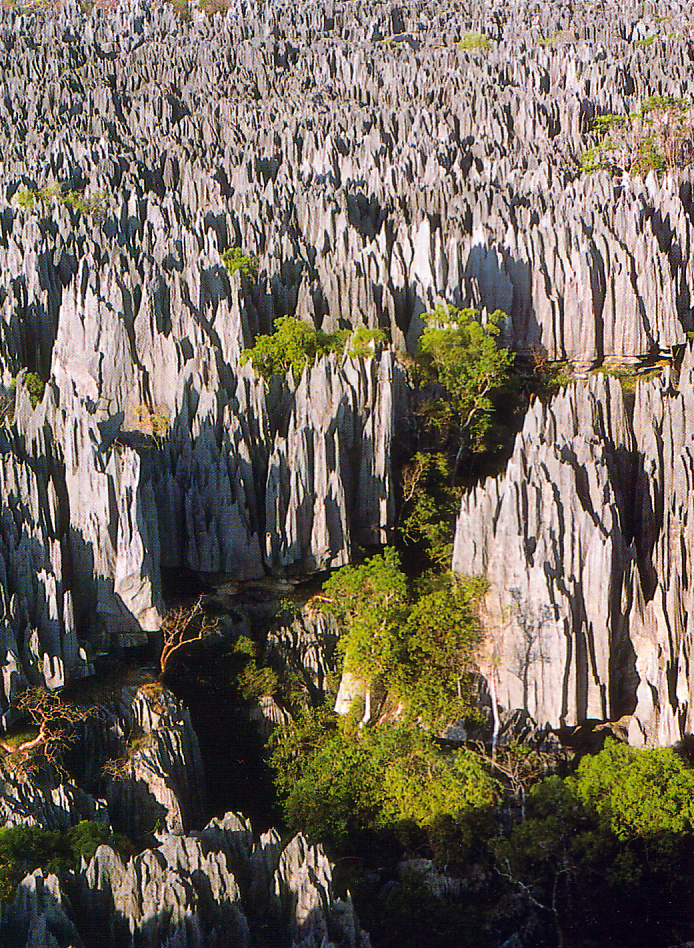

- Location within Madagascar
- Location: Melaky, Madagascar
- Coordinates: 18.6667°S 44.75°E
- Area: 723.4 km^{2} (279.3 sq mi)
- Designation: National park
- Established: 1 August 1997
- Visitors: 10,093 (in 2011)
- Governing body: Madagascar National Parks

The Tsingy de Bemaraha National Park is a national park located in northwest Madagascar. It is mainly within the boundaries of Antsalova District, with a small part in the northeast falling within Morafenobe District. The national park centers on two geological formations: the Great Tsingy and the Little Tsingy. Together with the adjacent Tsingy de Bemaraha Strict Nature Reserve, the National Park is a UNESCO World Heritage Site.

It is crossed by the Manambolo River.

== Geology ==
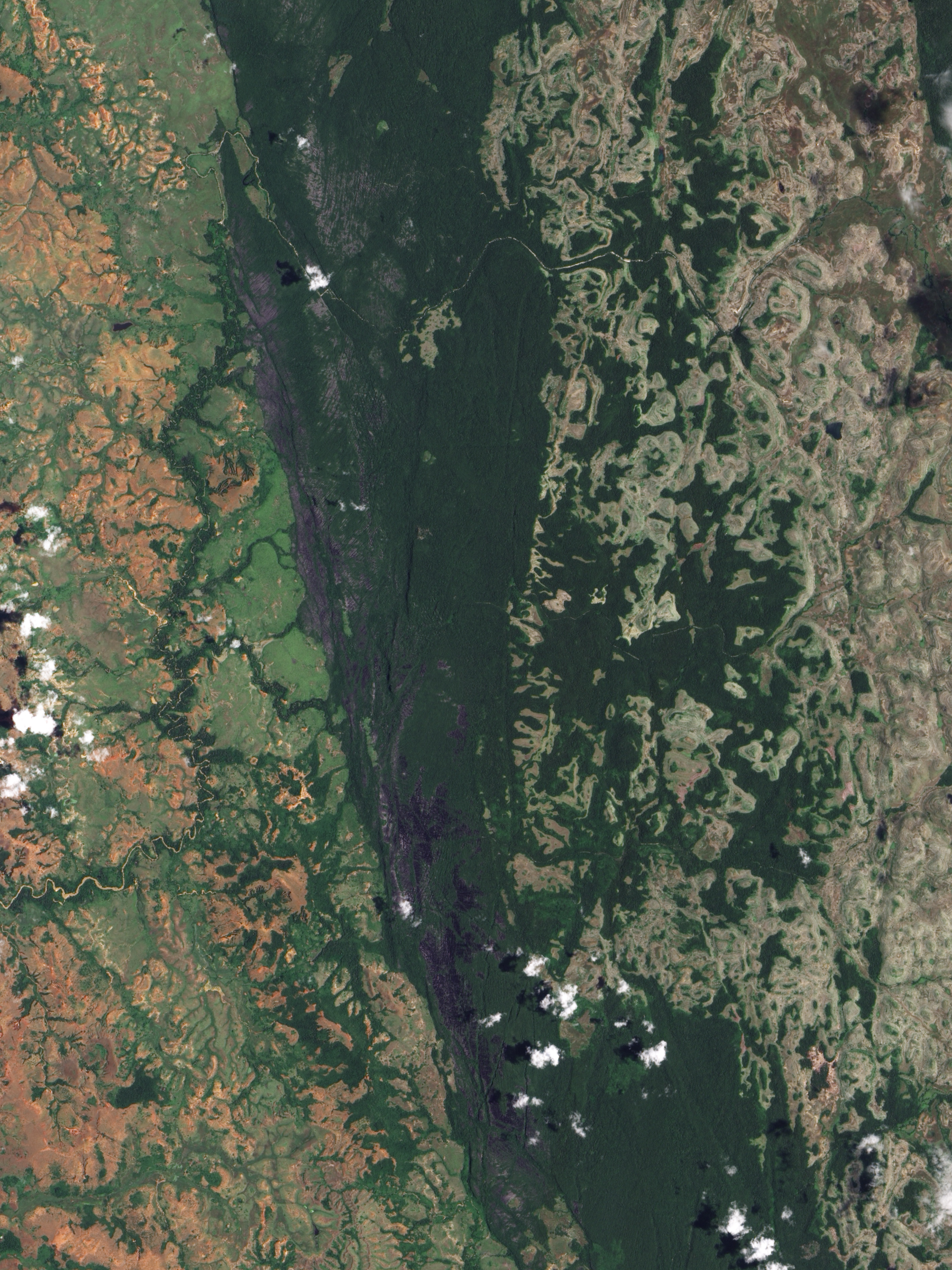
Satellite image of the park

The Tsingys are karstic plateaus in which groundwater has undercut the elevated uplands, and has gouged caverns and fissures into the limestone. In several regions on western Madagascar, centering on the park and adjacent Nature Reserve, the superposition of vertical and horizontal erosion patterns has created dramatic "forests" of limestone needles.

Tsingy is a Malagasy word describing the karst badlands of Madagascar. The word can be translated into English as where one cannot walk barefoot.

== Biology ==
The unusual geomorphology of the Tsingy de Bemaraha World Heritage Site, which encompasses both the National Park and the adjacent Strict Nature Reserve, means that the Site is home to an exceptionally large number of endemic species of plants and animals that are found only within extremely small niches within the tsingys. For example, the summit, slope, and base of a tsingy's limestone needle form different ecosystems with different species clinging to their exceptionally steep slopes.

== See also ==
- List of national parks of Madagascar
- Madagascar dry deciduous forests
- Penitente (snow formation)
- Tsingy de Bemaraha Strict Nature Reserve
- World Heritage Sites in Madagascar
