= Morafenobe District =

- District
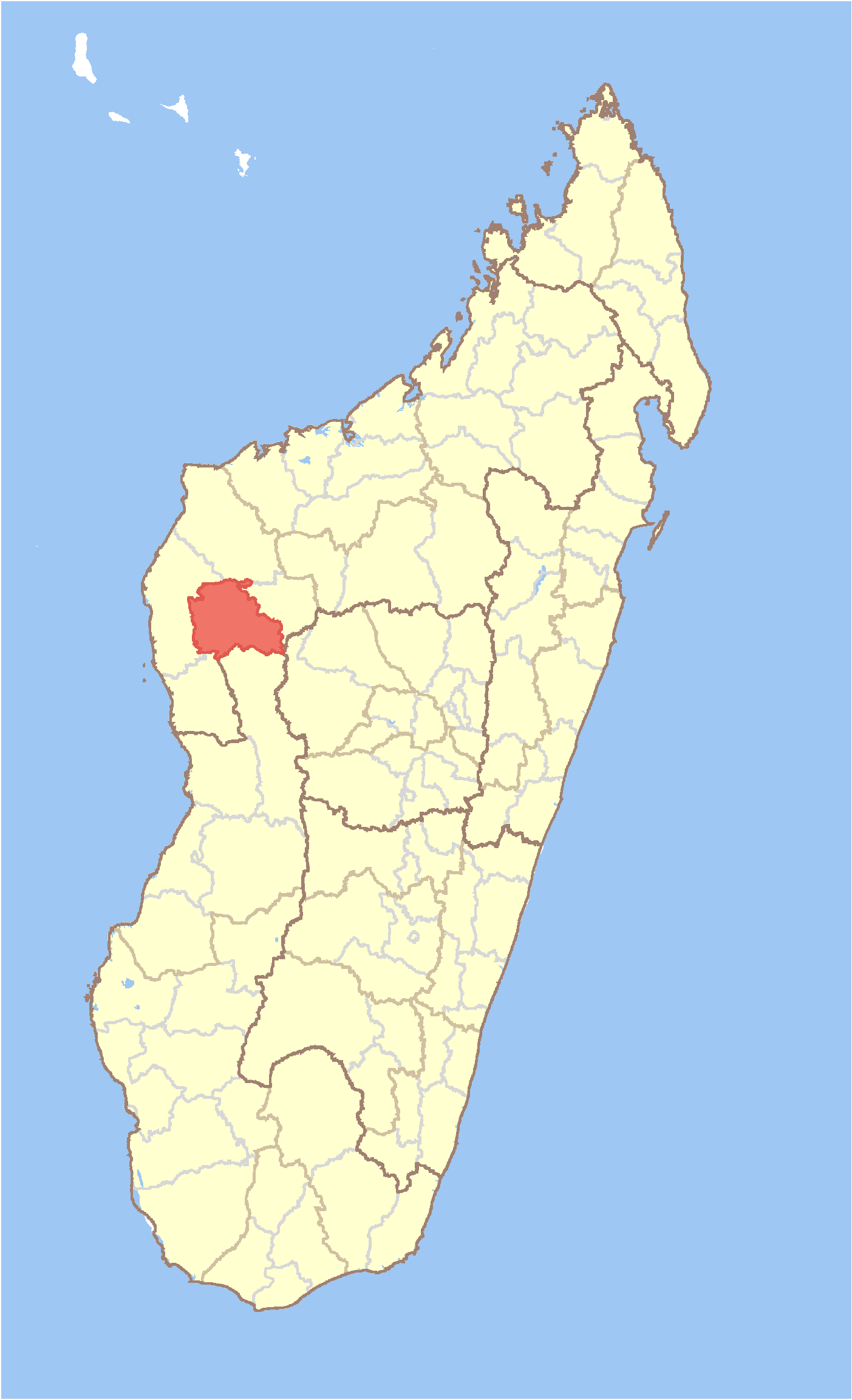
- Location in Madagascar
- Coordinates: 16°9′S 46°37′E
- Country: Madagascar
- Region: Melaky

Government
  - Chief of the district: Solomon Henri Randriamampionona

Area
  - Total: 6,976 km^{2} (2,693 sq mi)

Population (2020)
  - Total: 36,470
  - Density: 5.228/km^{2} (13.54/sq mi)
  - Ethnicities: Sakalava
- Time zone: UTC3 (EAT)
- Postal code: 418

Morafenobe is a district in western Madagascar. It is a part of Melaky Region and borders the districts of Besalampy in north, Ambatomainty in east, Miandrivazo in south, Antsalova in southwest and Maintirano in west. The area is 7,414 km^{2} (2,863 sq mi) and the population was estimated to be 36,470 in 2020.

== Communes ==
The district is further divided into four communes:

- Andramy
- Antranokoaky
- Beravina
- Morafenobe
