= Bekopaka =

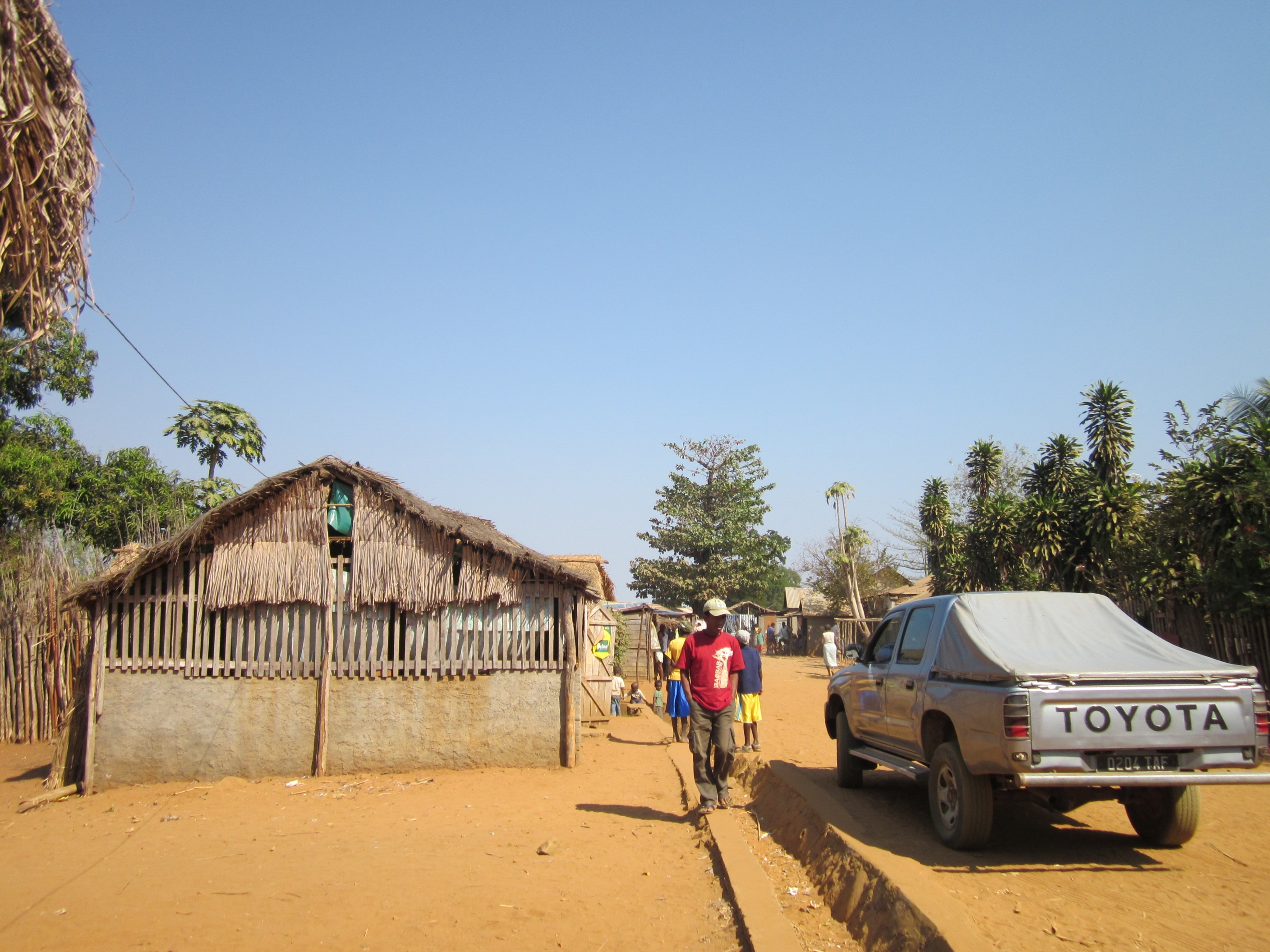
- shop in Bekopaka

- Location in Madagascar
- Coordinates: 19°1′S 44°51′E
- Country: Madagascar
- Region: Melaky
- District: Antsalova
- Elevation: 334 m (1,096 ft)

Population (2001)
  - Total: 9,000
- Time zone: UTC3 (EAT)
- Postal code: 406

Bekopaka is a rural municipality in western Madagascar. It belongs to the district of Antsalova, which is a part of Melaky Region. The population of the commune was estimated to be approximately 9,000 in 2001 commune census.

Bekopaka is served by a local airport, and primary and junior level secondary education are available in town. The most important crop is rice, while other important products are bananas, maize and cassava.

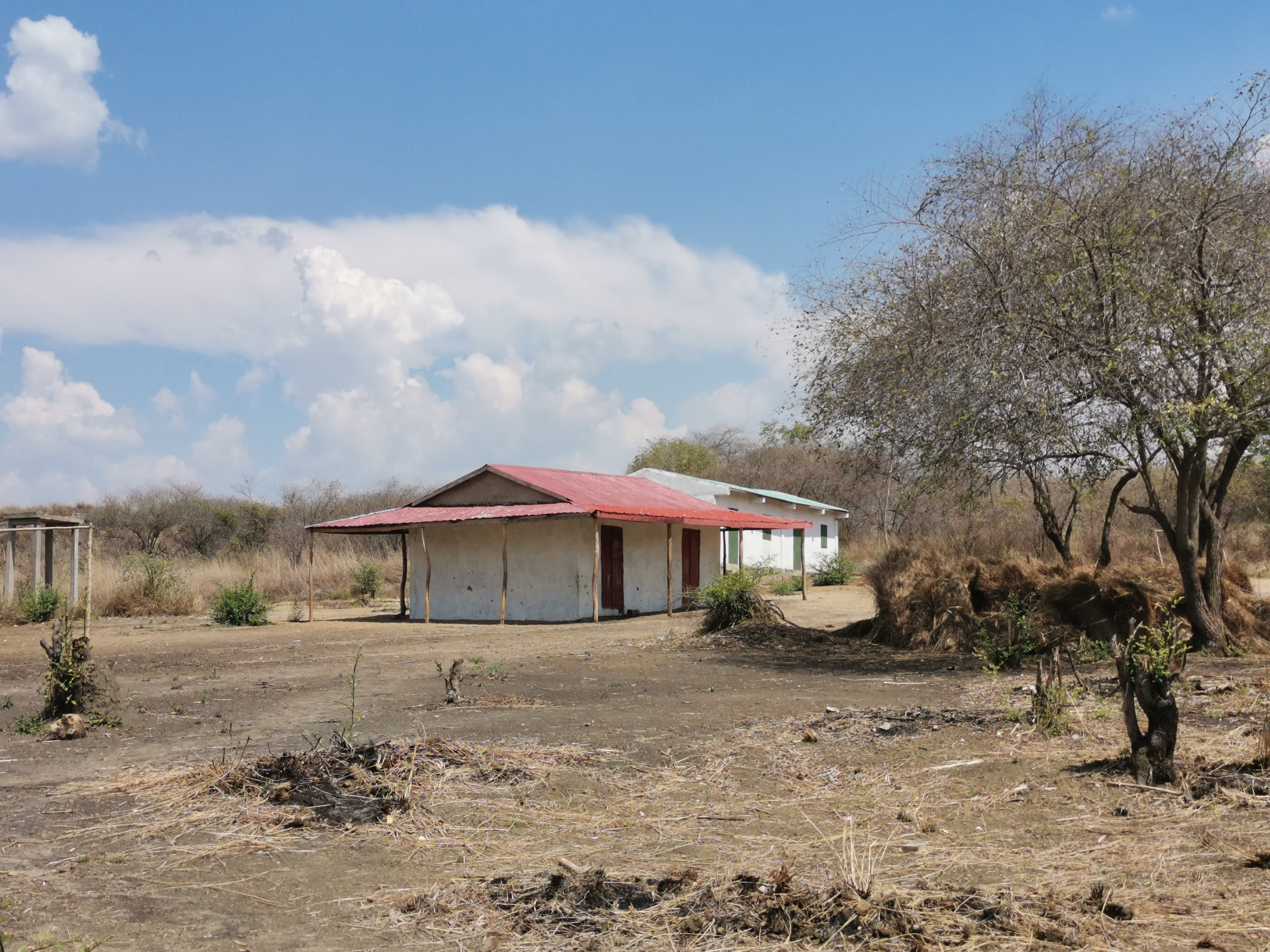
The school of Bekopaka

== Rivers ==
Bekopaka is situated on the Manambolo River.

== Nature ==
The Tsingy de Bemaraha Strict Nature Reserve is situated north from Bekopaka (17 km).

== Roads ==
The unpaved National road 8 from Morondava (195 km)/
