= Beravina =

- Location in Madagascar
- Coordinates: 18°10′S 45°13′E
- Country: Madagascar
- Region: Melaky
- District: Morafenobe
- Elevation: 279 m (915 ft)

Population (2001)
  - Total: 3,000
- Time zone: UTC3 (EAT)

Beravina is a town and commune (Malagasy: kaominina) in western Madagascar. It belongs to the district of Morafenobe, which is a part of Melaky Region. The population of the commune was estimated to be approximately 3,000 in 2001 commune census.

Primary and junior level secondary education are available in the town. The majority (50%) of the population of the commune are farmers, while an additional 50% receive their livelihood from raising livestock. The most important crop is rice, while other important products are bananas, sugarcane and cassava.
