= Morafenobe Airport =

Airport in Madagascar

- IATA: TVA; ICAO: FMMR

Summary
- Airport type: Public
- Operator: ADEMA (Aéroports de Madagascar)
- Serves: Morafenobe
- Location: Melaky, Madagascar
- Elevation AMSL: 748 ft (228 m)
- Coordinates: 17°50′59″S 044°55′14″E

Map
- Location within Madagascar

Morafenobe Airport is an airport in Morafenobe, Melaky Region, Madagascar (IATA: TVA, ICAO: FMMR).
