= Alto Palena Airfield =

Alto Palena Airport
- IATA: WAP; ICAO: SCAP

Summary
- Airport type: Public
- Serves: Palena, Chile
- Elevation AMSL: 897 ft / 273 m
- Coordinates: 43°36′41″S 71°48′20″W

Map
- Location of Alto Palena Airport in Chile

Runways
Direction	Length		Surface
Direction	m	ft	Surface
07/25	878	2,881	Asphalt
- Source: Landings.com Google Maps GCM

Alto Palena Airport (Spanish: Aeródromo Alto Palena, (IATA: WAP, ICAO: SCAP)) is an airport serving Palena, a small town in the mountains of the Los Lagos Region of Chile. Palena is 5 kilometres (3.1 mi) from the Argentina border. The airport is just north of the town, and south of a bend in the Palena River.

There are downslopes past the short overruns of both ends of the runway. There is nearby mountainous terrain in all quadrants, and hills are close to both east and west approach paths.

== See also ==
- Transport in Chile
- List of airports in Chile
