= Wipim Airport =

- IATA: WPM; ICAO: AYXP

Summary
- Coordinates: 8°47′18″S 142°52′55″E
- Interactive map of Wipim Airport

Wipim Airstrip (IATA: WPM, ICAO: AYXP) is an airstrip in Wipim, South Fly in the Western Province of Papua New Guinea. The runway is 1640 ft. long and elevated 100 ft. Its world area code is 804.
