= Maintirano Airport =

Airport in Madagascar

- IATA: MXT; ICAO: FMMO

Summary
- Airport type: Public/Military
- Operator: ADEMA (Aéroports de Madagascar)
- Serves: Maintirano
- Location: Melaky, Madagascar
- Elevation AMSL: 95 ft / 29 m
- Coordinates: 18°02′59″S 44°01′58″E

Map
- Location within Madagascar

Maintirano Airport is an airport in Maintirano, Melaky Region, Madagascar (IATA: MXT, ICAO: FMMO).
