= Winchester Regional Airport =

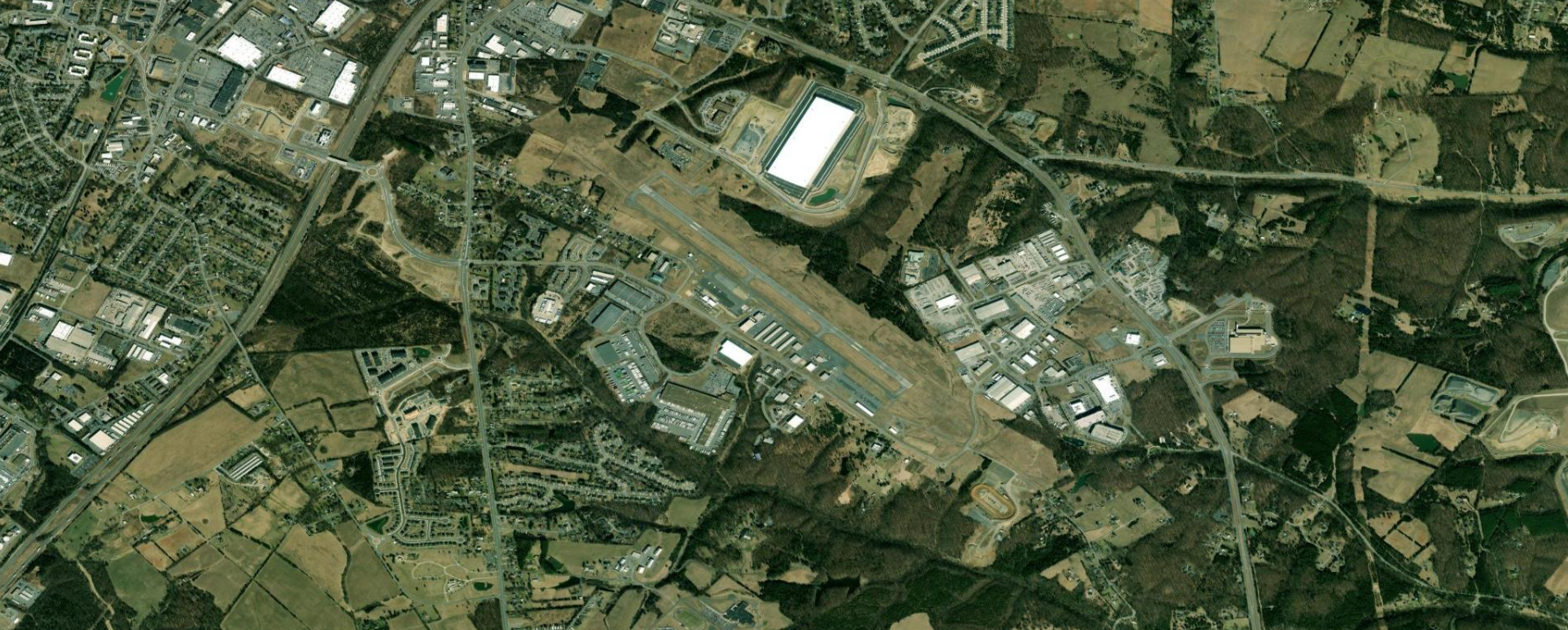
- IATA: WGO; ICAO: KOKV; FAA LID: OKV

Summary
- Airport type: Public
- Owner: Winchester Regional Airport Authority
- Serves: Winchester, Virginia
- Elevation AMSL: 726 ft (221 m)
- Coordinates: 39°08′38″N 078°08′40″W
- Website: flyokv.com

Map
- Location within Northern Virginia Location within Virginia

Runways
| Direction | Length | | Surface |
| Direction | ft | m | Surface |
|---|---|---|---|
| 14/32 | 5,500 | 1,676 | Asphalt |

Statistics (June 30, 2015 - June 30, 2016)
- Aircraft operations: 44,115
- Based aircraft: 99
- Source: Federal Aviation Administration

Winchester Regional Airport (IATA: WGO, ICAO: KOKV, FAA LID: OKV) is three miles southeast of Winchester, in Frederick County, Virginia. It was recognized by the state as a licensed commercial airport in 1937 and was Winchester Municipal Airport until 1987.

Most U.S. airports use the same three-letter location identifier for the FAA and IATA, but this airport is OKV to the FAA and WGO to the IATA (which assigned OKV to Okao Airport in Papua New Guinea).

== Facilities ==
Winchester Regional Airport covers 375 acres (152 ha) at an elevation of 726 feet (221 m). Its one runway, 14/32, is 5,500 by 100 feet (1,676 x 30 m); the runway supports instrument landing approaches, with the localizer on the northwest side of the airport.

For the 12 month period ending June 30, 2016, the airport had 44,115 aircraft operations, averaging 121 per day. Of these, 96% (42,250) were general aviation, and 4% (1,865) were air taxi. 99 aircraft were based at the airport at the time: 82 single-engine, 14 multi-engine, 1 jet, 1 helicopter and 1 ultralight.

flyADVANCED runs a Cirrus Certified Maintenance Center on the field.
