= Wakunai Airport =

- IATA: WKN; ICAO: none

Summary
- Serves: Wakunai, Bougainville Island, Papua New Guinea
- Elevation AMSL: 4 m / 13 ft
- Coordinates: 05°51′41″S 155°13′15″E

Map
- Airport in Papua New Guinea

Runways
Direction	Length		Surface
Direction	m	ft	Surface
07/25	750	2,461
- Sources: GCM, WAD, STV, iata.org

Wakunai Airport (IATA: WKN) is an airfield serving Wakunai and Inus, on the Bougainville Island, in Papua New Guinea.
