= Route nationale 1a (Madagascar) =

Major highway

Location
- Country: Madagascar

Highway system
- Roads in Madagascar

Route nationale 1a (RN 1a) is a secondary highway in Madagascar, running from Maintirano to Tsiroanomandidy. It crosses the region of Bongolava and Melaky.

== Selected locations on route ==
(west to east)

- Maintirano
- Amparihimanga
- Tsiroanomandidy - (intersection with RN 1a to Maintirano and RN 1b )

== See also ==
- List of roads in Madagascar
- Transport in Madagascar
