= Ambatomainty District =

Ambatomainty
- District
- Location within Madagascar
- Coordinates: 17°41′35″S 45°39′50″E
- Country: Madagascar
- Region: Melaky

Area
  - Land: 1,830 sq mi (4,740 km^{2})

Population (2020)
  - Total: 46,739
  - Density: 25.5/sq mi (9.86/km^{2})

Ambatomainty is a district of Melaky in Madagascar. The district has an area of 4,740 km^{2} (1,830 sq mi), and the estimated population in 2020 was 46,739 .

== Communes ==
The district is further divided into five communes:

- Ambatomainty
- Bemarivo
- Marotsialeha
- Sarodrano
- Makaraingo
