= Tambohorano Airport =

Airport in Madagascar

- IATA: WTA; ICAO: FMMU

Summary
- Airport type: Public
- Operator: ADEMA (Aéroports de Madagascar)
- Serves: Tambohorano
- Location: Melaky, Madagascar
- Elevation AMSL: 23 ft / 7 m
- Coordinates: 17°28′34″S 43°58′22″E

Map
- Location within Madagascar

Tambohorano Airport is an airport in Tambohorano, Melaky Region, Madagascar (IATA: WTA, ICAO: FMMU).
