= Route nationale 8a (Madagascar) =

Secondary highway in Melaky, Madagascar

Route information
- Length: 118 km (73 mi)

Major junctions
- to end: Antsalova
- from RN 1a Madagascar

Location
- Country: Madagascar

Highway system
- Roads in Madagascar

Route nationale 8a (RN 8a) is a secondary highway of 118 km in Madagascar, running from Maintirano to Antsalova. It crosses the region of Melaky.

== Selected locations on route ==
(north to south)

- Maintirano - (intersection with RN 1a )
- Antsalova (118 km)

== See also ==
- List of roads in Madagascar
- Transport in Madagascar
