= Route nationale 8 (Madagascar) =

Road in Madagascar

Route information
- Length: 193 km (120 mi)

Major junctions
- From: Morondava

Location
- Country: Madagascar

Highway system
- Roads in Madagascar

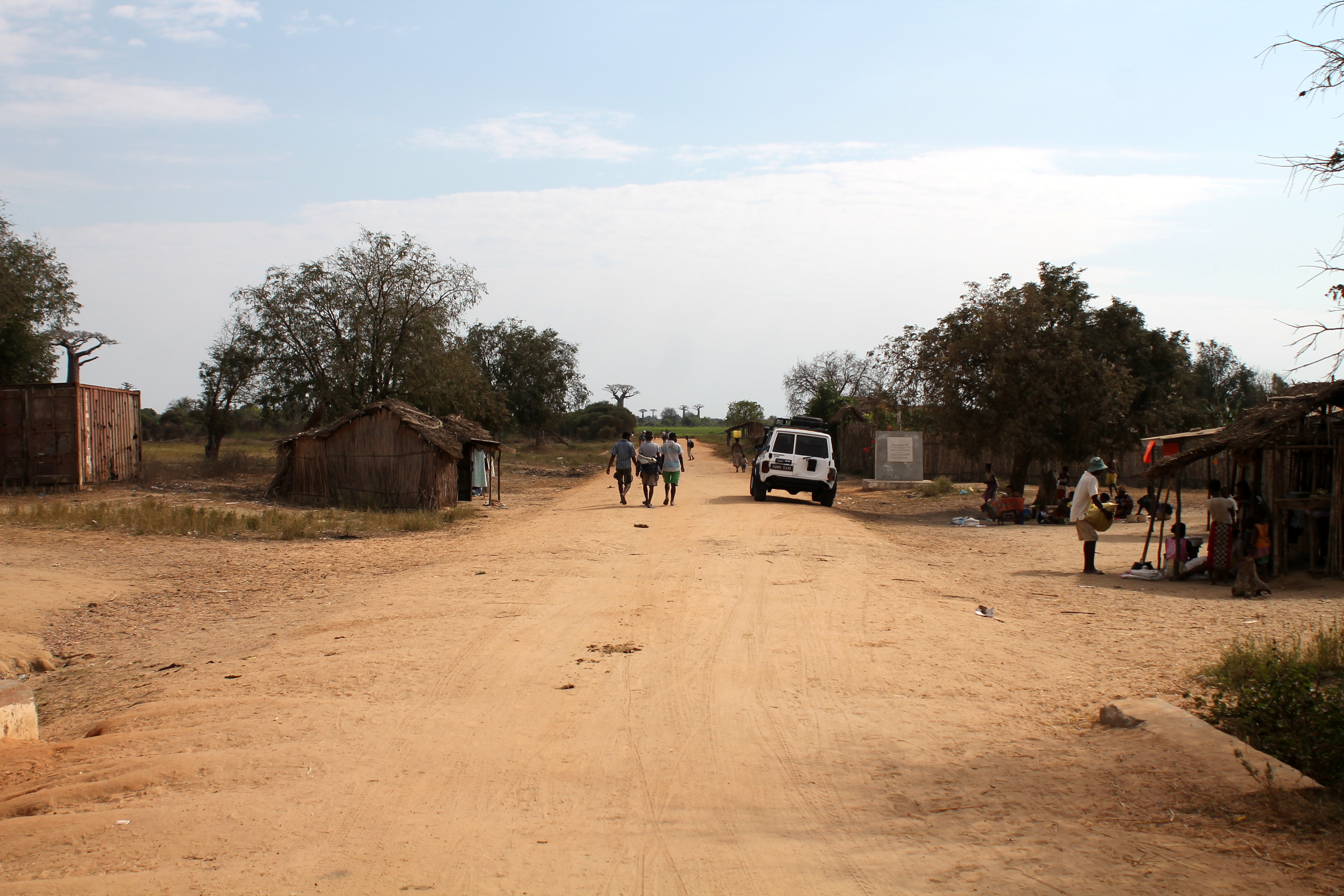
Route Nationale 8

Route nationale 8 (RN 8) is a secondary highway in Madagascar of 198 km, running from Morondava to Bekopaka. Only the first 15km are paved; the remainder is unpaved. It crosses the regions of Menabe and Melaky Region.

== Selected locations on route ==
(south to north)

- Morondava - (intersection with RN 35 to Ambositra)
  - Avenue of the Baobabs - 20 km north from Morondava)
- Belo-sur-Tsiribihina
- Manambolo River ferry
- Bekopaka (195 km)

== See also ==
- List of roads in Madagascar
- Transport in Madagascar
