= Tsingy de Bemaraha Strict Nature Reserve =

Strict nature reserve of Madagascar

- IUCN category Ia (strict nature reserve)
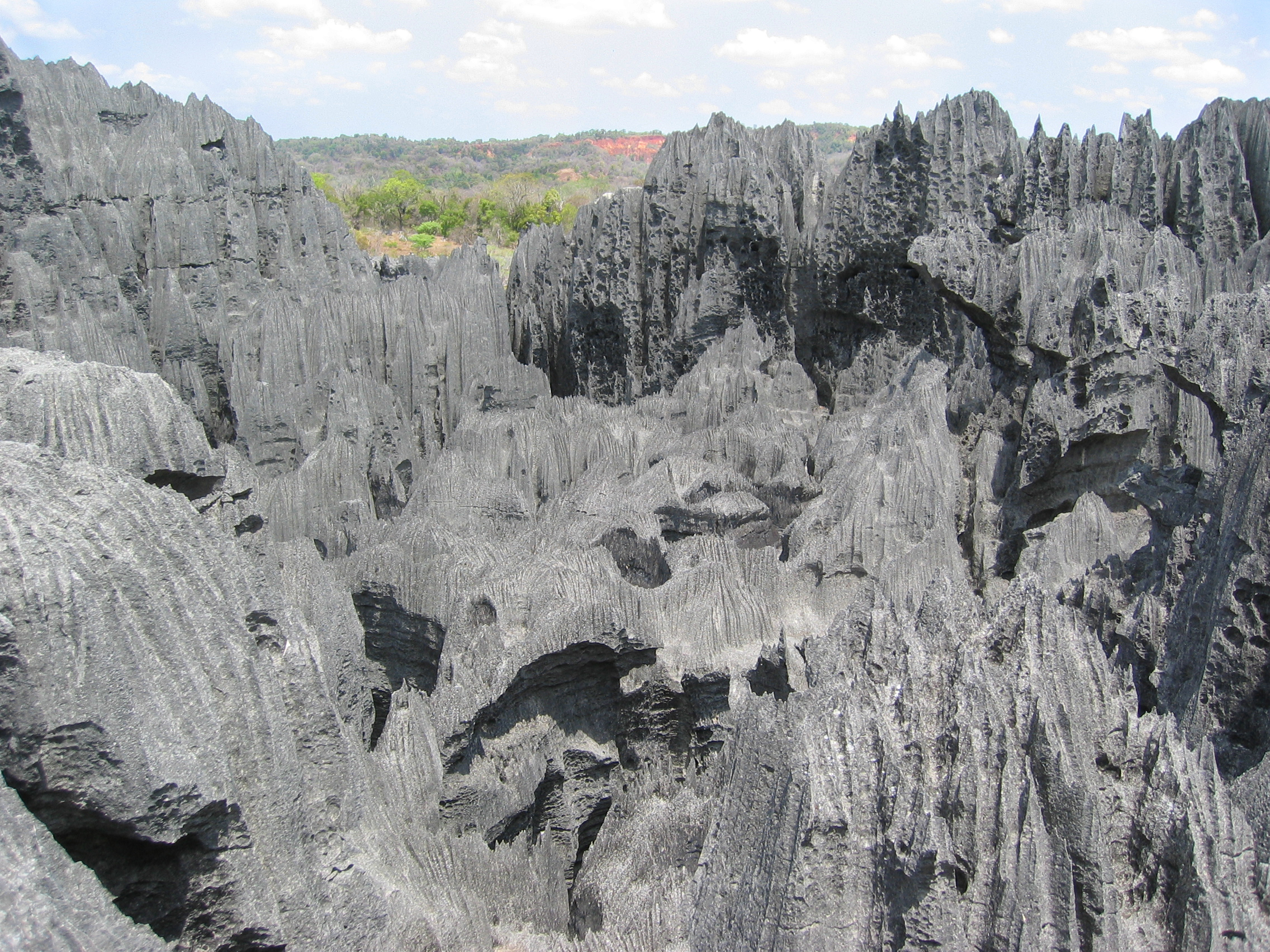
- A karst limestone formation, known as tsingy in Malagasy

- Location within Madagascar
- Location: Melaky Region, Madagascar
- Nearest city: Antsalova
- Coordinates: 18°40′S 44°45′E
- Area: 834.11 km^{2} (322.05 sq mi)
- Established: 31 December 1927
- Governing body: Madagascar National Parks

UNESCO World Heritage Site
- Official name: Tsingy de Bemaraha Strict Nature Reserve
- Type: Natural
- Criteria: vii, x
- Designated: 1990 (14th session)
- Reference no.: 494rev
- Region: Africa

Tsingy de Bemaraha Strict Nature Reserve (Malagasy: Tsingin'i Bemaraha, French: Réserve naturelle intégrale du Tsingy de Bemaraha) is a nature reserve located near the western coast of Madagascar in Melaky Region. The area was listed as a UNESCO World Heritage Site in 1990 due to the unique geography, preserved mangrove forests, and wild bird and lemur populations.

== National Park ==
The southern end of the protected area was changed into the Tsingy de Bemaraha National Park in 1997, while the northern end of the protected area remains as a strict nature reserve (Réserve Naturelle Intégrale). Borders were adjusted in 2011.

It is characterised by needle-shaped limestone formations, above cliffs over the Manambolo River. The incredibly sharp limestone formations can cut through equipment and flesh easily, which makes traversing them extremely difficult. The word "Tsingy" is derived from a local word meaning "the place where one cannot walk barefoot".

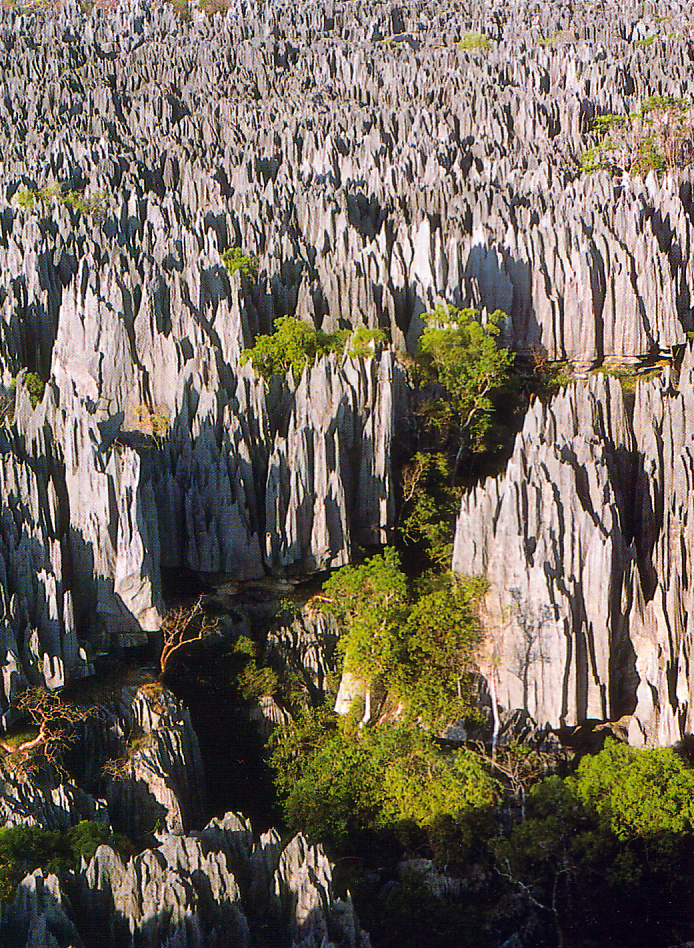
A view of the park

== Tourism ==
Tourists can access the national park by road from Morondava, a town 150 km south of the park. Limited access is also possible from the town of Antsalova, which can be reached by plane from Antananarivo or Mahajanga.

== See also ==
- List of national parks of Madagascar
- Madagascar dry deciduous forests
- Penitente (snow formation)
- Tsingy de Bemaraha National Park
- World Heritage Sites in Madagascar
- Manambolo River
