= Antsalova Airport =

Airport in Madagascar

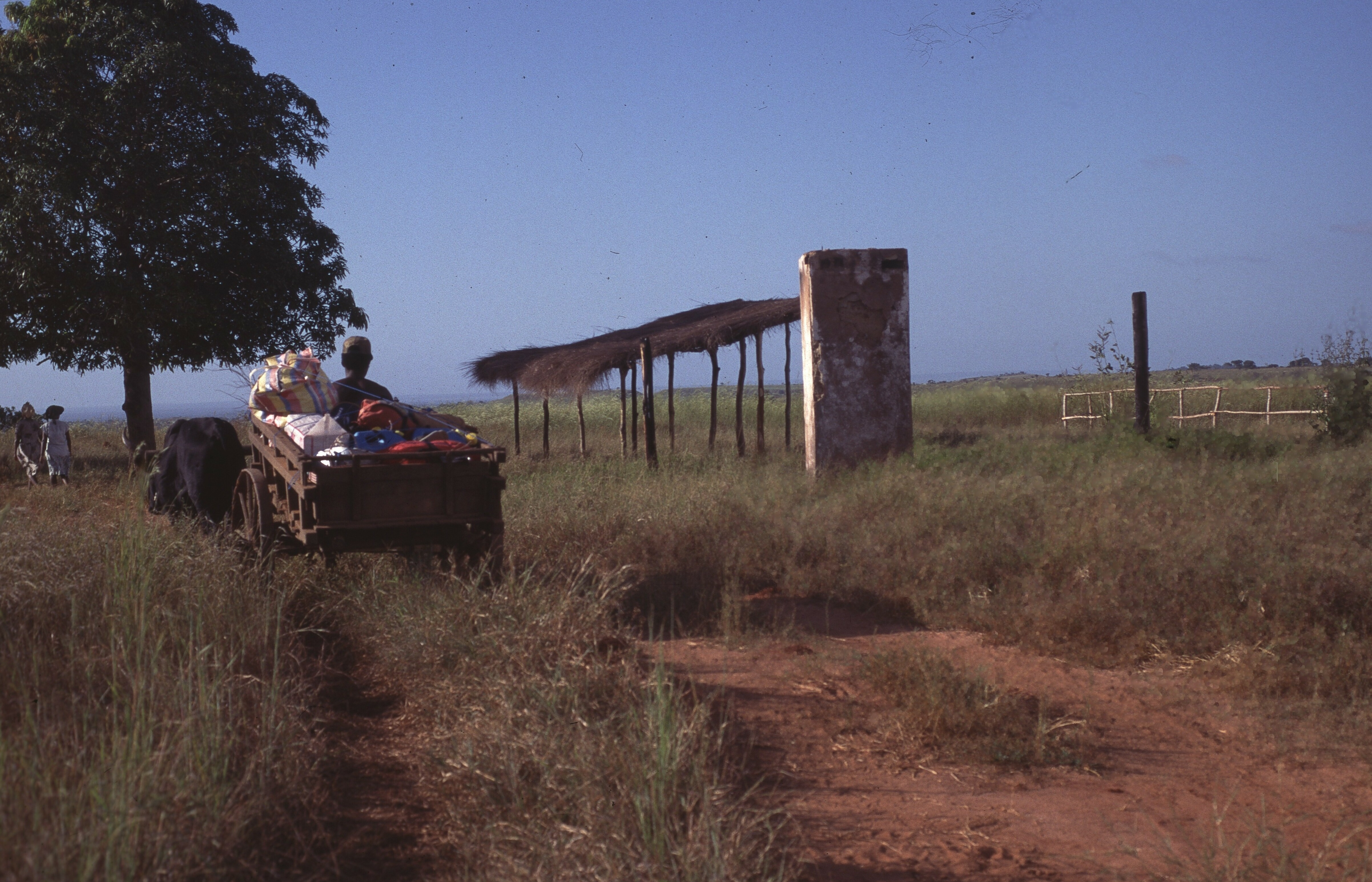
- IATA: WAQ; ICAO: FMMG

Summary
- Airport type: Public
- Operator: ADEMA (Aéroports de Madagascar)
- Serves: Antsalova
- Location: Mahajanga District, Madagascar
- Elevation AMSL: 551 ft / 168 m
- Coordinates: 18°42′04″S 44°36′53″E

Map
- Location within Madagascar

Antsalova Airport (IATA: WAQ, ICAO: FMMG) is an airport in Antsalova, Madagascar.
