= Antsalova =

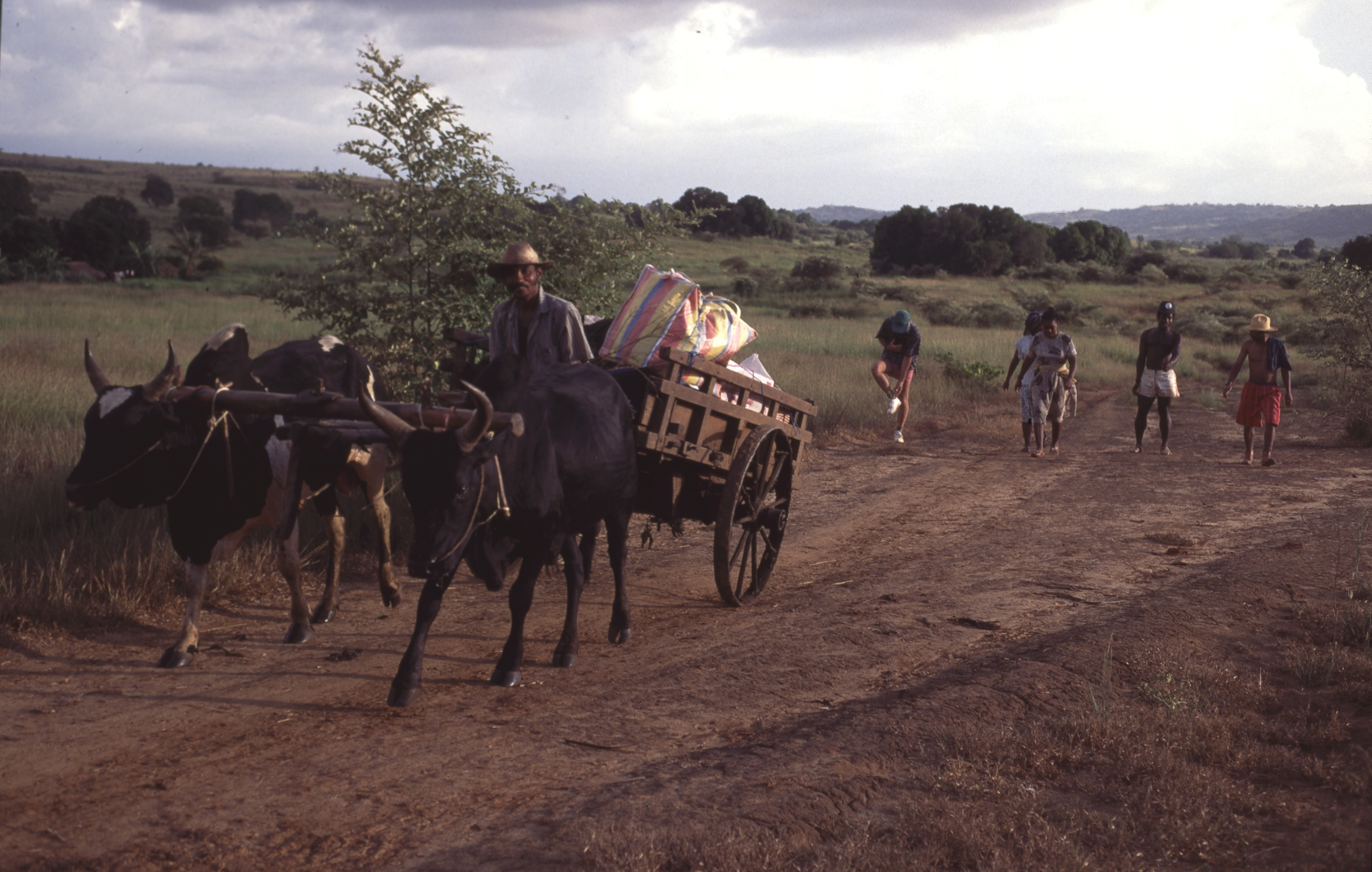
- Antsalova, the road to Bemamba

- Location in Madagascar
- Coordinates: 18°40′S 44°37′E
- Country: Madagascar
- Region: Melaky
- District: Antsalova
- Elevation: 105 m (344 ft)

Population (2018)
  - Total: 58 280
- Time zone: UTC3 (EAT)
- Postal code: 406

Antsalova is a town and commune (Malagasy: kaominina) in western Madagascar. It belongs to the district of Antsalova, which is a part of Melaky Region. The population of the commune was estimated to be approximately 58,280 in 2018.

Antsalova is served by a local Antsalova Airport. Primary and junior level secondary education are available in town. The town provides access to hospital services to its citizens.

Farming and raising livestock provides employment for 20% and 76% of the working population. The most important crop is rice, while other important products are maize and cassava. Services provide employment for 1% of the population. Additionally fishing employs 3% of the population.

Antsalova consists of six subdivisions: Antsalova (pop. 14,095), Soahany (pop. 5,094), Bemara Atsinanana (2,610), Masoarivo (10,122), Trangahy (pop. 13,136), and Bekopaka (pop. 13,223).

== Roads ==
- The Nationale Road 8a leads northwards to Maintirano.

== River ==
Antsalova lies at the Soahany river.

== See also ==
- The Tsingy de Bemaraha Strict Nature Reserve
- The Maningoza Reserve is located near Antsalova.
