= Maintirano =

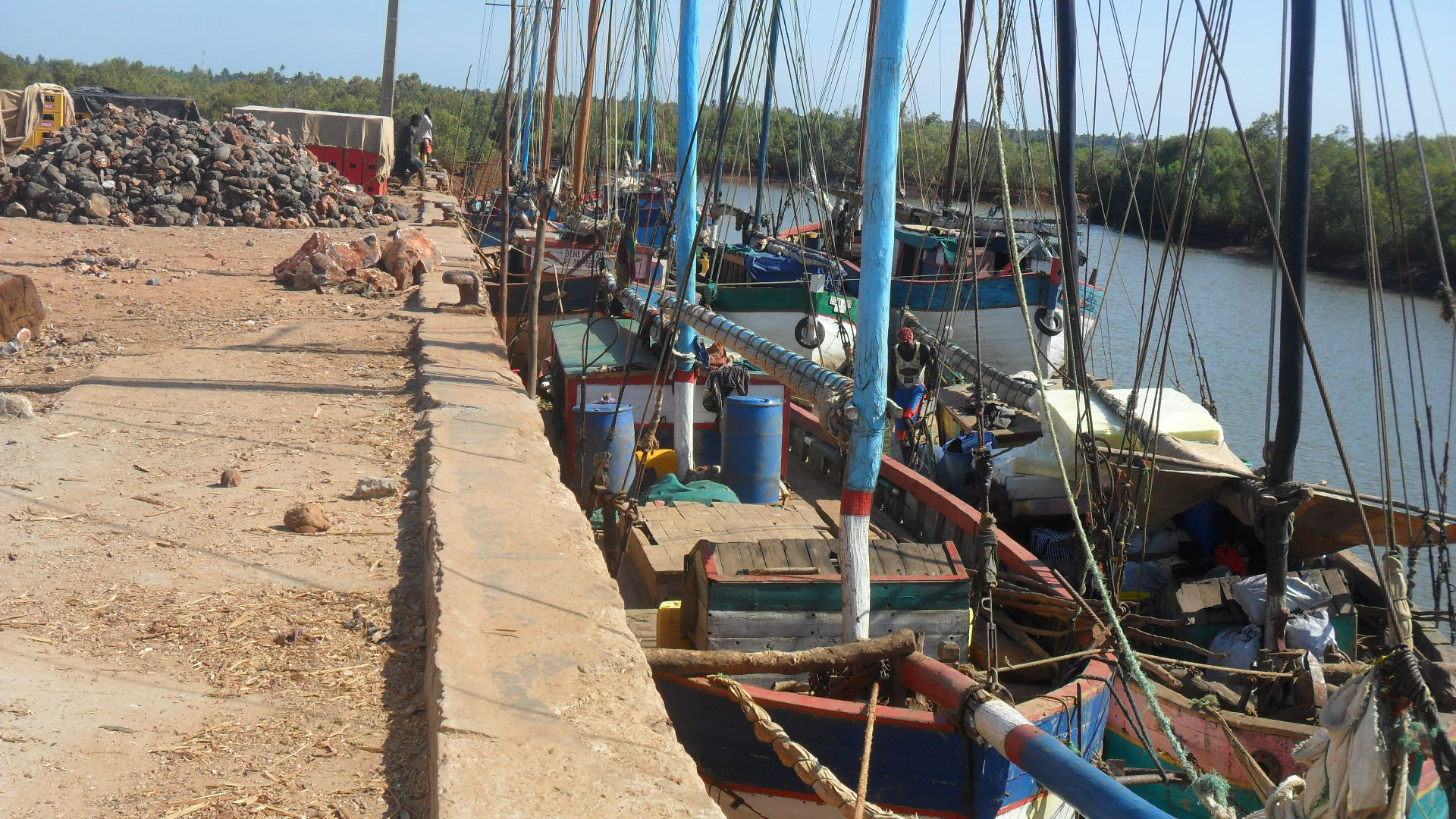
- Port of Maintirano

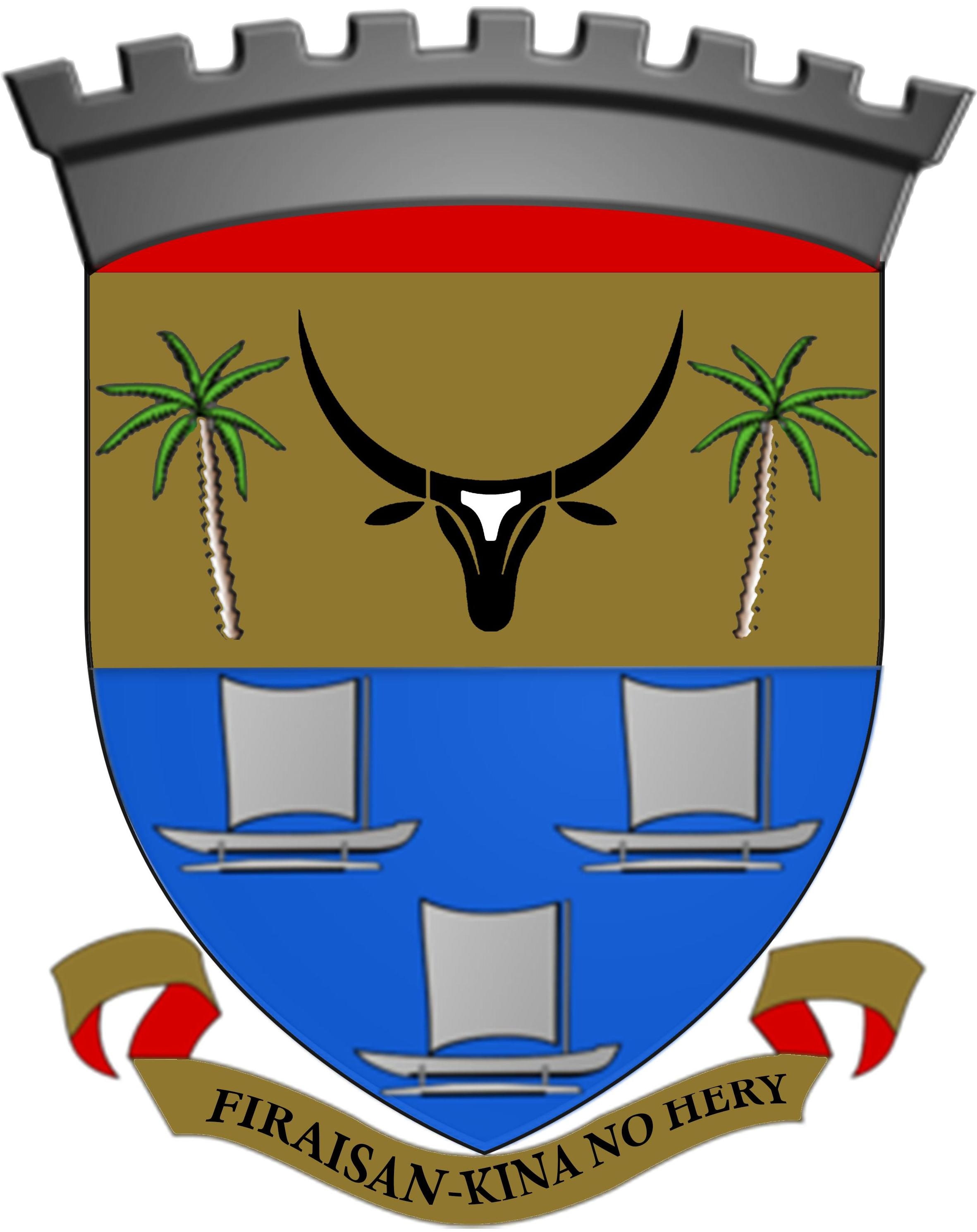
- Coat of arms

- Location in Madagascar
- Coordinates: 18°4′S 44°1′E
- Country: Madagascar
- Region: Melaky
- District: Maintirano

Government
  - Mayor: Tsilavo Todisoa

Area
  - Total: 146 km^{2} (56 sq mi)
- Elevation: 12 m (39 ft)

Population (2018)
  - Total: 25,788
- Time zone: UTC3 (EAT)
- Postal code: 413
- Climate: Aw

Maintirano is a coastal city, urban municipality, and Catholic bishopric in western Madagascar approximately 325 kilometres west of the capital Antananarivo. It belongs to the district of Maintirano, which is a part of Melaky Region – and is capital of both.

The population of the commune was estimated to be approximately 25,788 in 2018. The city is inhabited mainly by the Sakalava tribe.

== Economy and infrastructure ==
The climate is fairly hot and access to the region is difficult due to lack of roads and few commercial flights. Maintirano is served by Maintirano Airport and a local maritime harbour.

The town has a permanent court and hospital.

As of 2002, the majority, 55% of the population, works in fishing. 34% are farmers. Main local products include shrimp and beef. The most important crop is bananas, while other important products are maize, sweet potatoes and rice. Industry and services provide employment for 0.8% and 10.2% of the population, respectively.

== Roads ==
- The hardly practicable Nationale Road 1a connects the city with Tsiroanomandidy and inlands.
- The Nationale Road 8a leads southwards to Antsalova.
- The Nationale Road 19 northwards to Mahajunga.

== Protected areas ==
55 kilometres east of Maintirano is situated the Beanka Reserve, a limestone karst plateau that is the natural extension of the Tsingy de Bemaraha National Park.

== Religion ==
- FJKM - Fiangonan'i Jesoa Kristy eto Madagasikara (Church of Jesus Christ in Madagascar)
- Roman Catholic Diocese of Maintirano.

== Climate ==
Climate data for Maintirano (1991-2020)
Month	Jan	Feb	Mar	Apr	May	Jun	Jul	Aug	Sep	Oct	Nov	Dec	Year
Record high °C (°F)	35.4 (95.7)	33.6 (92.5)	35.8 (96.4)	34.6 (94.3)	33.2 (91.8)	33.0 (91.4)	33.0 (91.4)	33.2 (91.8)	34.1 (93.4)	35.2 (95.4)	35.4 (95.7)	35.2 (95.4)	35.8 (96.4)
Mean daily maximum °C (°F)	29.9 (85.8)	30.0 (86.0)	30.5 (86.9)	30.1 (86.2)	28.9 (84.0)	27.7 (81.9)	27.1 (80.8)	27.7 (81.9)	28.9 (84.0)	29.8 (85.6)	30.6 (87.1)	30.5 (86.9)	29.3 (84.7)
Daily mean °C (°F)	27.3 (81.1)	27.4 (81.3)	27.7 (81.9)	27.2 (81.0)	25.7 (78.3)	24.2 (75.6)	23.5 (74.3)	24.1 (75.4)	25.3 (77.5)	26.4 (79.5)	27.4 (81.3)	27.6 (81.7)	26.1 (79.0)
Mean daily minimum °C (°F)	24.6 (76.3)	24.7 (76.5)	24.9 (76.8)	24.2 (75.6)	22.5 (72.5)	20.6 (69.1)	19.8 (67.6)	20.4 (68.7)	21.6 (70.9)	23.0 (73.4)	24.2 (75.6)	24.7 (76.5)	22.9 (73.2)
Record low °C (°F)	18.7 (65.7)	20.2 (68.4)	19.7 (67.5)	17.0 (62.6)	15.6 (60.1)	13.4 (56.1)	13.3 (55.9)	14.2 (57.6)	14.0 (57.2)	15.2 (59.4)	17.6 (63.7)	20.0 (68.0)	13.3 (55.9)
Average precipitation mm (inches)	397.6 (15.65)	315.9 (12.44)	152.6 (6.01)	63.5 (2.50)	11.5 (0.45)	6.4 (0.25)	1.7 (0.07)	9.9 (0.39)	7.5 (0.30)	17.7 (0.70)	41.4 (1.63)	156.9 (6.18)	1,182.6 (46.56)
Average precipitation days (≥ 1.0 mm)	16.2	13.2	8.6	3.1	0.8	0.7	0.4	1.0	1.1	2.0	3.8	9.7	60.6
Mean monthly sunshine hours	238.7	214.4	267.3	291.6	304.2	293.7	299.9	312.3	300.9	321.8	311.6	273.8	3,430.2
Source: NOAA (sun, 1961-1990)
