= Melaky =

Coordinates: 18.07°S 44.017°E

Melaky Region
- Region
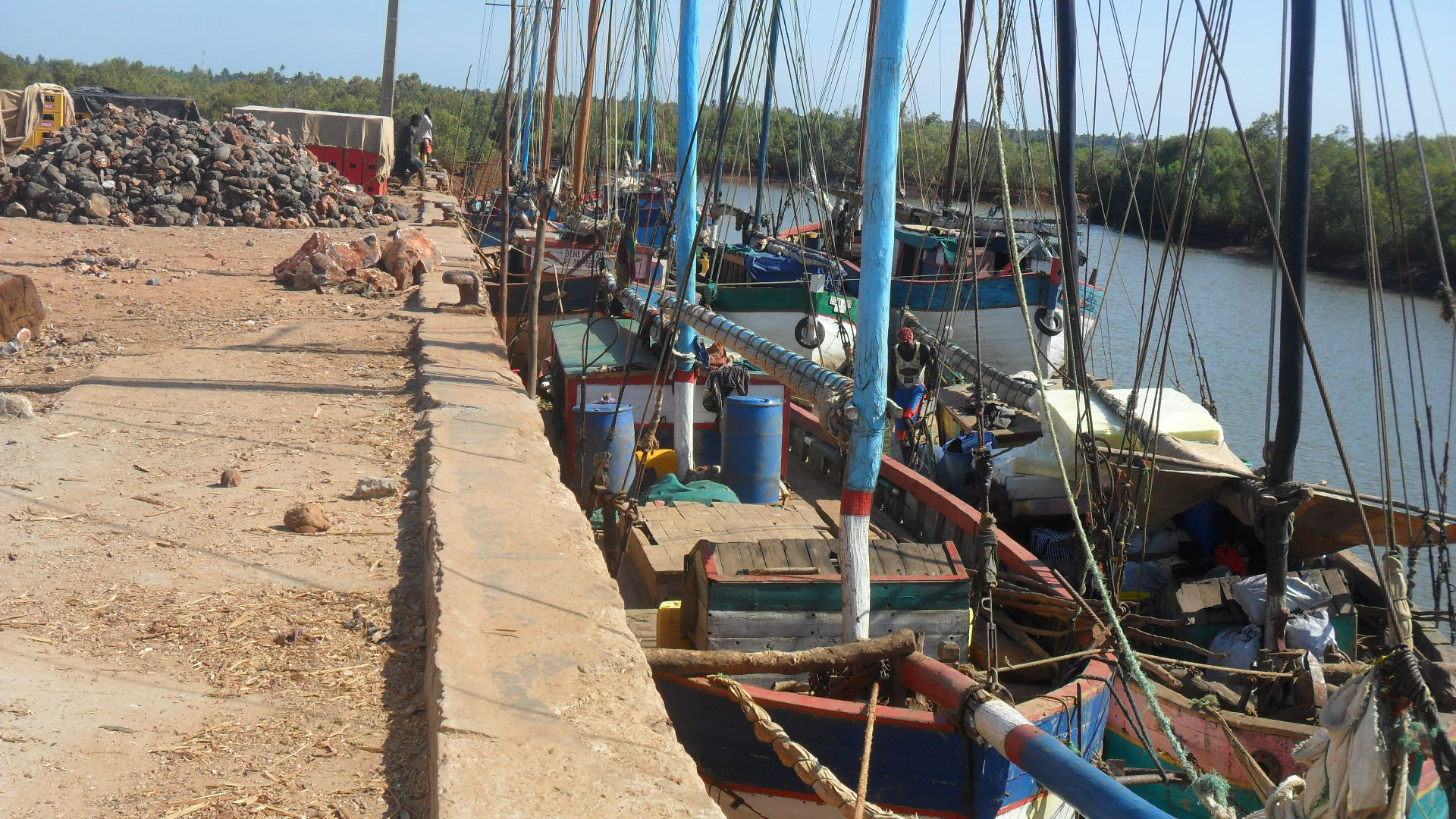
- Port of Maintirano

- Location in Madagascar
- Country: Madagascar
- Capital: Maintirano

Government
  - Gouvernor: Patrick Nerarivony Ratsitohara

Area
  - Total: 38,852 km^{2} (15,001 sq mi)

Population (2018)
  - Total: 309,805
  - Density: 7.9740/km^{2} (20.653/sq mi)
  - Ethnicities: Sakalava
- Time zone: UTC+3 (EAT)
- HDI (2018): 0.463 low · 16th of 22

Melaky is a region in northwestern Madagascar. It borders Boeny Region in northeast, Betsiboka in east, Bongolava in southeast and Menabe in south. The capital of the region is Maintirano. The population was estimated to be 309,805 in 2018 within the area of 38,852 km^{2} (15,001 sq mi). Melaky has the smallest population and the lowest population density of all Malagasy regions.

== Administrative divisions ==
Melaky Region is divided into five districts, which are sub-divided into 32 communes.

- Ambatomainty District - 5 communes
- Antsalova District - 5 communes
- Besalampy District - 6 communes
- Maintirano District - 14 communes
- Morafenobe District - 4 communes

== Transport ==
=== Airports ===
- Ambatomainty Airport
- Antsalova Airport
- Besalampy Airport
- Maintirano Airport
- Morafenobe Airport
- Tambohorano Airport

== Protected Areas ==
The Maningoza Reserve and the Bemarivo Reserve are located in the Melaky region.

- Tsingy de Beanka New Protected Area
- Bemaraha National Park near Bekopaka (south end) and Antsalova (Northern end).
- Part of Ambohijanahary Reserve
- Tsimembo-Manambolomaty Complex
- Mandrozo New Protected Area

== See also ==
- Mahajanga province

== Bibliography ==
- EBDM
