= Tsiroanomandidy =

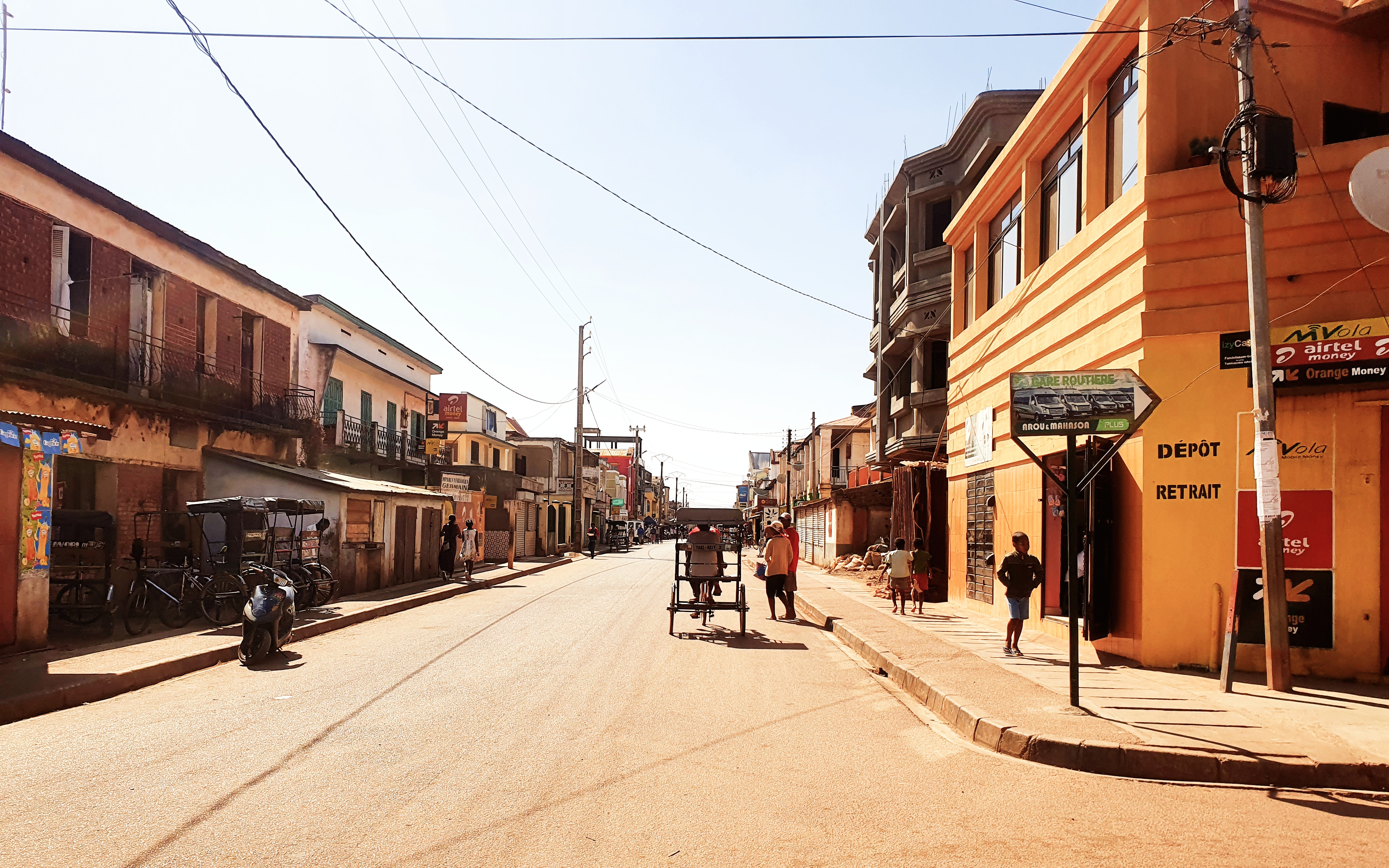
- Main street of Tsiroanomandidy

- Location in Madagascar
- Coordinates: 18°46′11.28″S 46°3′0″E
- Country: Madagascar
- Region: Bongolava
- District: Tsiroanomandidy

Government
  - Mayor: Mananjara Jaona Razafindredohy

Area
  - Total: 35.8 km^{2} (13.8 sq mi)
- Elevation: 860 m (2,820 ft)

Population (2018 census)
  - Total: 44,461
  - Density: 1,240/km^{2} (3,220/sq mi)
- Time zone: UTC3 (EAT)
- Postal code: 119
- Climate: Aw

Tsiroanomandidy [tsiˌrunʷmanˈdidʲ] is a city (commune urbaine) in central-western Madagascar, approximately 210 kilometres west of the capital Antananarivo.

Tsiroanomandidy is the capital of Bongolava Region and of Tsiroanomandidy District. Its name means One person only reigns, and comes from the memories of the victory of king Radama I over his rival Ramitraho, King of the Sakalava in 1822.

== Rivers ==
Situation map of Tsiroanomandidy

Tsiroanomandidy lies on the Manambolo River.

== District of Tsiroanomandidy ==
There are 18 communes in the district with a total of 215 villages (fokontany).

- Ambalanirana - 16 villages - 450 km2 with a population of 27,805
- Ambararatabe 7 villages - 120 km2 with a population of 11,699
- Ambatolampy 10 villages - 152 km2 with a population of 12,584
- Ankadinondry Sakay 22 villages - 376 km2 with a population of 45,522
- Ankerana Avaratra 7 villages - 800 km2 with a population of 11,833
- Anosy 7 villages -209 km2 with a population of 12,582
- Belobaka 18 villages - 137 km2 with a population of 24,346
- Bemahatazana 12 villages - 1,100 km2 with a population of 36,498
- Bevato 12 villages - 357 km2 with a population of 20,360
- Fierenana 11 villages - 3,336 km2 with a population of 21 625
- Fihaonana 20 villages - 1,777 km2 with a population of 63,007
- Mahasolo 16 villages - 934 km2 with a population of 45,485
- Maroharana 7 villages - 450 km2 with a population of 12,343
- Miandanarivo 11 villages - 400 km2 with a population of 17,438
- Soanierana 6 villages - 248 km2 with a population of 9,285
- Tsinjoarivo 10 villages - 450 km2 with a population of 31,213
- Tsiroanomandidy 16 villages - 52 km2 with a population of 42,989

Tsiroanomandidy is pronounced:

- Ts as in boots
- I as in hit
- Ro as in row
- An as in woman
- O as in show
- Man as in man
- Did as in did
- Y as in funny

== Transports ==
The national road RN 1 and Route nationale 1b connects the city with Antananarivo (218 km).

There is an airport.

== Religion ==
- FJKM - Fiangonan'i Jesoa Kristy eto Madagasikara (Church of Jesus Christ in Madagascar)
- Roman Catholic Diocese of Tsiroanomandidy (Cathedral of Our Lady of Good Remedy).
- FIANGONANA BATISTA BIBLIKA (Baptiste church)
- EEM - Eklesia Episkopaly Malagasy (Anglican Church of Madagascar)

== Ethnic groups ==
Merina (55%), Betsileo, Antandroy, Antaisaka live in Tsiroanaomandidy.

== Economy ==
Tsiroanomandidy has the largest Zebu market in Madagascar. More than 1/3 of the tax revenue of the town come from its trade.
