= List of hospitals in Madagascar =

This is a list of hospitals in Madagascar. In 2019, there were 2,677 medical facilities in Madagascar, including 125 hospitals. The other facilities are small health centers and posts. Since most of the hospitals, dispensaries and medical centers are located in urban areas, access to medical care remains beyond the reach of many. Around 35% of the population live more than 10 km from a health facility.

== Hospitals ==
The table below lists the hospitals in Madagascar with the name, city and region, ownership, and coordinates. The map link below the table shows these hospitals on a map of Madagascar.

Hospitals in
Name	City	Region	Ownership	Coordinates	Ref
Alaotra Mangoro Hospital	Ambatondrazaka	Alaotra-Mangoro	Public	17.836092°S 48.416337°E	
Ambalavao Hospital	Ambalavao	Haute Matsiatra	Public	21.8333332356522°S 46.9333333°E	
Ambanja Hospital	Ambanja	Diana Region	Public	13.6833333°S 48.45°E	
Ambatolampy Hospital	Ambatolampy	Vakinankaratra	Public	19.3833333°S 47.4166667°E	
Ambatomainty Hospital	Ambatomainty	Melaky	Public	16.966027°S 44.615918°E	
Ambilobe Hospital	Ambilobe	Diana Region	Public	13.198222°S 49.048801°E	
Amboasary Atsimo Hospital	Amboasary Sud	Anosy Region	Public	25.0333333°S 46.3833333°E	
Ambodifototra Hospital	Ambodifototra	Analanjirofo	Public	16.986398°S 49.856225°E	
Ambohidroa Hospital	Ambohidroa	Analamanga	Public	18.4833333°S 47.1666667°E	
Ambohimahasoa Hospital	Bokona	Haute Matsiatra	Public	21.931482°S 46.81778°E	
Ambohimiandra Hospital	Antananarivo	Analamanga	Public	18.9166667°S 47.5333333°E	
Ambovombe Manandriana Hospital	Ambovombe Afovoany	Amoron'i Mania	Public	20.7666667°S 47.0833333°E	
Amoron'I Mania Hospital	Ambovombe Afovoany	Amoron'i Mania	Public	20.5166667°S 47.25°E	
Ampanihy - Ouest Hospital	Ampanihy	Atsimo-Andrefana	Public	24.7°S 44.75°E	
Amparafaravola Hospital	Amparafaravola	Alaotra-Mangoro	Public	17.5833333°S 48.2166667°E	
Analalava Hospital	Analalava	Sofia Region	Public	14.635288°S 47.749299°E	
Analanjorofo Hospital	Ambodifototra	Analanjirofo	Public	16.995956°S 49.850898°E	
Analaroa Hospital	Ambohitsimenaloha	Analamanga	Public	18.4166667°S 47.7°E	
Andapa Hospital	Andapa	Sava Region	Public	14.648592°S 49.643172°E	
Andilamena Hospital	Andilamena	Alaotra-Mangoro	Public	17.0166667°S 48.5833333°E	
Andramasina Hospital	Andramasina	Analamanga	Public	19.1833333°S 47.5833333°E	
Anjozorobe Hospital	Anjozorobe	Analamanga	Public	18.404836°S 47.878462°E	
Ankazoabo Sud Hospital	Ankazoabo	Atsimo-Andrefana	Public	22.283337°S 44.519614°E	
Ankazobe Hospital	Ankazobe	Analamanga	Public	18.3166667°S 47.1166667°E	
Anosibe An'Ala Hospital	Anosibe An'ala	Alaotra-Mangoro	Public	19.43174°S 48.207062°E	
Anosy Avaratra Hospital	Antananarivo	Analamanga	Public	18.814254°S 47.548543°E	
Anosy Hospital	Taolagnaro	Anosy Region	Public	25.0334°S 47.0667°E	
Antalaha Hospital	Antalaha	Sava Region	Public	14.8833333°S 50.2833333°E	
Antanambao Manampotsy Hospital	Antanambao Manampotsy	Atsinanana	Public	19.4833333°S 48.5666667°E	
Antananarivo Hospital	Antananarivo	Analamanga	Public	18.913611°S 47.536111°E	
Antanifotsy Hospital	Antanifotsy	Vakinankaratra	Public	19.846364°S 47.500539°E	
Antsalova Hospital	Antsalova	Melaky	Public	18.668°S 44.61615°E	
Arivonimamo Hospital	Arivonimamo	Itasy Region	Public	19.0166667°S 47.1833333°E	
Atsimo Andrefana Hospital	Toliara	Atsimo-Andrefana	Public	23.35°S 43.666667°E	
Atsimo Atsinanana Hospital	Farafagana	Atsimo-Atsinanana	Public	22.816667°S 47.816667°E	
Bealanana Hospital	Bealanana	Sofia Region	Public	14.55°S 48.7333333°E	
Befandriana Hospital	Befandriana	Sofia Region	Public	15.2666667°S 48.5333333°E	
Befotaka Hospital	Befotaka	Atsimo-Atsinanana	Public	23.8166667°S 46.9833333°E	
Bekily Hospital	Bekily	Androy	Public	24.2166667°S 45.3166667°E	
Belo Sur Tsiribihina Hospital	Belo Tsiribihina	Menabe	Public	19.699967°S 44.543691°E	
Beloha Hospital	Beloha	Androy	Public	25.1666667°S 45.05°E	
Benenitra Hospital	Benenitra	Atsimo-Andrefana	Public	23.45°S 45.0833333°E	
Beroroha Hospital	Beroroha	Atsimo-Andrefana	Public	21.675°S 45.148°E	
Besalampy Hospital	Besalampy	Melaky	Public	16.75°S 44.4833333°E	
Betafo Hospital	Betafo	Vakinankaratra	Public	19.8333333°S 46.85°E	
Betioky- Sud Hospital	Betioky	Atsimo-Andrefana	Public	23.723362°S 44.379447°E	
Betroka Hospital	Betroka	Anosy Region	Public	23.2666667°S 46.0833333°E	
Betsiboka Hospital	Betsiboka	Betsiboka	Public	16.8666667°S 46.95°E	
Bezaha Hospital	Ambararata	Atsimo-Andrefana	Public	23.597969°S 44.659344°E	
Bongolava Hospital	Bongolava	Bongolava	Public	18.77°S 46.05°E	
Brickaville Hospital	Brickaville	Atsinanana	Public	18.818104°S 49.068679°E	
Centre D'Appareillage de Madagascar Hospital	Antananarivo	Analamanga	Public	18.940875°S 47.537977°E	
Centre de Créno-Thermo-Climatisme Antsirabe Hospital	Antsirabe	Vakinankaratra	Public	19.85°S 47.0333333°E	
Centre de Rééducation Motrice de Madagascar Antsirabe Hospital	Antsirabe	Vakinankaratra	Public	19.850117°S 47.031433°E	
Centre de Stomatologie Et Chirurgie Maxillo-Faciale Hospital	Antananarivo	Analamanga	Public	18.933908°S 47.544356°E	
Centre Odonto-Stomatologie Hospital	Mahajanga	Boeny	Public	15.722093°S 46.312103°E	
Diana Hospital	Antisaranna	Diana Region	Public	12.27°S 49.28°E	
Emmanuel Andriamampihantona Hospital	Ambatofinandrahana	Amoron'i Mania	Public	20.555714°S 46.804611°E	
Etablis Univers de Soins Et de Santé Pub Analakely Hospital	Antananarivo	Analamanga	Public	18.90156°S 47.515134°E	
Fandriana Hospital	Alakamisy	Amoron'i Mania	Public	20.2°S 47.2833333°E	
Faratsiho Hospital	Faratsiho	Vakinankaratra	Public	19.4°S 46.95°E	
Fenoarivobe Hospital	Fenoarivobe	Bongolava	Public	18.451505°S 46.56369°E	
Fianarantsoa Hospital	Fianarantsoa	Haute Matsiatra	Public	21.4333333°S 47.0833333°E	
Groupe Hospitalier Mère-Enfant Befelatanana Hospital	Antananarivo	Analamanga	Public	18.918603°S 47.523228°E	
Hôpital Androva	Mahajanga	Boeny	Public	15.717755°S 46.305991°E	
Hôpital Cenhosoa Hospital	Antananarivo	Analamanga	Public	18.900734346485°S 47.5307178497314°E	
Hôpital Fenoarivo Hospital	Firavahana	Analamanga	Public	18.5166667°S 47.05°E	
Hôpital Joseph Raseta Befelatanana Hospital	Antananarivo	Analamanga	Public	18.9170045665755°S 47.5232505798339°E	
Hôpital Pédiatrie Ambohimiandra Hospital	Antananarivo	Analamanga	Public	18.915723°S 47.534717°E	
Iakora Hospital	Iakora	Ihorombe	Public	23.100581°S 46.648191°E	
Ifanadiana Hospital	Ifanadiana	Vatovavy-Fitovinany	Public	21.3°S 47.6333333°E	
Ihorombe Hospital	Marofivango	Ihorombe	Public	22.3°S 46.2°E	
Ikalamavony Hospital	Ikalamavony	Haute Matsiatra	Public	21.15°S 46.5833333°E	
Ikongo Hospital	Fort-Carnot	Vatovavy-Fitovinany	Public	21.8833333°S 47.4333333°E	
Itaosy Hospital	Antananarivo	Analamanga	Public	18.917262°S 47.466361°E	
Itasy Hospital	Miarinarivo	Itasy Region	Public	18.95°S 46.95°E	
Ivohibe Hospital	Ivohibe	Ihorombe	Public	22.4833333°S 46.8833333°E	
Joseph Ravoahangy Andrianavalona Hospital	Antananarivo	Analamanga	Public	18.919722°S 47.5180556°E	
Kandreho Hospital	Kandreho	Betsiboka	Public	17.484615°S 46.090976°E	
Loterana Manambaro Hospital	Manambaro, Fort Dauphin	Anosy Region	Public	25.0333333°S 46.8166667°E	
Lutheran Hospital of Ambohibao	Ambohibao	Antananarivo	Faith-based	18.8509169465077°S 47.47644243888813°E	
Mahabo Hospital	Mahabo	Menabe	Public	20.381451°S 44.664886°E	
Mahajanga Hospital	Mahajanga	Boeny	Public	15.7166667°S 46.3166667°E	
Mahanoro Hospital	Mahanoro	Atsinanana	Public	19.898149°S 48.800303°E	
Mahitsy Hospital	Mahitsy	Analamanga	Public	18.7333333°S 47.3333333°E	
Mampikomy Hospital	Mampikomy	Sofia Region	Public	16.1°S 47.6333333°E	
Manakavaly Hospital	Anjepy	Analamanga	Public	18.8333333°S 47.7166667°E	
Mananara-Nord Hospital	Mananara Avaratra	Analanjirofo	Public	16.168065°S 49.765773°E	
Mananjary Hospital	Mananjary	Vatovavy-Fitovinany	Public	21.2166667°S 48.3333333°E	
Mandritsara Hospital	Mandritsara	Sofia Region	Public	15.843427°S 48.821347°E	
Manja Hospital	Manja	Menabe	Public	21.4456°S 44.33345°E	
Manjakandriana Hospital	Manjakandriana	Analamanga	Public	18.911379°S 47.798165°E	
Maroantsetra Hospital	Maroantsetra	Analanjirofo	Public	15.436631°S 49.730607°E	
Marolambo Hospital	Marolambo	Atsinanana	Public	20.05°S 48.1166667°E	
Marovoay Hospital	Marovoay	Boeny	Public	16.1°S 46.6333333°E	
Melaky Hospital	Melaky	Melaky	Public	17.6°S 44.8°E	
Menabe Hospital	Menabe	Menabe	Public	20.283889°S 44.3175°E	
Miandrivazo Hospital	Miandrivazo	Menabe	Public	19.5166667°S 45.4666667°E	
Midongy Du Sud Hospital	Midongy Du Sud	Atsimo-Atsinanana	Public	23.593531°S 47.021592°E	
Mitsinjo Hospital	Mitsinjo	Boeny	Public	16°S 45.8666667°E	
Monja Jaona Hospital	Ambovombe	Androy	Public	25.178126°S 46.089499°E	
Morafenobe Hospital	Morafenobe	Melaky	Public	17.8166667°S 44.9166667°E	
Moramanga Hospital	Moramanga	Alaotra-Mangoro	Public	16.5°S 48.3666667°E	
Morombe Hospital	Morombe	Atsimo-Andrefana	Public	21.748951°S 43.336581°E	
Nosy Be Hospital	Anjiabe	Diana Region	Public	12.13333°S 49.3666667°E	
Nosy Varika Hospital	Nosy Varika	Vatovavy-Fitovinany	Public	20.5878958°S 48.5352990°E	
Pavillon Sainte Fleur Hospital	Antananarivo	Analamanga	Public	18.9201711377975°S 47.5179719924926°E	
Port Bergé Hospital	Ampombibitika	Sofia Region	Public	15.5666667°S 47.6166667°E	
Sakalalina Hospital	Sakalalina	Ihorombe	Public	22.3333333°S 46.4833333°E	
Sakaraha Hospital	Sakaraha	Atsimo-Andrefana	Public	22.9°S 44.5333333°E	
SALFA Hospital Sambava	Sambava	Sava Region	Public	14.278611°S 50.174722°E	
SALFA Hospital Vohemar	Vohemar	Sava Region	Public	13.363531670733515°S 49.99810073878954°E	
Soalala Hospital	Soalala	Boeny	Public	16.101759°S 45.327048°E	
Soanierana-Ivongo Hospital	Soanierana-Ivongo	Analanjirofo	Public	16.9166667°S 49.5833333°E	
Soavinandriana Military Hospital	Antananarivo	Itasy Region	Military hospital	19.166684°S 46.73304°E	
Sofia Hospital	Antsohihy	Sofia Region	Public	14.8666667°S 47.9833333°E	
Toamasina Hospital	Toamasina	Atsinanana	Public	18.1666667°S 49.3833333°E	
Tsaratanana Hospital	Tsaratanana	Betsiboka	Public	16.7833333°S 47.65°E	
Tsaralalana Mother-Child University Hospital Center	Antananarivo	Analamanga	Public	18.901035°S 47.516767°E	
Tsihombe Hospital	Tsihombe	Androy	Public	25.3°S 45.4833333°E	
Vakinakaratra Hospital	Antsirabe	Vakinankaratra	Public	19.885352°S 47.087554°E	
Vangaindrano Hospital	Vangaindrano	Atsimo-Atsinanana	Public	23.35°S 47.6°E	
Vatomandry Hospital	Vatomandry	Atsinanana	Public	19.332867°S 48.980655°E	
Vatovavy Fitovinany Hospital	Manakara	Vatovavy-Fitovinany	Public	22.145278°S 48.015556°E	
Vavatenina Hospital	Vavatenina	Analanjirofo	Public	17.466022°S 49.196177°E	
Vohipeno Hospital	Vohipeno	Vatovavy-Fitovinany	Public	22.35°S 47.8333333°E	
Vondrozo Hospital	Vondrozo	Atsimo-Atsinanana	Public	22.8166667°S 47.2833333°E	
