= Ambohiby Massif =

Collapsed volcano in central Madagascar

Ambohiby Massif Andranomangatsiaka (Malagasy)
- Ring complex
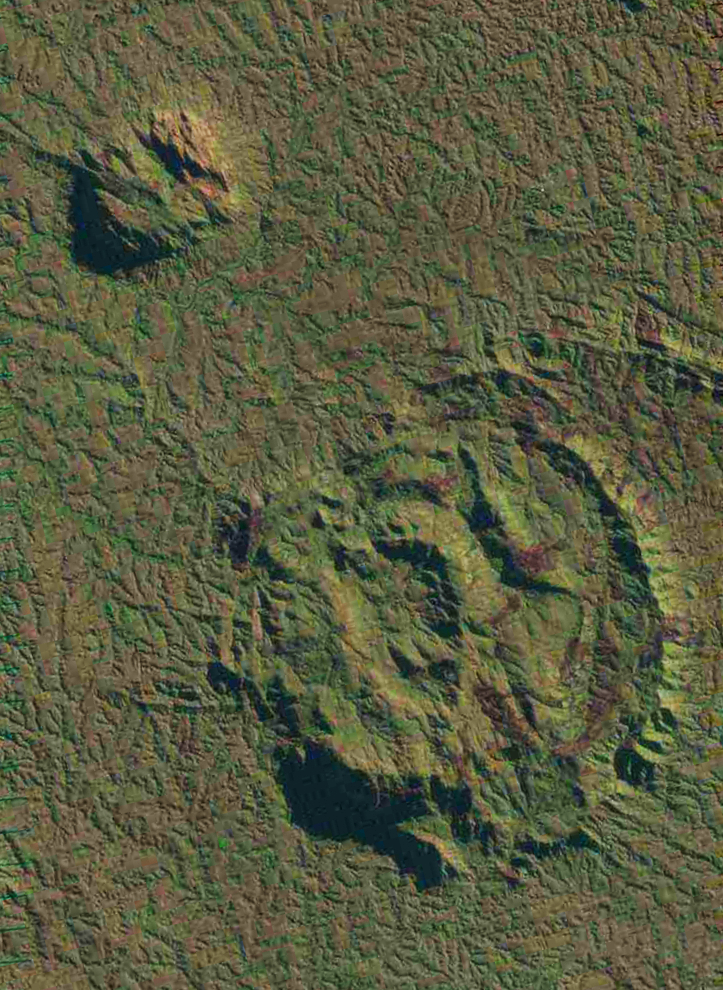
- The massif (lower right) as seen by the Landsat 7 satellite.

- Coordinates: 18.836°S 46.206°E
- Location: Bongolava, Madagascar
- Age: 90 million years (Late Cretaceous)
- Formed by: Collapse caldera event due to tectonic separation of India and Madagascar.

Area
  - Total: 225 square kilometres (87 sq mi)

Dimensions
  - Height: 1,630 metres (5,350 ft)

Ambohiby Massif is an alkaline ring complex in Tsiroanomandidy District, Bongolava, Madagascar, which covers approximately 225 km^{2} (87 sq mi).

The settlement of Anosibe Ambohiby, which has a population of about 300 Betsileo people, is located within the complex, almost entirely isolated from the rest of the region; the closest settlement is the town of Antaniditra, 8 km (5.0 mi) away, and the nearest city, Tsiroanomandidy, is 18 km (11 mi) away.

== History ==
Ambihoby Massif (the dark circle at the center) as seen by the Sentinel 3 satellite.

The massif was formed around 90 million years ago during the Late Cretaceous period, during the breakup of the supercontinent Gondwana, as the Madagascar Plate and the Indian Plate separated. Originally it was a volcano, however as the tectonic plates separated, the Marion hotspot supplying it was cut off, causing the volcano to cool and collapse as it had no heat source.The extinct volcanic crater is approximately 15km wide.

According to the record from French botanist Jacques Désiré Leandri published in 1935, the crater was called 'Andranomangatsiaka' (translating to 'at the place of cold water'), not to be confused with the current namesake down south, by the area's indigenous people. Leandri also described the massif as having two peaks which dominate it, one called Andapa which was used as a geodetic point. He also said that the western part of the wooded region is named Ampihirano.

Anosibe Ambohiby, a settlement of Betsileo citrus farmers and merchants, was established on the volcano in 2008.
