= Tsiroanomandidy District =

Tsiroanomandidy
- District
- Location within Madagascar
- Coordinates: 18°46′11.28″S 46°3′0″E
- Country: Madagascar
- Region: Bongolava

Area
  - Total: 4,540 sq mi (11,758 km^{2})
  - Land: 4,540 sq mi (11,758 km^{2})

Population (2020)
  - Total: 521,372
  - Density: 114.84/sq mi (44.342/km^{2})

Tsiroanomandidy is a district of Bongolava in Madagascar. The district has an area of 10,559 km^{2} (4,077 sq mi), and the estimated population in 2020 was 521,372.

== Transport ==
The national road RN 1 and Route nationale 1b connects the city with Antananarivo (218 km).

There is an airport.

== Economy ==
Tsiroanomandidy has the largest Zebu market in Madagascar. More than 1/3 of the tax revenue of the town come from its trade.

== Communes ==
The district is further divided into 18 communes; which are further sub-divided into 215 villages (fokontany):

- Ambalanirana - 16 villages - 450 km^{2} with a population of 27,805
- Ambararatabe - 7 villages - 120 km^{2} with a population of 11,699
- Ambatolampy - 10 villages - 152 km^{2} with a population of 12,584
- Ankadinondry Sakay - 22 villages - 376 km^{2} with a population of 45,522
- Ankerana Avaratra - 7 villages - 800 km^{2} with a population of 11,833
- Anosy - 7 villages -209 km^{2} with a population of 12,582
- Belobaka - 18 villages - 137 km^{2} with a population of 24,346
- Bemahatazana - 12 villages - 1,100 km^{2} with a population of 36,498
- Bevato - 12 villages - 357 km^{2} with a population of 20,360
- Fierenana - 11 villages - 3,336 km^{2} with a population of 21,625
- Fihaonana - 20 villages - 1,777 km^{2} with a population of 63,007
- Mahasolo - 16 villages - 934 km^{2} with a population of 45,485
- Maroharana - 7 villages - 450 km^{2} with a population of 12,343
- Miandanarivo - 11 villages - 400 km^{2} with a population of 17,438
- Soanierana - 6 villages - 248 km^{2} with a population of 9,285
- Tsinjoarivo Imanga - 10 villages - 450 km^{2} with a population of 31,213
- Tsiroanomandidy - 16 villages - 52 km^{2} with a population of 42,989

== See also ==
- Anosibe Ambohiby
