= Anosibe Ambohiby =

Village in Tsiroanomandidy, Madagascar

- Village
- Aerial image of the village in 2023
- Interactive map of Anosibe Ambohiby
- Coordinates: 18°50′26.3″S 46°12′15.2″E
- Country: Madagascar
- Region: Bongolava
- District: Tsiroanomandidy

Population
  - Estimate (2023): 300
- Time zone: UTC+3 (EAT)

Anosibe Ambohiby is a village in the Central Highlands of Madagascar, located in the crater of the extinct volcano Ambohiby Massif.

The village is situated in the district of Tsiroanomandidy, which is in the Bongolava Region.

== History ==
Anosibe Ambohiby was founded in 2008 by Betsileo farmers from the Manandriana District, about 380 kilometres (240 mi) to the south. As overcrowding worsened in their hometown, the farmers migrated in search of a large plot of arable land. Razafinatala, a village elder, suggested the space as a settlement location for its abundant space for farming. The village grows cash crops, primarily citrus fruit, which they sell in the markets of neighboring cities, though transportation in and out of the village is a challenge due to the poor distribution and conditions of local roads. As of 2023, the village is made up of around 50 houses with a population of around 300 people.

== Etymology ==
Anosibe translates to "Big Island" in the Malagasy language (from root word nosy) and refers to the village's geography; it is surrounded by four streams reminiscent of an island surrounded by water on all sides. Ambohiby is the name of the alkaline ring complex Anosibe Ambohiby is located on, known as Ambohiby Massif.

== Geography ==
The village of Anosibe Ambohiby is situated in the center of the Ambohiby Massif, a massive alkaline ring complex over 13 kilometers in diameter, dating back to the Late Cretaceous. This volcanic geological formation, associated with the separation of Madagascar and India, contributes to the region's unique landscape. The massif, characterized by its fertile soil due to alkaline chemicals, hosts the village in its crater. It is flanked by four streams running in the north, south, east, and west, all part of the alkaline ring structure. The village, surrounded by vegetation, is a part of the district of Tsiroanomandidy, which is situated in the Bongolava Region. It lies 8 kilometers from the nearest labeled town, Antaniditra, and 18 kilometers from the closest major city, Tsiroanomandidy.

== Demographics ==
The approximately 300 residents of Anosibe Ambohiby are of the Betsileo ethnic group, and migrated from the Manadriana District of Central Madagascar to settle in the crater. The people are mostly employed in agriculture, with a large portion of land dedicated to farming oranges and lemons which the villagers sell at market themselves.
