= Miarinarivo (disambiguation) =

Miarinarivo may refer to several places in Madagascar:

- Miarinarivo, a city in Itasy Region.
- Miarinarivo II, a rural municipality in Itasy Region, covering the villages around Miarinarivo
- Miarinarivo, Andilamena, a rural municipality in Andilamena District, Alaotra-Mangoro Region.
- Miarinarivo, Vavatenina, a rural municipality in Vavatenina District, Analanjirofo Region.
- Miarinarivo, Ambalavao, a rural municipality in Haute Matsiatra, Madagascar
