= Fihaonana, Tsiroanomandidy =

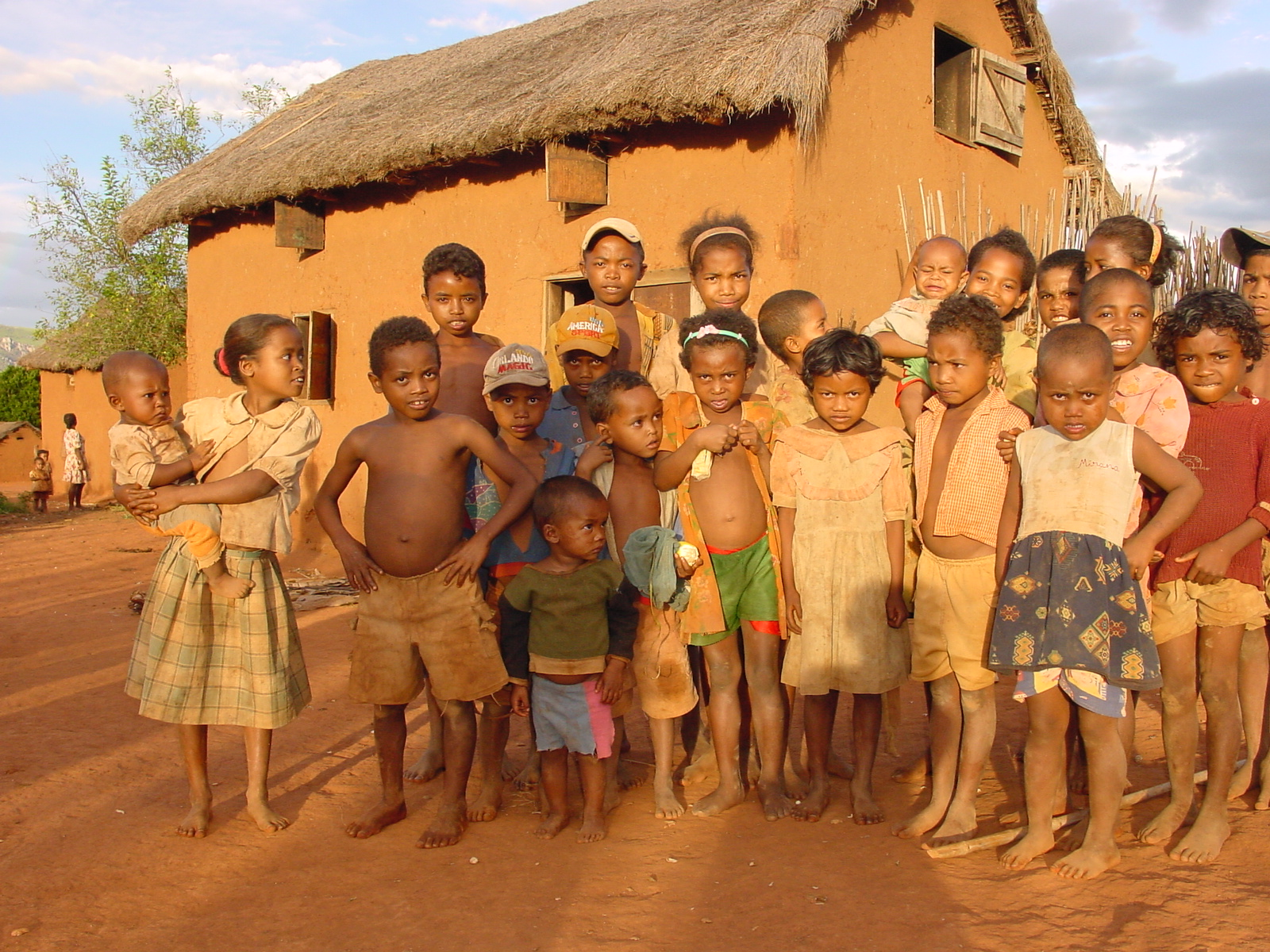
- a family in Akanditapaka, a fokontany of this municipality

- Location in Madagascar
- Coordinates: 18°42′S 45°55′E
- Country: Madagascar
- Region: Bongolava
- District: Tsiroanomandidy

Area
  - Land: 1,777 km^{2} (686 sq mi)
- Elevation: 779 m (2,556 ft)

Population (2001)
  - Total: 27,000
- Time zone: UTC3 (EAT)
- Postal code: 119

Fihaonana, Tsiroanomandidy is a rural municipality in Madagascar. It belongs to the district of Tsiroanomandidy, which is a part of Bongolava Region. The population of the commune was estimated to be approximately 27,000 in 2001. It is situated at 15km east of Tsiroanomandidy along the National road 1bis at 219 km from Antananarivo.

Only primary schooling is available. The majority 59% of the population of the commune are farmers, while an additional 40% receives their livelihood from raising livestock. The most important crops are rice and maize; also cassava is an important agricultural product. Services provide employment for 1% of the population.
