= Ankadinondry Sakay =

Ankadinondry Sakay Babetville
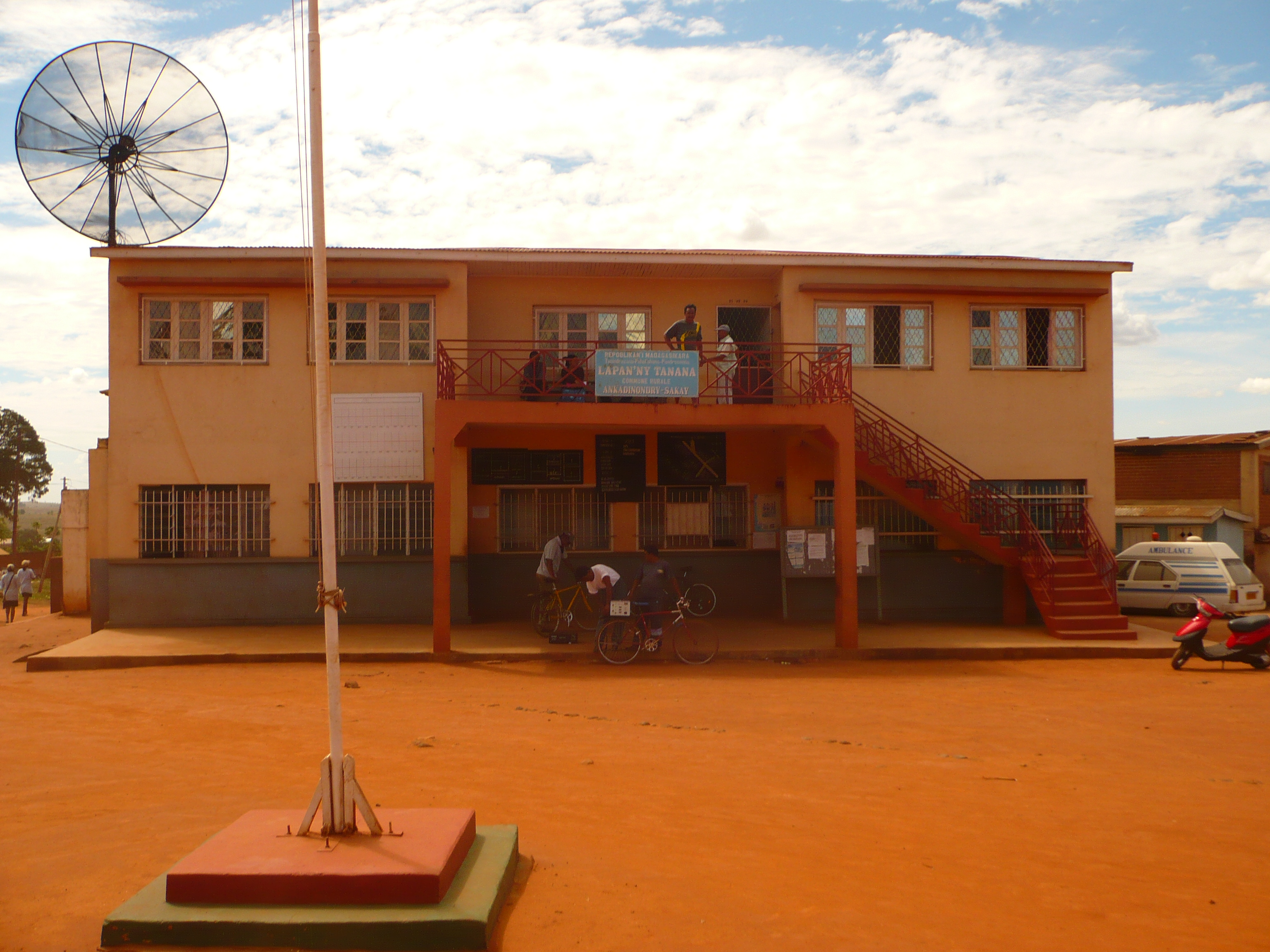
- town hall

- Location in Madagascar
- Coordinates: 19°00′00″S 46°27′50″E
- Country: Madagascar
- Region: Bongolava
- District: Tsiroanomandidy
- Elevation: 922 m (3,025 ft)

Population (2018)
  - Total: 54,217
- Time zone: UTC3 (EAT)

Ankadinondry Sakay, anciently Babetville is a town and commune in Madagascar. It belongs to the district of Tsiroanomandidy, which is a part of Bongolava Region.

It is situated at the Route nationale 1b between Analavory and Tsiroanomandidy at a distance of 35 km from Analavory.

The population of the commune was estimated to be approximately 54,217 in 2018.

Primary and junior level secondary education are available in town. The majority 80% of the population of the commune are farmers, while an additional 5% receives their livelihood from raising livestock. The most important crop is rice, while other important products are maize and cassava. Industry and services provide employment for 0.5% and 14.5% of the population, respectively.

== Roads ==
The national road RN 1b from Tsiroanomandidy to Analavory crosses the town.

== Rivers ==
The commune is crossed by the Sakay river.
