= Miarinarivo District =

Miarinarivo
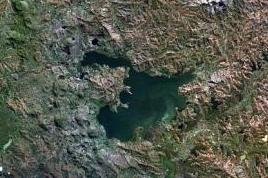
- aerial photo, in the middle: Itasy lake and Ampefy

- Location in Madagascar
- Coordinates: 18°57′39″S 46°54′00″E
- Country: Madagascar
- Region: Itasy
- District: Miarinarivo

Area
  - Land: 17.9 km^{2} (6.9 sq mi)

Population
  - Ethnicities: Merina
- Time zone: UTC3 (EAT)
- Postal code: 117

Miarinarivo is a district of Itasy in Madagascar. It is located approximately 100 km east of Antananarivo.

== Municipalities ==
The district is formed by 12 municipalities:

- Ambatomanjaka
- Analavory
- Andolofotsy
- Anosibe Ifanja
- Manazary
- Mandiavato
- Miarinarivo
- Miarinarivo II
- Sarobaratra Ifanja
- Soamahamanina
- Soavimbahoaka
- Zoma Bealoka

== Roads ==
Miarinarivo is crossed by the National Road 1 that leads from Antananarivo to Tsiroanomandidy.

== Sights ==
- Geysers in Analavory.
- Lily falls of the Sakay River near Ampefy.

== Lakes ==
- Lake Itasy the forth mayor lake of Madagascar.
