= Ambatomainty Atsimo =

- Location within Madagascar
- Country: Madagascar
- Region: Bongolava
- District: Fenoarivobe

Population (2018)
  - Total: 6,781
- Time zone: UTC+03:00 (EAT)

Ambatomainty Atsimo is a town and commune in Madagascar. It belongs to the district of Fenoarivobe, which is a part of Bongolava Region. The population of the commune was estimated to be approximately 6,781 in 2018.

Only primary schooling is available. The majority 98% of the population of the commune are farmers. The most important crop is rice, while other important products are maize, cassava and taro. Services provide employment for 2% of the population.

== References and notes ==
}
