= Kiranomena =

- Location in Madagascar
- Coordinates: 18°17′S 46°3′E
- Country: Madagascar
- Region: Bongolava
- District: Fenoarivobe
- Elevation: 650 m (2,130 ft)

Population (2018)
  - Total: 32,354
- Time zone: UTC3 (EAT)

Kiranomena is a town and commune in Madagascar. It belongs to the district of Fenoarivobe, which is a part of Bongolava Region. The population of the commune was estimated to be approximately 32,354 in 2018 commune census.

Primary and junior level secondary education are available in town. The majority 95% of the population of the commune are farmers. The most important crop is rice, while other important products are peanuts and cassava. Services provide employment for 5% of the population.

== Rivers ==
The Sandrozo rivers crosses the town of Kiranomena.
