= Manazary =

- Location in Madagascar
- Coordinates: 19°3′S 46°52′E
- Country: Madagascar
- Region: Itasy
- District: Miarinarivo
- Elevation: 1,271 m (4,170 ft)

Population (2001)
  - Total: 37,000
  - Ethnicities: Merina
- Time zone: UTC3 (EAT)
- Postal code: 117

Manazary is a commune in Madagascar. It belongs to the district of Miarinarivo, which is a part of Itasy Region. The population of the commune was estimated to be approximately 37,000 in a 2001 commune census.

Primary and junior level secondary education is available in the town. The majority of the commune works in agriculture. The most harvested crop in the commune is rice, followed by cassava and tomatoes. Approximately 40% Of the population of the commune work in fishing, and the remaining 5% work in service industries.

== Religion ==
- FJKM - Fiangonan'i Jesoa Kristy eto Madagasikara (Church of Jesus Christ in Madagascar)

== Sights ==
The grave of the king Andriambahoaka Afovoanitany.

== Lakes ==
The Lake Itasy, the forth mayor lake of Madagascar, is partly situated in this municipality.
