= Zoma =

Zoma can refer to:

- Zoma, an antagonist character in Dragon Warrior III, a console role-playing game
- La Zoma, a town in the province of Teruel, Aragón, Spain
- Zoma (spider), a genus of ray spider (family Theridiosomatidae)
- Zoma Museum, artist in residency project in Addis Ababa and Harla, Ethiopia
- Zoma Bealoka, town in Miarinarivo, Madagascar
- Mohamed Ali Zoma (born 2003), Italian footballer
- Simeon ben Zoma (fl. 100–200 AD), Hebrew Tanna
- Zoma Baitler (1908–1994), Lithuanian-Uruguayan artist and diplomat
- Izingane Zoma, South African Maskandi musical group
