= Mount Rosseau =

Mountain in the country of Canada

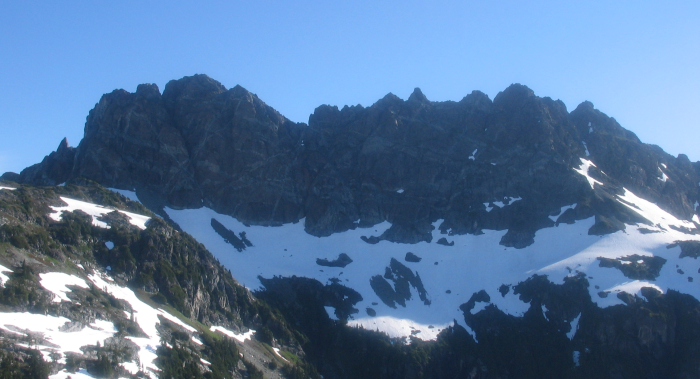

Highest point
- Elevation: 1,958 m (6,424 ft)
- Prominence: 613 m (2,011 ft)
- Coordinates: 49°28′44.0″N 125°30′22.0″W

Geography
- Location within Vancouver Island Location within British Columbia
- Interactive map of Mount Rosseau
- Location: Vancouver Island, British Columbia, Canada
- District: Clayoquot Land District
- Parent range: Vancouver Island Ranges
- Topo map: NTS 92F5 Bedwell River

Mount Rosseau is a mountain on Vancouver Island, British Columbia, Canada, located 43 km (27 mi) southwest of Courtenay and 23 km (14 mi) south of Mount Albert Edward. It is the highest summit of the Septimus-Rosseau massif. The most western summit of the massif is Mount Septimus.

Mount Rosseau is part of the Vancouver Island Ranges which in turn form part of the Insular Mountains.

== History ==
The BC Geographical Names Information System records the origin of Mt Rosseau's name:

[Mount Rosseau is named after] Ralph Rosseau, a widely known and respected elementary school principal in Port Alberni and a noted mountaineer; killed in a climbing accident on Mount Septimus 3 July 1954. (obituary & photograph in West Coast Advocate, 8 July 1954, file T.1.43) Source: BC place name cards, or correspondence to/from BC's Chief Geographer or BC Geographical Names Office

== Access ==
Mount Septimus has three established access routes:

1. From Cream Lake, the south aspect can be accessed by ascending the wide couloir to the shoulder west of Mount Septimus' summit. Cream Lake can be accessed from:
  - Bedwell Lake Trail, the traverse west to Cream Lake. Accesses west aspect. Quickest & easiest approach.
  - Price Creek Trail to Cream Lake. Accesses west aspect. The Price Creek Trail is not maintained and is overgrown.
2. Della Falls Trail to Love Lake. Bushwack west up to a ridge, then head north on the ridge to the mountains flanks. Accesses south aspect.
3. Flower Ridge Trail to Price Pass. Scramble off of Flower Ridge to the pass between Green and Margret Lakes. Route finding difficulties from the pass onto the mountains flanks. Accesses north aspect.

== Gallery ==
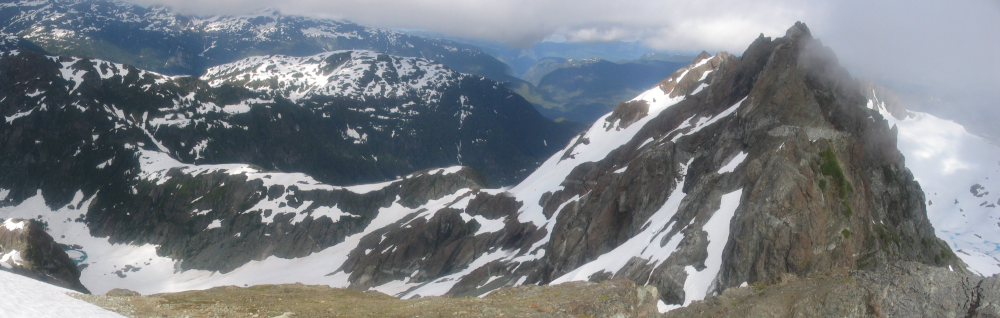
Flower Ridge (left), Price Pass (center) and Mt Rosseau (right)

== See also ==
- List of mountains in Strathcona Provincial Park
- List of mountains of Canada
