= Mahajeby =

- Location in Madagascar
- Coordinates: 18°03′S 46°00′E
- Country: Madagascar
- Region: Bongolava
- District: Fenoarivobe
- Elevation: 663 m (2,175 ft)

Population (2018)
  - Total: 9,741
- Time zone: UTC3 (EAT)
- Postal code: 115

Mahajeby is a municipality in Madagascar. It belongs to the district of Fenoarivobe, which is a part of Bongolava Region. The population of the commune was estimated to be approximately 9,741 in 2018.

It lies between the Mahavavy Sud River.

A populations of Propithecus coronatus was recently found in a forest remains nearby.
