= Bernard Ravelonjato =

Malagasy politician

Bernard Ravelonjato is a Malagasy politician. A member of the National Assembly of Madagascar, he was elected as an independent; he represents the constituency of Miarinarivo.
