= Roland Ravatomanga =

Malagasy politician

Roland Ravatomanga (born August 13, 1951, in Miarinarivo) is a prominent Malagasy statesman and political leader who has served in both the executive and legislative branches of the Government of Madagascar. A senior member of the Tiako I Madagasikara (TIM) party, Ravatomanga rose to national prominence during the presidency of Marc Ravalomanana. He notably served as the Minister of Agriculture under the consensus government formed during the Malagasy political transition, where he was tasked with modernizing the nation's agrarian policies and improving food security. In his legislative career, he has represented the Bongolava region as a member of the Senate of Madagascar, acting as a key voice for rural development and regional interests. His tenure is marked by his consistent advocacy for the TIM party's platform and his involvement in national reconciliation efforts following periods of political instability in the country.
