= Ambatomanjaka =

- Location in Madagascar
- Coordinates: 18°53′S 46°52′E
- Country: Madagascar
- Region: Itasy
- District: Miarinarivo
- Elevation: 1,351 m (4,432 ft)

Population (2001)
  - Total: 15,000
  - Ethnicities: Merina
- Time zone: UTC3 (EAT)
- Climate: Cwb

Ambatomanjaka is a town and commune in Madagascar. It belongs to the district 10 km north-west of Miarinarivo, which is a part of Itasy Region. The population of the commune was estimated to be approximately 15,000 in 2001 commune census.

Primary and junior level secondary education are available in town. The majority 85% of the population of the commune are farmers. The most important crop is rice, while other important products are maize and cassava. Services provide employment for 15% of the population.

== Religion ==
- FJKM - Fiangonan'i Jesoa Kristy eto Madagasikara (Church of Jesus Christ in Madagascar).
