= Andrianavalona Fanomezanjaka Pierrot Ranaivoson =

Malagasy politician

Andrianavalona Fanomezanjaka Pierrot Ranaivoson is a Malagasy politician. He is a member of the National Assembly of Madagascar, he was elected as a member of the Tiako I Madagasikara party in the 2007 Malagasy parliamentary elections and in the 2013 Malagasy general elections. He represents the constituency of Fenoarivobe.
