= Augustin Andriamananoro =

Malagasy politician (born 1968)

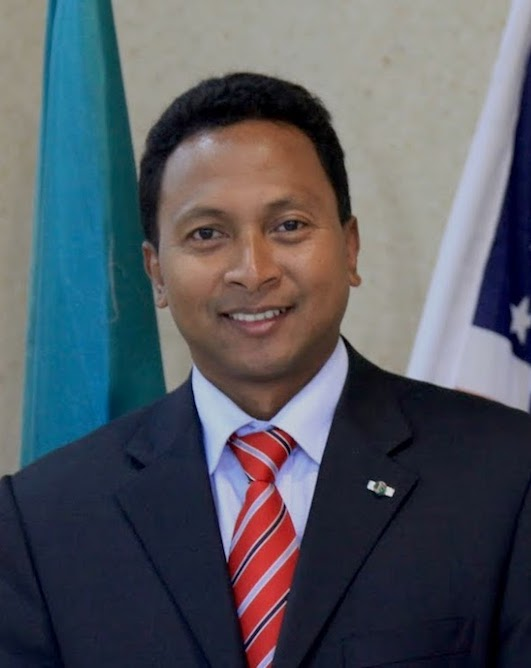
- Born: 14 August 1968 (age 58); Soamahamanina, Madagascar
- Office: Executive Manager of the Presidency of Madagascar in charge of Presidential Projects

Augustin Andriamananoro (born 14 August 1968 in Soamahamanina, Madagascar) is the Executive Manager of the Presidency of Madagascar, overseeing Presidential Projects. He previously held the position of Minister of Halieutic Resources and Fisheries from June 2018 to January 2019.

== Career ==
=== General Manager of the Presidency of Madagascar ===
After Madagascar’s December 2018 election, President Andry Rajoelina appointed Augustin Andriamananoro as General Manager of the Presidency, where he oversees a range of presidential projects.

=== Minister of Halieutic Resources and Fisheries ===
Under President Hery Rajaonarimampianina’s administration, Augustin Andriamananoro served as Madagascar’s Minister of Halieutic Resources and Fisheries from June 2018 to January 2019. During his tenure, he led initiatives focused on the reforestation of mangrove ecosystems and the promotion of the blue economy. Notably, he represented Madagascar at the inaugural Sustainable Blue Economy Conference held in Nairobi, Kenya, from 26 to 28 November 2018. This global summit, co-hosted by Kenya, Canada, and Japan, convened over 18,000 participants from 184 countries to discuss sustainable utilization of ocean resources and the advancement of marine-based economic activities.

=== ICT Project Manager ===
In 1998, Andriamananoro gained experience in software engineering and information technologies while in France. Afterwards, he engaged in numerous projects in the Caribbean and Indian Ocean. He was also the project director of Société M & Associés in Guadeloupe in 2002, as well as the General Manager of the Osmosis Business Solutions O.I. group in Antananarivo until 2008. Andriamananoro continued to serve as the General Director to the Malagasy Authority Office for the Study and Regulation of Telecommunications for Madagascar OMERT.

Andriamananoro was certified by the Galilee Institute of Management in Israel. In his capacity as ICT Senior Manager, he was also certified by EMPIM.

== Public figure ==
In November 2009, as Minister of Telecommunications, Post and New Technology, he enabled the trunk routes on fiber optic cable for the entirety of East Africa, a project known as Project Lion. This connected East Africa to East Asia and Europe with submarine internet fiber-optic cables. Andriamananoro ensured third-party access by other telecommunications and infrastructure operators, and established licenses for 3G Internet service, which now cover the entire country of Madagascar.

He became the chairman of the Board to the National Shareholding Company (SONAPAR) from December 2010 to December 2014.

During this time, he was the official General Manager of the Authority Office on Regulation of Madagascar Telecommunications, OMERT. He relieved his post in May 2014.
