= Conus sugillatus =

Scientific classification
- Kingdom: Animalia
- Phylum: Mollusca
- Class: Gastropoda
- Subclass: Caenogastropoda
- Order: Neogastropoda
- Superfamily: Conoidea
- Family: Conidae
- Genus: Conus
- Species: C. sugillatus

Binomial name
- Conus sugillatus Reeve, 1844

Synonyms
- Conus (Lividoconus) sugillatus Reeve, 1844; Lividoconus sugillatus (Reeve, 1844)

Species of gastropod

Conus sugillatus is a species of sea snail, a marine gastropod mollusk, in the family Conidae, the cone snails and their allies.

== Description ==
Shell size 35 mm.

== Distribution ==
This species occurs in the Mascarene Basin. and the Philippines.
