= Miarinarivo II =

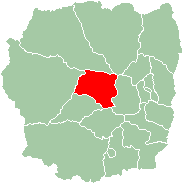
- Miarinarivo

- Location in Madagascar
- Coordinates: 18°57′39″S 46°54′00″E
- Country: Madagascar
- Region: Itasy
- District: Miarinarivo

Population (2018)
  - Ethnicities: Merina
- Time zone: UTC3 (EAT)
- Postal code: 117

Miarinarivo II is a rural municipality in Itasy Region, in the Central Highlands of Madagascar. It covers the villages around the city of Miarinarivo.

Miarinarivo is located at 100 km (62 mi) of Antananarivo and includes the fokontany (villages) of: Ambalalava, Amboalefoka, Ampasamanantongotra, Antanety, Antsahamaina, Antsampanimahazo, Igararana, Manankasina, Miadana and Moraranokely.

== Religion ==
- FJKM – Fiangonan'i Jesoa Kristy eto Madagasikara (Church of Jesus Christ in Madagascar)
- FLM – Fiangonana Loterana Malagasy (Malagasy Lutheran Church)
