= Morarano Marotampona =

Morarano Marotampona Maritampona
- Location in Madagascar
- Coordinates: 18°47′S 46°36′E
- Country: Madagascar
- Region: Bongolava
- District: Fenoarivobe
- Elevation: 1,003 m (3,291 ft)

Population (2001)
  - Total: 11,000
- Time zone: UTC3 (EAT)

Morarano Marotampona (other name: Maritampona) is a town and commune in Madagascar. It belongs to the district of Fenoarivobe, which is a part of Bongolava Region. The population of the commune was estimated to be approximately 11,000 in 2001 commune census.

Only primary schooling is available. The majority 95% of the population of the commune are farmers. The most important crop is rice, while other important products are maize and cassava. Services provide employment for 5% of the population.

The commune has 16 fokontany (villages).
