= Ambohitromby, Fenoarivobe =

- Location in Madagascar
- Coordinates: 18°58′S 46°19′E
- Country: Madagascar
- Region: Bongolava
- District: Fenoarivobe
- Elevation: 837 m (2,746 ft)

Population (2018)
  - Total: 21,466
- Time zone: UTC3 (EAT)

Ambohitromby, Fenoarivobe is a town and commune in Madagascar. It belongs to the district of Fenoarivobe, which is a part of Bongolava Region. The population of the commune was estimated to be approximately 21,466 in 2018.
