= Bemahatazana =

- Location in Madagascar
- Coordinates: 19°21′S 46°0′E
- Country: Madagascar
- Region: Bongolava
- District: Tsiroanomandidy
- Elevation: 678 m (2,224 ft)

Population (2001)
  - Total: 18,000
- Time zone: UTC3 (EAT)

Bemahatazana is a town and commune in Madagascar. It belongs to the district of Tsiroanomandidy, which is a part of Bongolava Region. The population of the commune was estimated to be approximately 18,000 in 2001 commune census.

Only primary schooling is available. The majority 95% of the population of the commune are farmers. The most important crop is rice, while other important products are maize and cassava. Services provide employment for 5% of the population.
