= Mascarene Basin =

Basin of the Indian Ocean

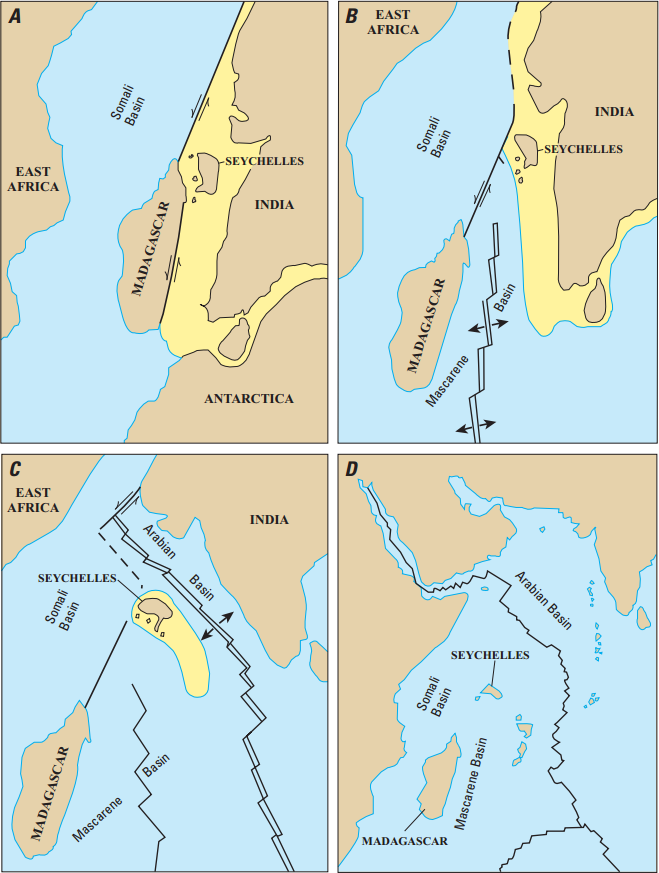
Creation of the Mascarene Basin following the break-up of Gondwanaland

The Mascarene Basin is an oceanic basin in the western Indian Ocean. It was formed as the tectonic plate of the Indian subcontinent pulled away from the Madagascar Plate about 66–90 Mya, following the breaking up of the Gondwana supercontinent.

The Mascarene Basin is bounded on the west by the island of Madagascar, i.e. the Precambrian Madagascar Massif. It is separated from the Western and Eastern Somali Basins to the north and northeast by the island arc from the northern tip of Madagascar, the Farquhar Islands, the Amirante Islands and Amirante Plateau, the Seychelles Plateau and the Mascarene Plateau. To the southwest and south it is separated from the Madagascar Basin by a continuation of the island arc through Mauritius Island and Reunion Island, the Mauritius Fracture Zone, a fracture zone trending approximately NE-SW, located east of Mauritius Island, and the northwestern edge of the Madagascar Ridge.

The approximate center of the basin is 15°S 56°E.

== See also ==
- Geology of Madagascar
