= Mahasolo =

- Location in Madagascar
- Coordinates: 19°7′15″S 46°21′56″E
- Country: Madagascar
- Region: Bongolava
- District: Tsiroanomandidy
- Elevation: 861 m (2,825 ft)

Population (2018)
  - Total: 35,152
- Time zone: UTC3 (EAT)

Mahasolo is a town and commune in Madagascar. It belongs to the district of Tsiroanomandidy, which is a part of Bongolava Region. The population of the commune was estimated to be approximately 35,152 in 2018.

In addition to primary schooling, the town offers secondary education at both junior and senior levels. The majority 80% of the population of the commune are farmers, while an additional 18% receive their livelihood from raising livestock. The most important crops are rice and maize; ⁣⁣cassava⁣⁣ is also an important agricultural product. Services provide employment for 2% of the population.

== Rivers ==
This commune is bordered by the Sakay river.
