= Sarobaratra Ifanja =

- Location in Madagascar
- Coordinates: 18°48′S 46°44′E
- Country: Madagascar
- Region: Itasy
- District: Miarinarivo
- Elevation: 1,222 m (4,009 ft)

Population (2001)
  - Total: 19,000
  - Ethnicities: Merina
- Time zone: UTC3 (EAT)

Sarobaratra Ifanja is a town and commune in Madagascar. It belongs to the district of Miarinarivo, which is a part of Itasy Region. The population of the commune was estimated to be approximately 19,000 in the 2001 commune census.

Primary and junior level secondary education are available in town. 98% of the population of the commune are farmers. The most important crop is rice, while other important products are maize and cassava. Services provide employment for 2% of the population.
