= Ambatolampy, Tsiroanomandidy =

Ambatolampy
- Location in Madagascar
- Coordinates: 18°54′S 46°7′E
- Country: Madagascar
- Region: Bongolava
- District: Tsiroanomandidy
- Elevation: 810 m (2,660 ft)

Population (2001)
  - Total: 13,000
- Time zone: UTC3 (EAT)

Ambatolampy is a town and commune in Madagascar. It belongs to the district of Tsiroanomandidy, which is a part of Bongolava Region. The population of the commune was estimated to be approximately 13,000 in 2001 commune census.

Only primary schooling is available. The majority 60% of the population of the commune are farmers, while an additional 39% receives their livelihood from raising livestock. The most important crop is rice, while other important products are maize and cassava. Services provide employment for 1% of the population.
