= Miandanarivo =

- Location in Madagascar
- Coordinates: 18°55′S 45°56′E
- Country: Madagascar
- Region: Bongolava
- District: Tsiroanomandidy
- Elevation: 800 m (2,600 ft)

Population (2001)
  - Total: 11,000
- Time zone: UTC3 (EAT)

Miandanarivo is a town and commune in Madagascar. It belongs to the district of Tsiroanomandidy, which is a part of Bongolava Region. The population of the commune was estimated to be approximately 11,000 in 2001 commune census.

Only primary schooling is available. The majority 98% of the population of the commune are farmers. The most important crop is rice, while other important products are maize and cassava. Services provide employment for 2% of the population.
