= Soanierana, Tsiroanomandidy =

Coordinates: 20.629°S 47.345°E

Soanierana
- Interactive map of Soanierana
- Country: Madagascar
- Region: Bongolava
- District: Tsiroanomandidy

Population (2001)
  - Total: 7,000
- Time zone: UTC3 (EAT)
- Postal code: 119

Soanierana is a rural municipality in Madagascar. It belongs to the district of Tsiroanomandidy, which is a part of Bongolava region. The population of the commune was estimated to be approximately 7,000 in 2001 commune census.

Only primary schooling is available. The majority 94% of the population of the commune are farmers, while an additional 5% receives their livelihood from raising livestock. The most important crop is rice, while other important products are maize and cassava. Services provide employment for 1% of the population.
