= Rayan Raveloson =

Malagasy footballer (born 1997)

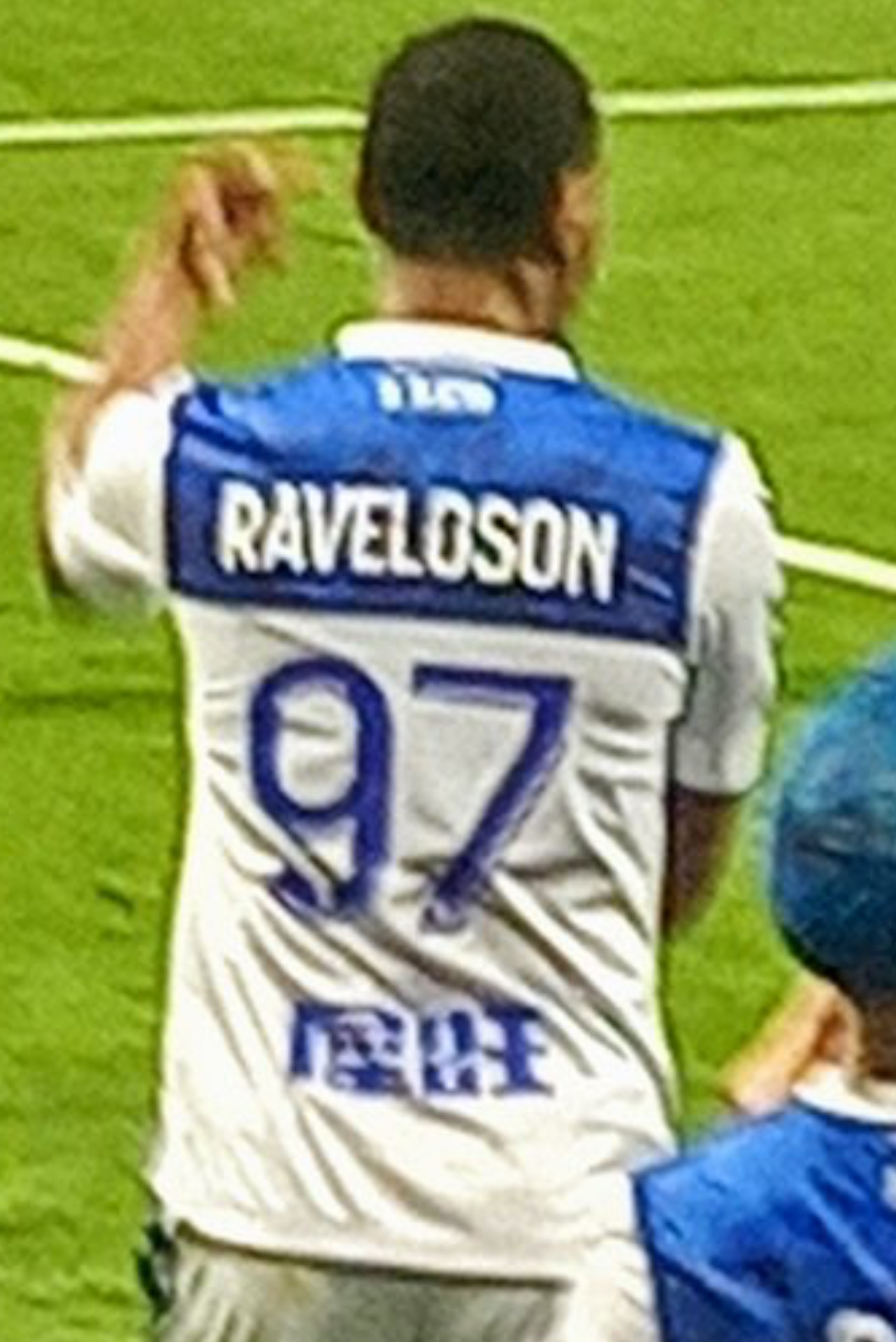
- Raveloson in 2024

Personal information
- Full name: Rayan Ny Aina Arnaldo Raveloson
- Date of birth: 16 January 1997 (age 29)
- Place of birth: Anosibe Ifanja, Madagascar
- Height: 1.82 m (6 ft 0 in)
- Position: Midfielder

Team information
- Current team: Amedspor

Youth career
- SS Jeanne d'Arc

Senior career*
Years	Team	Apps	(Gls)
2014–2018	Tours B	38	(2)
2014–2018	Tours	53	(2)
2018–2021	Troyes	87	(6)
2019	Troyes II	1	(0)
2021–2022	LA Galaxy	44	(8)
2022–2025	Auxerre	81	(7)
2025–2026	Young Boys	42	(2)
2026–	Amedspor	0	(0)

International career^{‡}
2019–	Madagascar	45	(8)
- * Club domestic league appearances and goals as of 17 May 2026 ‡ National team caps and goals as of 12 October 2025

Rayan Ny Aina Arnaldo Raveloson (Malagasy: [ˈrajan raˈvelʷsun]; born 16 January 1997) is a Malagasy professional footballer who plays as a midfielder for Turkish Süper Lig club Amedspor. He also holds French nationality as he was raised in Réunion, where his mother is from.

== Youth career ==
Raveloson is a product of Réunionnais club SS Jeanne d'Arc.

== Club career ==
=== Tours ===
Raveloson started his career at French club Tours FC. He spent time with both the first team and the reserve team.

=== Troyes ===
In 2018, Raveloson signed for French Club ES Troyes AC. He helped them win promotion to Ligue 1 in the 2020/2021 season.

=== LA Galaxy ===
On 20 May 2021, Raveloson signed with Major League Soccer side LA Galaxy. He won an MLS Goal of the Week award in his first season for his bicycle kick goal against the Portland Timbers.

=== Auxerre ===
On 4 August 2022, LA Galaxy announced that it had transferred Raveloson to newly promoted Ligue 1 side Auxerre for a reported fee of $1.78 million, with potential add-ons to boost it above two million.

=== Young Boys ===
On 18 January 2025, Raveloson signed a three-and-a-half-year contract with Young Boys in Switzerland.

=== Amedspor ===
On 29 June 2026, Raveloson signed with Amedspor, making their debut in the Turkish top tier, for two seasons with an option for third.

== International career ==
Raveloson made his Madagascar national team debut on 2 June 2019, in a friendly against Luxembourg, as a half-time substitute for Faneva Imà Andriatsima. He played at 2019 Africa Cup of Nations when Madagascar made a sensational run to the quarterfinals.

== Career statistics ==
=== Club ===
As of matches played 15 March 2026

Appearances and goals by club, season and competition
Club	Season	League			National cup		League cup		Europe		Total	
Club	Season	Division	Apps	Goals	Apps	Goals	Apps	Goals	Apps	Goals	Apps	Goals
Tours B	2014–15	Championnat National 3 (Note: "Championnat de France Amateur 2" until 2017)	22	2	–		–		–		22	2
Tours B	2015–16	Championnat National 3	8	0	–		—		–		8	0
Tours B	2016–17	Championnat National 3	4	0	–		–		–		4	0
Tours B	2017–18	Championnat National 3	4	0	–		–		–		4	0
Tours B	Total		38	2	0	0	0	0	–		0	0
Tours	2014–15	Ligue 2	1	0	–		–		–		1	0
Tours	2015–16	Ligue 2	7	0	1	0	—		–		8	0
Tours	2016–17	Ligue 2	19	1	0	0	1	0	–		20	1
Tours	2017–18	Ligue 2	26	1	3	0	4	1	–		33	2
Tours	Total		53	2	4	0	5	1	–		62	3
Troyes	2018–19	Ligue 2	29	4	0	0	3	1	–		32	5
Troyes	2019–20	Ligue 2	23	0	0	0	0	0	–		23	0
Troyes	2020–21	Ligue 2	35	2	—		—		–		35	2
Troyes	Total		87	6	0	0	3	1	–		90	7
Troyes B	2018–19	Championnat National 3	1	0	—		—		–		1	0
LA Galaxy	2021	MLS	22	5	—		—		–		22	5
LA Galaxy	2022	MLS	22	3	4	0	—		–		26	3
LA Galaxy	Total		44	8	4	0	—		–		48	8
Auxerre	2022–23	Ligue 1	34	2	3	2	—		–		37	4
Auxerre	2023–24	Ligue 2	34	4	1	0	—		–		35	4
Auxerre	2024–25	Ligue 1	13	1	1	0	—		–		14	1
Auxerre	Total		81	7	5	2	—		–		86	9
Young Boys	2024–25	Swiss Super League	19	2	2	0	—		0	0	21	2
Young Boys	2025–26	Swiss Super League	23	0	2	0	—		9 (Note: Appearances in UEFA Europa League)	1	34	1
Young Boys	Total		42	2	4	0	—		9	1	55	3
Career total			346	27	17	2	8	2	9	1	380	32

=== International ===
As of match played 12 October 2025

Appearances and goals by national team and year
National team	Year	Apps	Goals
Madagascar	2019	8	2
Madagascar	2020	3	0
Madagascar	2021	7	0
Madagascar	2022	4	1
Madagascar	2023	7	0
Madagascar	2024	10	2
Madagascar	2025	8	3
Madagascar	2026	3	1
Total		50	9

Scores and results list Madagascar's goal tally first, score column indicates score after each Raveloson goal.

List of international goals scored by Rayan Raveloson
No.	Date	Venue	Opponent	Score	Result	Competition
1	14 June 2019	Annexe de Grand Stade Marrakech, Marrakesh, Morocco	Mauritania	1–0	1–3	Friendly
2	16 November 2019	Mahamasina Municipal Stadium, Antananarivo, Madagascar	Ethiopia	1–0	1–0	2021 Africa Cup of Nations qualification
3	27 September 2022	El Bachir Stadium, Mohammedia, Morocco	Benin	1–3	1–3	Friendly
4	7 June 2024	FNB Stadium, Johannesburg, South Africa	Comoros	1–0	2–1	2026 FIFA World Cup qualification
5	7 June 2024	FNB Stadium, Johannesburg, South Africa	Comoros	2–0	2–1	2026 FIFA World Cup qualification
6	19 March 2025	Larbi Zaouli Stadium, Casablanca, Morocco	Central African Republic	1–1	4–1	2026 FIFA World Cup qualification
7	19 March 2025	Larbi Zaouli Stadium, Casablanca, Morocco	Central African Republic	2–1	4–1	2026 FIFA World Cup qualification
8	8 September 2025	Larbi Zaouli Stadium, Casablanca, Morocco	Chad	2–1	3–1	2026 FIFA World Cup qualification
9	31 March 2026	Emirhan Sport Complex, Antalya, Türkiye	Equatorial Guinea	1–1	1–1	Friendly

== Honours ==
Troyes

- Ligue 2: 2020–21

Auxerre

- Ligue 2: 2023–24

Individual

- Best XI (Match Day 26): Ligue 2 Domino's 2020

Orders

- Knight Order of Madagascar: 2019
