= Tsinjoarivo =

- Location in Madagascar
- Coordinates: 18°56′S 46°19′E
- Country: Madagascar
- Region: Bongolava
- District: Fenoarivobe
- Elevation: 861 m (2,825 ft)

Population (2018)
  - Total: 27,934
- Time zone: UTC3 (EAT)
- Postal code: 115

Tsinjoarivo is a town and commune in Madagascar. It belongs to the district of Fenoarivobe, which is a part of Bongolava Region. The population of the commune was estimated to be approximately 27,934 in 2018.

Primary and junior level secondary education are available in town. The majority 95% of the population of the commune are farmers. The most important crop is rice, while other important products are maize and cassava. Services provide employment for 5% of the population.

== Roads ==
Tsinjoarivo lies on the National road 1b
