= Anosy, Tsiroanomandidy =

Anosy
- Location in Madagascar
- Coordinates: 18°44′S 46°25′E
- Country: Madagascar
- Region: Bongolava
- District: Tsiroanomandidy
- Elevation: 1,003 m (3,291 ft)

Population (2001)
  - Total: 9,000
- Time zone: UTC3 (EAT)

Anosy is a town and commune in Madagascar. It belongs to the district of Tsiroanomandidy, which is a part of Bongolava Region. The population of the commune was estimated to be approximately 9,000 in 2001 commune census.

Primary and junior level secondary education are available in town. The majority 80% of the population of the commune are farmers, while an additional 19% receives their livelihood from raising livestock. The most important crop is rice, while other important products are maize and cassava. Services provide employment for 1% of the population.
