= Route nationale 1 (Madagascar) =

Road in Madagascar

Location
- Country: Madagascar

Highway system
- Roads in Madagascar

Route nationale 1 (RN 1) is a primary highway in Madagascar of 234 km, running from Analavory, Miarinarivo to Tsiroanomandidy. It crosses the region of Bongolava and Analamanga.

In 1983, Irish author Dervla Murphy described the condition of the road at the time:

We planned to turn off Route Nationale No. 1 fifteen miles west of Tana, at Arivonimamo, where a dirt road leads into the Ankarata range. This brief Route Nationale (it ends abruptly at Tsiroanomandidy) has an astonishing velvet-smooth tarmac surface; we were to see nothing else like it in Madagascar.

== Selected locations on route ==
(east to west)

- Antananarivo
- Analavory - (intersection with RN 1b and RN 43)
- Miarinarivo
- Tsiroanomandidy - (intersection with RN 1a to Maintirano and RN 1b)
- Belobaka

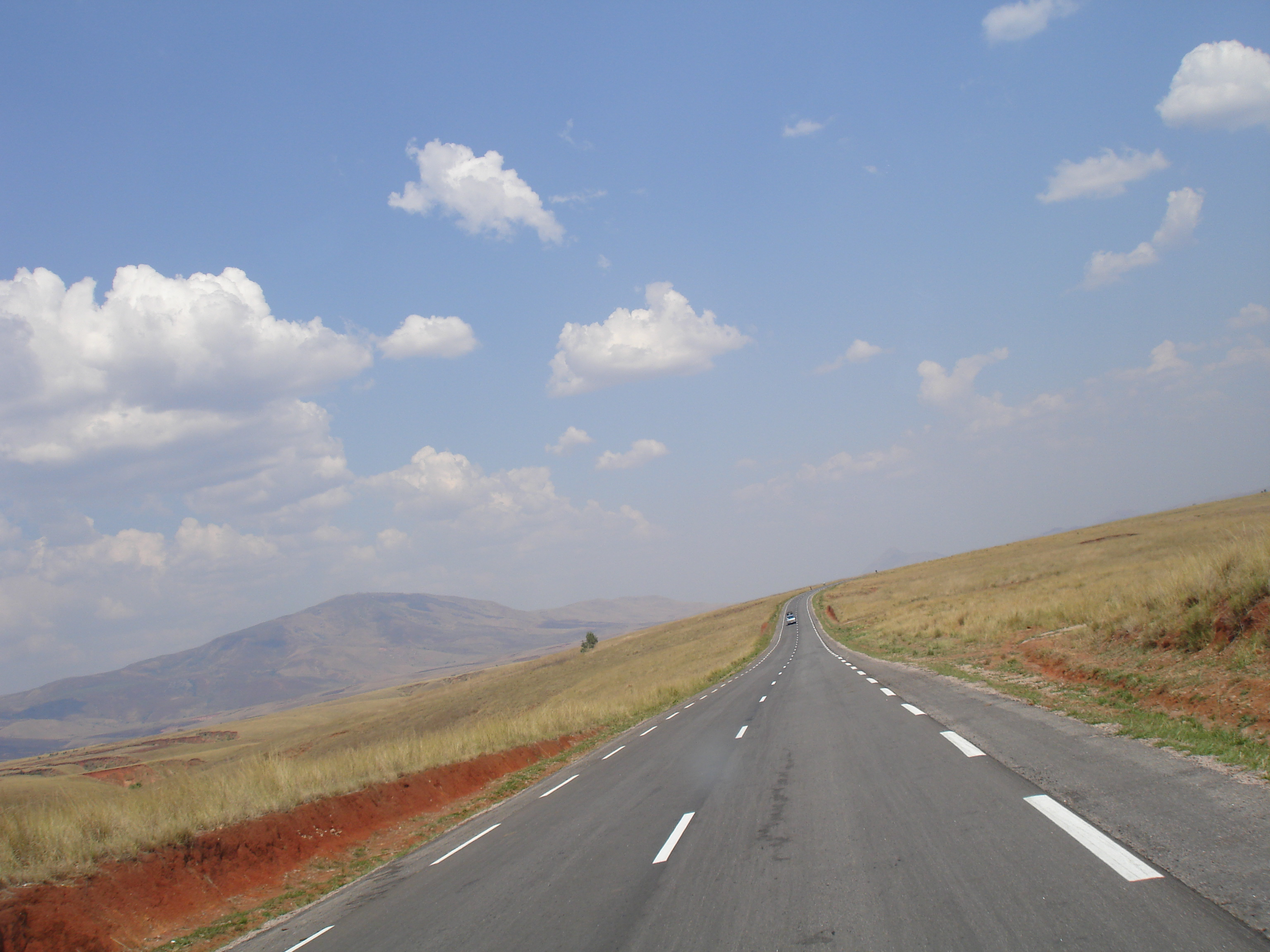
MADAGASCAR BONGOLAVA (4)

== See also ==
- List of roads in Madagascar
- Transport in Madagascar
