= Fenoarivo-Afovoany District =

Fenoarivo-Afovoany
- District
- Location within Madagascar
- Coordinates: 18°26′59″S 46°33′42″E
- Country: Madagascar
- Region: Bongolava

Area
  - Total: 2,990 sq mi (7,745 km^{2})

Population (2018)pnae.mg
  - Total: 181,284

Fenoarivo Afovoany is a district of Bongolava in Madagascar.

== Communes ==
The district is further divided into eight communes; which are further sub-divided into 101 fokontany:

- Ambatomainty Atsimo
- Ambohitromby
- Fenoarivobe (also called: Fenoarivo-Afovoany)
- Firavahana
- Kiranomena
- Mahajeby
- Morarano Marotampona
- Tsinjoarivo
