= List of regions of Madagascar by Human Development Index =

This is a list of the 22 regions of Madagascar (since 2009) by Human Development Index as of 2022.

Rank	Province	HDI (2022)
Medium human development
1	Analamanga	0.586
2	Diana	0.553
Low human development
3	Sava	0.509
4	Alaotra-Mangoro	0.507
5	Analanjirofo	0.505
6	Boeny	0.500
7	Haute Matsiatra	0.497
8	Atsinanana	0.497
9	Itasy	0.488
–	Madagascar (average)	0.487
10	Vakinankaratra	0.487
11	Amoron'i Mania	0.475
12	Sofia	0.467
13	Bongolava	0.459
14	Ihorombe	0.450
15	Atsimo-Andrefana	0.445
16	Vatovavy-Fitovinany	0.439
17	Melaky	0.431
18	Betsiboka	0.425
19	Androy	0.412
20	Atsimo-Atsinanana	0.410
21	Anosy	0.382
22	Menabe	0.382

== See also ==
- List of countries by Human Development Index
