= Fierenana, Tsiroanomandidy =

- Location in Madagascar
- Coordinates: 18°33′S 45°51′E
- Country: Madagascar
- Region: Bongolava
- District: Tsiroanomandidy
- Elevation: 910 m (2,990 ft)

Population (2018)
  - Total: 21,224
- Time zone: UTC3 (EAT)

Fierenana, Tsiroanomandidy is a town and commune in Madagascar. It belongs to the district of Tsiroanomandidy, which is a part of Bongolava Region. The population of the commune was estimated to be approximately 21,224 in 2018.
