= Mount Septimus =

Mountain in the country of Canada

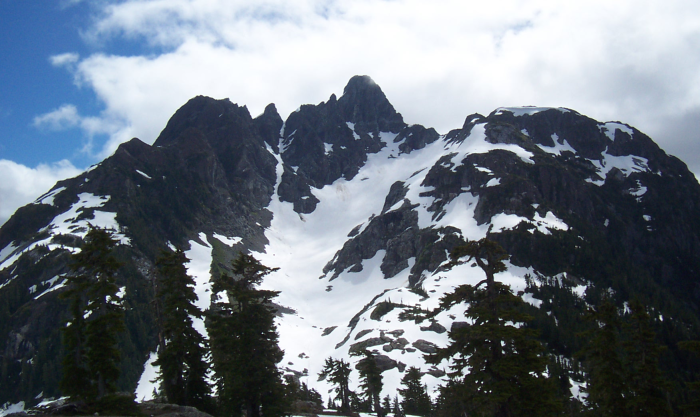

Highest point
- Elevation: 1,948 m (6,391 ft)
- Prominence: 68 m (223 ft)
- Coordinates: 49°28′50.0″N 125°30′49.0″W

Geography
- Location within Vancouver Island Location within British Columbia
- Interactive map of Mount Septimus
- Location: Vancouver Island, British Columbia, Canada
- District: Clayoquot Land District
- Parent range: Vancouver Island Ranges
- Topo map: NTS 92F5 Bedwell River

Mount Septimus is the western summit of a jagged mountain on Vancouver Island, British Columbia, Canada, located 50 km (31 mi) southeast of Gold River and 10 km (6 mi) south of Buttle Lake. It contains a huge glacier on the north flank. The highest peak on the massif is Mount Rosseau, located 600 m (1,969 ft) to the west.

== History ==
There are a couple of possibilities of the source of Mount Septimus' name recorded in the BC Geographical Names Information System:

"By some, thought to be descriptive – Septimus being a mountain of seven peaks." (List of Place Names in Strathcona Park, compiled by Allan C. Brooks, and reprinted in "Natural & Human History Themes, Strathcona Provincial Park" a special report produced by Betty Brooks for BC Parks Branch, 1989.) Source: BC place name cards, or correspondence to/from BC's Chief Geographer or BC Geographical Names Office

"Possibly named after Septimus Evans, surgeon aboard S.S. Beaver." [note that this assumption is likely made because of the mountain's proximity to Price Creek and a mistaken assumption that Price Creek was named for Capt John Price, HMS Scout, under whom Septimus Evans was surgeon before joining the hired vessel Beaver under Captain Pender, 1868.] Source: Canadian Geographical Names Database, Ottawa

== Access ==
Mount Septimus has four established access routes:

1. Bedwell Lake Trail, then traverse East to Cream Lake. Accesses west aspect. Quickest & easiest approach.
2. Price Creek Trail to Cream Lake. Accesses west aspect. The Price Creek Trail is not maintained and is overgrown.
3. Della Falls Trail to Love Lake. From Love Lake, bushwack west up to a ridge, then head north on the ridge to the mountains flanks. Accesses south aspect.
4. Flower Ridge Trail to Price Pass. Scramble off of Flower Ridge to the pass between Green and Margret Lakes. Route finding difficulties from the pass onto the mountains flanks. Accesses north aspect.

Note: From Cream Lake, the south aspect can be accessed by ascending the wide couloir to the shoulder west of Mount Septimus' summit.

== See also ==
- List of mountains in Strathcona Provincial Park
