= Maroharana =

- Location in Madagascar
- Coordinates: 19°17′S 46°10′E
- Country: Madagascar
- Region: Bongolava
- District: Tsiroanomandidy
- Elevation: 745 m (2,444 ft)

Population (2001)
  - Total: 5,000
- Time zone: UTC3 (EAT)

Maroharana is a town and commune in Madagascar. It belongs to the district of Tsiroanomandidy, which is a part of Bongolava Region. The population of the commune was estimated to be approximately 5,000 in 2001 commune census.

Only primary schooling is available. It is also a site of industrial-scale mining. The majority 95% of the population of the commune are farmers, while an additional 5% receives their livelihood from raising livestock. The most important crop is rice, while other important products are maize and cassava.
