= Joseph Ravoahangy Andrianavalona Hospital =

Hôpital Joseph Ravoahangy Andrianavalona

Geography
- Location: Antananarivo, Madagascar
- Coordinates: 18°55′10″S 47°31′06″E

Organisation
- Type: General

Services
- Beds: 621

History
- Founded: 1965

Links
- Lists: Hospitals in Madagascar

Joseph Ravoahangy Andrianavalona Hospital (French: Centre Hospitalier Universitaire Joseph Ravoahangy Andrianavalona) (CHUJRA) is the largest hospital in Madagascar. Located in the Ampefiloha area of Antananarivo and founded in 1965, it is named for Joseph Ravoahangy Andrianavalona (28 October 1893 - 21 August 1970), a Malagasy physician and politician. The hospital was featured on a Malagasy postage stamp in 1972.
