= Ankerana Avaratra =

- Location in Madagascar
- Coordinates: 18°35′S 46°7′E
- Country: Madagascar
- Region: Bongolava
- District: Tsiroanomandidy
- Elevation: 858 m (2,815 ft)

Population (2001)
  - Total: 8,000
- Time zone: UTC3 (EAT)

Ankerana Avaratra is a town and commune in Madagascar. It belongs to the district of Tsiroanomandidy, which is a part of Bongolava Region. The population of the commune was estimated to be approximately 8,000 in 2001 commune census.

Only primary schooling is available. The majority 95% of the population of the commune are farmers, while an additional 3% receives their livelihood from raising livestock. The most important crop is rice, while other important products are maize and cassava. Services provide employment for 2% of the population.
