= Firavahana =

- Location in Madagascar
- Coordinates: 18°38′S 46°52′E
- Country: Madagascar
- Region: Bongolava
- District: Fenoarivobe
- Elevation: 1,335 m (4,380 ft)

Population (2001)
  - Total: 35,000
- Time zone: UTC3 (EAT)

Firavahana is a town and commune in Madagascar. It belongs to the district of Fenoarivobe, which is a part of Bongolava Region. The population of the commune was estimated to be approximately 35,000 in 2001 commune census.

Primary and junior level secondary education are available in town. The majority 90% of the population of the commune are farmers. The most important crop is rice, while other important products are cassava and tomato. Services provide employment for 10% of the population.

== Mining ==
Discoverys of gold deposits in 2013 have attracted 4,000-10,000 miners to the region of Firavahana.

== Sports ==
Football:

- FC ROI Firavahana Bongolava
