= Anosibe Ifanja =

- Location in Madagascar
- Coordinates: 18°52′S 46°45′E
- Country: Madagascar
- Region: Itasy
- District: Miarinarivo
- Elevation: 1,082 m (3,550 ft)

Population (2001)
  - Total: 17,000
  - Ethnicities: Merina
- Time zone: UTC3 (EAT)

Anosibe Ifanja is a town and commune in Madagascar. It belongs to the district of Miarinarivo, which is a part of Itasy Region.

== Population ==
The population of the commune was estimated to be approximately 17,000 in 2001 commune census.

== Education ==
Primary and junior level secondary education are available in town.

== Employment and economy ==
The majority 95% of the population of the commune are farmers. The most important crop is rice, while other important products are maize and cassava. Services provide employment for 5% of the population.

== Personalities ==
- Rayan Raveloson - Madagascar Soccer National Team
