= Ambalanirana =

- Location in Madagascar
- Coordinates: 18°45′S 46°30′E
- Country: Madagascar
- Region: Bongolava
- District: Tsiroanomandidy
- Elevation: 990 m (3,250 ft)

Population (2001)
  - Total: 19,000
- Time zone: UTC3 (EAT)
- Climate: Cwa

Ambalanirana is a town and commune in Madagascar. It belongs to the district of Tsiroanomandidy, which is a part of Bongolava Region. The population of the commune was estimated to be approximately 19,000 in 2001 commune census.

Primary and junior level secondary education are available in town. The majority (60%) of the population of the commune are farmers, while an additional 37% receive their livelihood from raising livestock. The most important crop is rice, while other important products are sugarcane, maize and cassava. Services provide employment for 1% of the population. Additionally fishing employs 2% of the population.
