= Massif =

Principal mass of a mountain

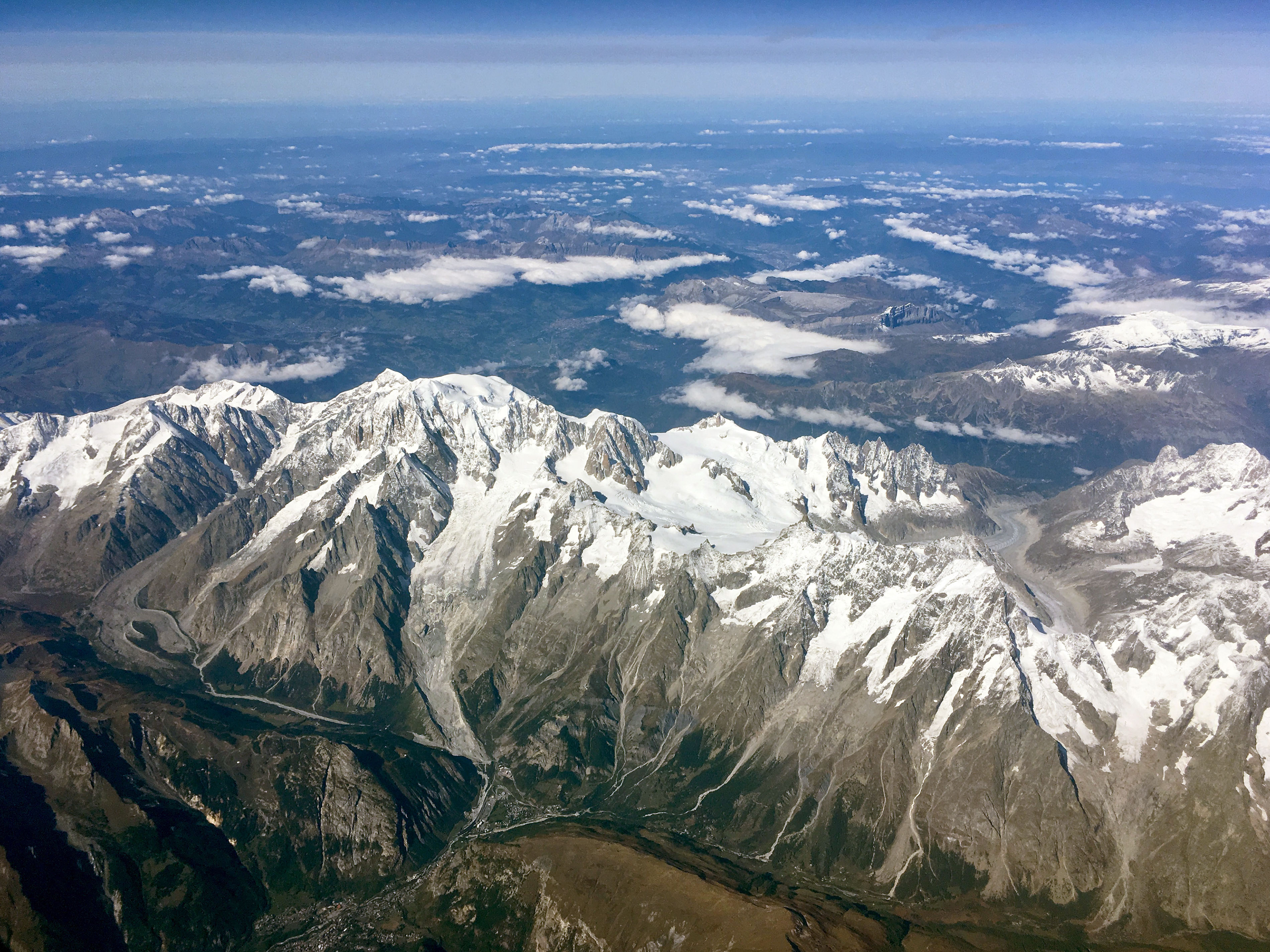
Aerial view of Mont Blanc massif, an example of a massif and also the highest summit in the Alps

A massif (/mæˈsiːf, ˈmæsɪf/) is a principal mountain mass, such as a compact portion of a mountain range, containing one or more summits (e.g. France's Massif Central). In mountaineering literature, massif is frequently used to denote the main mass of an individual mountain.

As a purely scientific term in geology, however, a "massif" is separately and more specifically defined as a section of a planet's crust that is demarcated by faults or flexures. In the movement of the crust, a massif tends to retain its internal structure while being displaced as a whole. A massif is a smaller structural unit than a tectonic plate and is considered the fourth-largest driving force in geomorphology.

The word "massif" originates from French (in which the word also means "massive"), where it is used to refer to a large mountain mass or compact group of connected mountains forming an independent portion of a range. The Face on Mars is an example of an extraterrestrial massif. Massifs may also form underwater, as with the Atlantis Massif.

== List ==
=== Africa ===
- Adrar des Ifoghas – Mali
- Aïr Massif – Niger
- Ambohiby Massif – Madagascar
- Benna Massif – Guinea
- Bongo Massif – Central African Republic
- Ennedi Plateau – Chad
- Kilimanjaro Massif – Kenya–Tanzania
- Oban Massif – Nigeria
- Marojejy Massif – Madagascar
- Mulanje Massif – Malawi
- Virunga Massif – Uganda–Rwanda–DR Congo
- Waterberg Biosphere – South Africa

==== Algeria ====
- Collo Massif
- Edough Massif
- Khachna Massif

=== Antarctica ===
- Borg Massif
- Craddock Massif
- Cumpston Massif
- Vinson Massif
- Otway Massif

=== Asia ===
- Annapurna – Nepal
- Bromo-Tengger-Semeru – Indonesia
- Chu Pong Massif – Vietnam
- Dhaulagiri – Nepal
- Gasherbrum – China-Pakistan
- Kangchenjunga – Nepal–India
- Knuckles Massif – Sri Lanka
- Kondyor Massif – Russia
- Kugitangtau Ridge – Turkmenistan
- Kumgangsan – North Korea
- Logar ultrabasite massif – Afghanistan
- Mount Ararat – Turkey
- Mount Everest massif (including Lhotse) – Nepal–Tibet (China)
- Mount Kinabalu – Malaysia
- Mount Tomuraushi – Japan
- Nanga Parbat – Pakistan

==== India ====
- Bundelkhand
- Nun Kun
- Panchchuli

==== Iran ====
- Dena
- Hazaran
- Kheru-Naru (Chekel)
- Kholeno
- Mount Damavand
- Sabalan
- Takht-e Suleyman Massif
- Zard-Kuh

==== Kazakhstan ====
- Degelen
- Kokshetau Massif
- Mount Ku
- Myrzhyk
- Semizbughy

=== Europe ===
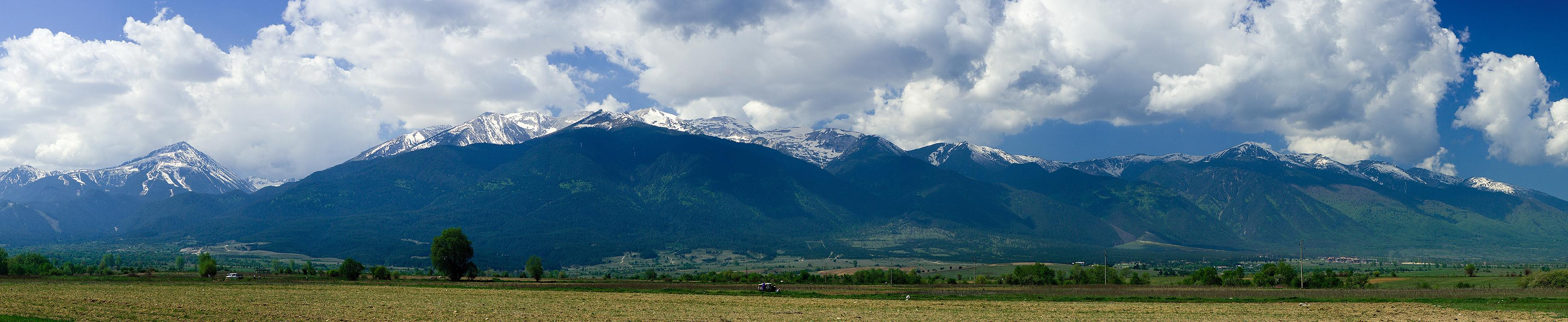
Panorama of Pirin Mountain massif, Bulgaria

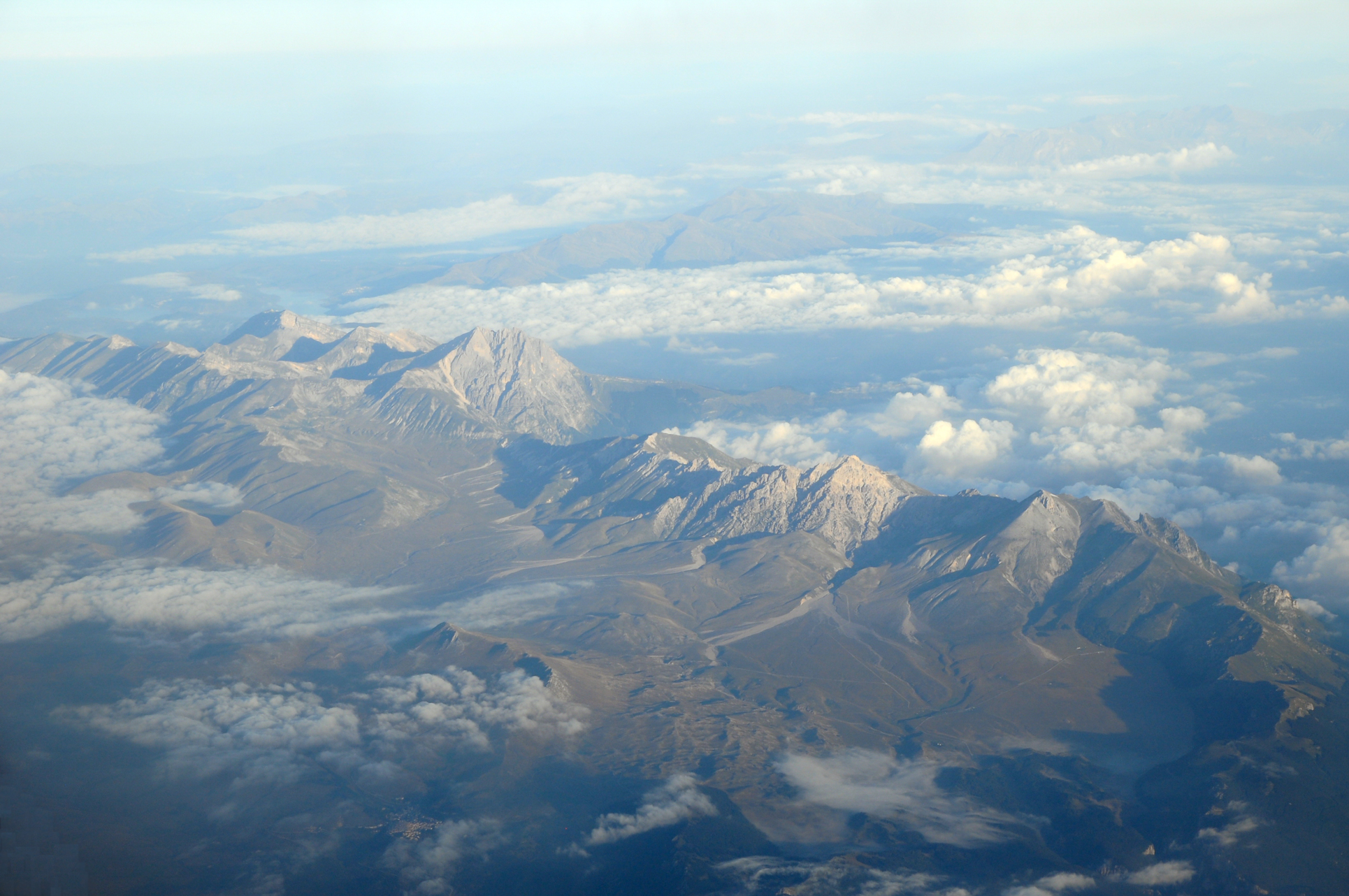
Gran Sasso d'Italia massif seen from an airplane. Part of the Apennine Mountains, it is located in the Abruzzo region of Italy.

- Aarmassif – Switzerland
- Ardennes Massif – France–Belgium–Luxembourg
- Åreskutan – Sweden
- Arlberg – Austria
- Bohemian Massif – Czech Republic
- Ceahlău Massif – Romania
- Gotthard Massif – Switzerland
- Hesperian Massif – Iberian Peninsula
- Jungfrau Massif – Switzerland
- Mangerton Mountain – Ireland
- Montgris – Spain
- Montserrat – Spain
- Mont Blanc massif – Italy–France–Switzerland
- Rhenish Massif – Germany, Belgium, Luxembourg and France
- Rila – Rhodope Massif – Bulgaria–Greece
- Troodos – Cyprus
- Untersberg – Germany–Austria
- Vitosha Massif – Bulgaria

==== France ====
- Alpilles
- Aravis Range
- Armorican Massif
- Bauges Massif
- Beaufortain Massif
- Belledonne massif
- Bornes Massif
- Calanques Massif
- Cerces Massif
- Chablais Massif
- Chartreuse Massif
- Dévoluy Mountains
- Massif des Écrins
- Jura Mountains
- Lauzière Massif
- Luberon
- Massif Central
- Massif de l'Esterel
- Massif du Mercantour-Argentera
- Monte Cinto Massif
- Taillefer Massif
- Queyras Massif
- Vanoise Massif
- Vercors Plateau
- Vosges Mountains

==== Italy ====
- Gran Sasso d'Italia
- Langkofel Group
- Grappa Massif
- Massiccio del Matese
- Massiccio del Pollino
- Monte Ermada
- Sila Massif
- Speikboden (South Tyrol)

==== United Kingdom ====
- Ben Nevis massif
- Cornubian Massif
- Long Mynd
- Snowdon Massif
- Ben Klibreck
- Cairngorms massifs
- Scafell massif

=== North America ===
==== Canada ====
- Laurentian Massif
- Le Massif de Charlevoix
- Mount Logan
- Mount Cayley
- Level Mountain
- Mount Edziza
- Mount Meager massif
- Mount Septimus

==== United States ====
- Adirondack Massif
- Denali
- Grandfather Mountain
- Mount Juneau
- Mount Katahdin
- Mount Le Conte
- Mount Shuksan
- Mount Timpanogos
- Shenandoah
- French Broad
- Teton Range

=== Oceania ===
- Big Ben – Heard Island
- Ahipara Gumfields – New Zealand

=== Caribbean ===
- Massif de la Hotte – Haiti
- Valle Nuevo Massif – Dominican Republic

=== Central America ===
- Cerro Chirripó – Costa Rica

=== South America ===
- Brasilia Massif – Brazil, Argentina, Paraguay, Uruguay.
- Neblina Massif – Venezuela–Brazil
- Colombian Massif – Colombia
- North Patagonian Massif – Argentina
- Deseado Massif – Argentina

=== Submerged ===
- Atlantis Massif – part of the Mid-Atlantic Ridge in the North Atlantic Ocean
- Tamu Massif — the largest volcano on Earth
