= Belobaka =

- Location in Madagascar
- Coordinates: 18°59′S 45°41′E
- Country: Madagascar
- Region: Bongolava
- District: Tsiroanomandidy
- Elevation: 806 m (2,644 ft)

Population (2001)
  - Total: 18,000
- Time zone: UTC3 (EAT)
- Postal code: 119

Belobaka is a rural municipality Madagascar. It belongs to the district of Tsiroanomandidy, which is a part of Bongolava Region. The population of the commune was estimated to be approximately 18,000 in 2001 commune census.

Primary and junior level secondary education are available in town. The majority 90% of the population of the commune are farmers. The most important crop is rice, while other important products are maize and cassava. Services provide employment for 10% of the population.

== Rivers ==
situation map of Belobaka

Belobaka lies at the Ifondry River
