= Route nationale 1b (Madagascar) =

Road in Madagascar

Route nationale 1 bis

Route information
- Length: 94 km (58 mi)

Major junctions
- From: Analavory
- To: Tsiroanomandidy

Location
- Country: Madagascar

Highway system
- Roads in Madagascar

Route nationale 1b (RN 1bis) is a secondary highway in Madagascar of 94 km, running from Analavory to Tsiroanomandidy. It crosses the region of Bongolava and Itasy.

== Selected locations on route ==
(east to west)

- Analavory - (intersection with RN 1 from Antananarivo)
- Ankadinondry Sakay (Babetville)
- Tsinjoarivo
- Tsiroanomandidy - (intersection with RN 1)

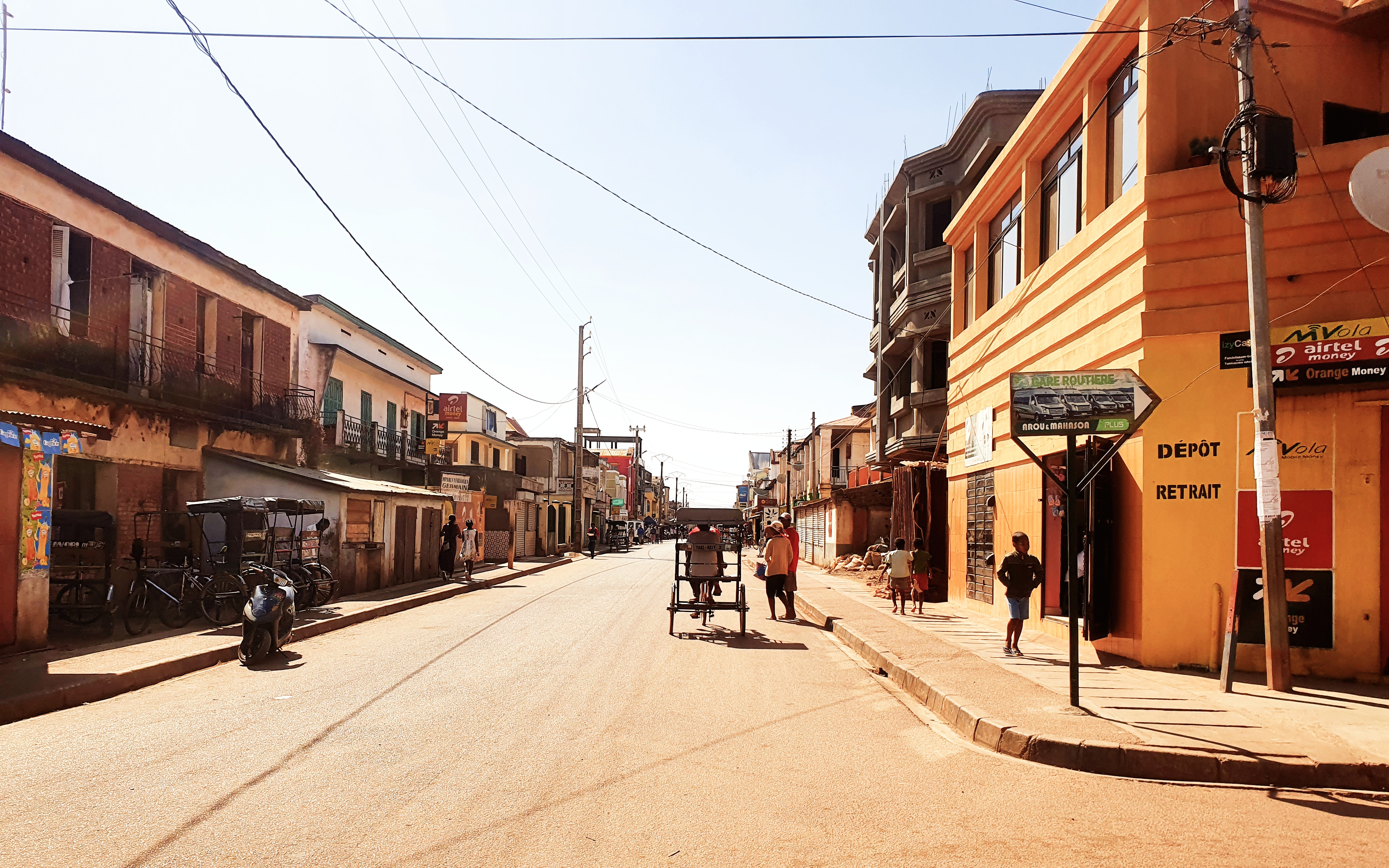
RN 1b at Tsiroanomandidy

== See also ==
- List of roads in Madagascar
- Transport in Madagascar
