= Fenoarivobe =

Fenoarivo-Afovoany
- District
- Location within Madagascar
- Coordinates: 18°26′59″S 46°33′42″E
- Country: Madagascar
- Region: Bongolava

Population (2018)
  - Total: 28,616

Fenoarivobe or Fenoarivo Afovoany or Fenoarivo Be is a town in central Madagascar in the region of Bongolava. It is the main city of the Fenoarivo-Afovoany district. It has a population of 28,616 after the 2018 census.

== Rivers ==
- Firavahana river
