= Soamahamanina =

- Location in Madagascar
- Coordinates: 18°59′S 47°1′E
- Country: Madagascar
- Region: Itasy
- District: Miarinarivo
- Elevation: 1,368 m (4,488 ft)

Population (2001)
  - Total: 9,000
  - Ethnicities: Merina
- Time zone: UTC3 (EAT)

Soamahamanina is a town and commune in Madagascar. It belongs to the district of Miarinarivo, which is a part of Itasy Region. The population of the commune was estimated to be approximately 9,000 in 2001 commune census.

Primary and junior level secondary education are available in town. The majority 98% of the population of the commune are farmers. The most important crop is rice, while other important products are pineapple, beans and cassava. Services provide employment for 2% of the population.
