= Tsiroanomandidy Airport =

- IATA: WTS; ICAO: FMMX

Summary
- Airport type: Public
- Operator: ADEMA (Aéroports de Madagascar)
- Serves: Tsiroanomandidy
- Location: Bongolava, Madagascar
- Elevation AMSL: 2,776 ft (846 m)
- Coordinates: 18°45′34″S 46°03′15″E

Map
- Location within Madagascar

Runways
Direction	Length		Surface
Direction	ft	m	Surface
04/22	3,527	1,075	laterite, grass

Tsiroanomandidy Airport is an airport in Tsiroanomandidy, Bongolava, Madagascar (IATA: WTS, ICAO: FMMX).
