= Zoma Bealoka =

- Location in Madagascar
- Coordinates: 18°51′S 47°3′E
- Country: Madagascar
- Region: Itasy
- District: Miarinarivo
- Elevation: 1,280 m (4,200 ft)

Population (2001)
  - Total: 10,000
  - Ethnicities: Merina
- Time zone: UTC3 (EAT)

Zoma Bealoka is a town and commune in Madagascar. It belongs to the district of Miarinarivo, which is a part of Itasy Region. The population of the commune was estimated to be approximately 10,000 in 2001 commune census.

The majority 95% of the population of the commune are farmers. The most important crop is rice, while other important products are maize and cassava. Services provide employment for 5% of the population.
