= Madagascar plate =

Tectonic plate formerly part of the supercontinent Gondwana

The Madagascar plate or Madagascar block is a tectonic plate holding the island of Madagascar. It was once attached to the Gondwana supercontinent and later the Indo-Australian plate.

Rifting in the Somali Basin began at the end of the Carboniferous 300 million years ago, as a part of the Karoo rift system. The initiation of the Gondwana breakup, and transform faulting along the Davie Fracture Zone, occurred in the Toarcian (about 182 million years ago) following the eruption of the Bouvet (Karoo) mantle plume. At this time, East Gondwana comprising the Antarctic, Madagascar, Indian, and Australian plates, began to separate from the African plate. East Gondwana then began to break apart about 115–120 million years ago when India began to move northward. Between 84 and 95 million years ago rifting separated Seychelles and India from Madagascar.

Since its formation, the Madagascar block has moved roughly in conjunction with Africa, and thus there are questions as to whether the Madagascar plate should be still considered a separate plate.

== Assembly of Gondwana ==
Madagascar was formerly located in the central part of the supercontinent Gondwana. It contains part of the East African Orogen, which formed in the Neoproterozoic to Cambrian assembly of the Gondwana. This heavily influenced the geology of central and northern Madagascar.

The entire island can be divided into four tectonic and geologic units: the Antongil block, the Antananarivo block, the Bekily Belt in the south, and the Bemarivo Belt in the far north.

- The Antongil Block is characterized by a 3.2 Ga gneiss intruded by granite that has undergone greenschist facies metamorphism.
- The Antananarivo Block contains 2.5 Ga gneiss layered with younger granitoids and gabbros. It has metamorphosed to granulite facies conditions.
- The Bemarivo Belt contains two regions, metasedimentary gneisses in the southern part and granitic domes in the north.
- The Bekily Belt is made up of mostly sedimentary protoliths and granulite and upper amphibolite grade gneisses.

The blocks in the northern part of the island are made up of Archean cratonic material. The Antongil block has been linked with the Dharwar Formation of India, however the Antananarivo block to the west has been too heavily altered to link easily to another continent.

The central part of the island contains metasediments from African and Indian continental shelves. This is the Itremo Group, which also contains intrusions of material from the Antongil block. The Itremo sheet was folded in the amalgamation of Madagascar ~700 Mya, and now contains upright folds, divergent reverse faults, and strike-slip faults.

== Rifting ==
The Madagascar plate experienced two major rifting events during the break-up of Gondwana. First, it separated from Africa about 160 Mya (million years ago), then from the Seychelles and India 66–90 Mya.

The first rifting event, separation from Somalia and the rest of Africa, caused displacement along the Davie Ridge, in the Mozambique Channel to the west of the islands, a now extinct transform. The rifting is also associated with extensive deformation as well as volcanism in the late Cretaceous and Cenozoic (Eocene to Miocene).

The second separation caused volcanism in the southern part of the island as well as further south, such as on Marion Island. The volcanism was so extensive that in the late Cretaceous Madagascar may have been entirely covered in flood basalts from volcanism associated with this second rifting event. It was at this point in the end of the Cretaceous that Madagascar became entirely isolated from any other continent.

== Modern tectonics ==
Madagascar remains seismically and volcanically active. The most seismically active area is beneath the Ankaratra Plateau in the centre of the island, which experienced magnitude 5.2 and 5.5 earthquakes in 1985 and 1991. The Aloatra-Ankay rift to the north of the plateau is also seismically active, as well as the Davie Ridge off the coast, which is an extension of the East African Rift Zone.

The Ankaratra Plateau contains a major volcanic field with volcanic cones and extensive flows. It was active from the Neogene to the Quaternary. To the northwest, there are the recently active Comoro Islands, which are hypothesized to be related to a hot spot.

The Madagascar plate now moves mostly in conjunction with the African plate, so some believe it should not be still considered an independent plate.
