= Analavory, Miarinarivo =

Analavory
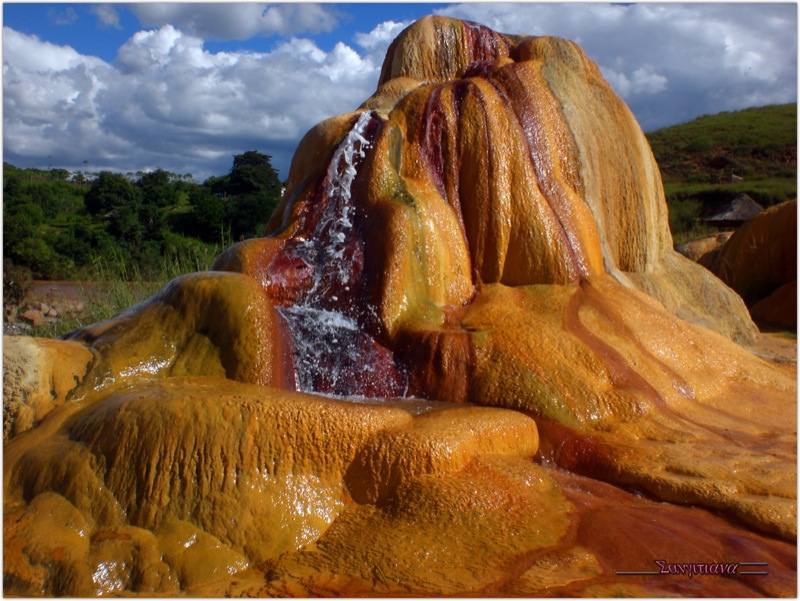
- Geyser in Analavory

- Location in Madagascar
- Coordinates: 18°58′S 46°43′E
- Country: Madagascar
- Region: Itasy
- District: Miarinarivo
- Elevation: 1,199 m (3,934 ft)

Population (2018)
  - Total: 62,130
  - Ethnicities: Merina
- Time zone: UTC3 (EAT)
- Postal code: 117

Analavory is a town and commune in Madagascar. It belongs to the district of Miarinarivo, which is a part of Itasy Region. The population of the commune was 62,130 in 2018. Its location is closest to the geographic center of mainland Madagascar.

Primary and junior level secondary education are available in town. It is also a site of industrial-scale mining. The majority 85% of the population of the commune are farmers. The most important crop is rice, while other important products are maize and tomato. Services provide employment for 15% of the population.

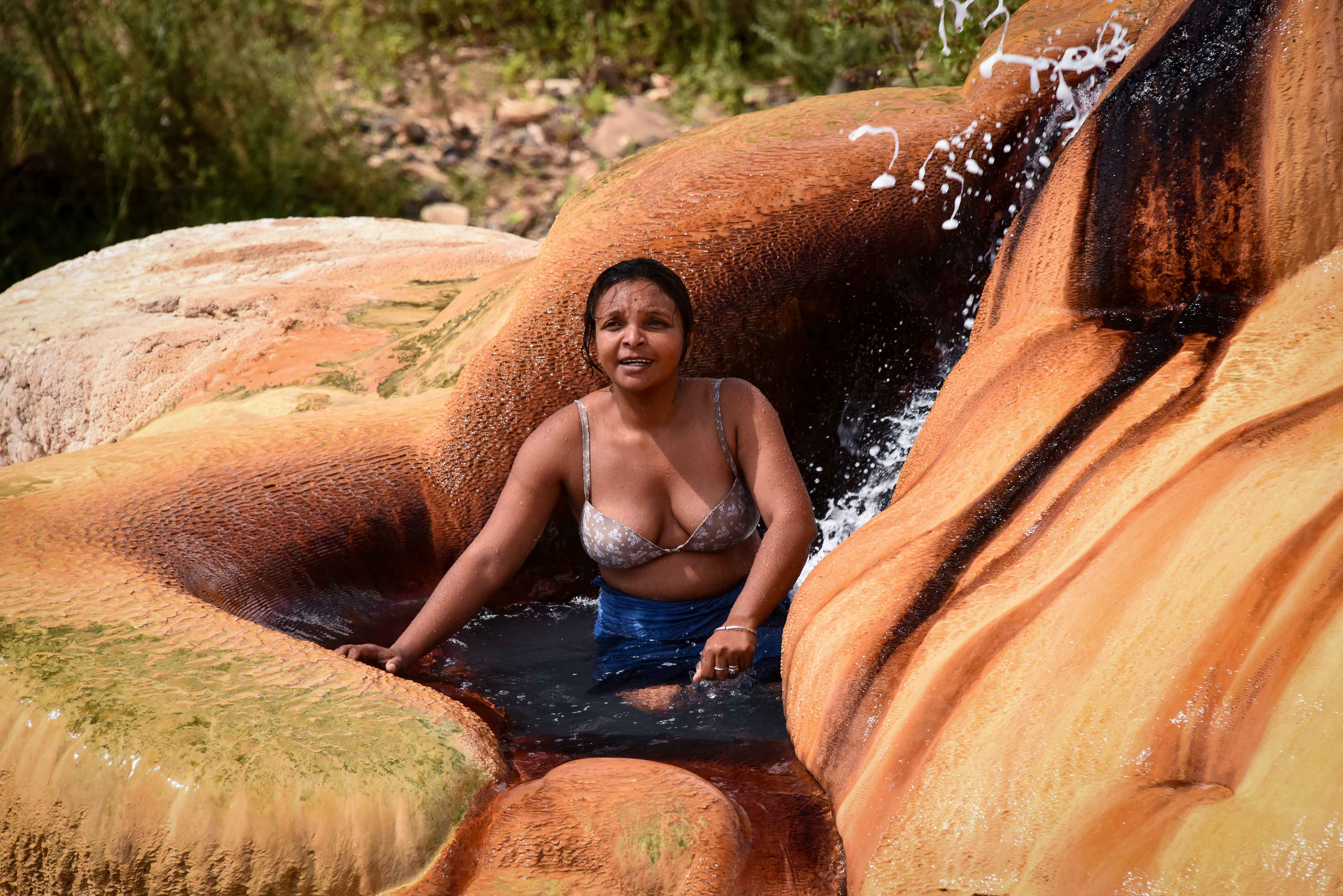
A woman bathes in a geyser in Analavory

Some 12 km north-east from the town are located Analavory Geysers — four cold water geysers.

== Roads ==
The national roads N1b, RN1b and RN43 make junction near or in the town of Analavory.

== Rivers ==
Analavory lies at the Mazy river. Also the Lake Itasy, the fourth major lake of Madagascar, is situated in this municipality.

== Subfossil sites ==
Near Analavory lies the site of Ampasambazimba where several subfossil lemurs were discovered in the beginning of the 20th century.
