= Miarinarivo =

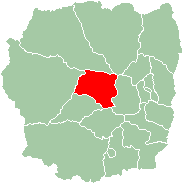
- Miarinarivo

- Location in Madagascar
- Coordinates: 18°57′39″S 46°54′00″E
- Country: Madagascar
- Region: Itasy
- District: Miarinarivo

Area
  - Land: 17.9 km^{2} (6.9 sq mi)

Population (2018)census
  - Total: 13,109
  - Ethnicities: Merina
- Time zone: UTC3 (EAT)
- Postal code: 117

Miarinarivo is a city (commune urbaine) in Itasy Region, in the Central Highlands of Madagascar.

Miarinarivo is located 100 km (62 mi) from Antananarivo, and is the capital of Itasy Region as well as of its own district. It is crossed by National Road 1, which leads from Antananarivo to Tsiroanomandidy.

== Education ==
In Miarinarivo there are:

- 6 primary schools with 2000 pupils
- 4 secondary schools with 1400 pupils
- 4 a Lycée with 900 students

== Sports ==
=== Football/Soccer ===
The local club CNaPS Sport is the best football club in the city. The club has been 7 times Malagasy champions, 3 times Malagasy cup champions and Malagasy super-cup champions once.

== Religion ==
- FJKM - Fiangonan'i Jesoa Kristy eto Madagasikara (Church of Jesus Christ in Madagascar)
- FLM - Fiangonana Loterana Malagasy (Malagasy Lutheran Church)
- Roman Catholic Church (Katedraly Kristy Mpanjaka (Cathedral of Christ the King)).
