= Church of Jesus Christ in Madagascar =

Christian denomination in Madagascar

- Classification: Protestant
- Orientation: Continental Reformed
- Theology: Reformed
- Polity: Presbyterian
- Moderator: Pastor Ammi Irako Andriamahazosoa
- Associations: World Communion of Reformed Churches, World Council of Churches
- Origin: 1968; Madagascar
- Branched from: London Missionary Society/Paris Evangelical Missionary Society
- Separations: New Protestant Church in Madagascar
- Congregations: 7,200
- Members: 6 million
- Ministers: 1,500
- Official website: https://www.fjkm.mg

The Church of Jesus Christ in Madagascar (Malagasy: Fiangonan'i Jesoa Kristy eto Madagasikara (FJKM)); is the second-largest Christian denomination in Madagascar. The current officers include the Rev. Ammi Irako Andriamahazosoa, President; the Rev. Jean Louis Zarazaka, Clerical Vice President; Mr. Georges Randriamamonjisoa, Lay Vice President; Mr. Olivier Andrianarivelo, Treasurer, and the Rev. Zaka Andriamampianina and Mr. Benjamin Rakotomandimby, Advisors.

== History ==
Founded in 1968 as a Reformed Protestant denomination by the union of three churches that arose from the work of the London Missionary Society, the Paris Evangelical Missionary Society and the Friends Foreign Missionary Association, the FJKM today has more than 6 million adherents in more than 7,200 congregations and 37 synods nationwide and 1 international synod; the church runs 581 schools. It is a growing church, having planted on average one new church a week for the past ten years. However, there are currently only about 1500 ordained clergy (of whom about 250 are women), so most ministers are responsible for a number of congregations. They are assisted by an extensive corps of lay pastors and catechists who are able to preach and provide pastoral care.

The former Madagascar president Marc Ravalomanana is a member of the church and concurrently served as an elected lay vice-president of the church during his presidential term. This has led to concerns of church and state interests being "not kept entirely separate" in Madagascar.

In 2002, a schism in the church occurred, and the New Protestant Church in Madagascar was formed with 300,000 former members of the FJKM.

Following the 2009 Malagasy protests, the leader of the FJKM, Pastor Lala Rasendrahasina, was taken into custody by army soldiers along with five generals who were selected by Ravalomanana as members of a proposed military directorate that would have run the executive branch after his resignation but instead had transferred power over to the opposition leader, Andry Rajoelina (a Roman Catholic); Rasendrahasina, a cousin of Ravalomanana's wife and supporter of Ravalomanana, was seen as being too close to the former president.

== Statistics ==
In 2004, it was estimated that the denomination had approximately 3,500,000 members in 5,795 churches and 1,200 ordained ministers.

In 2008, in a survey conducted by Afrobarometer, 23% of those interviewed listed the Church of Jesus Christ in Madagascar as their religion. At the time, 23% of the population corresponded to approximately 4,392,080 people.

At the beginning of 2016, the church itself reported that it had 5,053,087 members, 7,200 churches, and 1,500 ordained ministers.

In 2018, in the survey conducted by Afrobarometer on religion in the country, 20.3% of those interviewed listed the Church of Jesus Christ in Madagascar as their religion. At the time, 20.3% of the population corresponded to approximately 5,581,469 people.

In October 2016, the denomination published the most recent statistics. It was reported that the church had approximately 6 million members.

In 2022, a survey by Afrobarometer reported that 25.4% of the population of Madagascar identified as "Calvinist". This corresponded to approximately 7,731,064 people that year.

== General Synod ==
FJKM's highest policy-making is the General Synod (Synoda Lehibe), which is composed of nearly 400 delegates and alternates from the church's 38 synods. The General Synod meets once every four years and it elects the National Council.

== National Council ==
The 100-member National Council (Mpiandraikitra Foibe) meets twice yearly, usually in April and October. It is made up of 50 clergy and 50 lay people, including: 3 clergy representing the seminaries, 19 clergy representing the synods, 7 teachers, and 19 lay people representing the synods. A small number of alternates are also elected in each category to fill any vacancies. The National Council has two permanent advisory committees: one for the Care of the Laity (Filan-kevitra momba ny Fandraminana Fiangonana or FIFAFI) and the other for Care of the Clergy (Filan-kevitra momba ny Fandraminana Mpitandrina or FIFAMPI).

== Church officers ==
The National Council elects officers of the church from among its members: the President (Filoha), two Vice Presidents (Filoha mpanampy) – one clergy, one lay – a Treasurer (Mpitahirivola), and two Advisors (Mpanolotsaina – also one clergy, one lay). With the National Council's approval, the President appoints a Secretary General (Sekretera Jeneraly) to manage the day-to-day affairs of the church. The officers of the church (Biraon’ny Mpiandraikitra Foibe) meet weekly as an executive committee to oversee the running of the church with the Secretary General serving on that committee in an ex officio capacity.

== Structure ==
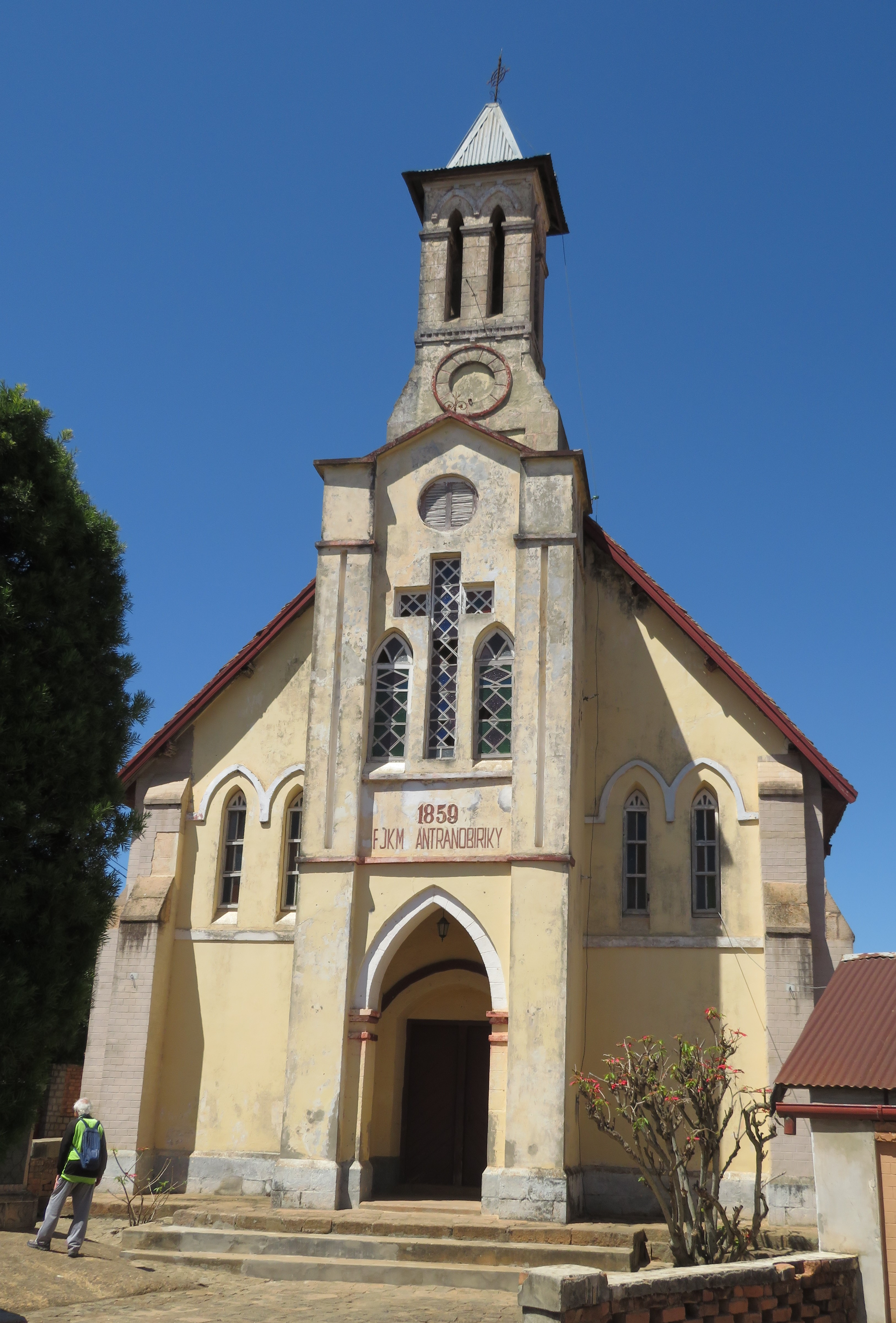
FJKM Church Antranobiriky (built in 1859) in Fianarantsoa

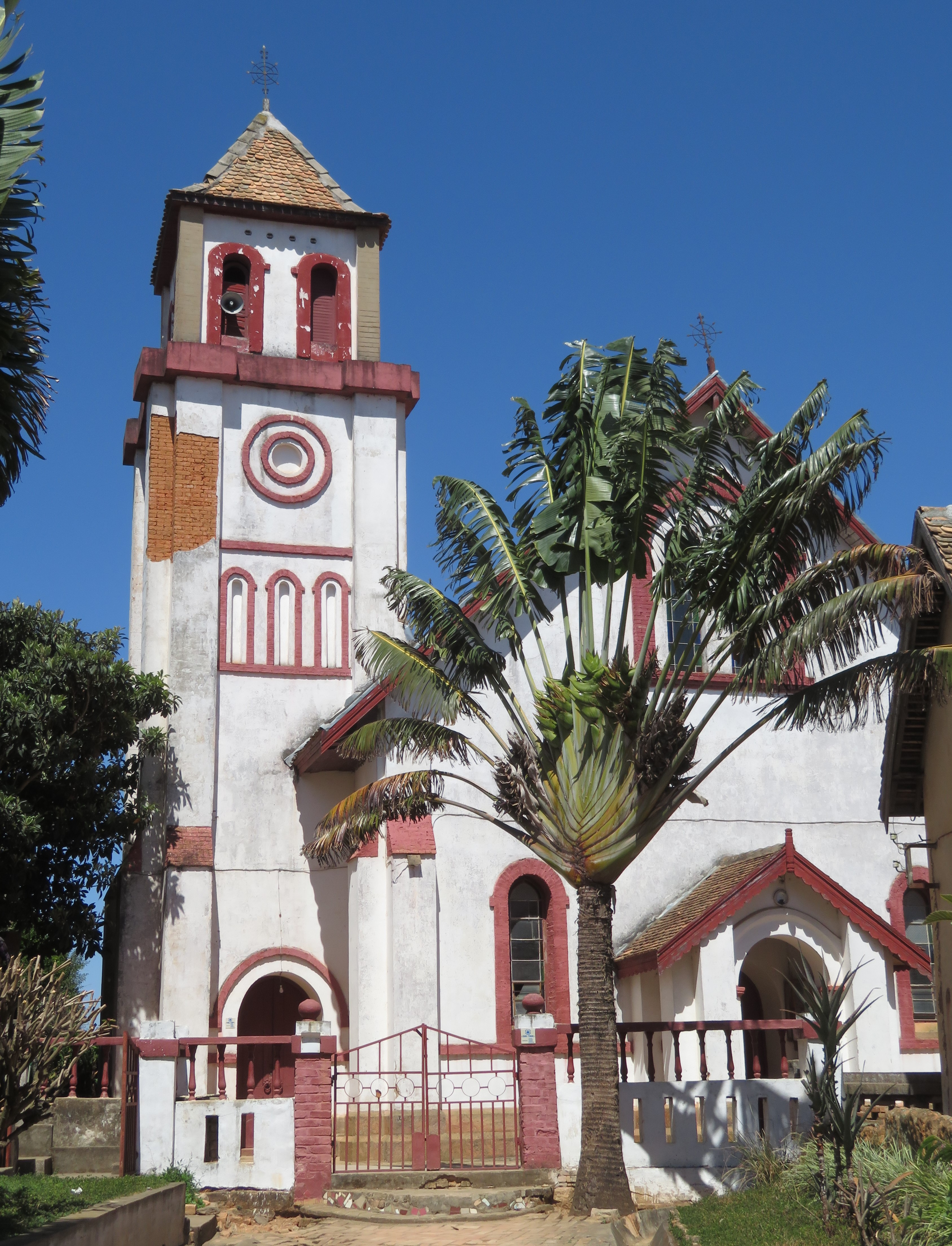
FJKM Church Fahazavana in Fianarantsoa

The national office (foibe) of FJKM houses three main divisions: the Department of Churches (Departemantan’ny Fiangonana or DF), the Department of Schools (Departemantan’ny Sekoly or DS) and the Department of Human Resources and Finance (Departemantan’ny Mpiasa sy Vola or DMV). The Department of Churches is the largest of the departments. Its work includes the administration and development of: 1. FJKM theological institutions: the Faculty of Theology at the Reformed University of Madagascar (which also offers a Masters program) and three seminaries at Fianarantsoa, Ivato (Antananarivo) and Mandritsara, plus a new one in development at Ambatondrazaka; 2. The eight branches (sampana) of the church: Women (Dorkasy), Men (SLK), Youth (STK), Laity (SFL, including the Lay Training School, SEFALA), Sunday School (Sekoly Alahady), Boy and Girl Scouts (SAMPATI), Blue Cross (Vokovoko Manga, which fights drug and alcohol abuse), and Revival (SAFIF, which includes the network of spiritual healing and retreat centres); 3. Two services (sampanasa) of the church: the Evangelism Department (AFF) and the Theological Research and Formation Department (FFP); and 4. The work (asa) of the church, including such diverse initiatives as TOPAZA orphanage, an order of nuns (Mamre), social workers and a chaplaincy program.

The Department of Schools oversees FJKM's extensive network of about 720 schools around the country serving more than 100,000 students. About 80% of these are primary schools; the rest are middle or high schools. The Department of Schools also operates a Teacher Training College that is being incorporated into the newly established Reformed University of Madagascar, which it is working to develop.

The Department of Finance and Human Resources oversees the day-to-day administration of the church, including personnel and fiscal issues. It also oversees a cheese-making business (FIVATSY), a printing press, a bookstore, and the FJKM property unit (FIFA).

FJKM also has a number of permanent committees, such as the church-wide committee to fight HIV and AIDS (KPMS) and the committee on the Life of the Nation that advises church leaders on issues of national governance and reconciliation.

The Secretary General also oversees several structures. These include the communications unit (AFIFAB) which administers the church's print and broadcast media; the Fruits, Vegetables, and Environmental Education Project (MFEE); and the FJKM Development Department (SAF). SAF was started in 1974 and has 58 units, about half of which are medical clinics, spread throughout much of the country. SAF has programs in Community Health (clinics, family planning, prevention of malaria, TB and HIV, etc.), Food Security and Nutrition, Environmental Management (environmental education, reforestation, protection of indigenous vegetation, development of new fruit trees), Water and Sanitation, and Disaster Risk Reduction and Management. It has its own board of directors and has formal nongovernmental organization (NGO) status.

== Ecumenical partnerships ==
Roughly half of Madagascar's population is Christian. There is a small but significant (7%) Muslim presence, but the bulk of non-Christians practice traditional beliefs that include the veneration of ancestors. FJKM works together with other Christian churches in ecumenical bodies such as the Christian Council of Churches in Madagascar (Fikambanan’ny Fiangonana Kristiana Malagasy or FFKM), which it helped found in 1980. It also has a long history of partnership with the Lutheran Church through the Federation of Protestant Churches in Madagascar (Fiombonan’ny Fiangonana Protestanta Malagasy or FFPM), which operates a number of joint projects, including several schools, Akany Fifampandrosoana and the Akany Avoko Children's Home.

FJKM maintains close ties with the successor bodies to the three mission societies of its heritage: the Council for World Mission (CWM), the Evangelical Community for Apostolic Action (Communauté Evangélique d’Action Apostolique or CEVAA) and Quaker Peace and Service.

== Theology ==
- Apostles Creed
- Athanasian Creed
- Nicene Creed
- Heidelberg Catechism

== See also ==
- Religion in Madagascar
- Christianity in Madagascar
