= Bongolava =

Coordinates: 18°46′12″S 46°03′00″E

Bongolava Region
- Region
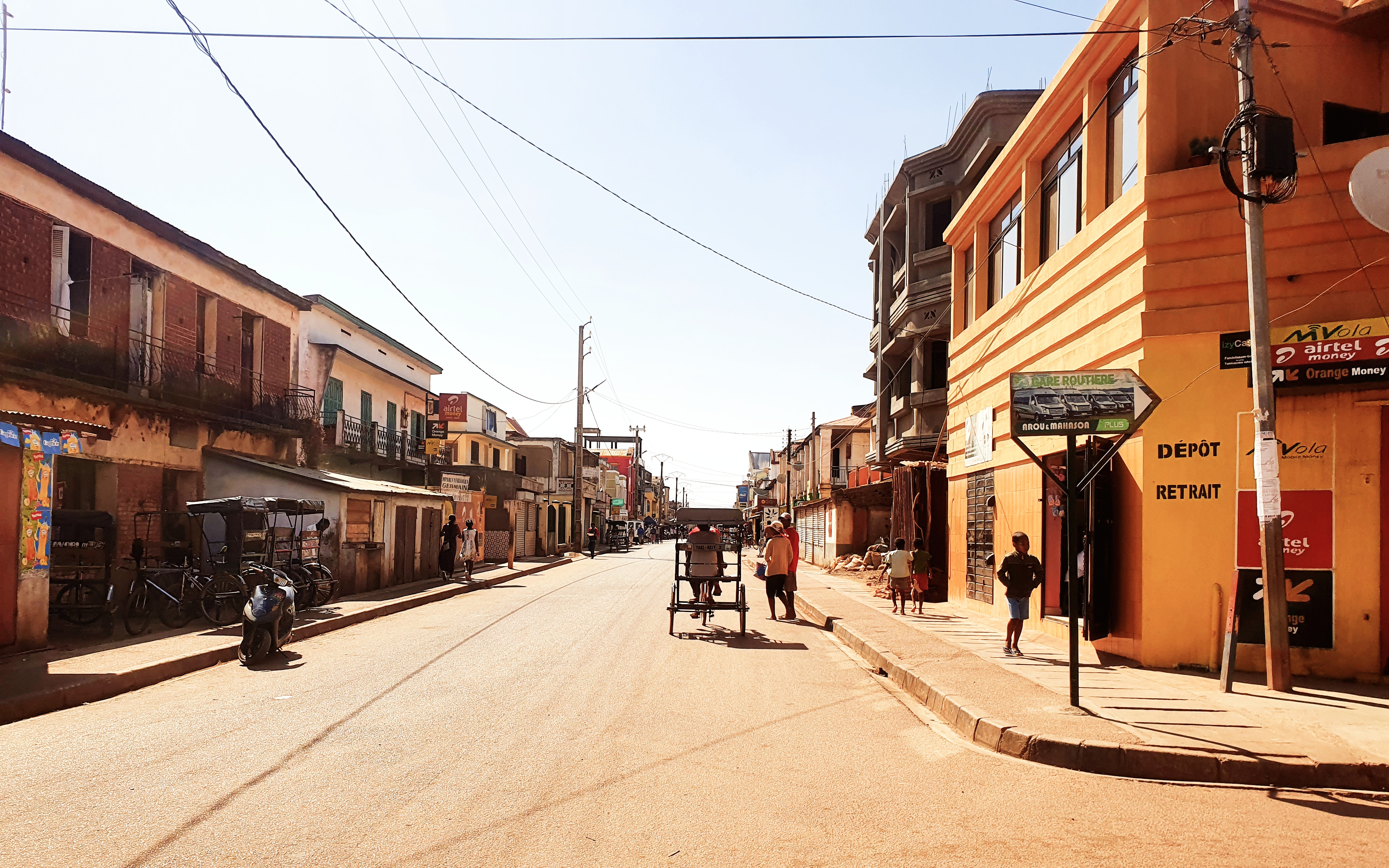

- Location in Madagascar
- Country: Madagascar
- Capital: Tsiroanomandidy

Government
  - Gouvernor: Joseph Ramiaramanana

Area
  - Total: 17,982 km^{2} (6,943 sq mi)

Population (2018)
  - Total: 674,474
  - Density: 37.508/km^{2} (97.146/sq mi)
- Time zone: UTC3 (EAT)
- HDI (2018): 0.493 low · 13th of 22

Bongolava is a region in central-western Madagascar. The capital of the region is Tsiroanomandidy. It had a population of 674,474 in 2018.

== Geography ==
The region is situated in central-western Madagascar. It is bordered by Betsiboka, Melaky, Menabe, Vakinankaratra, Itasy and Analamanga. The altitude ranges from 800 m (2,600 ft) to 1,500 m (4,900 ft).

It is crossed by the Kiranomena River, Mahajilo River and Manambolo River and the Route nationale 1.

== Administrative divisions ==
Bongolava Region is divided into two districts, which are sub-divided into 24 communes.

- Fenoarivo-Afovoany District - 8 communes
- Tsiroanomandidy District - 16 communes

== Transport ==
=== Airport ===
- Tsiroanomandidy Airport

== See also ==
- Antananarivo Province
