= Belon'i Tsiribihina District =

Belon'i Tsiribihina
- District
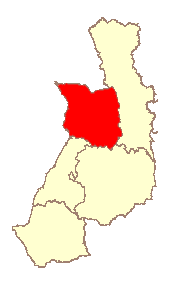
- The location of Belon'i Tsiribihina within the Menabe Region

- Location within Madagascar
- Country: Madagascar

Area
  - Total: 8,038 km^{2} (3,103 sq mi)

Population (2020)
  - Total: 138,775
  - Density: 17.26/km^{2} (44.72/sq mi)
- Postal code: 608

Belon'i Tsiribihina (also referred to as Belo sur Tsiribihina) is a district of the Menabe region of Madagascar and borders the Miandrivazo region to the east, the Mahabo to the southeast, and the Morondava to the southwest. The district has an area of 8,038 km^{2} (3,103 sq mi), and the estimated population in 2020 was 138,775.

== Communes ==
The district is further divided into 14 communes:

- Ambiky
- Amboalimena
- Andimaky Manambolo
- Ankalalobe
- Ankiliroroka
- Ankirondro
- Antsoha
- Belinta
- Belon'i Tsiribihina
- Berevo
- Beroboka
- Masoarivo
- Tsaraotana
- Tsimafana

== Rivers ==
- Tsiribihina River
- Manambolo River

== Lakes ==
The Bedo lake, Kiboy Lake and the Kimanaomby Lake.

== Roads ==
The district is crossed by the unpaved National road 8 from south to north.

== Protected areas ==
- The Menabe Antimena protected area is in this district.
- Tsingy de Bemaraha Strict Nature Reserve

== Site RAMSAR ==
- the Bedo lake
