= Capital punishment in Madagascar =

Capital punishment was abolished in Madagascar in 2015. The last execution in Madagascar was carried out in 1958. Prior to de jure abolition, Madagascar was classified as "Abolitionist in Practice."

Madagascar signed the Second Optional Protocol to the International Covenant on Civil and Political Rights on 24 Sep 2012 and ratified it on 21 Sep 2017.

== Methods and laws ==
Documented executions in Madagascar have been carried out by impalement, firing squad, and decapitation; at least one execution by firing squad took place in public. (Note: "Noteworthy cases" section discusses executions by different methods throughout Madagascar's history, with sources.)

== Noteworthy cases ==
Some of Madagascar's early executions took place throughout the 1830s as part of Queen Ranalova I's crackdown on Christianity due to her fear of foreign influence, as London-based missionaries had introduced Christianity to Madagascar a decade prior.. One executed woman, Rafaravavy Rasalama, underwent torture a day before she was executed by spearing in the side in 1837; Rasalama subsequently became a religious martyr in Malagasy culture. Prior, there are records of several executions taking place in the 1810s as part of newly-crowned Prince Radama's attempts to eliminate prospective political opponents from his wife Ranalova I's family.

On 11 October 1896, while Madagascar was still under French colonial rule, Malagasy politician Rabezandrina Rainandriamampandry was arrested alongside Prince Ratsimamanga. On 15 October 1896, Rainandriamampandry and Ratsimamanga were convicted of participating in Menalamba, an insurrection against French colonial rule, and sentenced to death; their executions were summarily carried out later that day. The two were both publicly executed by firing squad; the executions were photographed. French General Resident Joseph Gallieni ordered the men's arrests and executions, and the French government intended for the executions to serve as an example to others considering insurrection against colonization. A month after their executions, the Paris-based newspaper Le Petit Journal published an opinion piece expressing approval of the executions, their intended function as a deterrent, and the expediency in carrying them out.

On 30 August 1897, French colonial troops executed Toera, a Sakalava king, as they were attempting to quell a rebellion in Ambiky, Menabe. His skull ended up on display in the Natural Museum of Natural History in Paris. Another two individuals who were executed had their remains later exhibited at Paris's Musée de l'Homme. All three were executed by decapitation. In 2024, Toera's great-granddaughters contacted the French ambassador to request the return of his skull and the two others housed at the museum. Although DNA tests did not confirm that the National Museum's skull belonged to Toera, a spirit medium concluded the skull belonged to Toera after an examination, and in 2025, the skull was returned to Madagascar; the return prompted a ceremony attended by Madagascan president Andry Rajoelina.
