= Isalo =

- Location in Madagascar
- Coordinates: 19°44′S 45°26′E
- Country: Madagascar
- Region: Menabe
- District: Miandrivazo

Area
  - Land: 340.71 km^{2} (131.55 sq mi)
- Elevation: 57 m (187 ft)

Population (209)
  - Total: 12,930
  - Density: 38/km^{2} (98/sq mi)
- Time zone: UTC3 (EAT)
- Postal code: 617

Isalo is a rural municipality in Madagascar. It belongs to the district of Miandrivazo, which is part of the Menabe Region. The population of the commune was estimated to be approximately 12,930 in 2009.

Only primary schooling is available. Fifty per cent of the population of the commune are farmers, while an additional 30% receive their livelihood from raising livestock. The most important crop is beans, while other important products are maize and rice. Services provide employment for 10% of the population. Additionally, fishing employs 10% of the population.

== Roads ==
Isalo is 38 km south-west of Miandrivazo. Only unpaved secondary roads lead to the municipality. These are drivable but in a bad state of repair and it takes 90 minutes to reach the village.

== Fokontany (villages) ==
8 villages (fokontany) are part of the municipality:

- Isalo - 2750 inhabitants
- Analambiby - 3524 inhabitants
- Soatana Morlot - 955 inhabitants
- Antsikida - 1250 inhabitants
- Bepaha - 1204 inhabitants
- Mahatsinjo - 1205 inhabitants
- Adabozato - 900 inhabitants
- Soafaniry Mahavelo (also called Beoro) - 1142 inhabitants

== Rivers ==
The Tsiribihina River and the Mahajilo River that flows west of Bepaha are in this municipality.
