= Betsiriry =

Historical Malagasy region

- Common languages: Merina
- Religion: Traditional beliefs
- Government: Local chieftaincy
- Today part of: Madagascar

Betsiriry was a historical region in Madagascar, located between the two affluents of the Tsiribihina River: the Mahajilo and the Mania. Betsiriry was also known for its auriferous deposits.Betsiriry currently belongs to the Miandrivazo District.

== History ==
Betsiriry is one of the regions settled by communities of internal refugees in Madagascar, whose intermarriage led to the formation of groups known as the Bemihimpa. Most refugees in Betsiriry were of Merina origin, particularly from Vonizongo, Marovatana, and Vakinankaratra areas disproportionately affected by the policies of Queen Ranavalona I or by the unrest following the assassination of Radama II.

Other groups, including Sakalava, Betsileo, Bara, and African or Malagasy slaves, also sought refuge in Betsiriry to escape conflicts in their original homeland or seeking freedom. Betsiriry remained autonomous from surrounding monarchies.

By the late 19th century, the Bemihimpa were known as bandits called Fahavalos who raided Imerina and Betsileo territories. The Bemihimpa leaders of these bands allied themselves with Toera, especially Mahatanty, in resisting French colonial troops. Eventually, the Bemihimpa leaders submitted to the French, and Betsiriry was occupied by French forces, with Mahatanty fleeing the region.

== See also ==
- Valalafotsy, Land of Vazimba refugees
- Marofotsy, Malagasy tribe of Vazimba, Sakalava, Sihanaka and Merina origins
