= Ambatolahy, Miandrivazo =

Ambatolahy
- Location in Madagascar
- Coordinates: 20°0′S 45°32′E
- Country: Madagascar
- Region: Menabe
- District: Miandrivazo

Area
  - Total: 993 km^{2} (383 sq mi)
- Elevation: 93 m (305 ft)

Population (2001)
  - Total: 17,482
- Time zone: UTC3 (EAT)
- Postal code: 617
- Climate: Aw

Ambatolahy is a rural municipality in Madagascar. It belongs to the district of Miandrivazo, in the eastern part of Menabe Region, on the border with Amoron'i Mania. The population of this municipality was estimated to be approximately 17482 in 2016.

Primary and junior level secondary education are available in town. The majority 60% of the population of the commune are farmers, while an additional 20% receives their livelihood from raising livestock. The most important crop is rice, while other important products are beans and maize. Services provide employment for 2% of the population.

There is a tobacco planting concession in this municipality since 1930. Nowadays 4500 ha are planted.

== Rivers ==
This municipality is crossed by the Sakeny and Manambolo Rivers.

== Roads ==
In its north-west part, this municipality is crossed by the National road 34.
