= Amboalimena =

- Location in Madagascar
- Coordinates: 19°16′S 44°27′E
- Country: Madagascar
- Region: Menabe
- District: Belo sur Tsiribihina
- Elevation: 13 m (43 ft)

Population (2001)
  - Total: 1,000
- Time zone: UTC3 (EAT)

Amboalimena is a town and commune (Malagasy: kaominina) in Madagascar. Administratively, it is part of the district of Belo sur Tsiribihina District, in Menabe Region. The population of the commune was approximately 1,000 at the 2001 commune census.

Only primary schooling is available. The majority of the population of the commune are farmers, while an additional 40% receives their livelihood from raising livestock. The most important crop is rice, while other important products are maize and sweet potatoes. Services provide employment for 5% of the population. Additionally fishing employs 5% of the population.

== Geography ==
Amboalimena is situated at 60 km north of Belon'i Tsiribihina on the mouth of the Manambolo River.
