= Dabolava =

- Location in Madagascar
- Coordinates: 19°38′S 45°42′E
- Country: Madagascar
- Region: Menabe
- District: Miandrivazo
- Elevation: 563 m (1,847 ft)

Population (2001)
  - Total: 8,000
- Time zone: UTC3 (EAT)
- Postal code: 617

Dabolava is a rural municipality in Madagascar. It belongs to the district of Miandrivazo, which is a part of Menabe Region. The population of the commune was estimated to be approximately 8,000 in 2001 commune census.

Only primary schooling is available. The majority 50% of the population of the commune are farmers, while an additional 45% receives their livelihood from raising livestock. The most important crop is rice, while other important products are maize and cassava. Services provide employment for 5% of the population.

== Geography ==
The town lies between the Mahajilo and the Mania Rivers.

== Wildlife ==
A the small Amboloandova forest near Dabolava, a small population of Propithecus coronatus was recently discovered.
