= Ankotrofotsy =

- Location in Madagascar
- Coordinates: 19°48′S 45°31′E
- Country: Madagascar
- Region: Menabe
- District: Miandrivazo
- Elevation: 85 m (279 ft)

Population (2001)
  - Total: 8,000
- Time zone: UTC3 (EAT)
- Postal code: 617

Ankotrofotsy is a rural municipality in Madagascar. It belongs to the district of Miandrivazo, which is a part of Menabe Region. The population of the commune was estimated to be approximately 8,000 in 2001 commune census.

Primary and junior level secondary education are available in town. The majority 60% of the population of the commune are farmers, while an additional 10% receives their livelihood from raising livestock. The most important crop is rice, while other important products are beans and maize. Services provide employment for 10% of the population. Additionally fishing employs 20% of the population.

At Ankotrofotsy the National Road 34 crosses the Mania River.
