= Tsaraotana =

- Location in Madagascar
- Coordinates: 19°46′S 44°50′E
- Country: Madagascar
- Region: Menabe
- District: Belo sur Tsiribihina
- Elevation: 34 m (112 ft)

Population (2001)
  - Total: 5,000
- Time zone: UTC3 (EAT)
- Postal code: 608

Tsaraotana is a rural municipality in Madagascar. It belongs to the district of Belo sur Tsiribihina, which is a part of Menabe. The population of the commune was estimated to be approximately 5,000 in the 2001 commune census.

Only primary schooling is available in Tsaraotana. The majority 75% of the population of the commune are farmers, while 15% of the population receive their livelihood from raising livestock. The most important crop is rice, and other important products are beans and chickpeas. Services provide employment to 5% of the population and fishing employs the remaining 5% of the population.

== Rivers ==
Tsaraotana lies at the Tsiribihina River.

== Protected areas ==
The Menabe Antimena protected area.
