= Lake Itasy =

Lake in Madagascar

- Lac Itasy
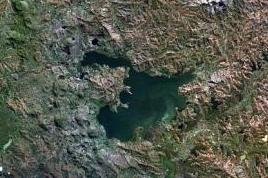

- Location of Lake Itasy in Madagascar
- Location: Itasy Region, Madagascar
- Coordinates: 19°4′S 46°47′E
- Primary outflows: Lily River
- Surface area: 3,500 hectares (8,600 acres)
- Surface elevation: 1,221 metres (4,006 ft)

Lake Itasy also known as Itasianaka is a lake in central Madagascar. It is located in Itasy Region. It is situated in the municipalities of Ampefy, Soavinandriana, Manazary and Analavory.

Lake Itasy has an area of 3,500 hectares (8,600 acres). It is the fourth largest lake on Madagascar, after lakes Alaotra, Kinkony, and Ihotry.

The lake has an average depth of 4 meters (13 ft), and reaches up to 10 meters (33 ft) deep. The water level varies seasonally. There are marshy areas in the southern and eastern parts of the lake.

Lake Itasy lies east of the Itasy volcanic field. The volcanic activity in the region is relatively recent, and the lake was formed when lava flows blocked a river, forming a lake behind it. The landscape around the lake is covered with Strombolian scoria cones and trachyte domes. The volcanic landscape around the lake has many smaller lakes (maars) and peat bogs.

The Andranomena and Mariandrano rivers empty into the lake from the east. The Lily River is the lake's outflow, draining westwards from the northwestern corner of the lake. The Lily is a tributary of the Sakay River, which is a tributary of the Tsiribihina River. The Tsiribihina flows westwards to empty into the Mozambique Channel.

== Flora and fauna ==
There are reedbeds along the edges of the lake, composed mostly of species of the reed Phragmites and the sedge Cyperus, which grow up to two meters high. There are also floating mats of the non-native water-hyacinth Eichhornia.

44 species of birds have been observed at the lake, including ten Madagascar endemic species. Native birds include Meller's duck (Anas melleri), Madagascar grebe (Tachybaptus pelzelnii), Madagascar flufftail (Sarothrura insularis), Madagascar pond heron (Ardeola idae), Madagascar snipe (Gallinago macrodactyla), and Madagascar marsh harrier (Circus macrosceles). The lake is designated an Important Bird Area.

The environment of the lake and its tributary rivers have been altered by pollution, erosion and siltation, habitat destruction, and the introduction of exotic species. The native fish Ptychochromoides itasy, last observed in the lake in the 1970s, was thought extinct until a population was discovered in the Sakay River.
