= Masoarivo, Belo sur Tsiribihina =

Masoarivo
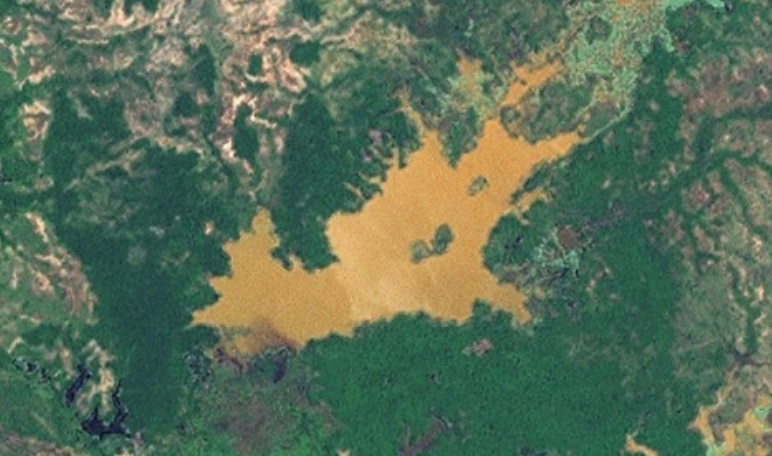
- Lake Hima

- Location in Madagascar
- Coordinates: 19°39′S 44°44′E
- Country: Madagascar
- Region: Menabe
- District: Belo sur Tsiribihina
- Elevation: 25 m (82 ft)

Population (2001)
  - Total: 3,000
- Time zone: UTC3 (EAT)

Masoarivo is a rural municipality in Madagascar. It belongs to the district of Belo sur Tsiribihina, which is a part of Menabe Region. The population of the commune was estimated to be approximately 3,000 in 2001 commune census.

Only primary schooling is available. The majority 50% of the population of the commune are farmers, while an additional 30% receives their livelihood from raising livestock. The most important crop is rice, while other important products are beans and chickpeas. Services provide employment for 5% of the population. Additionally fishing employs 15% of the population.

== Geography ==
It is situated at the Tsiribihina River.

== Lakes ==
In this municipality are situated the following lakes: Lake Hima, Lake Kimanomby, Lake Iboboka and Lake Mikoboka.
