= Menabe Antimena =

Protected area in Menabe, Madagascar

- IUCN category V (protected landscape/seascape)
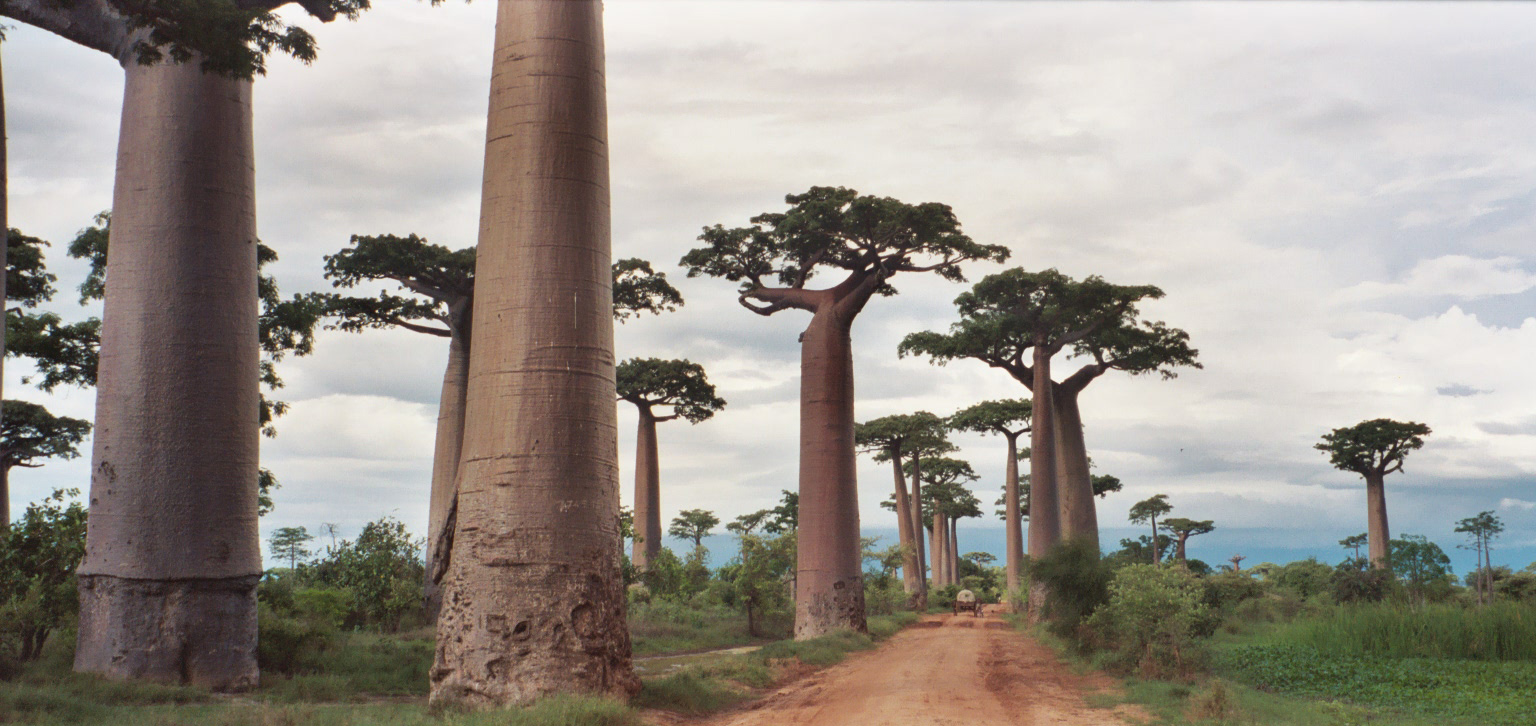
- Avenue of the Baobabs

- Location within Madagascar
- Location: Menabe, Madagascar
- Nearest city: Morondava
- Coordinates: 19°56′37″S 44°40′46″E
- Area: 2,094.61 km^{2} (808.73 sq mi)
- Designation: Paysage Harmonieux Protégé (harmonious protected landscape)
- Designated: July 2007

Ramsar Wetland
- Official name: Zones humides de Bedo
- Designated: 12 May 2007
- Reference no.: 1686

Ramsar Wetland
- Official name: Mangroves de Tsiribihina
- Designated: 22 May 2017
- Reference no.: 2302

Menabe Antimena is a protected area in Menabe region of western Madagascar. It belongs to the municipalities of Tsimafana, Beroboka, Bemanonga, Belon'i Tsiribihina, and Tsaraotana.

Menabe Antimena is on the west coast of Madagascar, south of the Mania River. It covers an area of dry forest, succulent woodland, mangroves, and secondary grassland and scrub. It includes the northern portion of the Kirindy Forest and the Avenue of the Baobabs.

Large areas have been illegally logged, burned, and converted to maize fields, which threatens the area's wildlife, including the critically endangered Madame Berthe's mouse lemur (Microcebus berthae), the smallest primate in the world.

== Tsiribihina mangroves ==
The Tsiribihina mangroves extend along the coast around the mouth of the Tsiribihina River. The mangroves are mostly within the reserve, with the portion north of the river outside it. There are about 20,000 hectares of mangroves, 8.5% of Madagascar's mangroves by area, along with lagoons, marshes, sandbanks, salt flats, and mud flats. About 40,000 waterbirds from 44 species live in the wetlands, including large numbers of lesser crested tern (Thalasseus bengalensis), lesser flamingo (Phoeniconaias minor), greater flamingo (Phoenicopterus roseus), crab-plover (Dromas ardeola), curlew sandpiper (Calidris ferruginea) and sanderling (Calidris alba). Threatened species include the Madagascar fish eagle (Haliaeetus vociferoides), Madagascar teal (Anas bernieri), Malagasy sacred ibis (Threskiornis bernieri), Madagascar heron (Ardea humbloti), Madagascar plover (Charadrius thoracicus), and Madagascar pratincole (Glareola ocularis).

The wetland is also home to the lemur Verreaux's sifaka (Propithecus verreauxi) the Madagascan flying fox (Pteropus rufus), and the critically endangered hawksbill sea turtle (Eretmochelys imbricata).

The Tsiribihina mangroves (Mangroves de Tsiribihina) and were declared a Ramsar site (wetland of international importance) in 2017, with an area of 47,218 ha. Deforestation upstream threatens the wetlands and offshore coral reefs with siltation.

== Bedo wetlands ==
The Bedo wetlands (Zones humides de Bedo) are also within the Menabe Antimena protected area. They are located on the lower Mandroatse River, south of the Tsiribihina and north of the Morondava River, at the western edge of the Marandravy and Analabe forests. The wetlands are habitat for water birds, including the vulnerable Madagascar plover (Charadrius thoracicus) and endangered Madagascar teal (Anas bernieri) and Madagascar heron (Ardea humbloti). The Mandroatse River is home to the Marakely fish (Paratilapia polleni), a threatened Madagascar endemic, and the Nile crocodile.

Local people depend on the wetlands for fish and bullrushes (Typha angustifolia), which are harvested for basketry and house roofs.

The Bedo wetlands were declared a Ramsar site in 2007, covering an area of 1,692 ha.
