= Beroboka =

Beroboka Beroboka Nord
- Location in Madagascar
- Coordinates: 19°59′S 44°36′E
- Country: Madagascar
- Region: Menabe
- District: Belo sur Tsiribihina
- Elevation: 31 m (102 ft)

Population (2001)
  - Total: 2,000
- Time zone: UTC3 (EAT)

Beroboka is a rural municipality in Madagascar. It belongs to the district of Belo sur Tsiribihina, which is a part of Menabe Region. The population of the commune was estimated to be approximately 2,000 in 2001 commune census.

Only primary schooling is available. Farming and raising livestock provides employment for 45% and 35% of the working population. The most important crop is peanuts, while other important products are maize and rice. Services provide employment for 10% of the population. Additionally fishing employs 10% of the population.

== Geography ==
It is situated between Morondava and Belo sur Tsiribihina on the unpaved National road 8.

== Site RAMSAR ==
- the Bedo lake
