= Makay Massif =

Mountain range in Madagascar

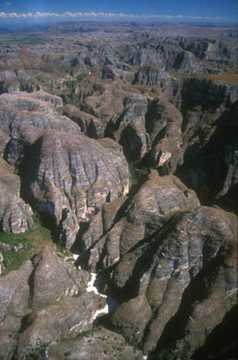
Makay Massif from the air

The Makay Massif is a mountain range in western Madagascar.

== Geography and geology ==
The Makay Massif is situated in the district of Beroroha in the south and Malaimbandy in its north, in the south-east of Madagascar. It covers an area of approximately 4000 km^{2}. It extends north-northeast–south-southwest for approximately 150 km, and is up to 50 km wide. The massif reaches up to 1000 meters elevation. It is deeply dissected by sinuous canyons. It forms part of the boundary between Atsimo-Andrefana Region on the south and east and Menabe Region on the west and north.

Several rivers have their springs in the massif. The Sakeny River rises from the northeastern massif and flows northward to join the Tsiribihina River. Tributaries of the Mangoky River, including the Makay River, drain the southeastern and southern slopes of the massif. The Morondava and Maharivo rise from the western slope, and empty westwards into the Mozambique Channel.

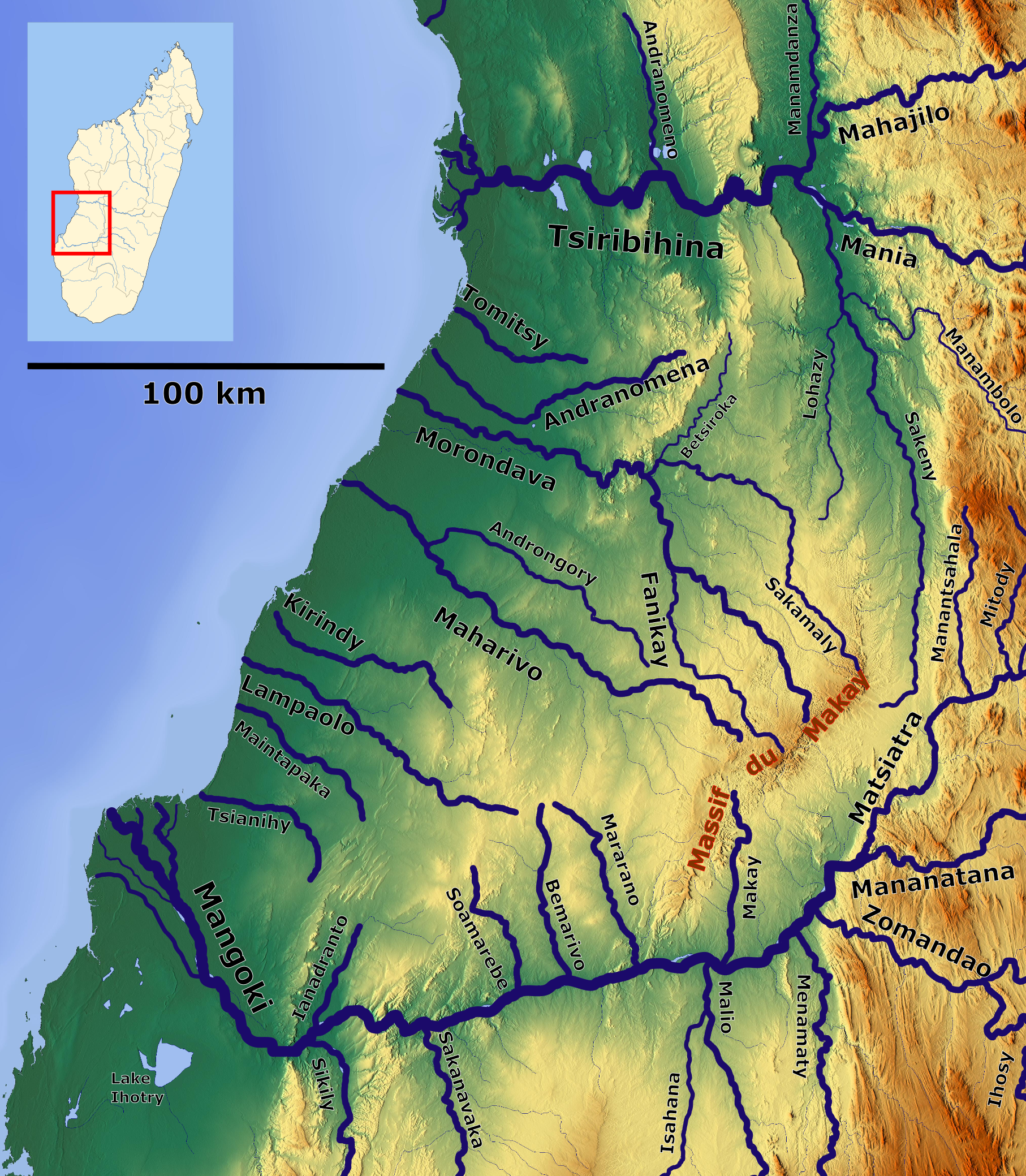
Map of the rivers originating from the Makay Massif

The massif's bedrock is principally Isalo II mudstones and sandstones, also known as the Makay Formation. The formation include fossils of Triassic period.

== Flora and fauna ==
The ridges and plateaus generally have sparse vegetation, with species of Didiereaceae and Euphorbiaceae adapted to the thin soils and dry conditions, and some patches of dry forest. In contrast the canyons are home to lush forests, including stands of bamboo, Pandanus, and the palms Ravenea rivularis and Ravenea lakatra.

Native lemurs include the red-fronted lemur (Eulemur rufifrons), Verreaux's sifaka (Propithecus verreauxi), Coquerel's giant mouse lemur (Mirza coquereli), gray mouse lemur (Microcebus murinus), fat-tailed dwarf lemur (Cheirogaleus medius), Phaner cf. pallescens, Lepilemur cf. ruficaudatus, and ring-tailed lemur (Lemur catta). It is also home to the fossa (Cryptoprocta ferox), Madagascar's largest native carnivore.

== People ==
The deeply dissected topography makes the massif mostly impassable. The massif is largely uninhabited, and residents live mostly at the edges of the massif in villages of 500 or fewer people. Herding zebu cattle is an important occupation for inhabitants, and they also rely on forest resources from the massif.

== Access ==
The road to Beroroha (National Road 15) is unpaved and can only been taken by 4x4 cars.
