= Tsimafana =

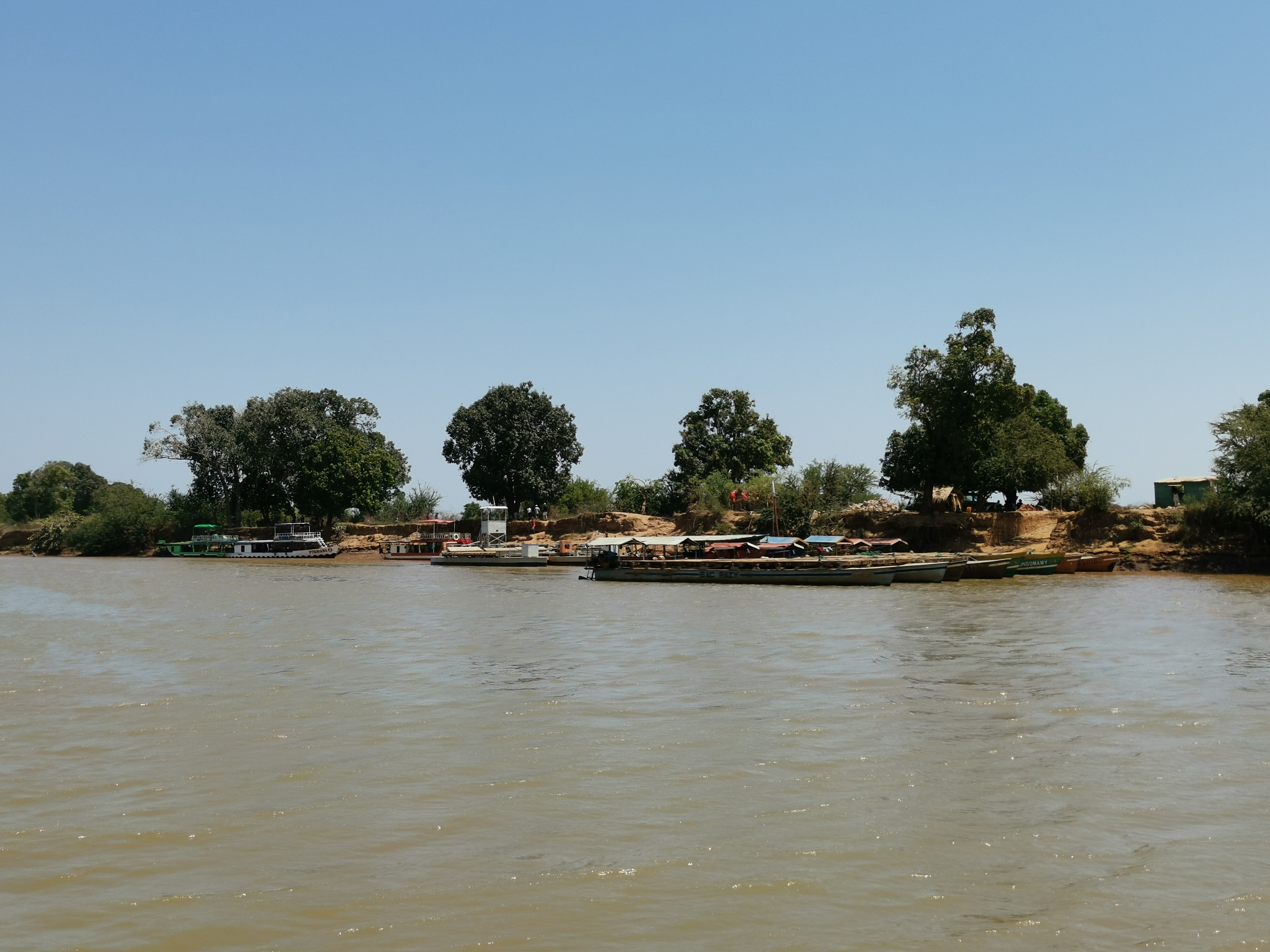
- The Tsiribihina River

- Location in Madagascar
- Coordinates: 19°43′S 44°35′E
- Country: Madagascar
- Region: Menabe
- District: Belo sur Tsiribihina
- Elevation: 9 m (30 ft)

Population (2001)
  - Total: 9,000
- Time zone: UTC3 (EAT)
- Postal code: 608

Tsimafana is a rural municipality in Madagascar. It belongs to the district of Belo sur Tsiribihina, which is a part of Menabe Region. The population of the commune was estimated to be approximately 9,000 in 2001 commune census.

Primary and junior level secondary education are available in town. The majority 60% of the population of the commune are farmers, while an additional 30% receives their livelihood from raising livestock. The most important crop is chickpea, while other important products are sweet potatoes and rice. Services provide employment for 5% of the population. Additionally fishing employs 5% of the population.

== River ==
Tsimafana lies south on the Tsiribihina River.

== Lakes ==
The Kiboy Lake and the Kimanaomby Lake.

== Protected areas ==
A part of Menabe Antimena protected area is situated in the municipality of Tsimafana.
