= Ankirondro =

- Location in Madagascar
- Coordinates: 19°38′S 44°36′E
- Country: Madagascar
- Region: Menabe
- District: Belo sur Tsiribihina
- Elevation: 23 m (75 ft)

Population (2001)
  - Total: 10,000
- Time zone: UTC3 (EAT)

Ankirondro is a town and commune (Malagasy: kaominina) in Madagascar. The town is part of the district of Belo sur Tsiribihina, in Menabe Region. The population of the commune was approximately 10,000 at the 2001 commune census.

Only primary schooling is available. The majority 60% of the population of the commune are farmers, while an additional 20% receives their livelihood from raising livestock. The most important crop is rice, while other important products are beans and lentils. Services provide employment for 5% of the population. Additionally fishing employs 15% of the population.
