= Manandaza =

- Location in Madagascar
- Coordinates: 19°19′S 45°25′E
- Country: Madagascar
- Region: Menabe
- District: Miandrivazo
- Elevation: 94 m (308 ft)

Population (2001)
  - Total: 6,000
- Time zone: UTC3 (EAT)

Manandaza is a town and commune (Malagasy: kaominina) in Madagascar. It belongs to the district of Miandrivazo, which is a part of Menabe Region. The population of the commune was estimated to be approximately 6,000 in 2001 commune census.

Primary and junior level secondary education are available in town. The majority 60% of the population of the commune are farmers, while an additional 35% receives their livelihood from raising livestock. The most important crop is rice, while other important products are bananas and cassava. Services provide employment for 5% of the population.
