= Antsoha, Belo sur Tsiribihina =

Antsoha
- Location in Madagascar
- Coordinates: 19°55′S 44°52′E
- Country: Madagascar
- Region: Menabe
- District: Belo sur Tsiribihina
- Elevation: 70 m (230 ft)

Population (2001)
  - Total: 4,000
- Time zone: UTC3 (EAT)

Antsoha is a town and commune (Malagasy: kaominina) in Madagascar. It belongs to the district of Belo sur Tsiribihina, in Menabe Region. The population of the commune was approximately 4,000 at the 2001 commune census.

Only primary schooling is available. The majority 55% of the population of the commune are farmers, while an additional 35% receives their livelihood from raising livestock. The most important crop is lens, while other important products are sweet potatoes and rice. Services provide employment for 5% of the population. Additionally fishing employs 5% of the population.
