= Ampanihy, Miandrivazo =

Coordinates: 19.4884°S 45.3864°E

Ampanihy
- Interactive map of Ampanihy
- Country: Madagascar
- Region: Menabe
- District: Miandrivazo

Population (2001)
  - Total: 4,000
- Time zone: UTC3 (EAT)

Ampanihy is a town and commune (Malagasy: kaominina) in Madagascar. It belongs to the district of Miandrivazo, which is a part of Menabe Region. The population of the commune was estimated to be approximately 4,000 in 2001 commune census.

Only primary schooling is available. The majority 70% of the population of the commune are farmers, while an additional 5% receives their livelihood from raising livestock. The most important crop is rice, while other important products are beans and maize. Services provide employment for 5% of the population. Additionally fishing employs 20% of the population.
