= Andimaky Manambolo =

- Location in Madagascar
- Coordinates: 19°25′S 44°47′E
- Country: Madagascar
- Region: Menabe
- District: Belo sur Tsiribihina
- Elevation: 91 m (299 ft)

Population (2001)
  - Total: 5,000
- Time zone: UTC3 (EAT)

Andimaky Manambolo is a town and commune (Malagasy: kaominina) in Madagascar. Administratively, it forms part of the district of Belo sur Tsiribihina, in Menabe Region. The population of the commune was approximately 5,000 at the 2001 commune census.

Only primary schooling is available. The majority 60% of the population of the commune are farmers, while an additional 30% receives their livelihood from raising livestock. The most important crop is rice, while other important products are maize and cassava. Services provide employment for 5% of the population. Additionally fishing employs 5% of the population.
