= Beroroha =

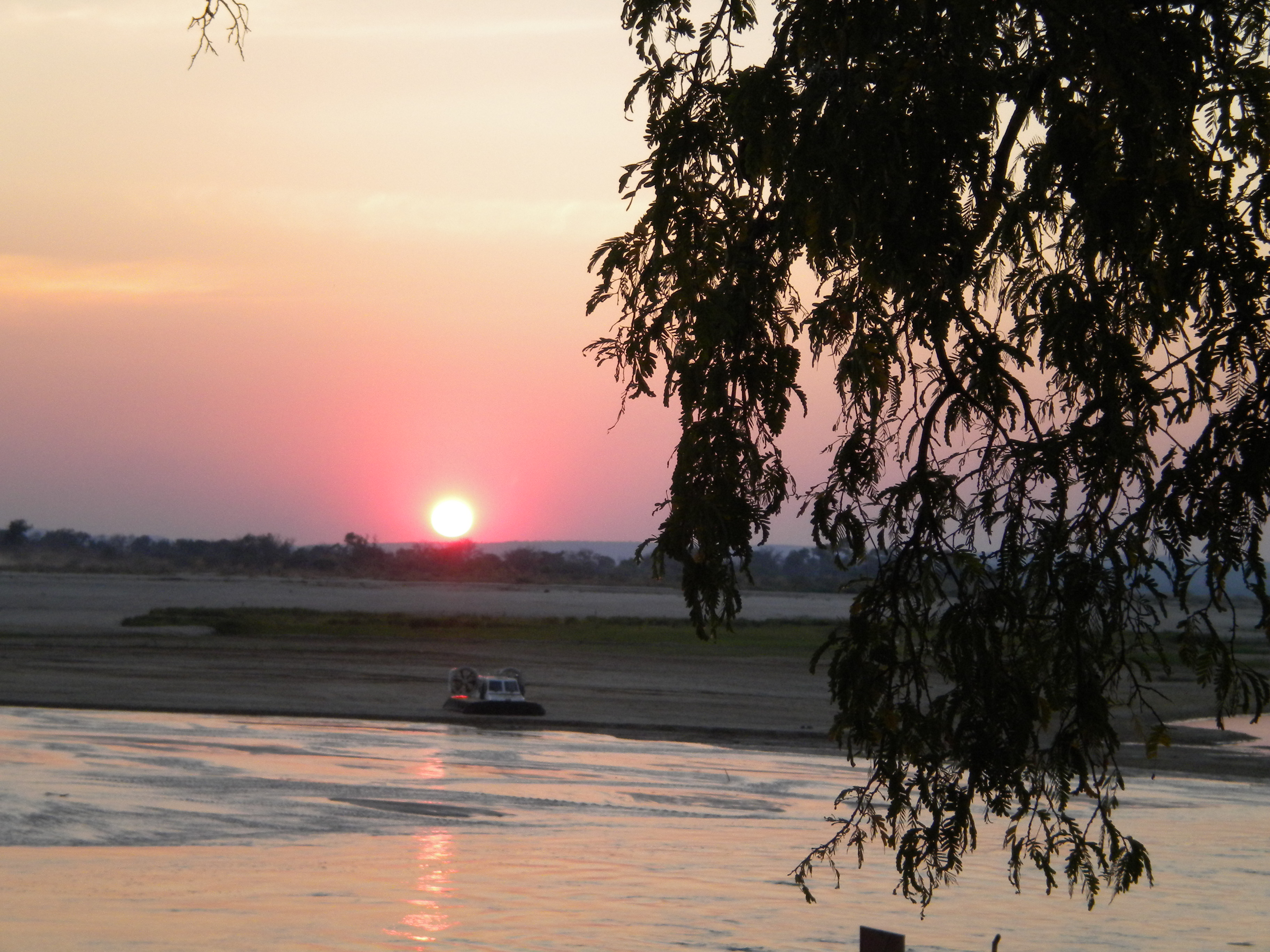
- The Mangoky River at Beroroha

- Location in Madagascar
- Coordinates: 21°7′S 44°38′E
- Country: Madagascar
- Region: Atsimo-Andrefana
- District: Beroroha
- Time zone: UTC3 (EAT)
- Postal code: 611

Beroroha is a municipality in Atsimo-Andrefana Region, Madagascar. Made up of 17 villages, the commune has a total population of 17,000. The area was severely affected by the 2009 passage of Cyclone Fanele.

Beroroha lies on the Mangoky river, which is fast flowing, and can vary between 5 m and 500 m wide. The road from Ranohira (National road 15) is unpaved and only possible with 4x4 and normally takes two days from Antananarivo. An airport serves the town.

== Nature ==
- The Makay Massif lies partly in Beroroha.

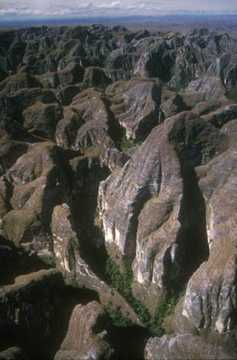
MAKAY

- Manombo River
