= Soaloka =

- Location in Madagascar
- Coordinates: 18°32′S 45°15′E
- Country: Madagascar
- Region: Menabe
- District: Miandrivazo
- Elevation: 163 m (535 ft)

Population (2001)
  - Total: 4,000
- Time zone: UTC3 (EAT)
- Postal code: 617

Soaloka is a rural municipality in Madagascar. It belongs to the district of Miandrivazo, which is a part of Menabe Region. The population of the commune was estimated to be approximately 4,000 in 2001 commune census. It lies on the Manambolo River.

Only primary schooling is available. The majority 70% of the population of the commune are farmers, while an additional 20% receives their livelihood from raising livestock. The most important crop is rice, while other important products are maize and cassava. Services provide employment for 5% of the population. Additionally fishing employs 5% of the population.
