= Belinta =

- Location in Madagascar
- Coordinates: 19°57′S 45°7′E
- Country: Madagascar
- Region: Menabe
- District: Belo sur Tsiribihina
- Elevation: 82 m (269 ft)

Population (2001)
  - Total: 9,000
- Time zone: UTC3 (EAT)

Belinta is a town and commune (Malagasy: kaominina) in Madagascar. It belongs to the district of Belo sur Tsiribihina, which is a part of Menabe Region. The population of the commune was estimated to be approximately 9,000 in 2001 commune census.

Only primary schooling is available. The majority 70% of the population of the commune are farmers, while an additional 29% receives their livelihood from raising livestock. The most important crop is rice, while other important products are maize and cassava. Services provide employment for 1% of the population.
