= Ankalalobe =

- Location in Madagascar
- Coordinates: 19°38′S 44°59′E
- Country: Madagascar
- Region: Menabe
- District: Belo sur Tsiribihina
- Elevation: 24 m (79 ft)

Population (2001)
  - Total: 7,000
- Time zone: UTC3 (EAT)

Ankalalobe is a town and commune (Malagasy: kaominina) in Madagascar. Administratively, it is part of the district of Belo sur Tsiribihina, in Menabe Region. The population of the commune was approximately 7,000 in the 2001 commune census.

Primary and junior level secondary education are available in town. The majority 75% of the population of the commune are farmers, while an additional 5% receives their livelihood from raising livestock. The most important crop is rice, while other important products are maize and cassava. Services provide employment for 5% of the population. Additionally fishing employs 15% of the population.
