= Itondy =

- Location in Madagascar
- Coordinates: 19°3′S 45°21′E
- Country: Madagascar
- Region: Menabe
- District: Miandrivazo
- Elevation: 151 m (495 ft)

Population (2001)
  - Total: 12,000
- Time zone: UTC3 (EAT)

Itondy is a town and commune (Malagasy: kaominina) in Madagascar. It belongs to the district of Miandrivazo, which is a part of the Menabe Region. The population of the commune was estimated to be approximately 12,000 in the 2001 commune census.

Only primary schooling is available. The majority (70%) of the population of the commune are farmers, while an additional 25% receives their livelihood from raising livestock. The primary crop is rice, while other important products include maize and cassava. Services provide employment for 5% of the population.
