= Bemahatazana, Miandrivazo =

Bemahatazana
- Location in Madagascar
- Coordinates: 19°32′S 45°24′E
- Country: Madagascar
- Region: Menabe
- District: Miandrivazo
- Elevation: 67 m (220 ft)

Population (2001)
  - Total: 3,000
- Time zone: UTC3 (EAT)

Bemahatazana is a town and commune (Malagasy: kaominina) in Madagascar. It belongs to the district of Miandrivazo, which is a part of Menabe Region. The population of the commune was estimated to be approximately 3,000 in 2001 commune census.

Only primary schooling is available. The majority 90% of the population of the commune are farmers, while an additional 4% receives their livelihood from raising livestock. The most important crop is rice, while other important products are beans and maize. Services provide employment for 4% of the population. Additionally fishing employs 2% of the population.
