= Ankondromena =

- Location in Madagascar
- Coordinates: 18°23′S 45°3′E
- Country: Madagascar
- Region: Menabe
- District: Miandrivazo
- Elevation: 216 m (709 ft)

Population (2001)
  - Total: 8,000
- Time zone: UTC3 (EAT)

Ankondromena is a town and commune (Malagasy: kaominina) in Madagascar. It belongs to the district of Miandrivazo, which is a part of Menabe Region. The population of the commune was estimated to be approximately 8,000 in 2001 commune census.

Only primary schooling is available. The majority, 70% of the population of the commune are farmers, while an additional 25% receives their livelihood from raising livestock. The most important crop is rice, while other important products are cassava and sweet potatoes. Services provide employment for 5% of the population.
