= Ankavandra =

- Location in Madagascar
- Coordinates: 18°46′S 45°18′E
- Country: Madagascar
- Region: Menabe
- District: Miandrivazo
- Elevation: 134 m (440 ft)

Population (2001)
  - Total: 11,000
- Time zone: UTC3 (EAT)
- Climate: Aw

Ankavandra is a town and commune (Malagasy: kaominina) in Madagascar. It belongs to the district of Miandrivazo, which is a part of Menabe Region. The population of the commune was estimated to be approximately 11,000 in 2001 commune census.

Situation map of Ankavandra

Ankavandra is served by a local airport. Primary and junior level secondary education are available in town. The majority 50% of the population works in fishing. 25% are farmers, while an additional 20% receives their livelihood from raising livestock. The most important crop is rice, while other important products are sugarcane and cassava. Services provide employment for 5% of the population.

Ankavandra lies on the Manambolo River, and has a population of estimated at 5000
