= Manambina =

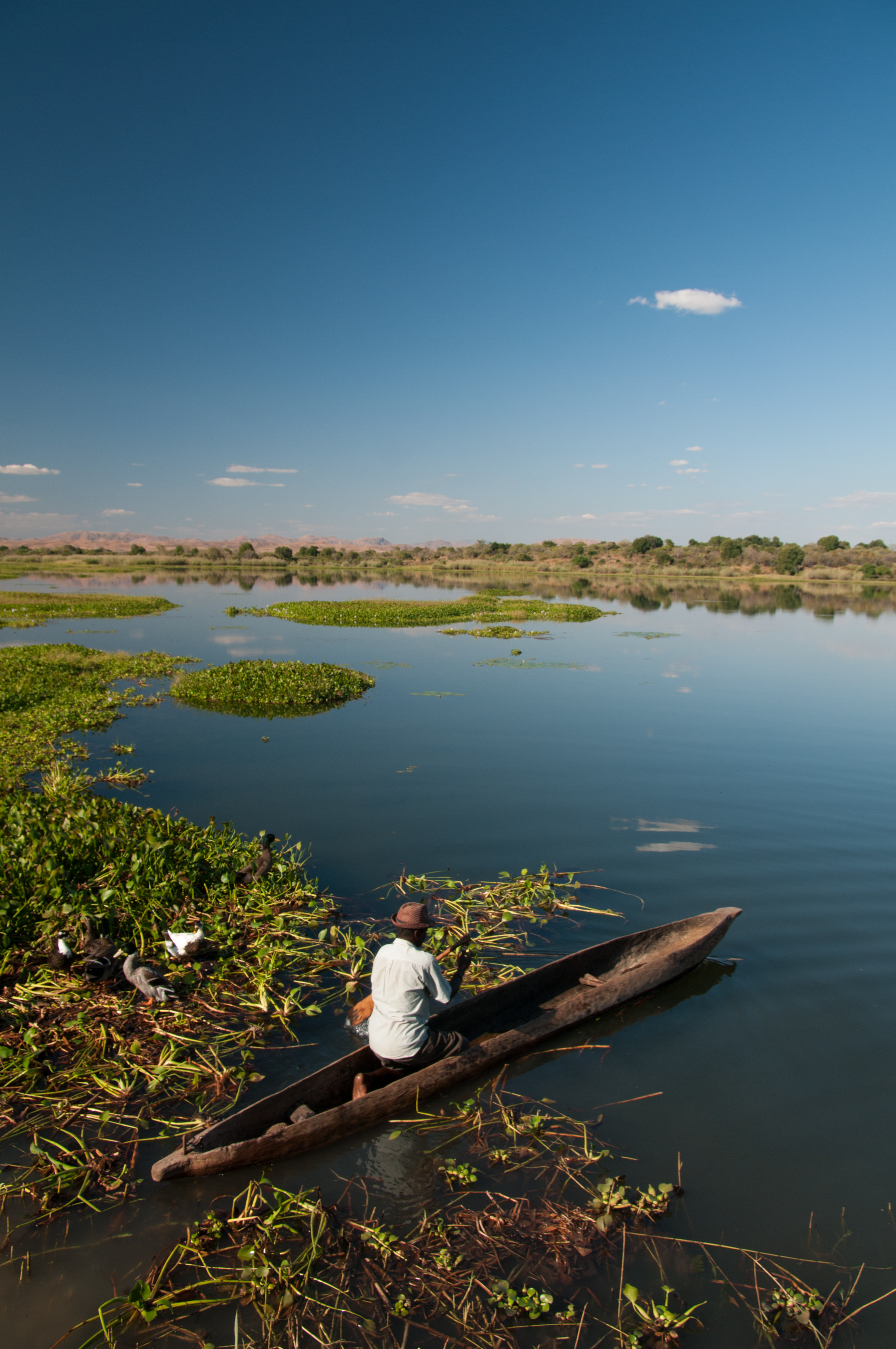
- Manambina, on a lake

- Location in Madagascar
- Coordinates: 20°5′S 45°29′E
- Country: Madagascar
- Region: Menabe
- District: Miandrivazo
- Elevation: 92 m (302 ft)

Population (2001)
  - Total: 7,000
- Time zone: UTC3 (EAT)
- Postal code: 617

Manambina is a town and commune (Malagasy: kaominina) in Madagascar. It belongs to the district of Miandrivazo, which is a part of Menabe Region. The population of the commune was estimated to be approximately 7,000 in 2001 commune census.

Only primary schooling is available. The majority 65% of the population of the commune are farmers, while an additional 20% receives their livelihood from raising livestock. The most important crop is rice, while other important products are maize and sweet potatoes. Services provide employment for 5% of the population. Additionally fishing employs 10% of the population.

== Roads ==
This municipality is crossed by the National road 34
