= Miandrivazo =

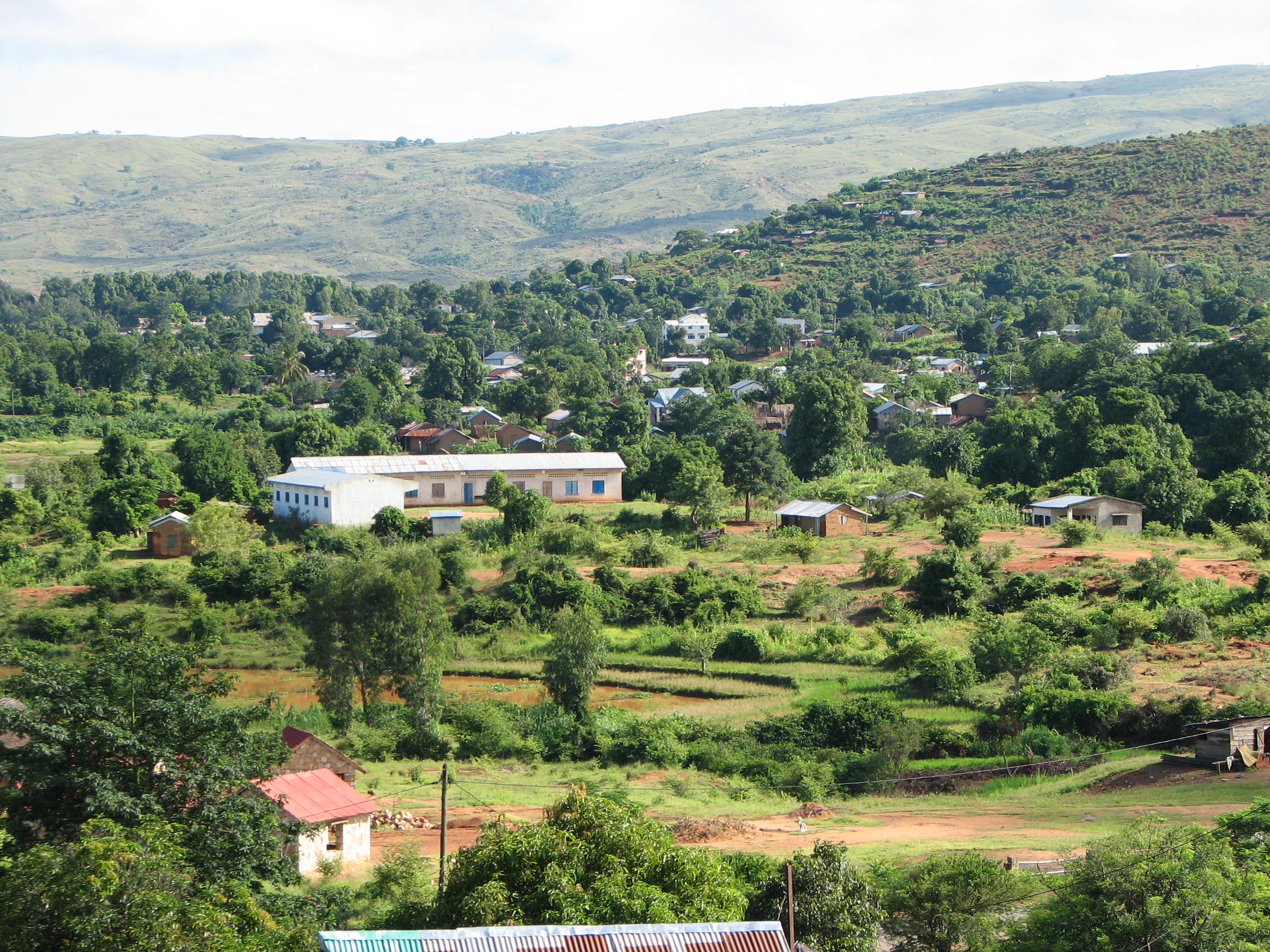

- Location in Madagascar
- Coordinates: 19°33′20″S 45°27′3″E
- Country: Madagascar
- Region: Menabe
- District: Miandrivazo

Area
  - Land: 12,206 km^{2} (4,713 sq mi)
- Elevation: 100 m (330 ft)

Population (2001)
  - Total: 108,000
- Time zone: UTC3 (EAT)

Miandrivazo is a town and commune (Malagasy: kaominina) in Madagascar. It is situated at the Mahajilo River and belongs to the district of Miandrivazo, which is a part of Menabe Region. The population of the commune was estimated to be approximately 108,000 in 2001 commune census.

Miandrivazo is served by a local airport. In addition to primary schooling the town offers secondary education at both junior and senior levels. The town has a permanent court and hospital.

== Rivers ==
The town of Miandrivazo is situated at the Mahajilo River, that forms together with the Mania River the Tsiribihina River. Rafting trips are purposed by several operators on this river from Miandrivazo.

== Agriculture ==
Miandrivazo is a center of tobacco production in Madagascar.

The majority 80% of the population of the commune are farmers, while an additional 5% receives their livelihood from raising livestock. The most important crop is rice, while other important products are beans and maize. Services provide employment for 10% of the population. Additionally fishing employs 5% of the population.
