= Betsipolitra =

- Location in Madagascar
- Coordinates: 18°42′S 45°9′E
- Country: Madagascar
- Region: Menabe
- District: Miandrivazo
- Elevation: 179 m (587 ft)

Population (2001)
  - Total: 1,000
- Time zone: UTC3 (EAT)

Betsipolitra is a town and commune (Malagasy: kaominina) in Madagascar. It belongs to the district of Miandrivazo, which is a part of Menabe Region. The population of the commune was estimated to be approximately 1,000 in 2001 commune census.

Only primary schooling is available. Farming and raising livestock provides employment for 20% and 60% of the working population. The most important crop is rice, while other important products are maize and cassava. Services provide employment for 5% of the population. Additionally fishing employs 15% of the population.
