= Ankiliroroka =

- Location in Madagascar
- Coordinates: 19°50′S 45°9′E
- Country: Madagascar
- Region: Menabe
- District: Belo sur Tsiribihina
- Elevation: 133 m (436 ft)

Population (2001)
  - Total: 4,000
- Time zone: UTC3 (EAT)

Ankiliroroka (also known as Ankiroroky or Ankororoky) is a town and commune (Malagasy: kaominina) in Madagascar. It falls under the district of Belo sur Tsiribihina, in Menabe Region. The population of the commune was approximately 4,000 in the 2001 commune census.

Only primary schooling is available. The majority 50% of the population of the commune are farmers, while an additional 45% receives their livelihood from raising livestock. The most important crop is beans, while other important products are lentils and rice. Services provide employment for 5% of the population.
