= Lily River =

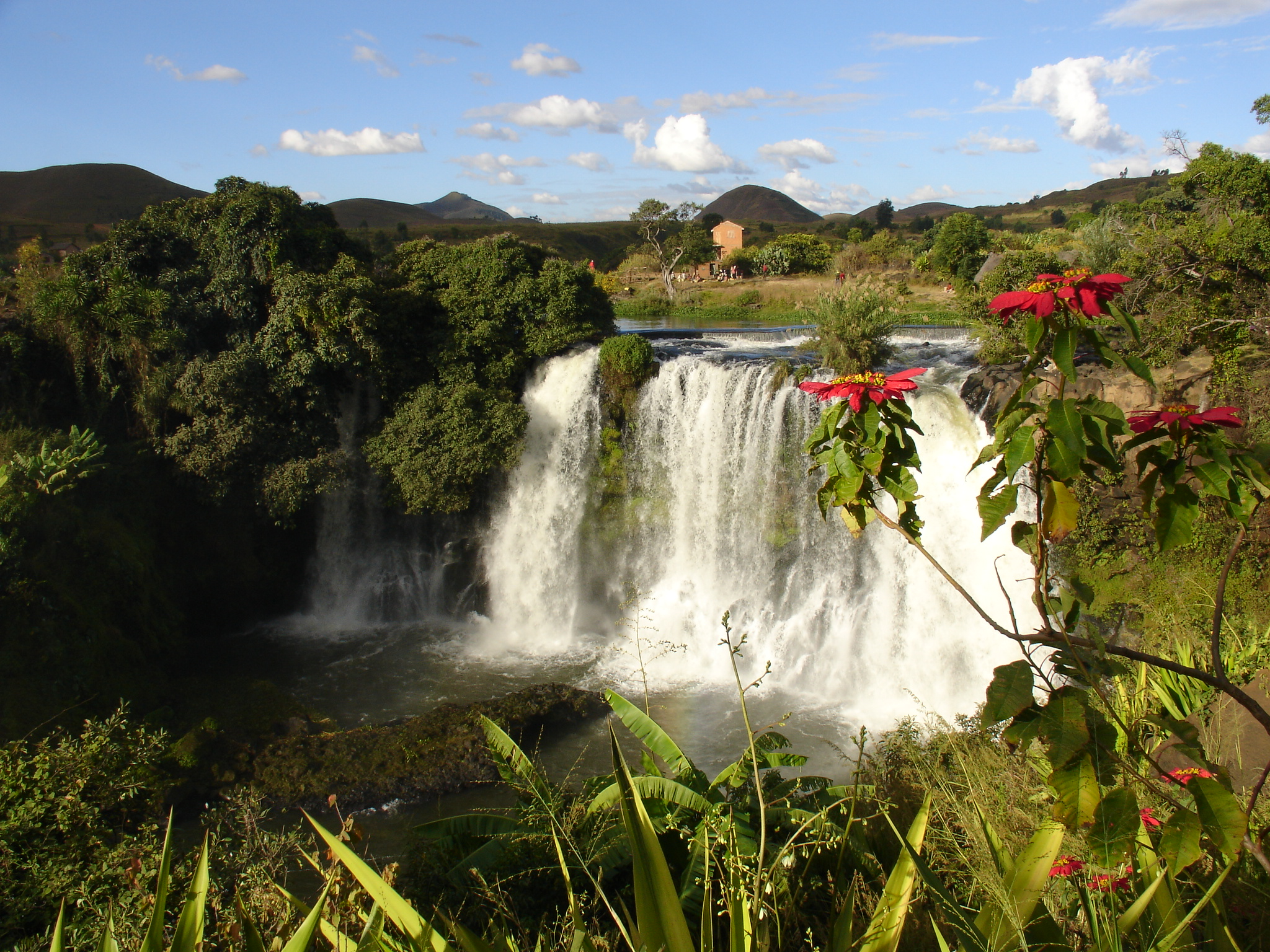
- The Chute de la Lily (Lily waterfall), downstream from the village of Ampefy

Location
- country: Madagascar
- region: Itasy Region

Physical characteristics
- Source: Lake Itasy
- Mouth: Sakay River
  - coordinates: 18°59′45″S 46°29′56″E

Basin features
- River system: Tsiribihina River

The Lily River is a river in central Madagascar. It is the main outflow of Lake Itasy, and flows northwestward to join the Sakay River, a tributary of the Tsiribihina.

The upper stretch of the river is in Itasy Region. The lower stretch of the river forms the boundary between Itasy Region on the north and Bongolava Region on the south.
