= Maharivo River =

River in Madagascar

Maharivo
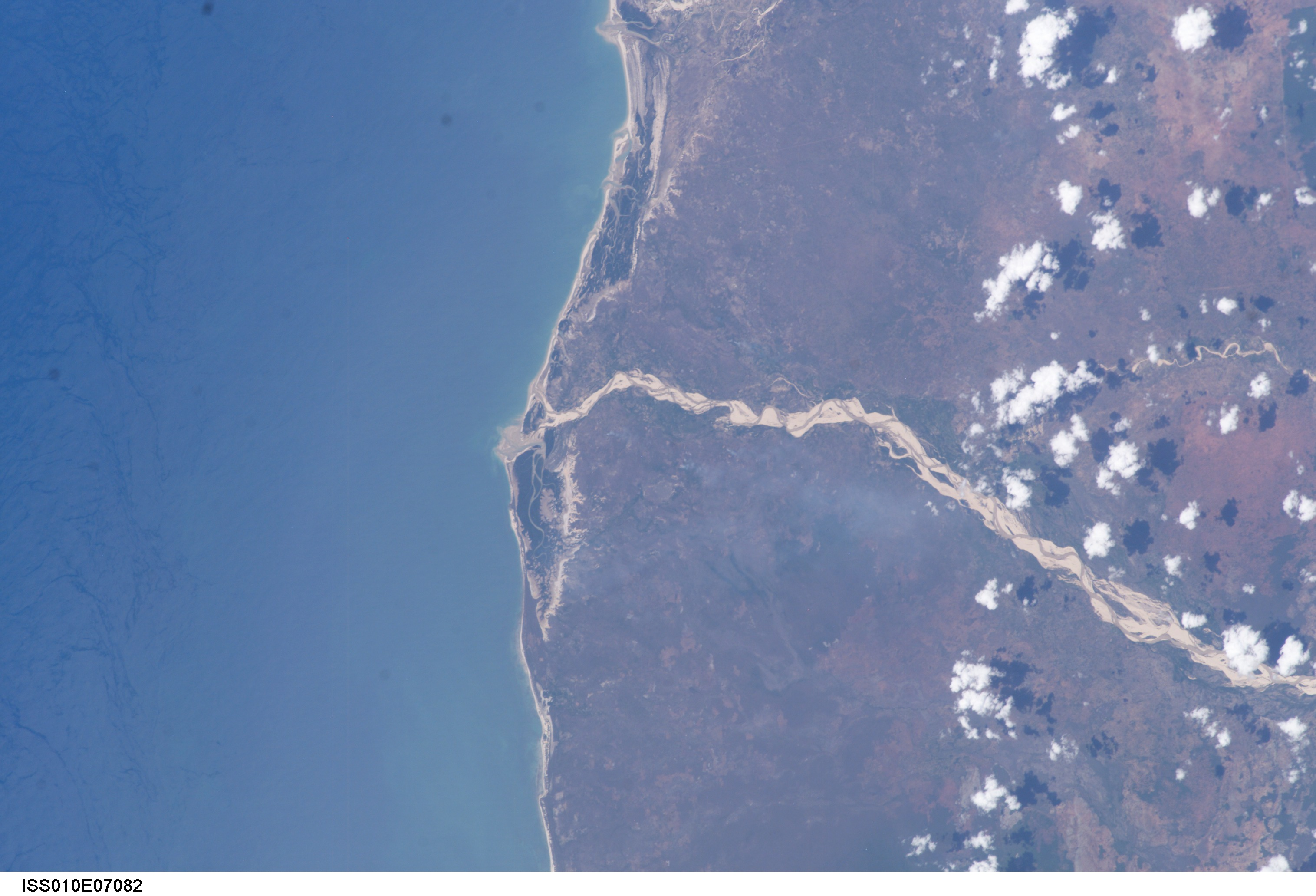
- Lower section and delta of the Maharivo River, taken from the International Space Station

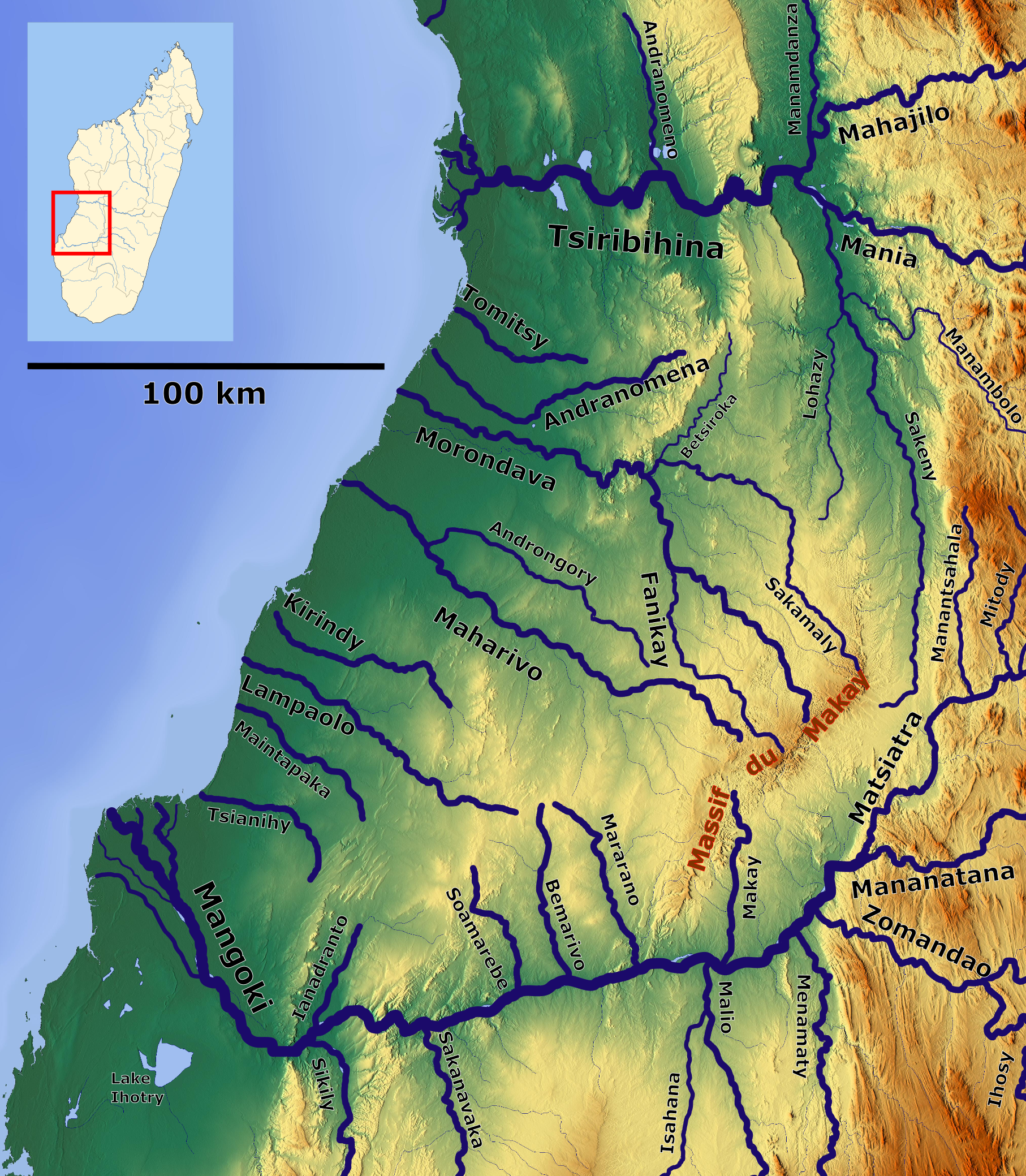
- Rivers originating in the Makay Massif, with the Maharivo at center

Location
- Country: Madagascar
- Region: Menabe

Physical characteristics
- Source: Makay Massif
- Mouth: Mozambique Channel, Indian Ocean
  - coordinates: 20°28′43″S 44°07′14″E
- Length: 165 km (103 mi)
- Basin size: 4,700 km^{2}

The Maharivo is a river in Menabe region of western Madagascar. It originates on the Makay Massif and flows westwards into the Indian Ocean. It is approximately 165 km long from source to sea, and drains a basin of 4,700 km^{2} The climate of the region is semi-arid to arid, and the upper reaches of the river are often dry for part of the year. There are manroves in the river delta. The lower portion of the river and its delta are in Kirindy Mitea National Park.
