= Miandrivazo District =

Miandrivazo
- District
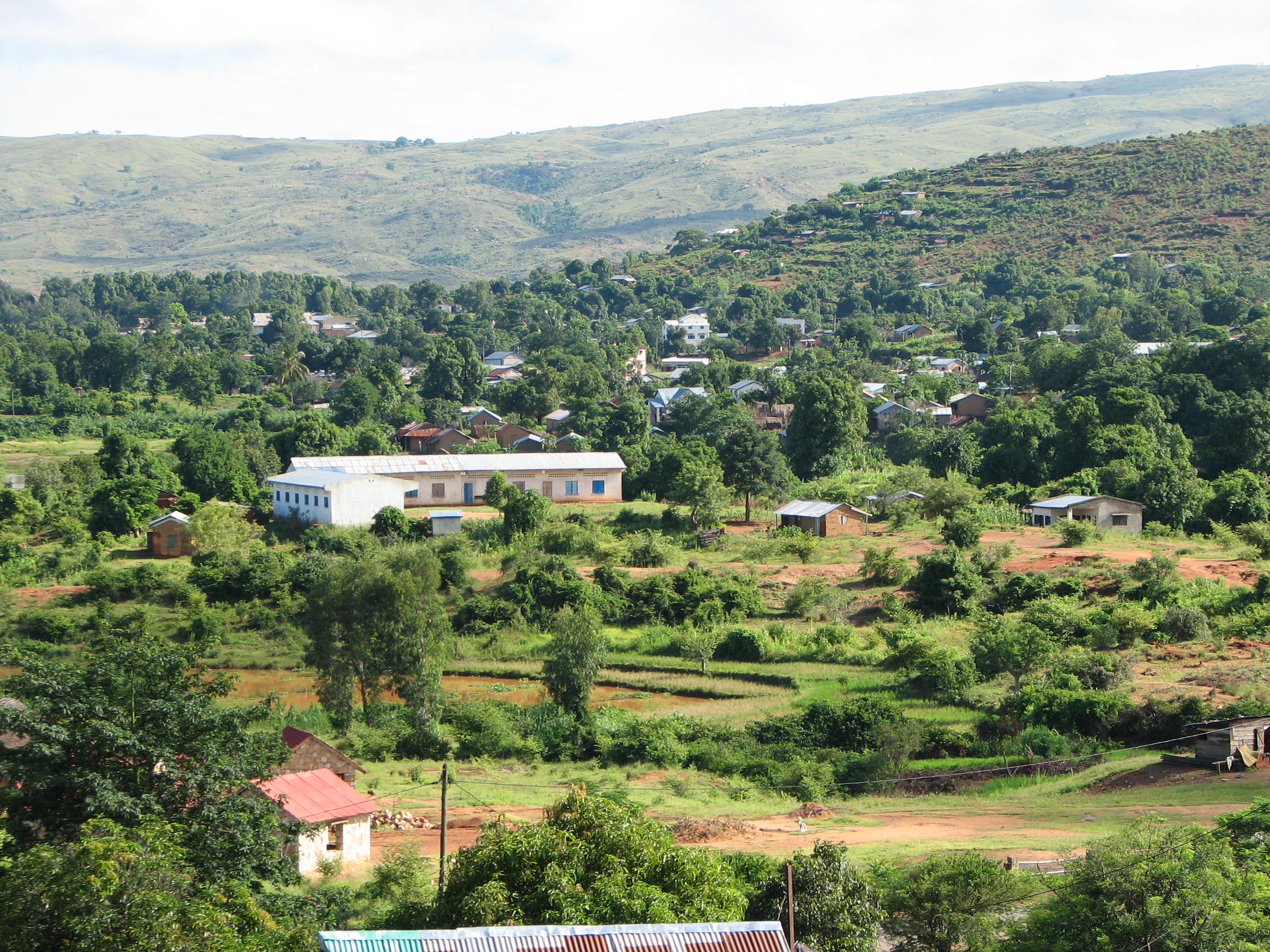
- Miandrivazo

- Location within Madagascar
- Country: Madagascar

Area
  - Total: 4,760 sq mi (12,330 km^{2})

Population (2020)
  - Total: 162,462
  - Density: 34.13/sq mi (13.18/km^{2})

Miandrivazo is a district of Menabe in Madagascar. It is crossed by the Manambolo River. The district has an area of 12,330 km^{2} (4,760 sq mi), and the estimated population in 2020 was 162,462.

== Communes ==
The district is further divided into 15 communes:

- Ambatolahy
- Ampanihy
- Ankavandra
- Ankondromena
- Ankotrofotsy
- Anosimena
- Bemahatazana
- Betsipolitra
- Dabolava
- Isalo
- Itondy
- Manambina
- Manandaza
- Miandrivazo
- Soaloka

== Rivers ==
- Mania River
- Manambolo River
