= Sakay River =

- Sakay River in the Tsiribihina River basin

Location
- Country: Madagascar
- Region: Bongolava

Physical characteristics
- Mouth: Mahajilo River
  - coordinates: 19°24′06″S 46°09′50″E
  - elevation: 680 m (2,230 ft)

Basin features
- River system: Tsiribihina River
- Tributaries
  - left: Lily River

The Sakay River is a waterway in Bongolava, Madagascar, and passes through the towns of Ankadinondry Sakay and Mahasolo.

It has its sources East of Tsiroanomandidy in a plaine at 1400m altitude and its mouth is in the Mahajilo River.

An affluent is the Lily River that has its sources in the Kavitaha Lake in Ampefy (Itasy).

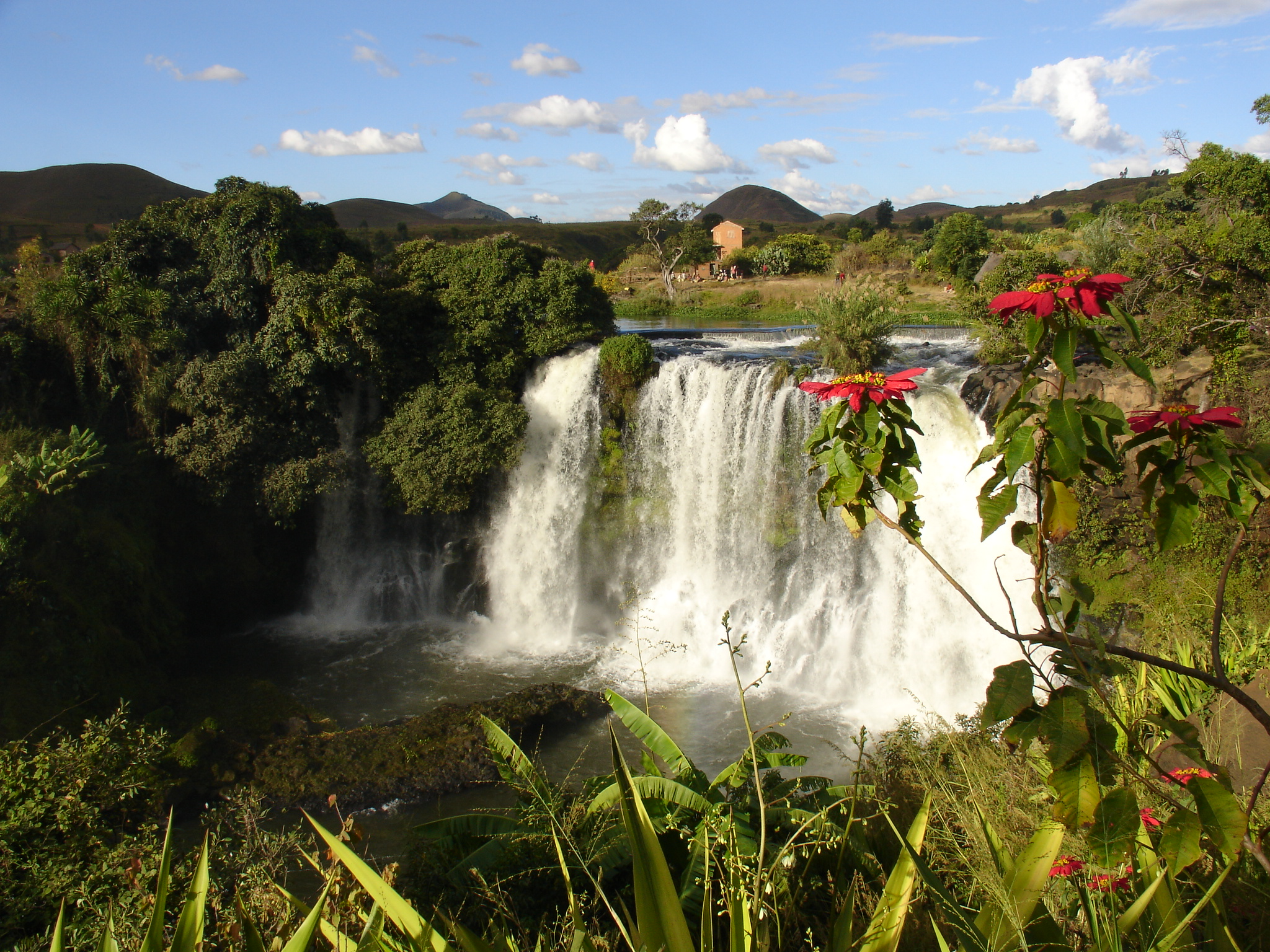
The Lily falls at Ampefy
