= Behisatra =

Behisatra Behisatsy
- Location in Madagascar
- Coordinates: 21°48′S 45°7′E
- Country: Madagascar
- Region: Atsimo-Andrefana
- District: Beroroha
- Elevation: 215 m (705 ft)

Population (2001)
  - Total: 15,000
- Time zone: UTC3 (EAT)
- Postal code: 611

Behisatra is a rural municipality in Madagascar. It belongs to the district of Beroroha, which is a part of Atsimo-Andrefana Region. The population of the commune was estimated to be approximately 15,000 in 2001 commune census.

Only primary schooling is available. The majority 90% of the population of the commune are farmers, while an additional 7% receives their livelihood from raising livestock. The most important crop is rice, while other important products are maize and cassava. Services provide employment for 3% of the population.
