= Sakeny River =

- The basin of the Tsiribihina, showing the Sakeny River at bottom center.

Location
- Country: Madagascar
- Regions: Atsimo-Andrefana and Menabe

Physical characteristics
- Source: Makay Massif
  - location: Beroroha District, Atsimo-Andrefana Region
- Mouth: Mania River
  - coordinates: 19°48′50″S 45°27′35″E
- Basin size: 14,500 km^{2}

Basin features
- River system: Tsiribihina River

The Sakeny River is a river in Western Madagascar. It is a tributary of the Tsiribihina River.

The Sakeny originates on the northern Makay Massif in northern Beroroha District of Atsimo-Andrefana Region. It flows northward through the north–south running Betsiriry plain of Menabe Region, between Madagascar's Central Highlands on the east and the lower limestone Bemaraha Plateau on the west. The Sakeny joins the Mania River, which then joins the Tsiribihina. There are extensive seasonal wetlands at the confluence.
