= Marerano =

- Location in Madagascar
- Coordinates: 21°22′S 44°52′E
- Country: Madagascar
- Region: Atsimo-Andrefana
- District: Beroroha
- Elevation: 347 m (1,138 ft)

Population (2001)
  - Total: 4,000
- Time zone: UTC3 (EAT)
- Postal code: 611

Marerano is a town and commune in Madagascar. It belongs to the district of Beroroha, which is a part of Atsimo-Andrefana Region. The population of the commune was estimated to be approximately 4,000 in 2001 commune census.

Primary and junior level secondary education are available in town. The majority 64% of the population of the commune are farmers, while an additional 34% receives their livelihood from raising livestock. The most important crop is rice, while other important products are maize and cassava. Services provide employment for 1% of the population. Additionally fishing employs 1% of the population.
