= Ankavandra Airport =

Airport in Madagascar

- IATA: JVA; ICAO: FMMK

Summary
- Airport type: Public
- Serves: Ankavandra, Madagascar
- Elevation AMSL: 427 ft / 130 m
- Coordinates: 18°48′22″S 045°16′27″E

Map
- Location of airport in Madagascar

Runways
Direction	Length		Surface
Direction	m	ft	Surface
(15/33)	830	2,723	(grass)

Ankavandra Airport (IATA: JVA, ICAO: FMMK) is an airport in Ankavandra, a town in the Menabe Region in Madagascar. It is located west of Antananarivo, the capital of Madagascar.
