= Beroroha District =

Beroroha
- District
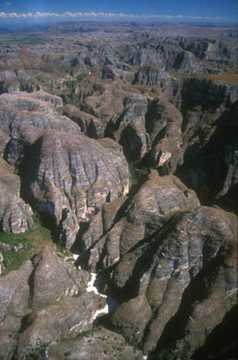
- The Makay Massif

- Location in Madagascar
- Coordinates: 21.514°S 45.234°E
- Country: Madagascar
- Region: Atsimo-Andrefana
- Postal code: 611

Beroroha is a district of Atsimo-Andrefana in Madagascar.

== Roads ==
Beroroha lies on the Mangoky river. The road to Beroroha (National road 15) is unpaved and can only be taken by 4x4 pick-ups.

== Municipalities ==
The district is further divided into nine municipalities:

- Behisatra (Behisatsy)
- Bemavo
- Beroroha
- Fanjakana
- Mandronarivo
- Marerano
- Sakena
- Tanamary
- Tanandava

== Tourist sights ==
The Makay Massif is situated in the district of Beroroha.
