= Anosimena =

- Location in Madagascar
- Coordinates: 19°40′S 45°24′E
- Country: Madagascar
- Region: Menabe
- District: Miandrivazo
- Elevation: 51 m (167 ft)

Population (2001)
  - Total: 6,000
- Time zone: UTC3 (EAT)
- Postal code: 617

Anosimena is a municipality in Madagascar. It belongs to the district of Miandrivazo, which is a part of Menabe Region. The population of the commune was estimated to be approximately 6,000 in 2001 commune census.

Only primary schooling is available. The majority 50% of the population of the commune are farmers, while an additional 30% receives their livelihood from raising livestock. The most important crop is beans, while other important products are maize and rice. Services provide employment for 10% of the population. Additionally fishing employs 10% of the population.

== History ==
This town was captured by the French troops from Sakalava defenders on 12 August 1897 during the Franco-Hova Wars.
