= Fanjakana, Beroroha =

Fanjakana
- Location in Madagascar
- Coordinates: 21°41′S 45°7′E
- Country: Madagascar
- Region: Atsimo-Andrefana
- District: Beroroha
- Elevation: 159 m (522 ft)

Population (2001)
  - Total: 4,000
  - Ethnicities: Bara
- Time zone: UTC3 (EAT)

Fanjakana is a town and commune in Madagascar. It belongs to the district of Beroroha, which is a part of Atsimo-Andrefana Region. The population of the commune was estimated to be approximately 4,000 in 2001 commune census.

Primary and junior level secondary education are available in town. The majority 92% of the population of the commune are farmers, while an additional 6% receives their livelihood from raising livestock. The most important crop is rice, while other important products are beans and maize. Services provide employment for 2% of the population.
