= Mandronarivo =

- Location in Madagascar
- Coordinates: 21°7′S 45°38′E
- Country: Madagascar
- Region: Atsimo-Andrefana
- District: Beroroha
- Elevation: 389 m (1,276 ft)

Population (2001)
  - Total: 7,000
- Time zone: UTC3 (EAT)
- Postal code: 611

Mandronarivo is a town and commune in Madagascar. It belongs to the district of Beroroha, which is a part of Atsimo-Andrefana Region. The population of the commune was estimated to be approximately 7,000 in 2001 commune census.

Primary and junior level secondary education are available in town. The majority 85% of the population of the commune are farmers, while an additional 14% receives their livelihood from raising livestock. The most important crop is rice, while other important products are cassava and sweet potatoes. Services provide employment for 1% of the population.
