= Miandrivazo Airport =

Airport in Madagascar

- IATA: ZVA; ICAO: FMMN

Summary
- Airport type: Public
- Serves: Miandrivazo
- Location: Menabe, Madagascar
- Elevation AMSL: 203 ft / 62 m
- Coordinates: 19°33′46″S 45°27′03″E

Map
- Location within Madagascar

Runways
Direction	Length		Surface
Direction	ft	m	Surface
16/34	3,609	1,100	Asphalt
- DAFIF

Miandrivazo Airport (IATA: ZVA, ICAO: FMMN) is an airport near Miandrivazo, Menabe Region, Madagascar.
