= Belo sur Tsiribihina Airport =

Airport in Madagascar

- IATA: BMD; ICAO: FMML

Summary
- Airport type: Public
- Serves: Belo sur Tsiribihina, Madagascar
- Elevation AMSL: 154 ft / 47 m
- Coordinates: 19°41′12″S 44°32′31″E

Map
- Location of Airport in Madagascar

Runways
Direction	Length		Surface
Direction	m	ft	Surface
	838	2,750

Belo sur Tsiribihina Airport (IATA: BMD, ICAO: FMML) is an airport serving Belo sur Tsiribihina, in the Toliara Province of Madagascar. It is located on the west coast of the island, west of the capital Antananarivo.
