= Ambiky =

- Location in Madagascar
- Coordinates: 19°27′S 44°57′E
- Country: Madagascar
- Region: Menabe
- District: Belo sur Tsiribihina
- Elevation: 61 m (200 ft)

Population (2001)
  - Total: 2,000
- Time zone: UTC3 (EAT)
- Postal code: 608

Ambiky is a municipality in Madagascar. Administratively, it is part of the district of Belo sur Tsiribihina, in Menabe Region. The population of the commune was approximately 2,000 at the 2001 commune census.

Only primary schooling is available. The majority 65% of the population of the commune are farmers, while an additional 34% receives their livelihood from raising livestock. The most important crop is rice, while other important products are cassava and sweet potatoes. Services provide employment for 1% of the population.

== History ==
This town was captured by the French troops from Sakalava defenders in the end of August 1897 during the Franco-Hova Wars. The Sakalava king, Itoera was killed with both of his generals and many of his nobles.
