= Rafaravavy Rasalama =

Malagasy Christian martyr

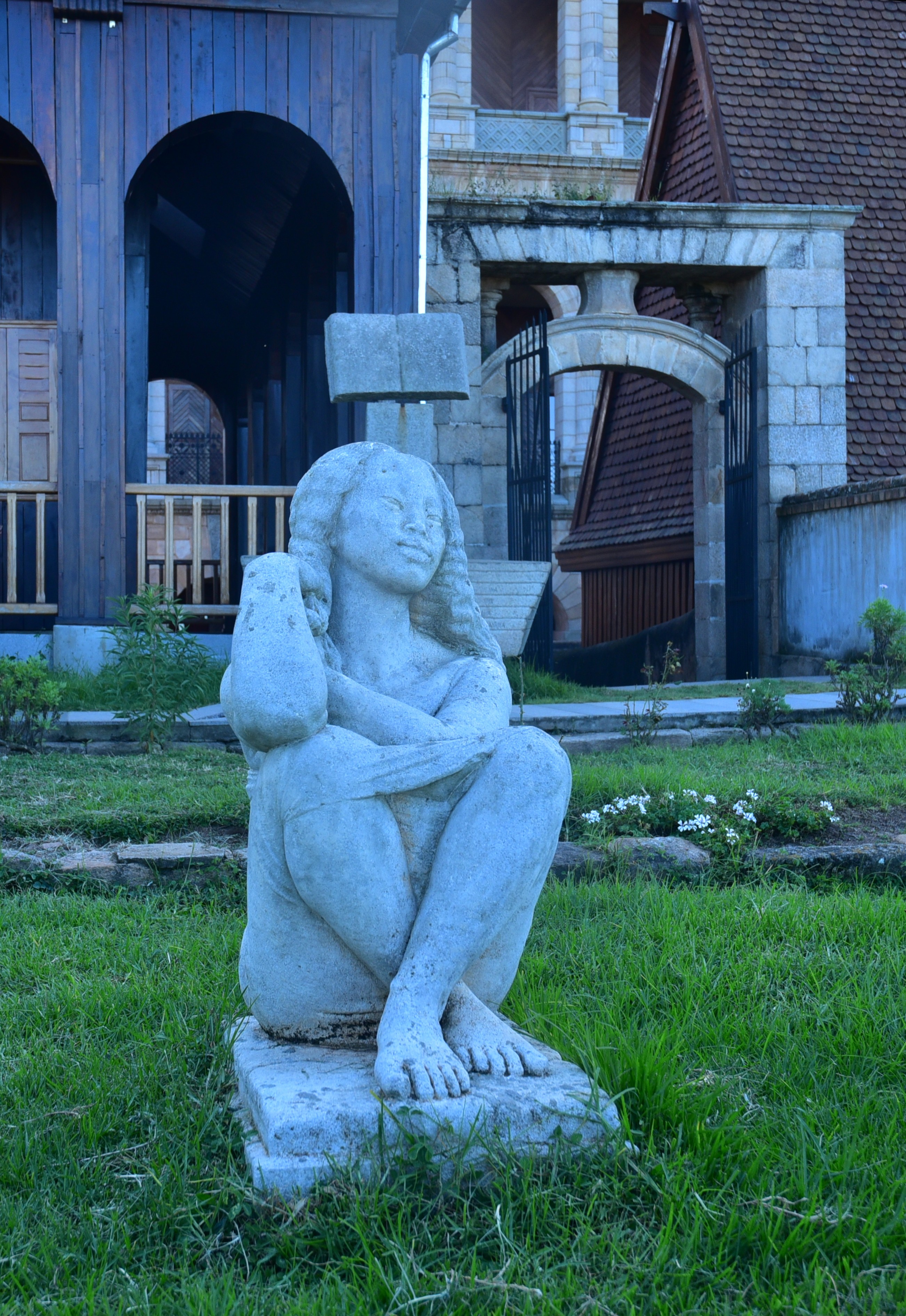
Statue of Rasalama Maritiora, garden of Manjakamiadana Palace, Madagascar

Rafaravavy Rasalama (c. 1810/1812 - 14 August 1837) was a Malagasy Christian martyr, the first from her country.

Rasalama was a pupil in one of the village schools which had been created in Madagascar by the London Missionary Society in 1824; she was likely one of the first to become a student. Her family later moved to Manjakaray, at which point she joined the community at Ambodin'Andohalo. In May 1831 she was baptized, becoming one of the first Malagasy to take the step; on June 5 of the same year she participated in the Lord's Supper at Ambatonakanga. Christianity was banned on the orders of Ranavalona I in 1835, and Rasalama went into hiding as a result; discovered living in a cave, in July 1837 she was arrested and enslaved. She remained patient despite maltreatment, but when she asserted a refusal to work on Sundays and reasserted her faith she provoked her master's anger. Rebelling against the will of the queen carried a sentence of death. Rasalama spent the night before her execution in irons; the following day she was taken to Ambohipotsy. She sang hymns and prayers on the way to her execution, a walk which has remained well-remembered. Dispatched by spears, she was left unburied.

== Memorials ==
Today the site of her martyrdom is marked by a memorial church. Rasalama's death impressed her fellow Malagasy deeply, and attracted notice from British Protestants as well. She is remembered with a memorial plaque in Brunswick Chapel in Bristol.

== Movie ==
The first movie made by a black African was a 1937 documentary short Rasalama maritiora (Rasalama) by Malagasy film director Philippe Raberojo (Raberono) on the occasion of the centenary of her martyrdom.
