= Ampefy =

- Location in Madagascar
- Coordinates: 19°02′31″S 46°43′58″E
- Country: Madagascar
- Region: Itasy
- District: Soavinandriana
- Elevation: 1,288 m (4,226 ft)

Population (2018)
  - Total: 19,949
  - Ethnicities: Merina
- Time zone: UTC3 (EAT)
- Postal code: 118

Ampefy is a municipality in Madagascar. It belongs to the district of Soavinandriana, which is a part of Itasy Region. The population of the commune was 19,949 in 2018.

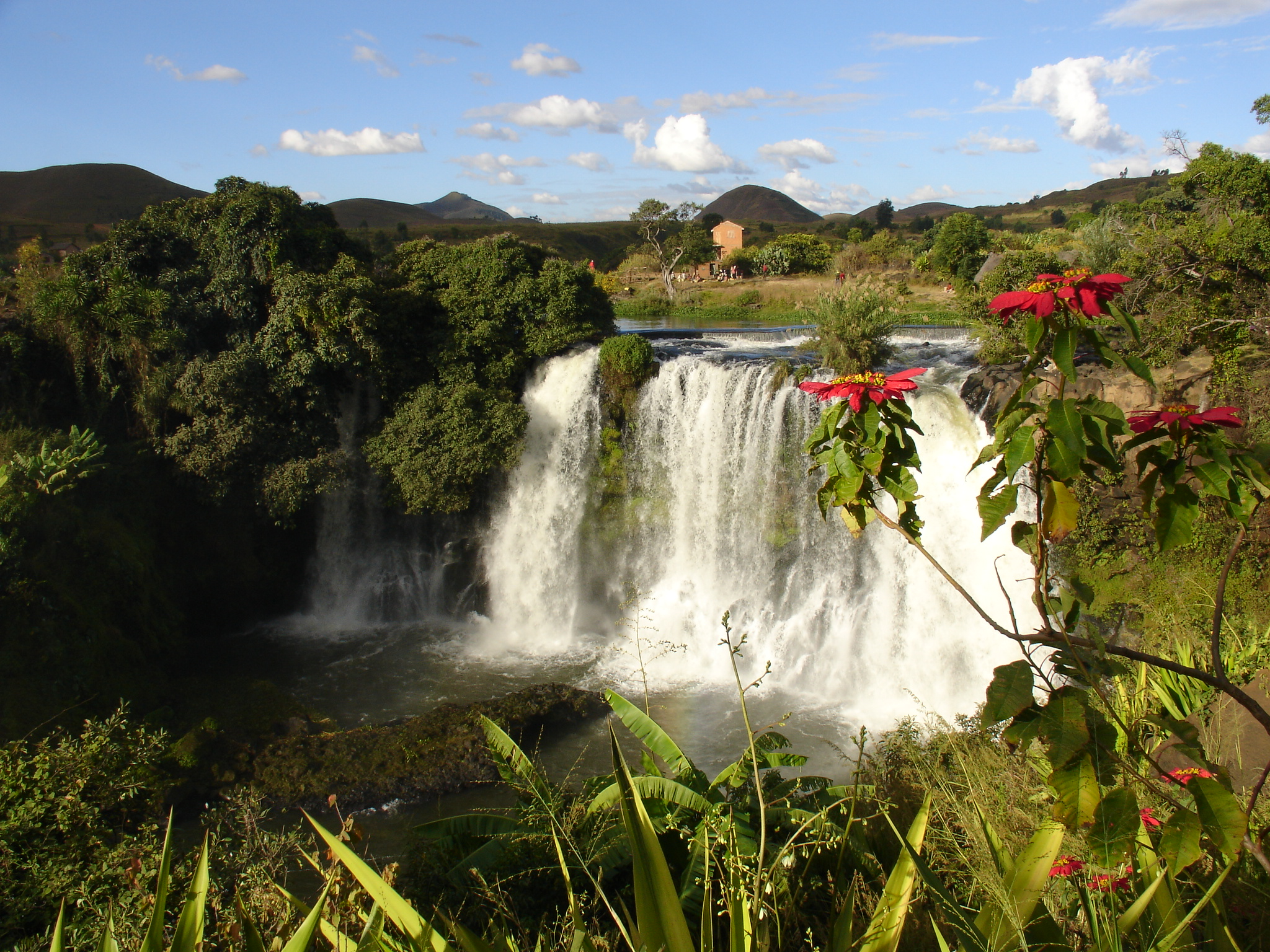
Lily waterfalls near Ampefy

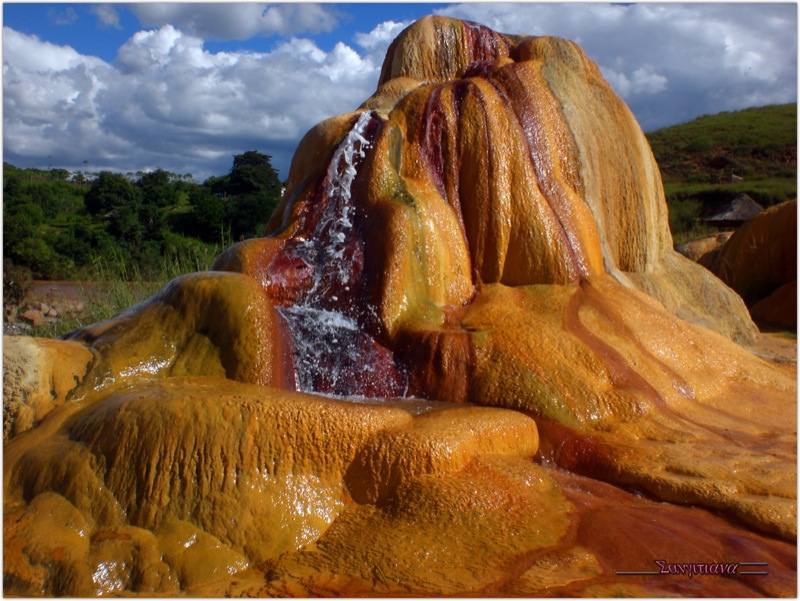
The Analavory geyser is a tourist attraction near Ampefy

Primary and junior level secondary education are available in town. The majority 91.5% of the population of the commune are farmers. The most important crops are beans and vegetables; also maize is an important agricultural product. Industry and services provide employment for 0.5% and 1% of the population, respectively. Additionally fishing employs 7% of the population.

== Roads ==
It is localized on the National Road 43.

== Rivers ==
The Lily River that forms also the Lily falls near Ampefy.

== Lakes ==
The Lake Itasy, the forth mayor lake of Madagascar, is partly situated in this municipality.
