= Belon'i Tsiribihina =

Belon'i Tsiribihina Belo sur Tsiribihina
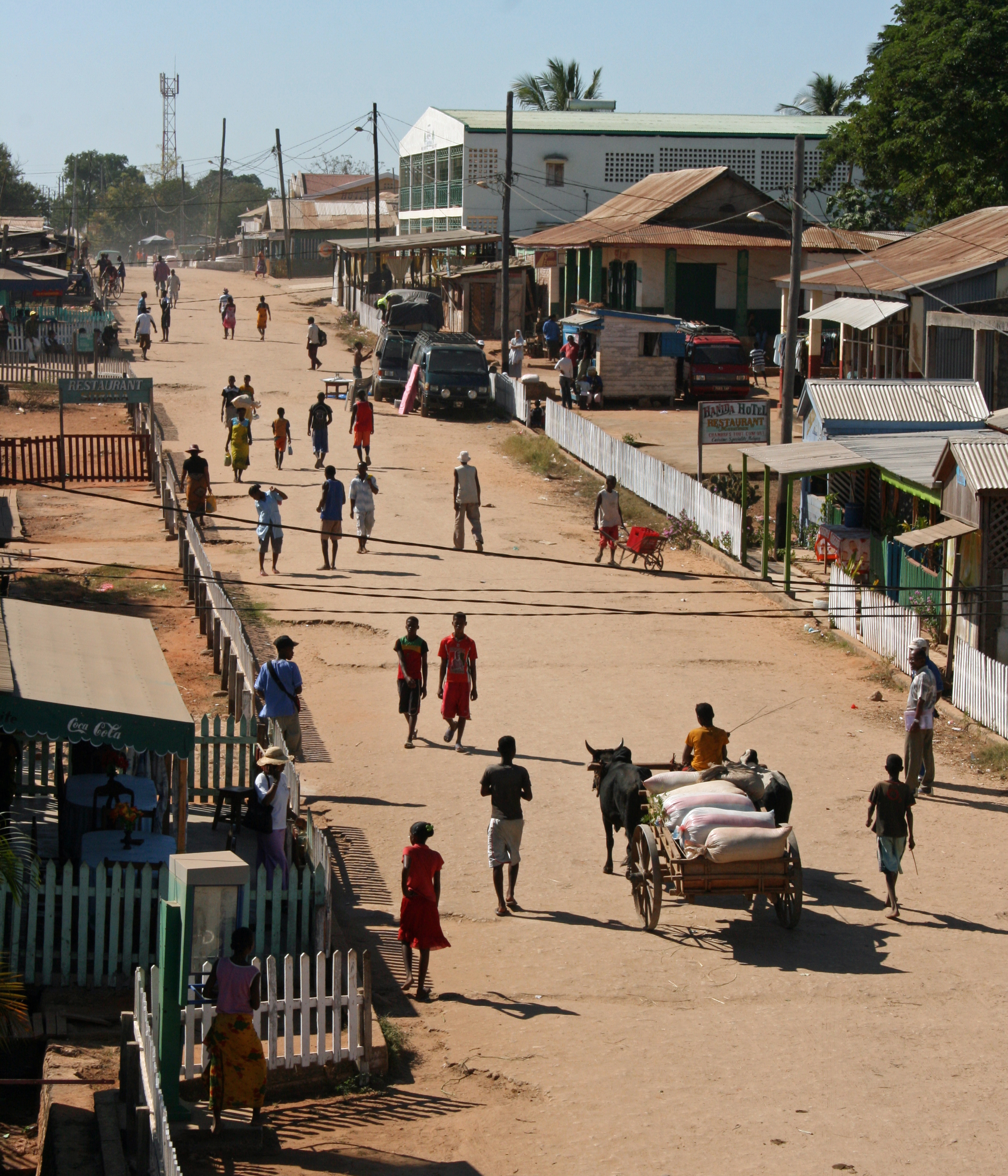

- Location in Madagascar
- Coordinates: 19°42′S 44°33′E
- Country: Madagascar
- Region: Menabe
- District: Belo sur Tsiribihina

Government
  - Mayor: Ratsimbalson Faharo

Area morondava-autrement.com
  - Total: 2,561 sq mi (6,633 km^{2})
  - Land: 2,561 sq mi (6,633 km^{2})
- Elevation: 56 ft (17 m)

Population (2001)
  - Total: 72,000
- Time zone: UTC3 (EAT)

Belo Tsiribihina (also known as Belo sur Tsiribihina or more commonly Belon'i Tsiribihina) is a town and commune (Malagasy: kaominina) in Madagascar. It belongs to the district of Belo sur Tsiribihina, which is a part of Menabe Region. It is situated at the mouth of the Tsiribihina River. The population of the commune was estimated to be approximately 72,000 in 2001 commune census.

Belon'i Tsiribihina is served by a local airport. In addition to primary schooling the town offers secondary education at both junior and senior levels. The town provides access to hospital services to its citizens.

The majority 60% of the population of the commune are farmers, while an additional 20% receives their livelihood from raising livestock. The most important crop is rice, while other important products are beans and chickpea. Services provide employment for 10% of the population. Additionally fishing employs 10% of the population.

== See also ==
- Tsingy de Bemaraha Strict Nature Reserve
- Madagascar dry deciduous forests
- Tsiribihina River

== Personalities ==
- Roger Kolo (*1943) - former prime minister of Madagascar (2014/15).
