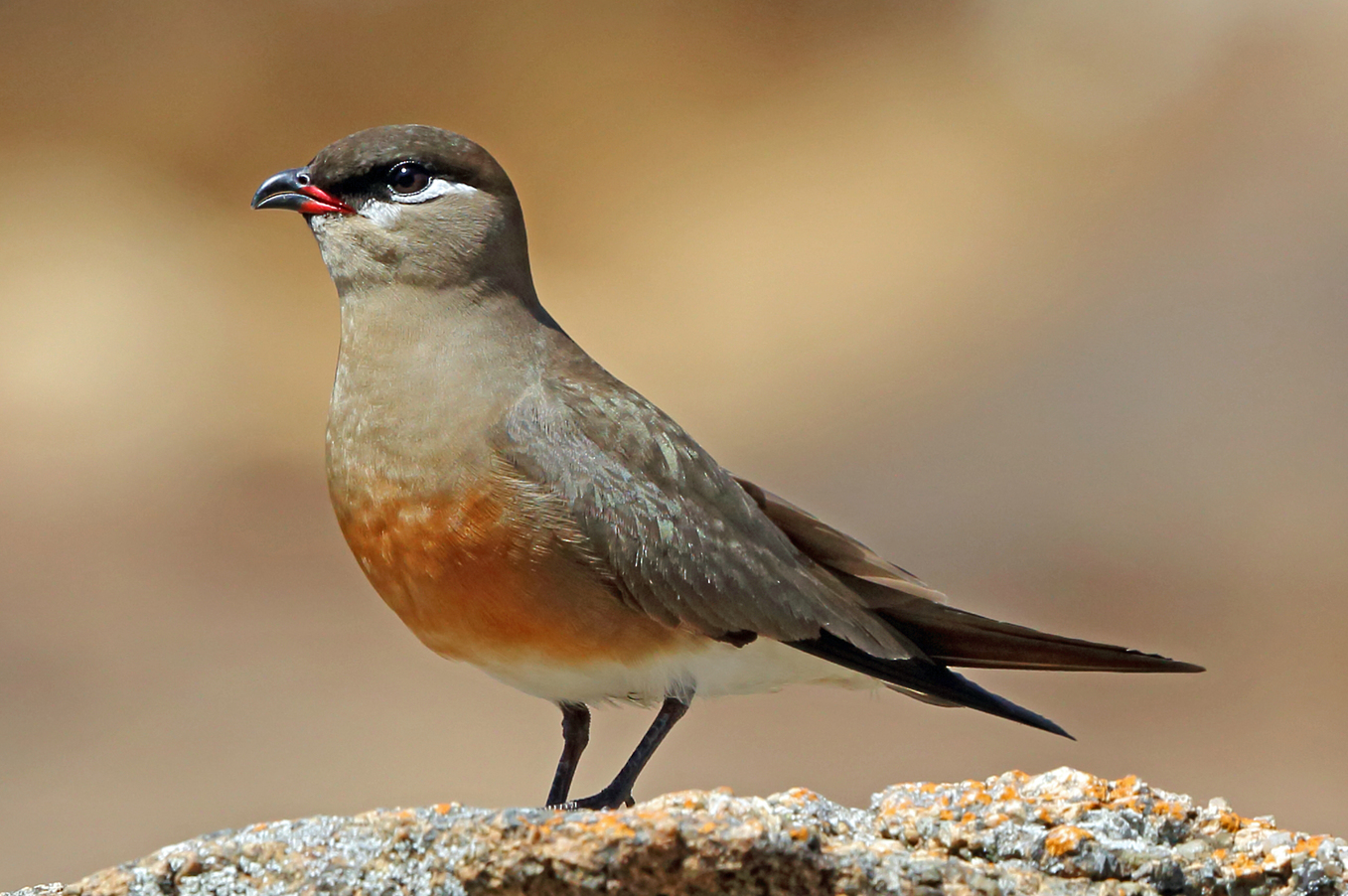

Conservation status
- Near Threatened (IUCN 3.1)

Scientific classification
- Kingdom: Animalia
- Phylum: Chordata
- Class: Aves
- Order: Charadriiformes
- Family: Glareolidae
- Genus: Glareola
- Species: G. ocularis

Binomial name
- Glareola ocularis Verreaux, 1833

= Madagascar pratincole =

Species of bird

The Madagascar pratincole (Glareola ocularis) is a species of bird in the family Glareolidae. It is a migratory species, breeding across Madagascar (except in the country’s extreme south-west) before migrating to East Africa during the austral winter (May-August), where it is mainly found near the coast between Somalia and Mozambique. Its natural habitats are subtropical or tropical seasonally wet or flooded lowland grassland, rivers, freshwater lakes, rocky shores, and intertidal marshes; as it migrates to the coast of East Africa. It is the rarest species in the Glareola genus, and is threatened by habitat loss.

Its breeding season lasts from October to December, peaking in November.
