= Toera =

King of Menabe

Toera or Itoera (died 30 August 1897) was a king of the Menabe kingdom of the Sakalava people in western Madagascar. He survived a succession challenge from his half brother Ingraza and attempted to take a moderate approach to the French colonisation of Madagascar. Toera was driven into rebellion against the French after their abolition of slavery threatened his people's participation in the slave trade. He raised an army to fight France but was defeated and killed by an expedition led by Augustin Gérard. Toera's presumed skull was taken to Paris and held in the collection of the National Museum of Natural History until August 2025 when it was returned to the Madagascan government.

== Life and rule ==
British Christian missionary George Herbert Smith, writing in 1896, noted that Toera was the son of the preceding Menabe king and a princess. His reign was threatened at times by his half-brother Ingereza; Smith noted that Ingereza was the son of a non-royal woman but had been born within the royal enclosure while Toera, although of royal blood, was born outside of the enclosure. In the ensuing conflict at one stage Toera was almost forced to submit to his brother after Ingereza's interruption of the kingdom's riverine trade routes led to starvation but by 1896 the majority of the Menabe subjects supported Toera.

The Franco-Hova Wars of 1883–1895 led to the establishment of a French protectorate over the island. Continued Malagasy resistance led to the civil government of the protectorate being replaced by a military governor, Joseph Gallieni. He deposed Queen Ranavalona III in early 1897 and ordered expeditions against the rebels. Toera had attempted to pursue a moderate approach to the French, though some of his subordinates favoured rebellion. Toera sought to enter discussions with the French authorities but following the French abolition of slavery, which threatened his subjects' participation in the slave trade, he began to associate with Rainibetsimisaraka, a leader of the Menalamba rebellion. After the French victory over the menalamba rebels by July 1897 Toera became possibly the most powerful of the rebel leaders.

Gallieni ordered a sub-ordinate, Augustin Gérard, to lead an expedition against the Sakalava people who he described as "war-like, thieving and very jealous of their independence". French accounts allege deception on the part of Toera, stating that he continued peace negotiations whilst assembling a large force of troops, some armed with rifles, under his general, Mahatanty, and continuing to launch attacks on the French column while discussing peace. Menabe accounts have Gérard as the deceiver, for continuing to entertain the possibility of peace whilst advancing on the Menabe capital of Ambiky.

Mahatanty's troops were defeated by Gérard at Anosymena on 14 August. Gérard attacked Ambiky on 30 August; after a short artillery bombardment six French detachments took the settlement and killed Toera, his chief minister and a senior chief, Vongovongo. Three other chiefs were captured alongside 500 Sakalava. The French losses amounted to two Senegalese tirailleurs killed. After the attack the Menabe rose in rebellion and Gallieni reprimanded Gérard for his actions, which led to a 7-year campaign to establish a pro-French ruler in Menabe.

== Repatriation ==
After Toera's death his head was removed and taken to Paris where it was placed in the collection of the National Museum of Natural History. Pressure from Toera's descendants and the government of Madagascar led to France agreeing to repatriate the skull. DNA tests failed to definitively prove that the skull belonged to Toera but the identification was accepted by Madagascar after a traditional Sakalava spirit medium examined the skull and declared it was the king's.

The skull was handed into Madagascan custody alongside two other Sakalava skulls on 26 August 2025. They were returned to Madagascar on 1 September and received at the Mausoleum of Avaratr’Ambohitsaina in Antananarivo the next day in a formal ceremony attended by president Andry Rajoelina. Toera's great-grandson, the Sakalava king Georges Harea Kamamy, expressed relief at the repatriation, along with regret that the skulls were placed in the custody of the Malagasy government rather than the royal family. The skull is expected to be attached with the rest of Toera's skeleton in Ambiky in a burial ceremony scheduled later in the week.

== See also ==
- Sakalava empire – Polity covering the west coast of Madagscar
