= Route nationale 15 (Madagascar) =

Road in Madagascar

Location
- Country: Madagascar

Highway system
- Roads in Madagascar

Route nationale 15 (RN15) is a secondary, unpaved highway in Madagascar. The route runs from Beroroha to Sakaraha where it makes junction with the (National Road 7). It covers a distance of 232 km and is hardly practicable.

== Selected locations on route (from north to south) ==
- Beroroha
- Ankazoabo
- Sakaraha - (National Road 7)
