= Mahajilo River =

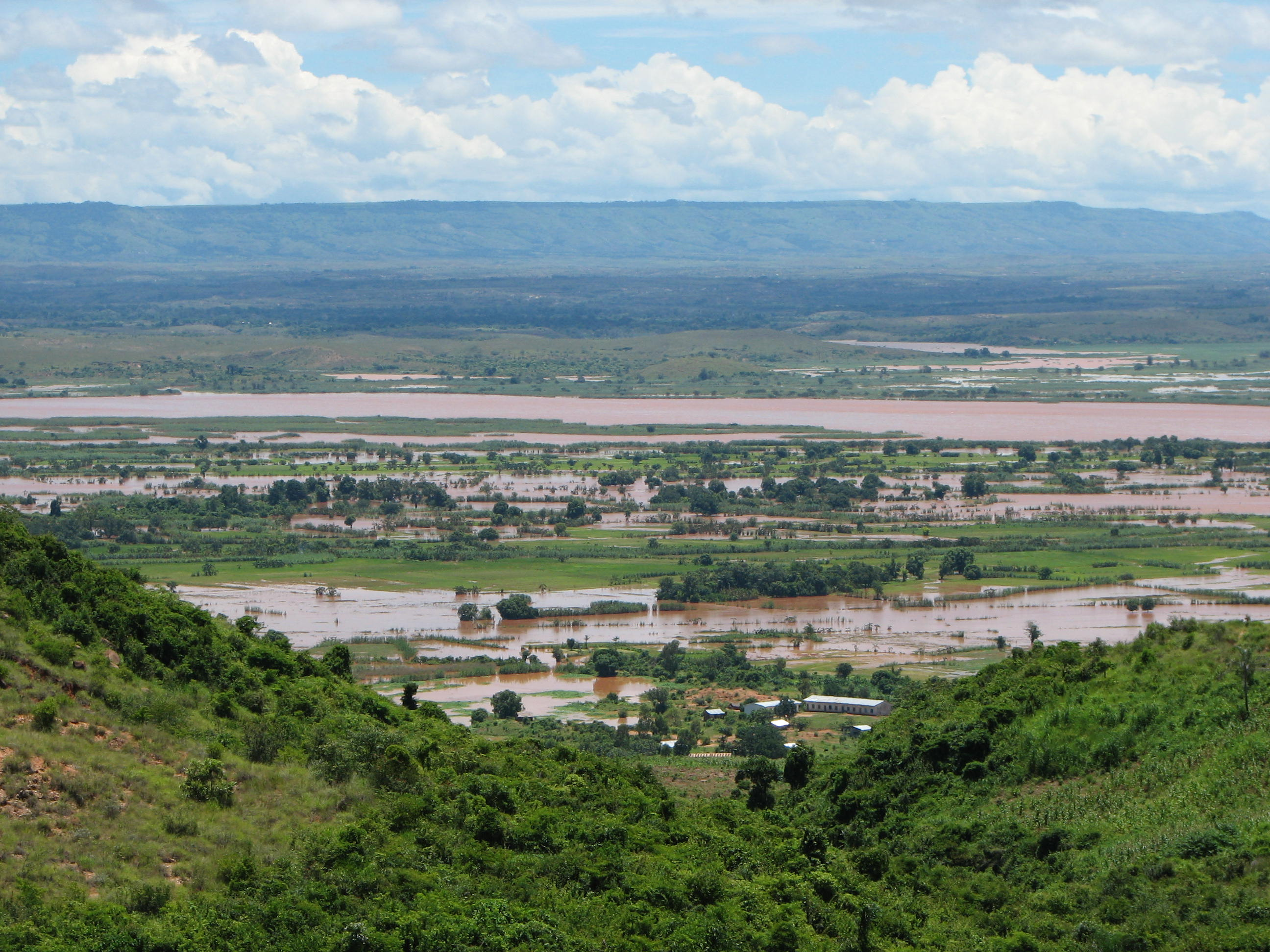

- Map of Malagasy rivers (Mahajilo flows from the central highlands to the Tsiribihina River).

Location
- Country: Madagascar
- City: Miandrivazo

Physical characteristics
- Source: Sakay River and Kitsamby
- Mouth
  - location: Tsiribihina River, Menabe
  - coordinates: 19°41′00″S 45°22′23″E
- Length: 260 km (160 mi)
- Basin size: 14,375 km^{2} (5,550 sq mi)
- Discharge
  - location: Tsiribihina Riverat Miandrivazo
  - average: 517 m^{3}/s (18,300 cu ft/s)at Miandrivazo
  - minimum: 53.2 m^{3}/s (1,880 cu ft/s)
  - maximum: 1,530 m^{3}/s (54,000 cu ft/s)January

Basin features
- River system: Tsiribihina River

Mahajilo is a river in Menabe, western Madagascar. It is formed by the affluents of the Sakay river and Kitsamby river. It flows down from the central highlands, to flow into the Tsiribihina River.

Rafting trips are purposed by several operators on this river from Miandrivazo.
