= Mania River =

River in Madagascar

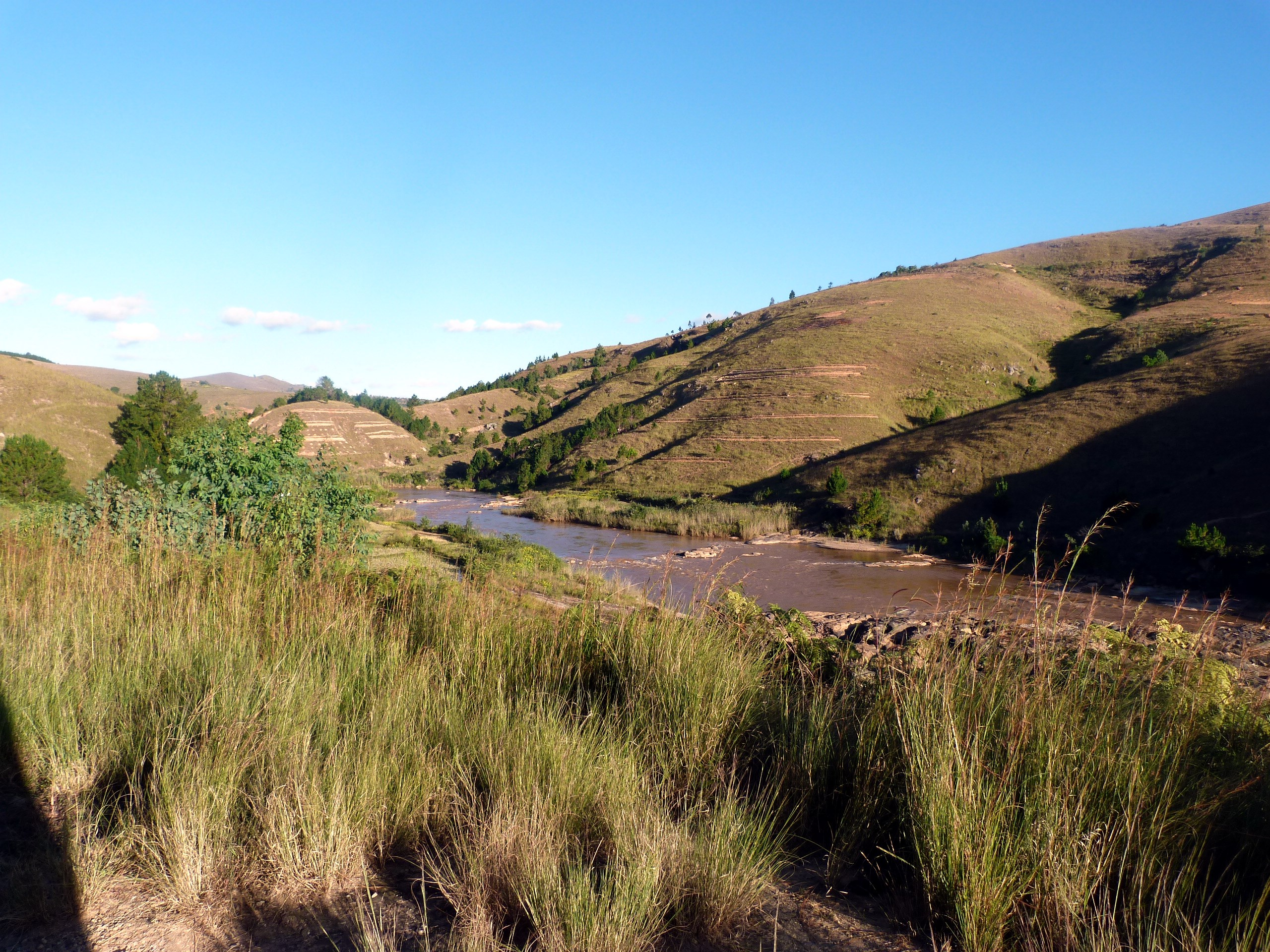
- Mania River south of Antsirabe

Location
- Country: Madagascar
- Region: Vakinankaratra, Menabe, Amoron'i Mania

Physical characteristics
- Source: Fasina
  - location: Fasina
  - elevation: 1,654 m (5,427 ft)
- Mouth: Tsiribihina River
  - location: Ankazondringitra, Menabe
  - coordinates: 19°48′00″S 45°27′30″E
  - elevation: 71 m (233 ft)
- Length: 0.0 km (0 mi)
- Basin size: 7,100 km^{2} (2,700 sq mi)
- Discharge
  - average: 165 m3/s

The Mania River is a river in Madagascar that flows from the central mountains of the island, emptying into the Mozambique Channel. The region of Amoron'i Mania is named from this river.

Main tributaries from the left are the Ivato, Imorona, Ikoly, Menala, and Sakeny rivers, and on its right the Fitanamaria, Sakorendrika, Manandona river, Isakely and Iandratsay rivers.

There is an ongoing project of a hydroelectric power station on the Mania River, near the site of Antetezambato.
