= Manambolo River =

River in Madagascar

Manambolo
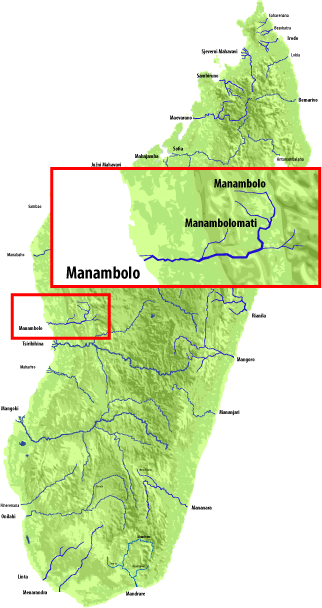

Location
- Country: Madagascar
- Region: Melaky, Bongolava

Physical characteristics
- Mouth: Indian Ocean
  - location: Soahazo,
  - coordinates: 19°15′10″S 44°20′00″E
  - elevation: 0 m (0 ft)
- Length: 370 km (230 mi)

Basin features
- Tributaries
  - left: Itondy River
  - right: Bepoaka, Bebao, Andranobe, Manambolomaty,

For the rural municipality, see Manambolo (disambiguation)

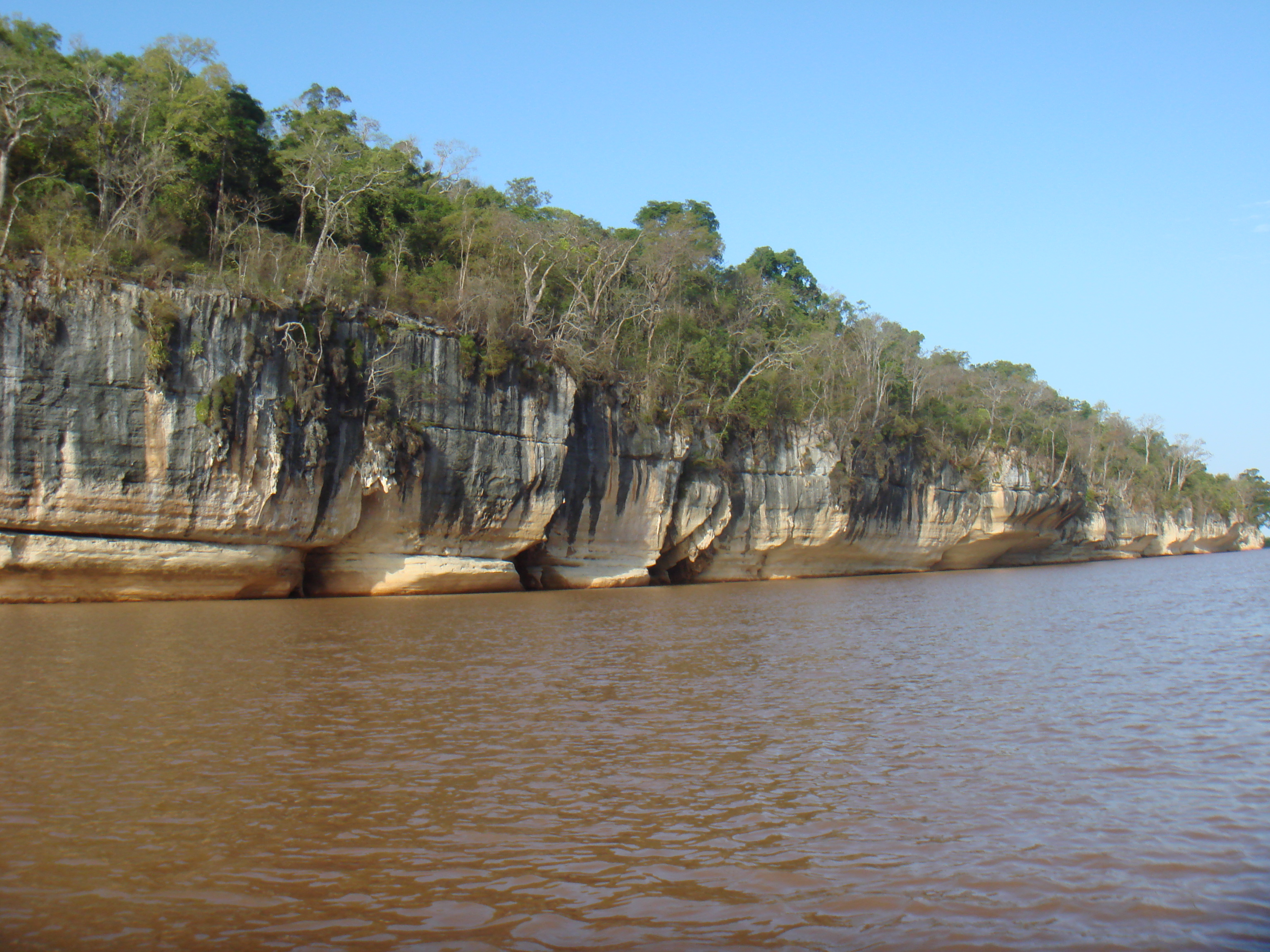
Manambolo River

The Manambolo River is a river in the highlands of western Madagascar of 370 km. It crosses the Tsingy de Bemaraha Strict Nature Reserve and the Maningoza Reserve.

Manambolo river Bassin

The unpaved Route nationale 8 (Madagascar) crosses this river by ferry.

This river flows through Tsiroanomandidy, Bekopaka, Ambakaka, Ankaramena, Ankavandra and Soaloka.
