= Tsiribihina River =

Tsiribihina
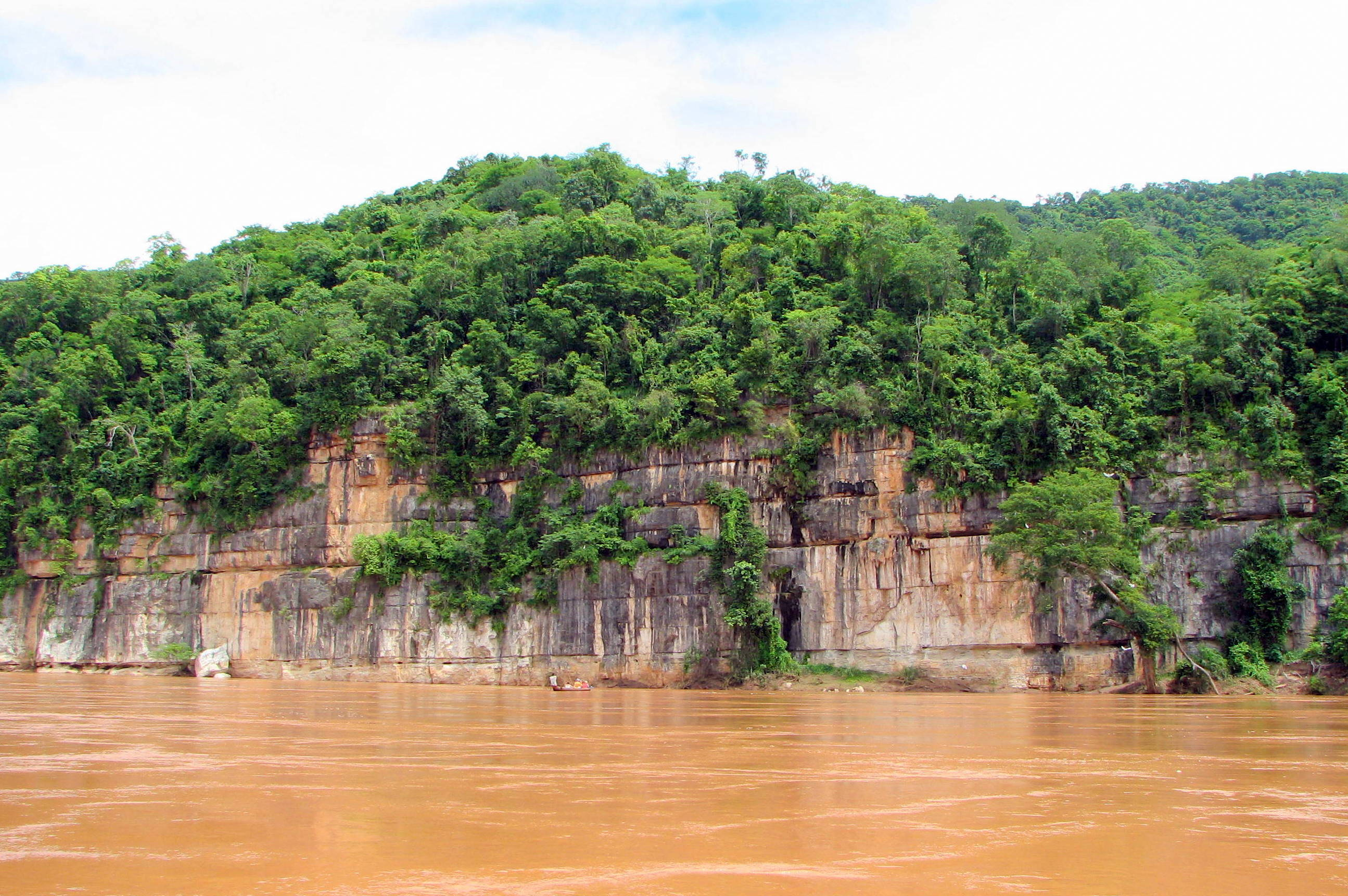

- The basin of the Tsiribihina

Location
- Country: Madagascar
- Region: Bongolava, Menabe, Melaky

Physical characteristics
- Source
  - location: Confluence of Mahajilo and Mania
  - elevation: 49 m (161 ft)
- Mouth: Belon'i Tsiribihina, Indian Ocean
  - coordinates: 19°42′S 44°33′E
  - elevation: 0 m (0 ft)
- Length: 150 km (93 mi)
- Basin size: 49,800 km^{2} (19,200 mi^{2})
- Discharge
  - location: Tsiribihina Delta
  - average: (Period: 1971–2000)1,027.2 m^{3}/s (36,280 cu ft/s)

Basin features
- River system: Tsiribihina River
- Tributaries
  - left: Mahajilo, Andranomeno
  - right: Mania

Designations

Ramsar Wetland
- Official name: Mangroves de Tsiribihina
- Designated: 22 May 2017
- Reference no.: 2302

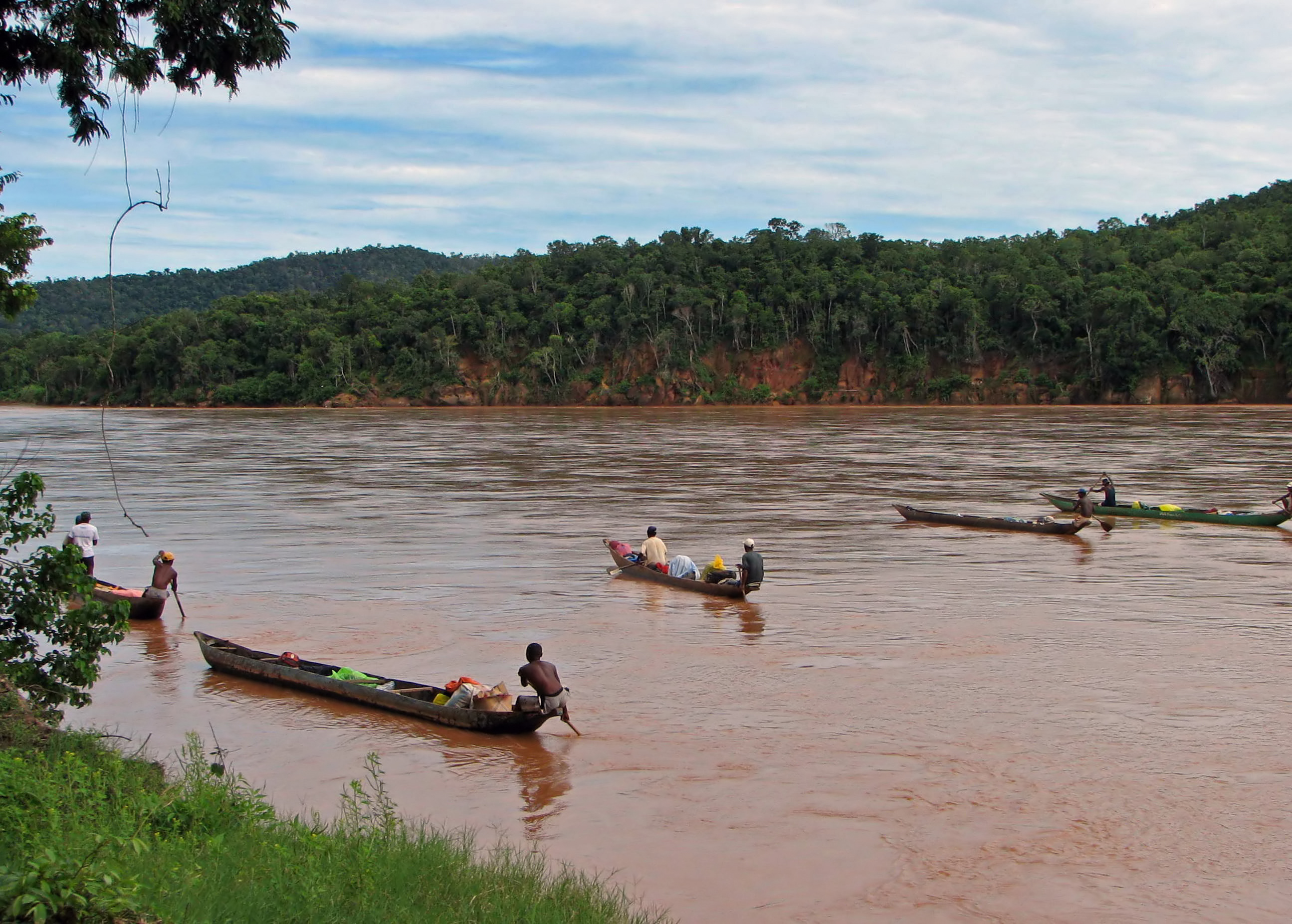
Pirogues on Tsiribihina river

The Tsiribihina is a river of western Madagascar. Its basin has an area of 49,800 square kilometres (19,200 mi^{2}), and with a mean annual discharge of around 32 cubic kilometres (7.7 mi^{3}) it is the largest river in Madagascar by volume.

The main tributaries are the Mahajilo, Manandaza, Mania, and Sakeny rivers. 7,025 square kilometres (2,712 mi^{2}) is in the basin of the Sakeny River, 14,500 square kilometres (5,600 mi^{2}) in that of the Mahajilo River, and 18,565 square kilometres (7,168 mi^{2}) in that of the Mania River.

The headwaters are on Madagascar's Central Highlands. The tributary streams flow generally westwards except for the Sakeny, which flows northwards. As they leave the highlands and enter the north–south running Betsiriry Plain, the tributary rivers converge to form the Tsiribihina – the Mahajilo and Manandaza from the north, and the Mania and Sakeny from the south. There are extensive seasonal wetlands and shallow lakes where the rivers converge on the plain. The rich alluvial soils of the Betsiriry Plain make it one of the most suitable regions for agriculture in western Madagascar. The plain's wetlands and lakes are important habitat for waterbirds.

The Tsiribihina then flows westward, cutting a steep and winding gorge through the Bemaraha Plateau, a limestone formation that extends north and south along the western edge of the Betsiriry Plain. As the river emerges from the Bemaraha Plateau it widens and meanders. There are several shallow lakes along the lower course, including Lake Kimanomby near Ambohibary and Lake Masoarivo near Masoarivo.

The river delta is large, extending about 35 kilometres (22 mi) north to south. It includes coastal beaches and dunes, mudflats, salt flats, mangroves, and freshwater marshes. The mangroves are generally 2–4 metres (6.6–13.1 ft) high, and the predominant trees are species of Avicennia, Rhizophora, Ceriops, Bruguiera, and Sonneratia. The salt flats often flood during the rainy season. The freshwater marshes and lakes of the lower Tsiribihina are dominated by the sedges Cyperus spp, the reed Phragmites, and non-native water-hyacinth Eichhornia. The mouth of the river is near Belon'i Tsiribihina, where it empties into the Mozambique Channel.

82 species of birds have been recorded from the Tsiribihina River and its delta, 22 of which are endemic to Madagascar. Bernier's teal (Anas bernieri) breeds in the mangroves. The Madagascar pratincole (Glareola ocularis) congregates in large numbers on the banks of the river, and one of Madagascar's largest congregations of the Madagascar subspecies of white-backed duck (Thalassornis leuconotus insularis) occurs at Lake Masoarivo. A few pairs of Madagascar fish eagle (Haliaeetus vociferoides) live along the river.

The Menabe Antimena protected area covers the south bank of the lower Tsiribihina along with the delta and mangroves. The Tsiribihina Delta is designated a wetland of international importance under the Ramsar Convention, and the Tsiribihina River and its delta are designated an Important Bird Area by Birdlife International.
