= Menabe =

- Region
- Location in Madagascar
- Coordinates: 20°18′00″S 44°16′48″E
- Country: Madagascar
- Capital: Morondava

Government
  - Chief: Romain Gilbert

Area
  - Total: 46,121 km^{2} (17,807 sq mi)

Population (2018)
  - Total: 700,577
  - Density: 15.190/km^{2} (39.342/sq mi)
  - Ethnicities: Sakalava
- Time zone: UTC3 (EAT)
- HDI (2018): 0.450 low · 17th of 22

Menabe is a region in western Madagascar, with its capital at Morondava. It covers an area of 46,121 square kilometres (17,807 square miles), and its population was 700,577 in 2018. The population mostly belongs to the Sakalava ethnic group. The region is named after the 18th-century Sakalava Kingdom of Menabe (16th–18th centuries). The name "Menabe", in turn, means "big red", after the color of laterite rock that dominates the landscape.

== History ==
Menabe is the southern part of the Sakalava territory. Tradition holds that it was founded by Adriamandazoala (reigned c. 1540 – 1560). Its territory was increased under the legendary Andriandahifotsy (c. 1610 – 1685). It thus became the strongest kingdom in Madagascar until the mid-18th century. Among its most famous rulers was Ranaimo or Andriandrainarivo (ruled 1718–1727) who is known through the memoirs of Europeans such as Robert Drury, James Cook, the crew of the Dutch East Indiaman Barneveld, 1719, François Valentijn (1726). Though handsome and imposing, he was a paralytic.

Radama I would conduct three ravaging campaigns in the kingdom of Menabe in 1820, in 1821 and finally in 1822. Finally, Ramitraho, king of Menabe at the time, sued for peace by giving his daughter Rasalimo to Radama as his wife. But peace would not follow until Rasalimo offered another peace treaty in 1827. Unfortunately Radama died before negotiations could finish.

Eventually the Merina conquered and subjugated the southern Menabe territories in 1834 right after Ramitraho's death. Constant war would ensue culminating with a Merina victory in 1846. Queen Ranavalona I then garrisoned major Menabe towns and sent farmers to colonize the area. Menabe rulers were allowed to keep their authority but under the local Merina governor. The northern Menabe largely escaped Merina authority and stayed independent despite the fact that they no longer posed any threat to the monarchy in Antananarivo.

During the French invasion of Madagascar the Menabe kings united their forces. On August 14, 1897 and August 30, 1897 the 100 Menabe chiefs with 10,000 warriors armed with rifles met the French troops in Anosimena and Ambiky. King Itoera was killed along with his generals and many of his nobles, but the Menabe was not pacified until the year 1900.

Menabe was then incorporated into the province of Toliara under the French colonization which ended in 1960. In 2004 it became a Region.

== Geography ==
The Menabe region is situated between the Mangoky and Manambolo Rivers.

=== Rivers ===
- Mangoky
- Manambolo River
- Morondava River
- Tsiribihina River
- Sakeny River
- Mahajilo River

== Tourism ==
The Avenue of the Baobabs is one of the most visited locations in the region.

== Transport ==
It is connected with the inland by the Route nationale No.35 to Ivato, Route nationale No.34 to Antsirabe and is crossed by the Route nationale No.8 to Bekopaka.

=== Airports ===
- Ankavandra Airport
- Belo/Tsiribihina Airport
- Malaimbandy Airport
- Mandabe Airport
- Manja Airport
- Miandrivazo Airport
- Morondava Airport

== Protected Areas ==
- Part of Mangoky Ihotry Wetland Complex
- Ambondrobe New Protected Area
- Avenue of the Baobabs New Protected Area
- Menabe Antimena New Protected Area
- Part of the Ambohijanahary Reserve
- Kirindy Mitea National Park
- Andranomena Reserve

are situated in this region.

== Administrative divisions ==
Menabe Region is divided into five districts, which are sub-divided into 51 communes:

- Belo sur Tsiribihina District – 14 communes
- Mahabo District – 11 communes
- Manja District – 6 communes
- Miandrivazo District – 15 communes
- Morondava District – 5 communes
