= Morondava District =

- District
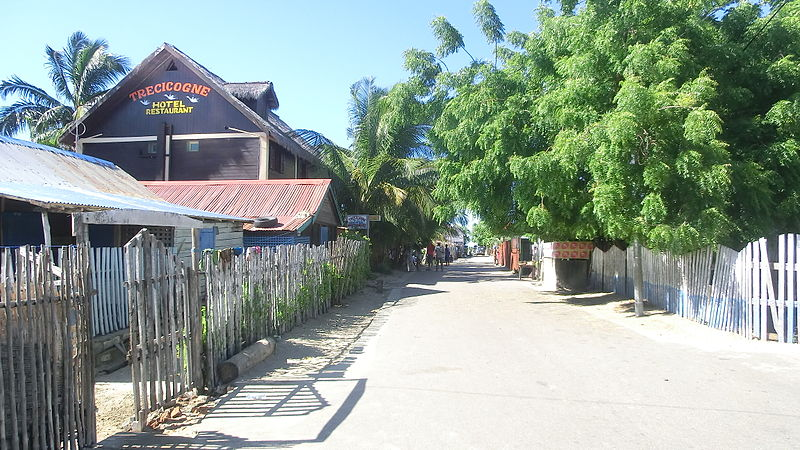
- Morondava

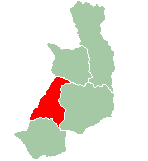
- Location in Menabe region
- Coordinates: 20°31′S 44°22′E
- Country: Madagascar
- Region: Menabe
- Capital: Morondava

Area
  - Total: 5,691 km^{2} (2,197 sq mi)

Population (2020)
  - Total: 157,596
  - Density: 27.69/km^{2} (71.72/sq mi)
- Time zone: UTC3 (EAT)
- Postal code: 619

Morondava District is a district in the Menabe region in eastern Madagascar. Its capital is Morondava. The district has an area of 5,691 km^{2} (2,197 sq mi), and the estimated population in 2020 was 157,596.

== Municipalities ==
The district is further divided into six municipalities:

- Analaiva
- Befasy
- Belo sur Mer
- Bemanonga
- Marofandilia
- Morondava

== Roads ==
- RN 34 to Ivato, Ambositra and Antsirabe.
- RN 8 to Belo-sur-Tsiribihina.

== Airports ==
- Morondava Airport

== Rivers ==
- Morondava River

== Nature ==
- Tsingy de Bemaraha Strict Nature Reserve
- Andranomena Reserve
- Kirindy Forest
- Avenue of the Baobabs, 20 km north of Morondava.

== Religion ==
- Roman Catholic Diocese (Cathedral of Mary Queen of the World).
- Fiangonana Jesosy Mamonjy Morondava
- FJKM - Fiangonan'i Jesoa Kristy eto Madagasikara (Church of Jesus Christ in Madagascar)

== See also ==
- Betania, a beach village in Morondava district.
