= Mahabo District =

Mahabo district
- district
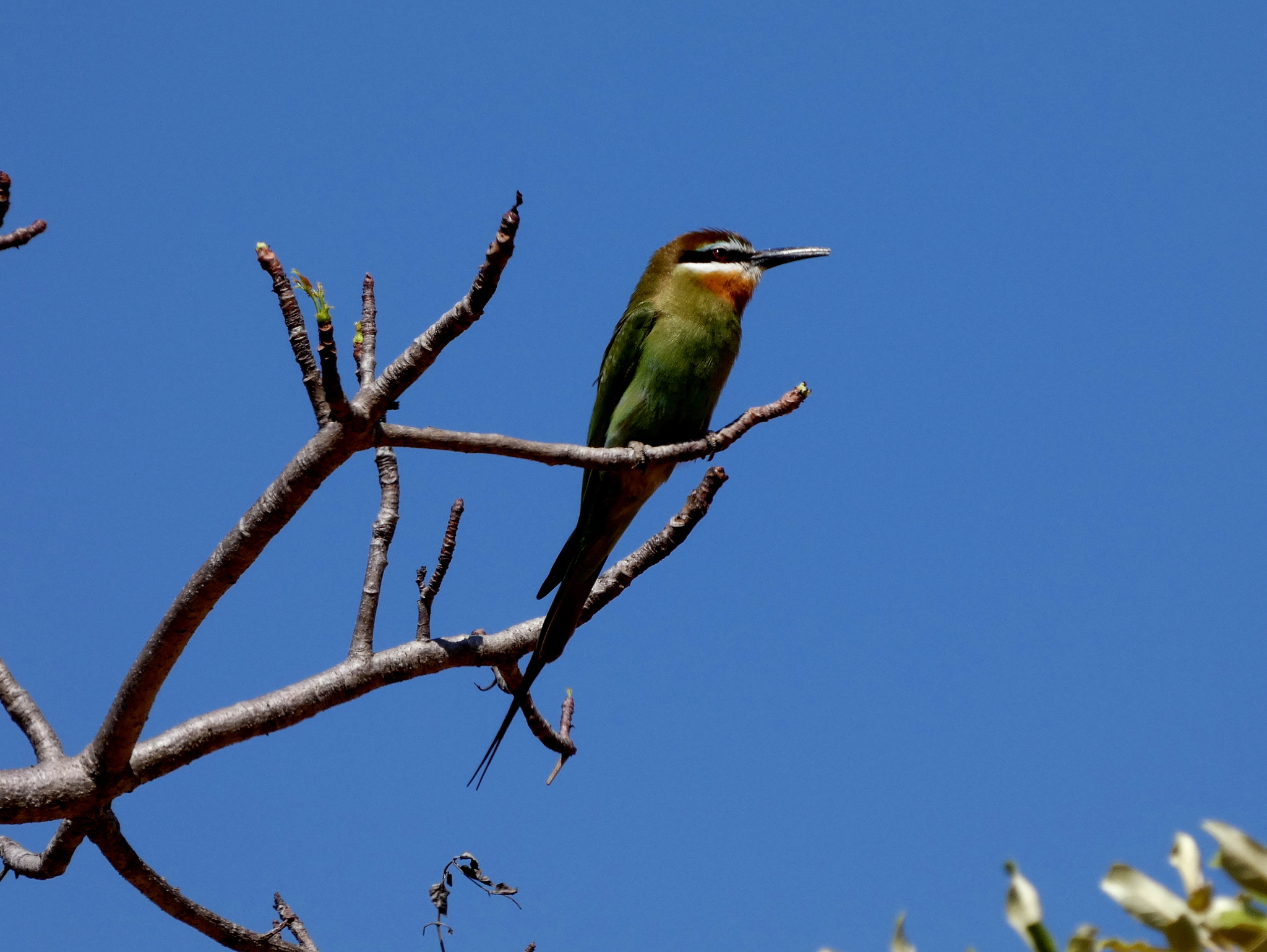

- Location within Madagascar
- Coordinates: 20°23′S 44°40′E
- Country: Madagascar
- Region: Menabe

Government
  - Mayor (interim): Désiré Armand Raharison

Area
  - Total: 13,716 km^{2} (5,296 sq mi)
- Elevation: 123 m (404 ft)

Population (2020)
  - Total: 157,104
  - Density: 11.454/km^{2} (29.666/sq mi)
- postal code: 615

Mahabo is a district of Menabe in Madagascar. The district has an area of 13,716 km^{2} (5,296 sq mi), and the estimated population in 2020 was 157,104.

== Communes ==
The district is further divided into 11 communes:

- Ambia
- Ampanihy
- Analamitsivala
- Ankilivalo
- Ankilizato
- Befotaka
- Beronono
- Mahabo
- Malaimbandy
- Mandabe
- Tsimazava

== Geography ==
This district lies on the National road 35 from Morondava to Ivato

== Rivers ==
The Morondava River.
