= Mandrosonoro =

- Location in Madagascar
- Coordinates: 20°35′S 46°0′E
- Country: Madagascar
- Region: Amoron'i Mania
- District: Ambatofinandrahana
- Elevation: 924 m (3,031 ft)

Population (2001)
  - Total: 16,000
- Time zone: UTC3 (EAT)

Mandrosonoro is a town and commune in Madagascar. It belongs to the district of Ambatofinandrahana, which is a part of Amoron'i Mania Region. The population of the commune was estimated to be approximately 16,000 in 2001 commune census.

Primary and junior level secondary education are available in town. The majority 90% of the population of the commune are farmers, while an additional 5% receives their livelihood from raising livestock. The most important crops are rice and peanuts, while other important agricultural products are beans, maize and cassava. Services provide employment for 5% of the population.

== Geography ==
This town lies at the Route nationale 35 from Morondava to Ivato in the West of Madagascar. It is at a distance of 208 km (129 mi) to Ivato, Ambositra, 248 km (154 mi) to Morondava, 149 km (92.5 mi) to Ankilizato, Mahabo and 72 km (44 mi) from Malaimbandy.
