= Bemanonga =

- Location in Madagascar
- Coordinates: 20°17′S 44°21′E
- Country: Madagascar
- Region: Menabe
- District: Morondava

Government
  - Mayor: Roberto Miadamana
- Elevation: 10 m (33 ft)

Population (2001)
  - Total: 22,000
- Time zone: UTC3 (EAT)
- Postal code: 619

Bemanonga is a rural municipality in Madagascar. It belongs to the district of Morondava, which is a part of Menabe Region. The population of the commune was estimated to be approximately 22,000 in 2001 commune census.

Primary and junior level secondary education are available in town. The majority 52% of the population of the commune are farmers, while an additional 8% receives their livelihood from raising livestock. The most important crop is rice, while other important products are peanuts and lima beans. Industry and services provide employment for 7% and 3% of the population, respectively. Additionally fishing employs 30% of the population.

== Infrastructure ==
The municipality hosts the Kimony Solar Hybride Central power station.

== Geography ==
Bemanonga is a suburb of Morondava and is situated at 12 km distance only alongside the National road 35. It hosts the Morondava Airport.

== National Parks ==
The Andranomena Special Reserve and the Menabe Antimena New Protected Area are situated in the territory of the municipality of Bemanonga.
