= Malaimbandy =

- Location in Madagascar
- Coordinates: 20°20′S 45°36′E
- Country: Madagascar
- Region: Menabe
- District: Mahabo
- Elevation: 140 m (460 ft)

Population (2001)
  - Total: 26,000
- Time zone: UTC3 (EAT)
- Postal code: 615

Malaimbandy is a municipality in Madagascar. It belongs to the district of Mahabo, which is a part of Menabe Region. The population of the commune was estimated to be approximately 26,000 in 2001 commune census.

Malaimbandy is just served by a local airport. Primary and junior level secondary education are available in town. The majority 70% of the population of the commune are farmers, while an additional 30% receives their livelihood from raising livestock. The most important crop is rice, while other important products are cassava and tobacco.

== Geography ==
This town lies at the intersection of the Route nationale 35 from Morondava to Ivato, Ambositra and the Route nationale 34 to Miandrivazo.

It is located at a distance of 280 km to Ivato, Ambositra, 176 km to Morondava, 77 km to Ankilizato, Mahabo and 72 km from Mandrosonoro. This municipality is located at the Sakeny River.

== History ==
Malaimbady, which translates as "the one who doesn't tolerate lies," was once part of the Sakalava kingdom of Menabe. Radama I succeeded in subduing the region on 13th June 1822, after his victory over the Sakalava ruler, Ramitraho, at Mahabo. Back in Antananarivo, Radama, infatuated with Ramitraho's daughter, sent messengers to persuade the princess to come. However, she, suspecting a trick, replied: "Malaim-bandy," meaning "I fear it may be a lie."
