= Ambatofinandrahana District =

District in Madagascar

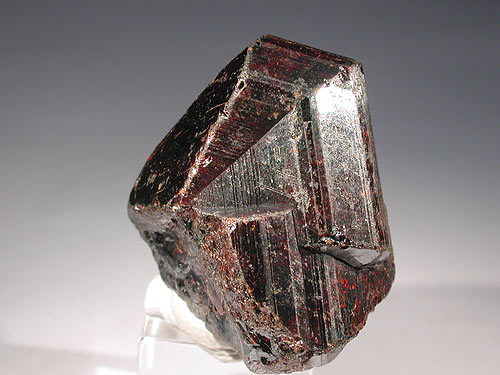
- Minerals in Ambatofinandrahana

- Location in Madagascar
- Coordinates: 20°33′0″S 46°48′0″E
- Country: Madagascar
- Region: Amoron'i Mania

Area
  - Total: 10,321 km^{2} (3,985 sq mi)

Population (2020)
  - Total: 237,262
  - Density: 22.988/km^{2} (59.539/sq mi)
- Postal code: 304
- Climate: Cwb

Ambatofinandrahana District is a district in central Madagascar. It is part of Amoron'i Mania Region. It covers an area of 10,321.48 km^{2}, and in 2020 its population was estimated at 237,262. Its capital is Ambatofinandrahana.

== Communes ==
The district is further divided into nine communes:

- Ambatofinandrahana
- Ambatomifanongoa
- Ambondromisotra
- Amborompotsy
- Fenoarivo
- Itremo
- Mandrosonoro
- Mangataboahangy
- Soavina

== Geography ==
This district is situated on the Route nationale 35 from Morondava to Ivato.

== Nature ==
The protected area of the Massif d'Itremo.

== Geology ==
The only quartzite and marble quarries of Madagascar are found within 40 km from Ambatofinandrahana and there are found 7 qualities: green, pink, brown, cream, blue pastel, white and black.
