= Mahabo =

- commune urbaine
- Location in Madagascar
- Coordinates: 20°23′S 44°40′E

Area morondava-autrement.com
  - Total: 12,916 km^{2} (4,987 sq mi)
- Elevation: 123 m (404 ft)

Population (2018)
  - Total: 35,532
- Time zone: UTC3 (EAT)

Mahabo is a city (commune urbaine) in the Menabe Region, Western Madagascar.

It has a population of 35,532 as of 2018.

== Geography ==
Mahabo is located on Route nationale 35, between Morondava and Ivato.

== Rivers ==
The Morondava River.
