= Rakoto Joseph Nirina Lamboarivel =

Malagasy politician

Rakoto Joseph Nirina Lamboarivel is a Malagasy politician. A member of the National Assembly of Madagascar, he was elected as a member of the Tiako I Madagasikara party in the 2007 Malagasy parliamentary elections; he represents the constituency of Ambatofinandrahana.
