= Ambatofinandrahana =

Place in Madagascar

- Location in Madagascar
- Coordinates: 20°33′0″S 46°48′0″E
- Country: Madagascar
- District: Ambatofinandrahana District
- Region: Amoron'i Mania

Population (2018 census)
  - Total: 37,409
- Postal code: 304
- Climate: Cwb

Ambatofinandrahana is a municipality in Ambatofinandrahana District in central Madagascar.

It is a part of Amoron'i Mania region. The population was 37,409 at the 2018 census.

== Geography ==
This town lies at the Route nationale 35 from Morondava to Ivato at 67 km from Ivato.

== Nature ==
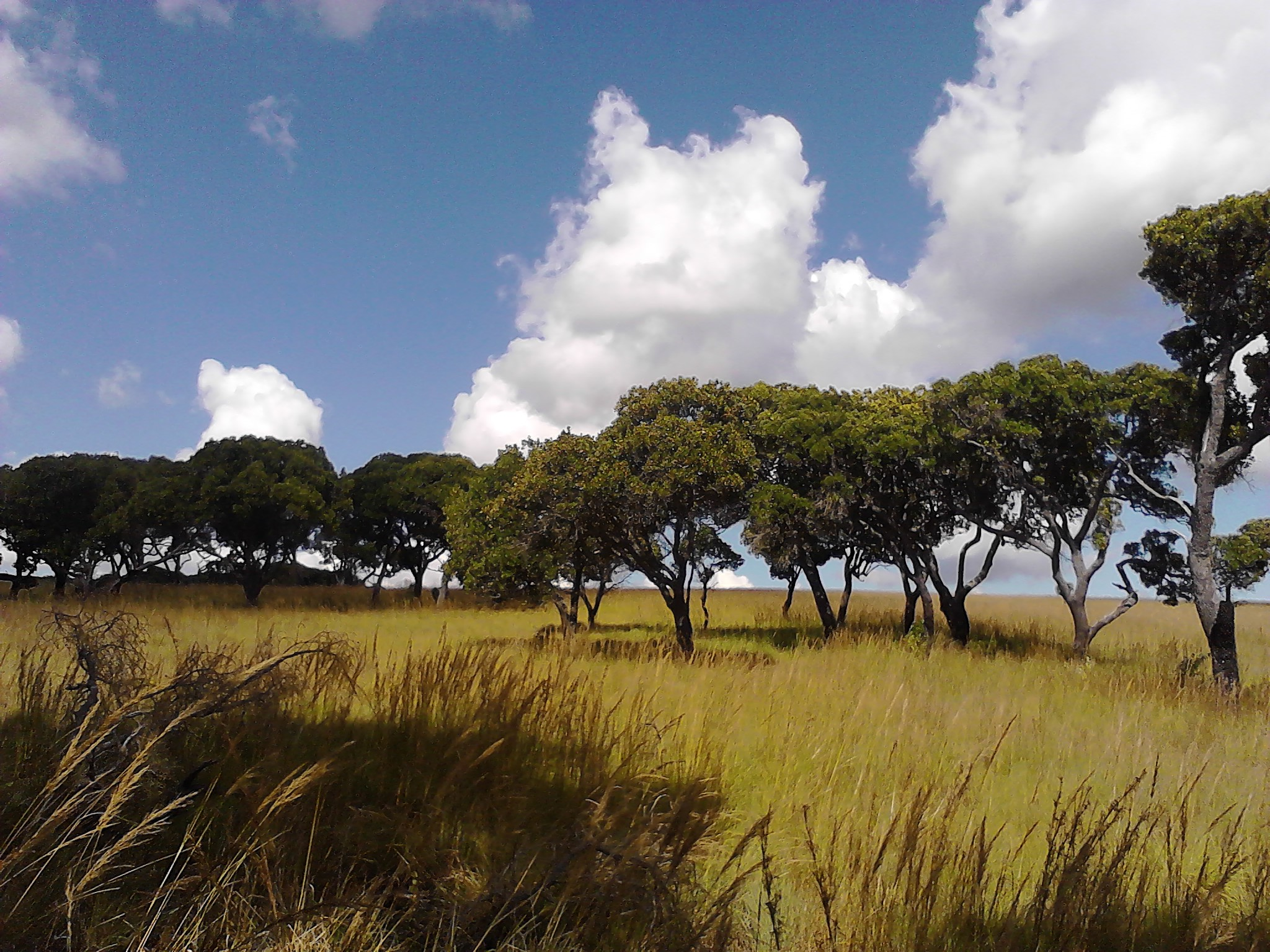
Tapia forest in the Itremo Massif

The protected area of the Massif d'Itremo.

The Tapia forest of Ambatofinandrahana supplies the town with fruits, champignons and wild silk.

== Geology ==
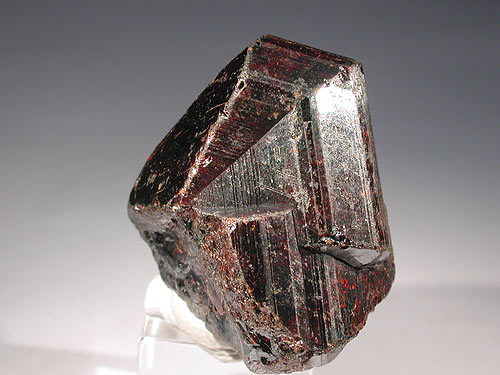
Rutile from Ambatofinandrahana

The only quartzite and marble quarries of Madagascar are found within 40km from this town and there are found 7 qualities: green, pink, brown, cream, blue pastel, white and black.
