= Ambia =

Ambia may refer to:

== Places and jurisdictions in Africa ==
- Ambia (Mauretania), an ancient former bishopric and present Latin Catholic titular see
- Ambia, Ihosy, Madagascar, a town
- Ambia, Mahabo, Madagascar, a town

== Places and jurisdictions elsewhere ==
- Ambia, Indiana, US, a town
- Ambia, Texas, US, an unincorporated community
- Ambía River, a tributary of the Arnoia River in Spain
- Ambia (Anosy), a river in Madagascar

== Other ==
- Ambia (moth), a genus of moths
