= Ankilizato, Mahabo =

Ankilizato
- Location in Madagascar
- Coordinates: 20°24′S 45°3′E
- Country: Madagascar
- Region: Menabe
- District: Mahabo
- Elevation: 174 m (571 ft)

Population (2001)
  - Total: 23,000
- Time zone: UTC3 (EAT)

Ankilizato is a town and commune (Malagasy: kaominina) in Madagascar. It belongs to the district of Mahabo, which is a part of Menabe Region.

The population of the commune was estimated to be approximately 23,000 in 2001 commune census.

== Geography ==
This town lies at the Route nationale 35 from Morondava to Ivato. It is located at the Sakamaly river, not far from its mouth into the Morondava River. In this municipality is also located the Dabara dam.

== Education ==
Primary and junior level secondary education are available in town. The majority 60% of the population of the commune are farmers, while an additional 40% receives their livelihood from raising livestock. The most important crop is rice, while other important products are maize and cassava.

One of the first communal land administration office in the region was set up by IFAD and the Ministry of Agriculture in October 2006. Ankilizato is among the 24 communes participating to the integrated area based development project AD2M
