= MOQ =

MOQ, Moq, Moq., moq, or MoQ may refer to:

- Pirsig's metaphysics of quality (MOQ) – a theory of reality
- Alfred Moquin-Tandon – a botanist whose author abbreviation is Moq.
- Morondava Airport – a Madagascan airport with the IATA code MOQ
- Mor language (Papuan) – a human language with the language code moq
- Moquegua Region – a region in Peru with ISO 3166 code PE-MOQ
- Minimum order quantity
- Media over QUIC, a media transport protocol designed to operate over QUIC
