= Fenoarivo, Ambatofinandrahana =

Fenoarivo
- Location in Madagascar
- Coordinates: 20°52′S 46°53′E
- Country: Madagascar
- Region: Amoron'i Mania
- District: Ambatofinandrahana
- Elevation: 1,371 m (4,498 ft)

Population (2001)
  - Total: 16,000
- Time zone: UTC3 (EAT)

Fenoarivo is a town and commune in Madagascar. It belongs to the district of Ambatofinandrahana, which is a part of Amoron'i Mania Region. The population of the commune was estimated to be approximately 16,000 in 2001 commune census.

Primary and junior level secondary education are available in town. The majority 50% of the population of the commune are farmers, while an additional 45% receives their livelihood from raising livestock. The most important crop is rice, while other important products are peanuts, beans, maize and cassava. Services provide employment for 5% of the population.
