= Befasy =

- Location in Madagascar
- Coordinates: 20°34′S 44°22′E
- Country: Madagascar
- Region: Menabe
- District: Morondava
- Elevation: 54 m (177 ft)

Population (2001)
  - Total: 15,000
- Time zone: UTC3 (EAT)

Befasy is a town and commune (Malagasy: kaominina) in Madagascar. It belongs to the district of Morondava, which is a part of Menabe Region. The population of the commune was estimated to be approximately 15,000 in 2001 commune census.

Primary and junior level secondary education are available in town. The majority 99% of the population of the commune are farmers. The most important crops are maize and lima beans, while other important agricultural products are peanuts and rice. Services provide employment for 1% of the population.
