= Befotaka, Mahabo =

Befotaka
- Location in Madagascar
- Coordinates: 20°50′S 45°40′E
- Country: Madagascar
- Region: Menabe
- District: Mahabo
- Elevation: 306 m (1,004 ft)

Population (2001)
  - Total: 9,000
- Time zone: UTC3 (EAT)

Befotaka is a town and commune (Malagasy: kaominina) in Madagascar. It belongs to the district of Mahabo, which is a part of Menabe Region. The population of the commune was estimated to be approximately 9,000 in 2001 commune census.

Only primary schooling is available. The majority 89.5% of the population of the commune are farmers, while an additional 10% receives their livelihood from raising livestock. The most important crop is rice, while other important products are cassava and sweet potatoes. Services provide employment for 0.5% of the population.
