= Amborompotsy =

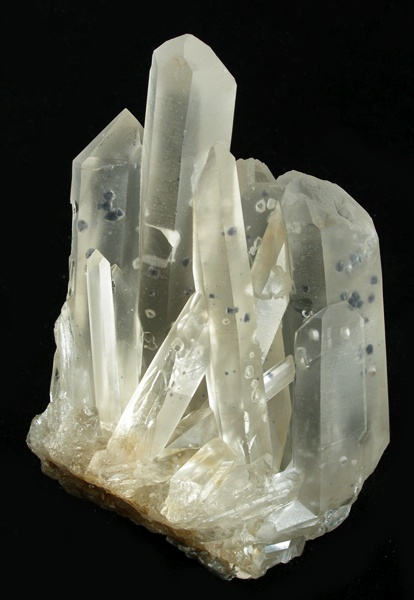
- Quartz-Fluorite from Amborompotsy

- Location in Madagascar
- Coordinates: 20°36′S 46°15′E
- Country: Madagascar
- Region: Amoron'i Mania
- District: Ambatofinandrahana
- Elevation: 1,080 m (3,540 ft)

Population (2001)
  - Total: 10,000
- Time zone: UTC3 (EAT)
- Climate: Cwa

Amborompotsy is a rural municipality in Madagascar. It belongs to the district of Ambatofinandrahana, which is a part of Amoron'i Mania Region. The population of the commune was estimated to be approximately 10,000 in 2001 commune census.

Primary and junior level secondary education are available in town. It is also a site of industrial-scale mining. The majority 60% of the population of the commune are farmers, while an additional 35% receives their livelihood from raising livestock. The most important crops are rice and beans, while other important agricultural products are maize and cassava. Services provide employment for 5% of the population.
