= Tsimazava =

- Location in Madagascar
- Coordinates: 20°41′S 45°42′E
- Country: Madagascar
- Region: Menabe
- District: Mahabo
- Elevation: 238 m (781 ft)

Population (2001)
  - Total: 3,000
- Time zone: UTC3 (EAT)

Tsimazava is a town and commune (Malagasy: kaominina) in Madagascar. It belongs to the district of Mahabo, which is a part of Menabe Region. The population of the commune was estimated to be approximately 3,000 in 2001 commune census.

Only primary schooling is available. The majority 90% of the population of the commune are farmers, while an additional 10% receives their livelihood from raising livestock. The most important crop is rice, while other important products are bananas, sugarcane and cassava.
