= Beronono, Mahabo =

Beronono
- Location in Madagascar
- Coordinates: 20°54′S 45°3′E
- Country: Madagascar
- Region: Menabe
- District: Mahabo
- Elevation: 310 m (1,020 ft)

Population (2001)
  - Total: 5,000
- Time zone: UTC3 (EAT)
- Postal code: 615

Beronono is a rural municipality in Madagascar. It belongs to the district of Mahabo, which is a part of Menabe Region. The population of the commune was estimated to be approximately 5,000 in 2001 commune census.

Beronono & the Mangoky River

Only primary schooling is available. The majority 89.5% of the population of the commune are farmers, while an additional 10% receives their livelihood from raising livestock. The most important crop is rice, while other important products are bananas, sugarcane and cassava. Services provide employment for 0.5% of the population.
