= Betania, Madagascar =

Coastal village in Madagascar

Betania (Morondava)
- Village
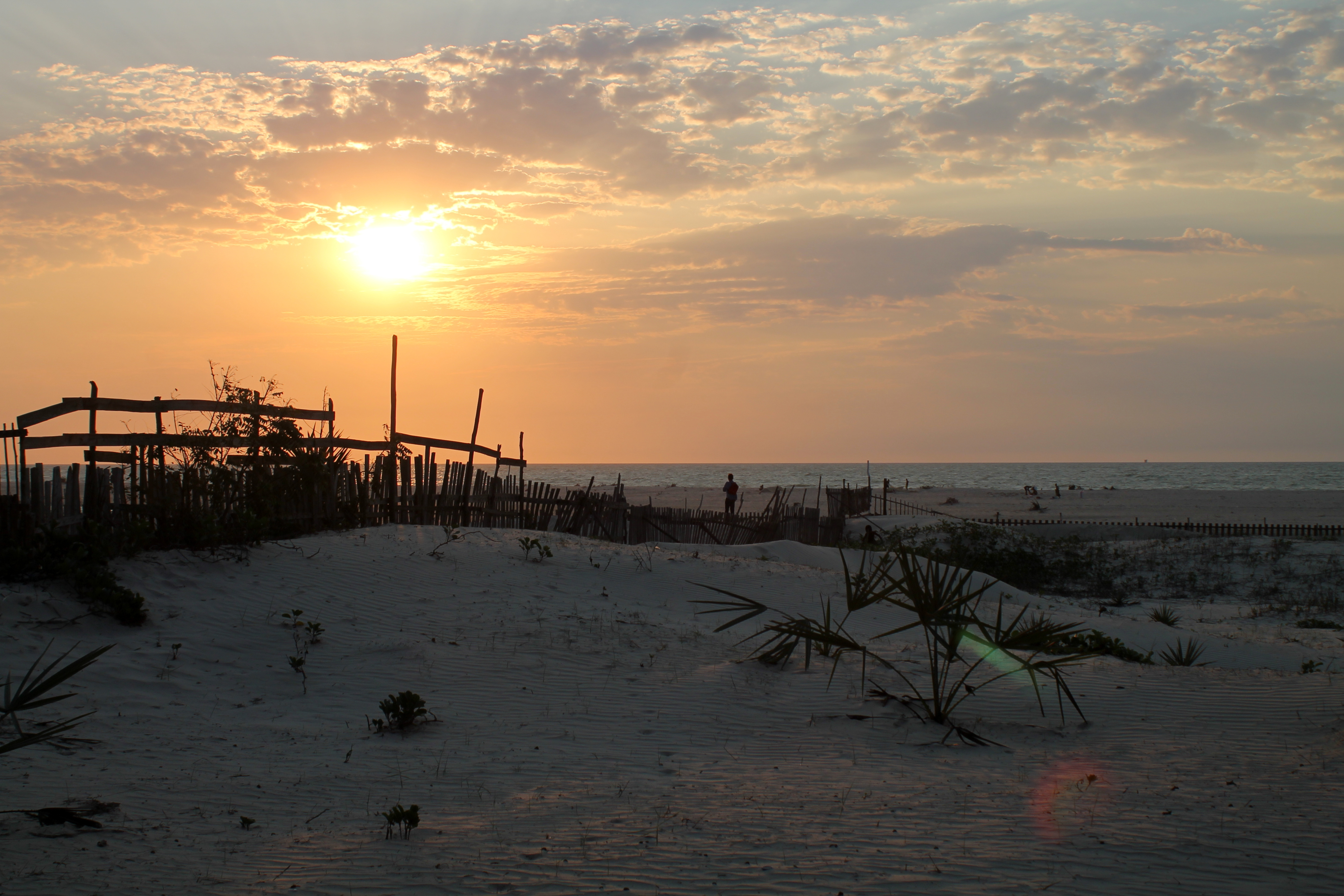
- Betania

- Location within Madagascar
- Coordinates: 20°19′13″S 44°16′3″E
- Country: Madagascar
- Region: Menabe
- Municipality: Morondava
- Elevation coastal: 8 m (26 ft)

Population (2)
  - Total: 2,400
- postal code: 619
- Area code: 95

Betania is a coastal village in western Madagascar south of Morondava with a population of around 2,400 Vezo fishermen. This village belongs to the municipality of Morondava and is situated on the southern side of the mouth of the Morondava River.

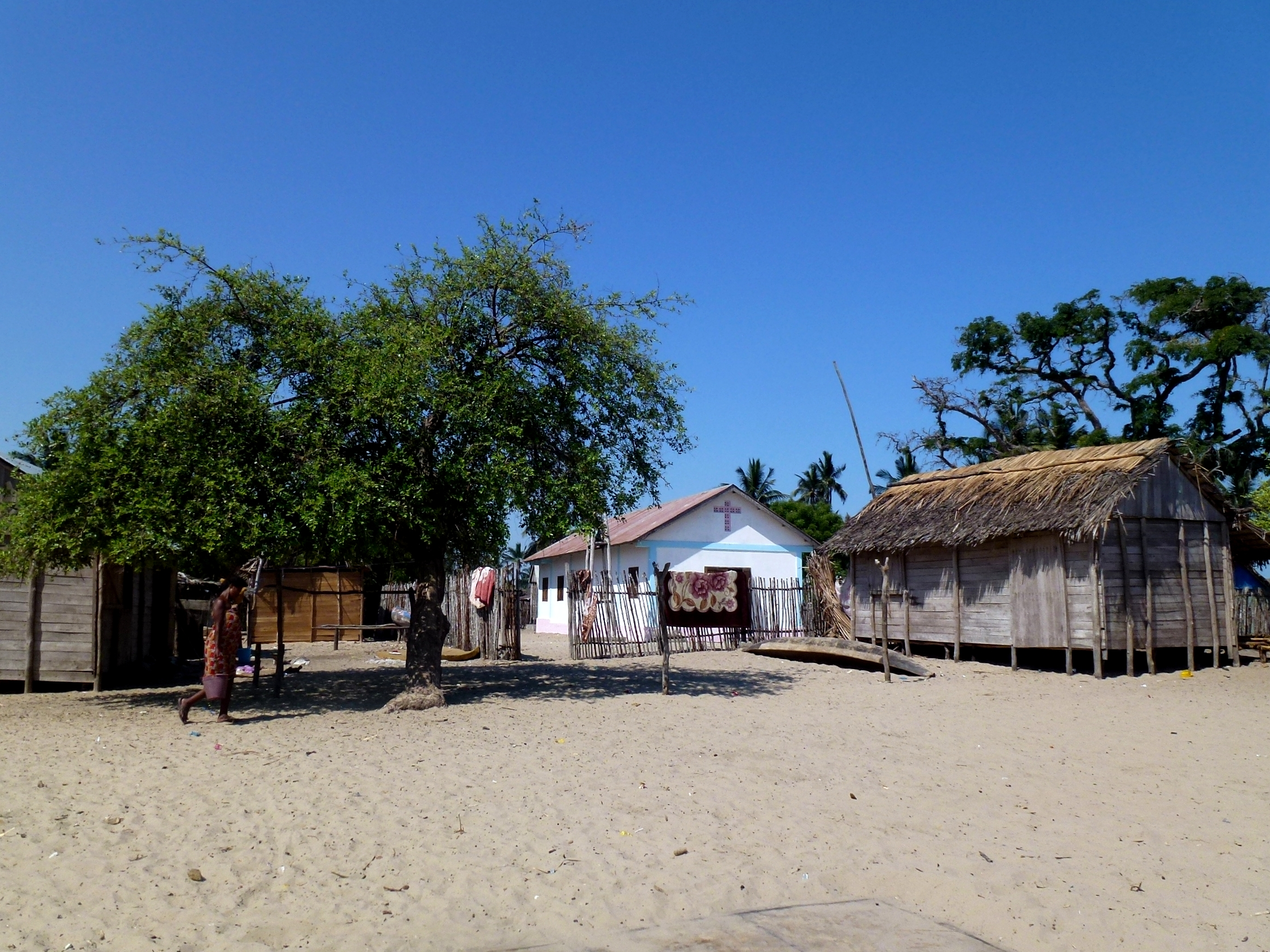
Betania
