= Soavina, Ambatofinandrahana =

Soavina
- Location in Madagascar
- Coordinates: 20°23′S 46°55′E
- Country: Madagascar
- Region: Amoron'i Mania
- District: Ambatofinandrahana
- Elevation: 1,098 m (3,602 ft)

Population (2018)
  - Total: 4,871
- Time zone: UTC3 (EAT)

Soavina is a town and commune in Madagascar. It belongs to the district of Ambatofinandrahana, which is a part of Amoron'i Mania Region. The population of the commune was 4,871 in 2018.

Primary and junior level secondary education are available in town. 98% of the communes population are farmers. The most important crop is rice, while beans, maize and cassava are also significant crops. Services provide employment for 2% of the population.
