= Ampanihy, Mahabo =

Ampanihy
- Location in Madagascar
- Coordinates: 20°35′S 44°44′E
- Country: Madagascar
- Region: Menabe
- District: Mahabo
- Elevation: 135 m (443 ft)

Population (2001)
  - Total: 7,000
- Time zone: UTC3 (EAT)

Ampanihy is a town and commune (Malagasy: kaominina) in Madagascar. It belongs to the district of Mahabo, which is a part of Menabe Region. The population of the commune was estimated to be approximately 7,000 in 2001 commune census.

Only primary schooling is available. It is also a site of industrial-scale mining. The majority 89% of the population of the commune are farmers, while an additional 10% receives their livelihood from raising livestock. The most important crop is rice, while other important products are cassava and sweet potatoes. Industry and services provide both employment for 0.5% of the population.
