= Ankilivalo =

- Location in Madagascar
- Coordinates: 20°17′S 44°38′E
- Country: Madagascar
- Region: Menabe
- District: Mahabo
- Elevation: 58 m (190 ft)

Population (2001)
  - Total: 13,000
- Time zone: UTC3 (EAT)

Ankilivalo is a town and commune (Malagasy: kaominina) in Madagascar. It belongs to the district of Mahabo, which is a part of Menabe Region. The population of the commune was estimated to be approximately 13,000 in 2001 commune census.

Primary and junior level secondary education are available in town. The majority 90% of the population of the commune are farmers, while an additional 8% receives their livelihood from raising livestock. The most important crops are rice and other peas, while other important agricultural products are cassava and pea of the course. Services provide employment for 2% of the population.
