= Andranomena Special Reserve =

Nature reserve in Madagascar

- IUCN category IV (habitat/species management area)
- Location within Madagascar
- Location: Menabe Region, Madagascar
- Nearest city: Morondava
- Coordinates: 20°10′22″S 44°31′4″E
- Area: 64.2 km^{2} (24.8 sq mi)
- Established: 28 October 1958
- Governing body: Madagascar National Parks (PNM-ANGAP)

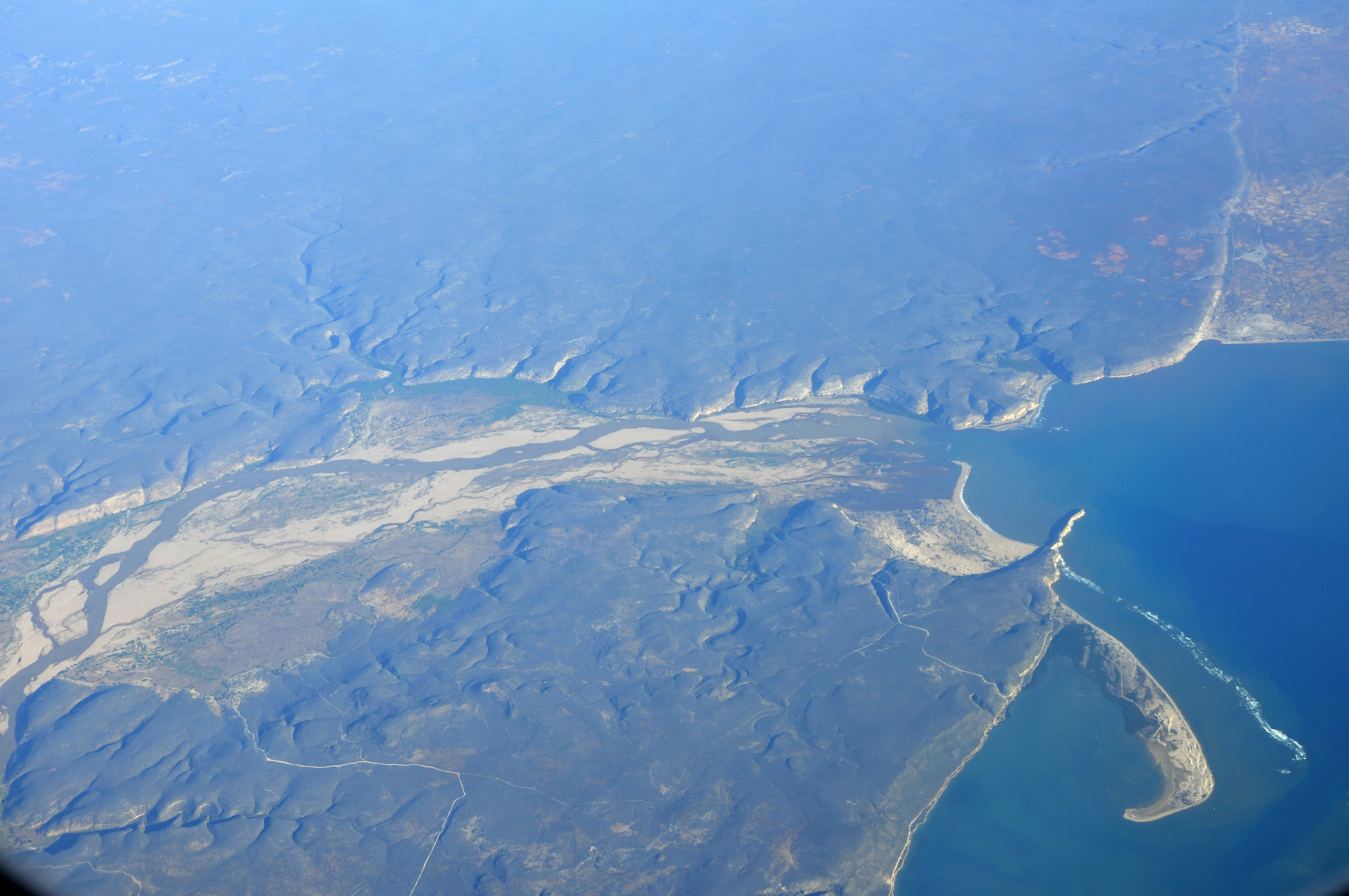
Aerial View of Andranomena

Andranomena Special Reserve is a wildlife reserve in Menabe Region, western Madagascar, near the city of Morondava and the rural commune of Bemanonga.

== Geography ==
This 6,400 hectares (16,000 acres) reserve is 30 kilometres (19 mi) north-east of the city of Morondava and 10 kilometres (6.2 mi) from Baoababs' Alley in western Madagascar. Altitude ranges from sea level to 100 metres (330 ft). The annual rainfall is 900 millimetres (35 in) and can be visited throughout the year, including the wet season (December to March). There is no overnight accommodation within the park.

== Flora and fauna ==
Habitats on the reserve consist mainly of dry scrubland, deciduous dry forest with the vegetation dominated by the plant families, Bombacaceae, Burseraceae and Euphorbiaceae. Some of the species include Adansonia rubrostipa, commonly known as fony baobab, the ebony tree (Diospyros platycalyx), Euphorbia antso and Hazomalania voyronii which has timber that contains camphor an insect repellent. There are also small seasonal lakes with locally endemic aquatic plants.

Ten species of mammal have been recorded on the reserve including eight species of lemur, 48 bird species, eleven species of reptile and one amphibian. Coquerel's sifaka (Propithecus coquereli) was previously found at this site but has since been extirpated. Mammals found on the reserve include Madame Berthe's mouse lemur (Microcebus berthae), which is evaluated as an endangered species by the International Union for Conservation of Nature (IUCN) and is the smallest species of mouse lemur; an endangered species, Pale fork-marked lemur (Phaner pallescens); red-tailed sportive lemur (Lepilemur ruficaudatus) also vulnerable; and the Fossa (Cryptoprocta ferox), a cat-like, carnivore and also a vulnerable species.

== Threats ==
The reserve is threatened by poaching, illegal felling of trees and slash-and-burn agriculture.

== See also ==
- List of national parks of Madagascar
