= Ambondromisotra =

- Location in Madagascar
- Coordinates: 20°20′S 46°55′E
- Country: Madagascar
- Region: Amoron'i Mania
- District: Ambatofinandrahana
- Elevation: 1,069 m (3,507 ft)

Population (2001)
  - Total: 17,000
- Time zone: UTC3 (EAT)

Ambondromisotra is a town and commune in Madagascar. It belongs to the district of Ambatofinandrahana, which is a part of Amoron'i Mania Region. The population of the commune was estimated to be approximately 17,000 in 2001 commune census.

Primary and junior level secondary education are available in town. The majority 99.5% of the population of the commune are farmers. The area surrounding Ambondromisotra is an important rice growing center—the town itself sits in the middle of a vast array of rice paddies. Other important agricultural products are beans, peanuts and cassava. Services provide employment for 0.5% of the population.

The town and surrounding villages have hosted U.S. Peace Corps volunteers over the years, working in the health and environment sectors.
