= Belo sur Mer =

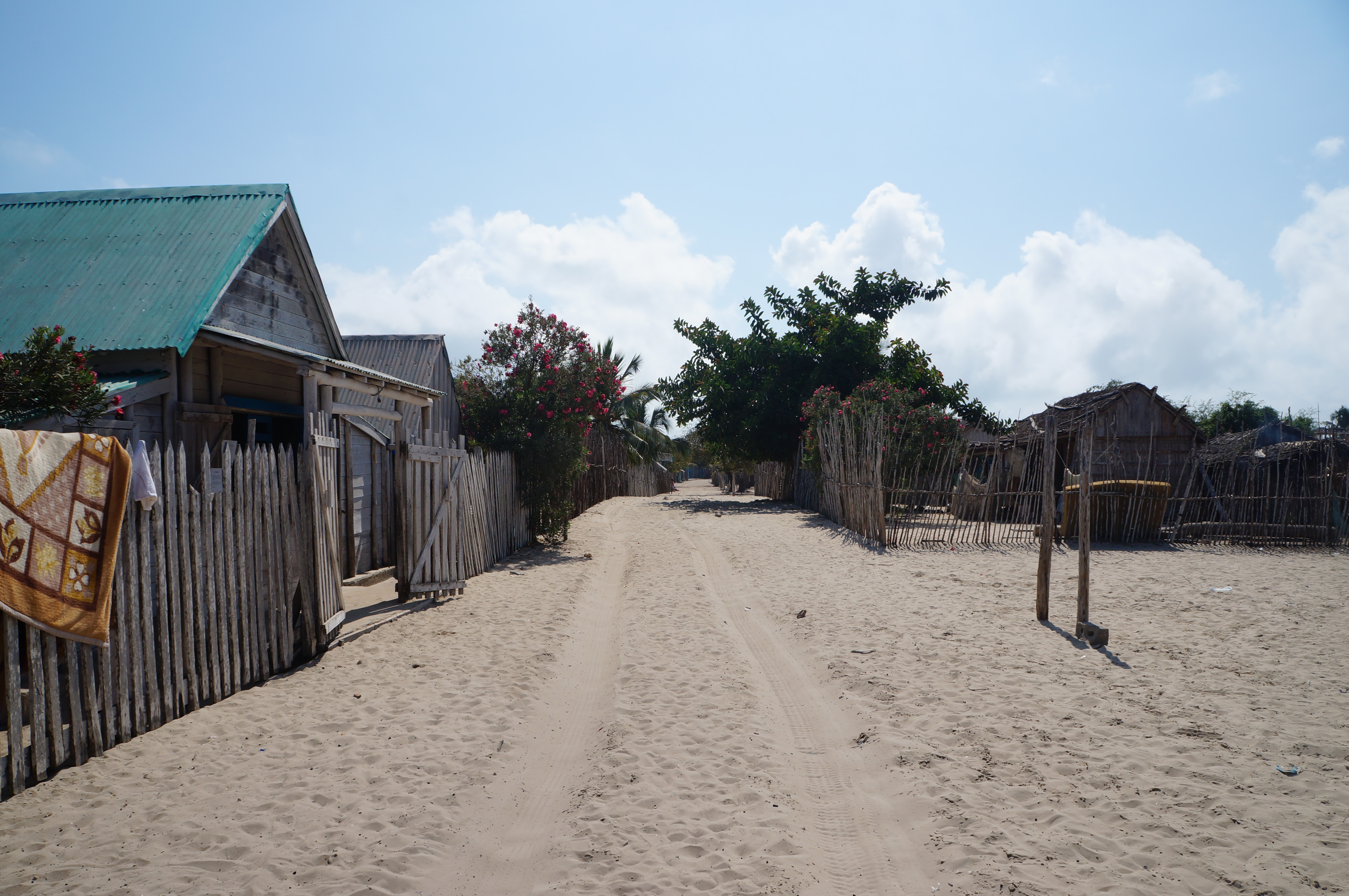
- main road of Belo sur Mer

- Location in Madagascar
- Coordinates: 20°44′S 44°0′E
- Country: Madagascar
- Region: Menabe
- District: Morondava
- Elevation: 5 m (16 ft)

Population (2001)
  - Total: 8,000
- Time zone: UTC3 (EAT)
- Postal code: 619

Belo sur Mer is a rural municipality in Madagascar. It belongs to the district of Morondava, which is a part of Menabe Region. The population of the commune was estimated to be approximately 8,000 in 2001 commune census.

Primary and junior level secondary education are available in town. It is also a site of industrial-scale mining. The majority 60% of the population of the commune are farmers. The most important crop is maize, while other important products are sweet potatoes and lima beans. Industry provides employment for 10% of the population. Additionally fishing employs 30% of the population.

== Economy ==
Belo sur mer is well known for its boatbuilders of traditional wooden dhows. There are also Salt evaporation ponds in the commune.

== National Parks ==
Belo sur Mer is the entry point to the Kirindy Mitea National Park.

== Gallery ==
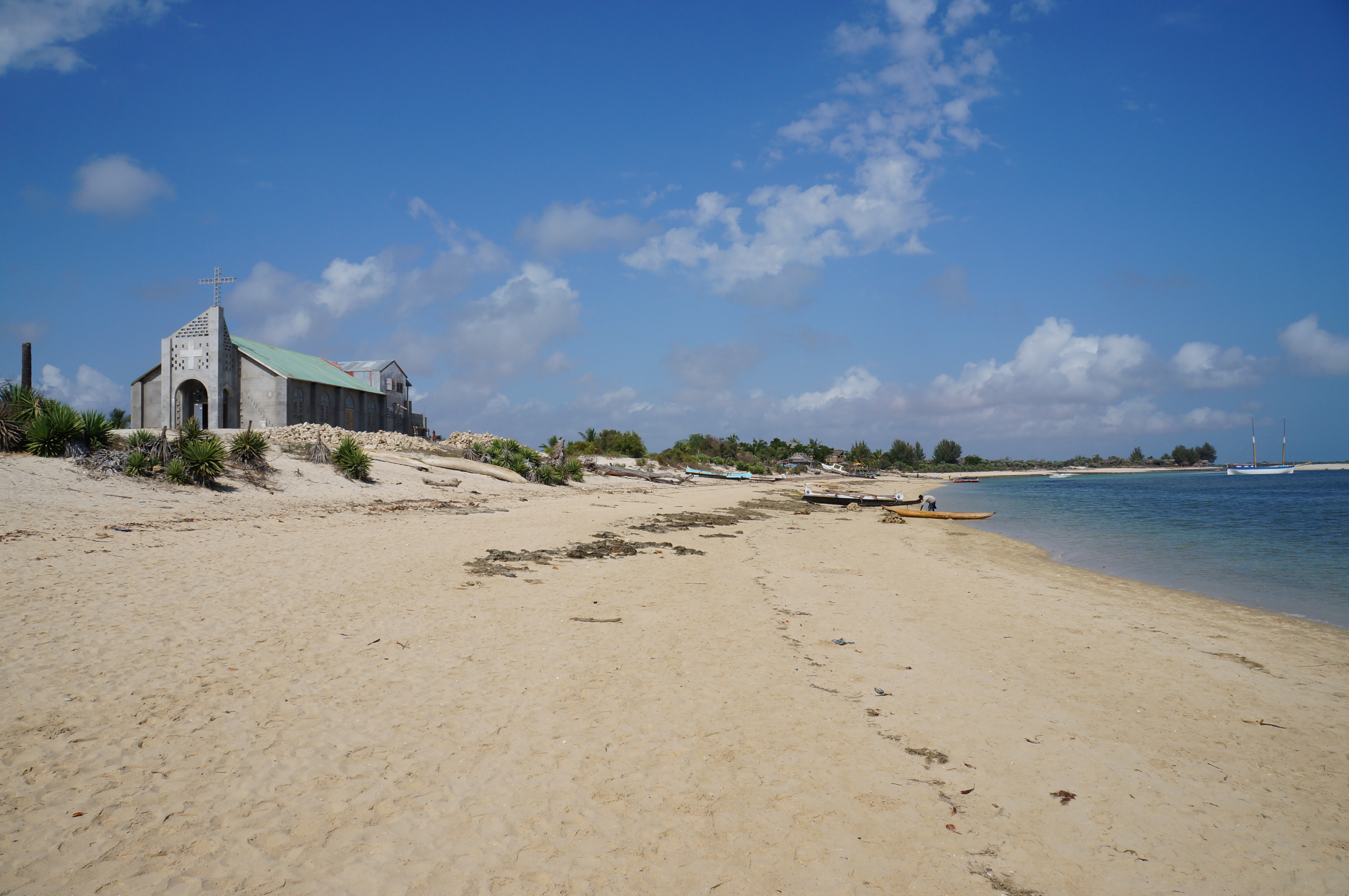
Beach & church

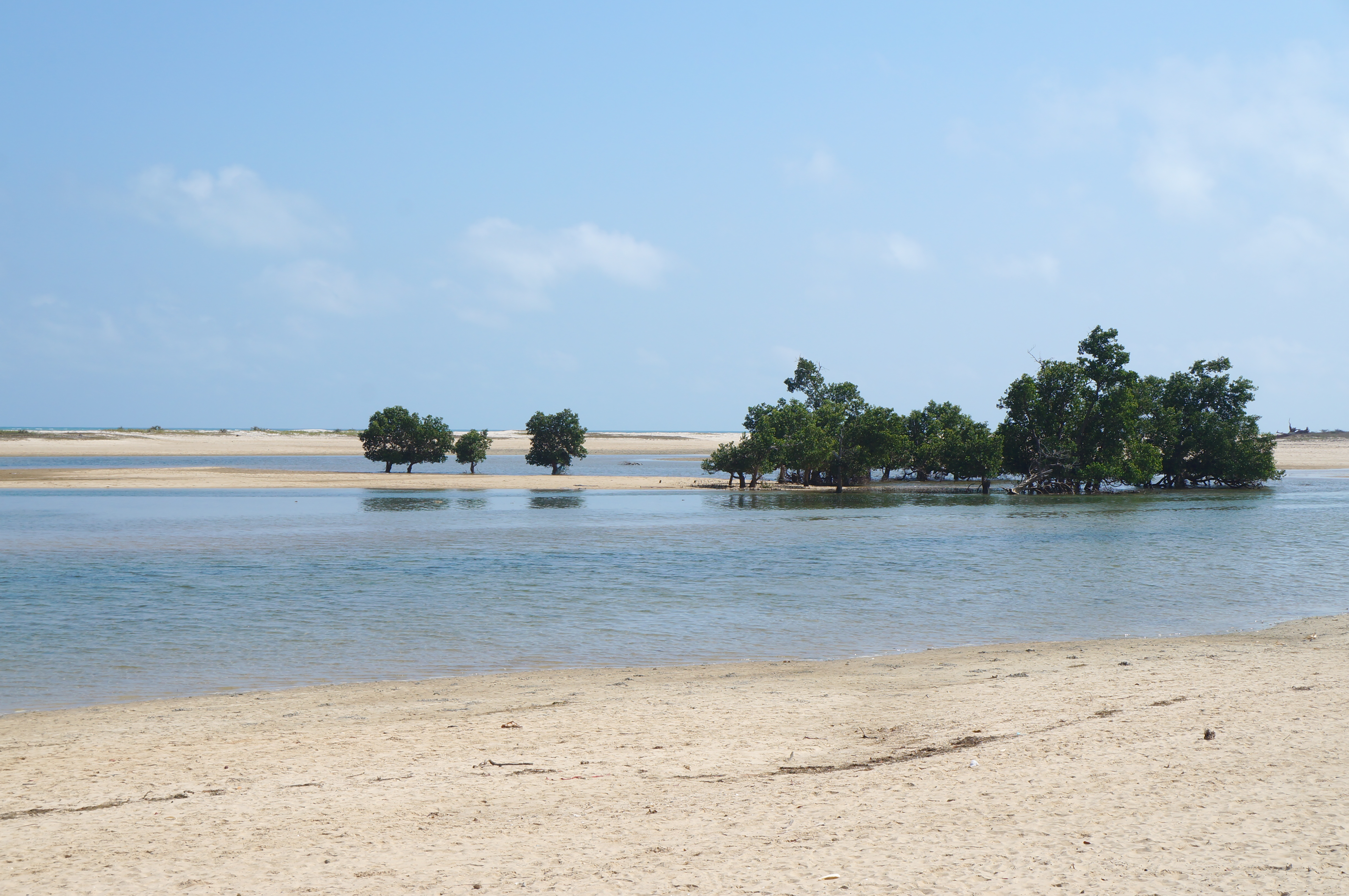
Mangroves

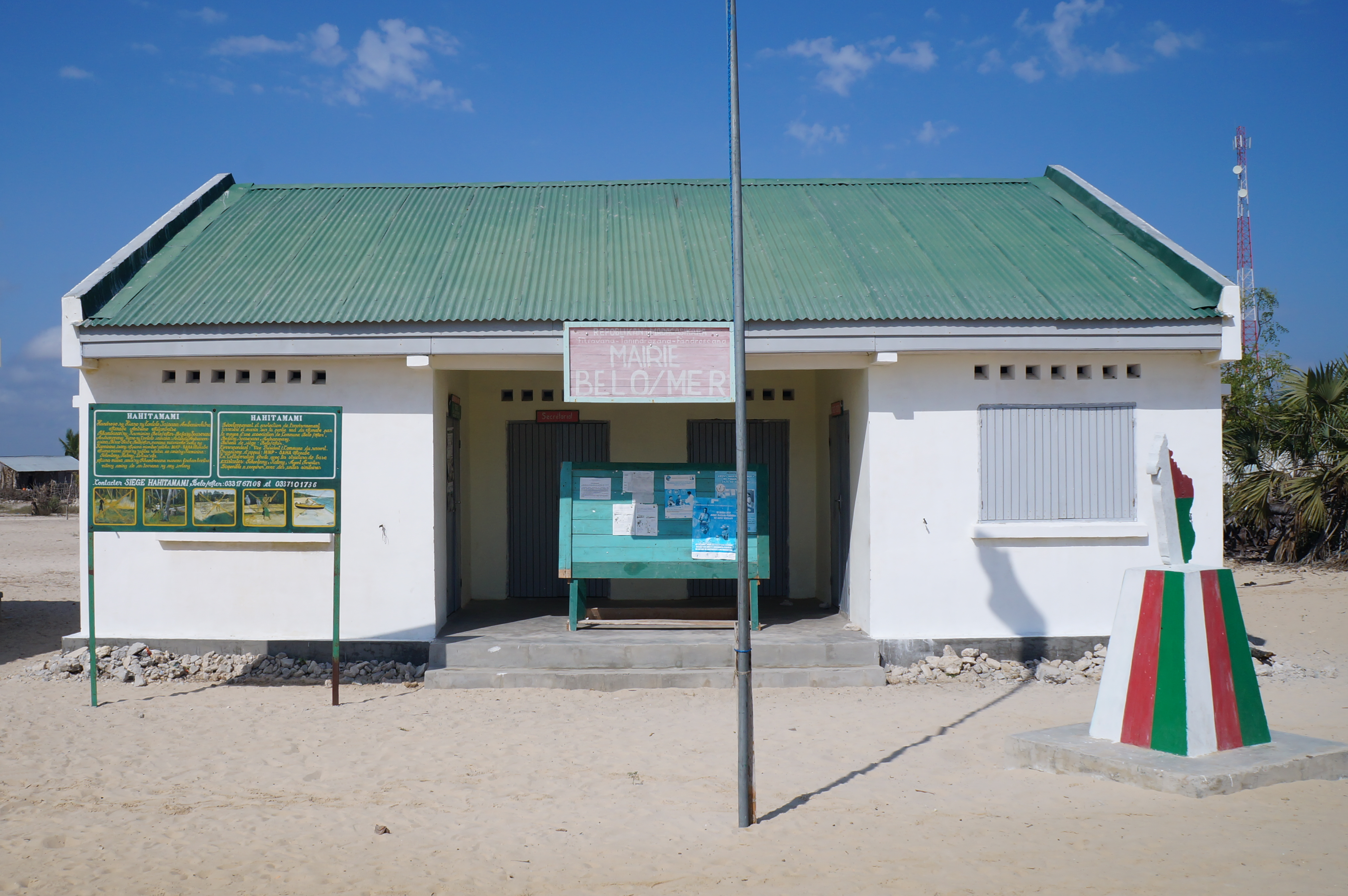
Town hall

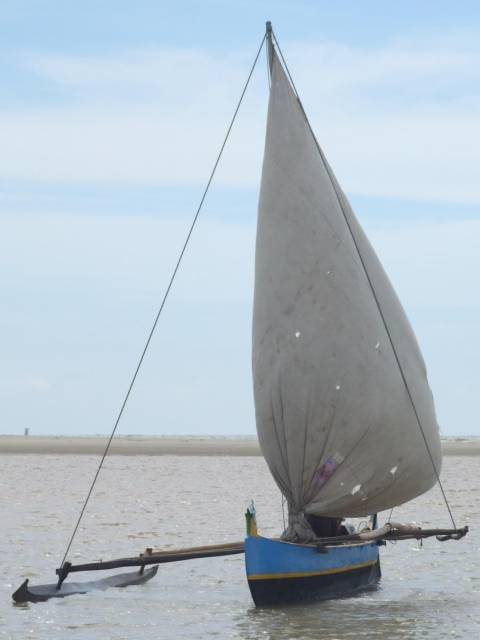
Outrigger boat
