= Ambatomifanongoa =

- Location in Madagascar
- Coordinates: 20°16′S 46°55′E
- Country: Madagascar
- Region: Amoron'i Mania
- District: Ambatofinandrahana
- Elevation: 1,155 m (3,789 ft)

Population (2001)
  - Total: 10,000
- Time zone: UTC3 (EAT)

Ambatomifanongoa is a town and commune in Madagascar. It belongs to the district of Ambatofinandrahana, which is a part of Amoron'i Mania region. The population of the commune was estimated to be approximately 10,000 in the 2001 commune census.

Only primary schooling is available. The majority 99% of the population of the commune are farmers. The most important crops are rice and beans; maize is also an important agricultural product. Services provide employment for 0.8% of the population. Additionally, fishing employs 0.2% of the population.
