= Mangataboahangy =

- Location in Madagascar
- Coordinates: 20°16′S 46°12′E
- Country: Madagascar
- Region: Amoron'i Mania
- District: Ambatofinandrahana
- Elevation: 1,092 m (3,583 ft)

Population (2001)
  - Total: 8,000
- Time zone: UTC3 (EAT)

Mangataboahangy is a town and commune in Madagascar. It belongs to the district of Ambatofinandrahana, which is a part of Amoron'i Mania Region. The population of the commune was estimated to be approximately 8,000 in 2001 commune census.

Only primary schooling is available. It is also a site of industrial-scale mining. The majority 95% of the population of the commune are farmers. The most important crop is rice, while other important products are peanuts, beans, maize and cassava. Services provide employment for 5% of the population.
