= Analamitsivala =

- Location in Madagascar
- Coordinates: 20°19′S 44°41′E
- Country: Madagascar
- Region: Menabe
- District: Mahabo
- Elevation: 65 m (213 ft)

Population (2001)
  - Total: 11,000
- Time zone: UTC3 (EAT)

Analamitsivala is a town and commune (Malagasy: kaominina) in Madagascar. It belongs to the district of Mahabo, which is a part of Menabe Region. The population of the commune was estimated to be approximately 11,000 in 2001 commune census.

Only primary schooling is available. The majority 96.5% of the population of the commune are farmers, while an additional 2% receives their livelihood from raising livestock. The most important crop is rice, while other important products are peanuts, maize and cassava. Services provide employment for 0.5% of the population. Additionally fishing employs 1% of the population.
