= Avenue of the Baobabs =

Protected area in Madagascar

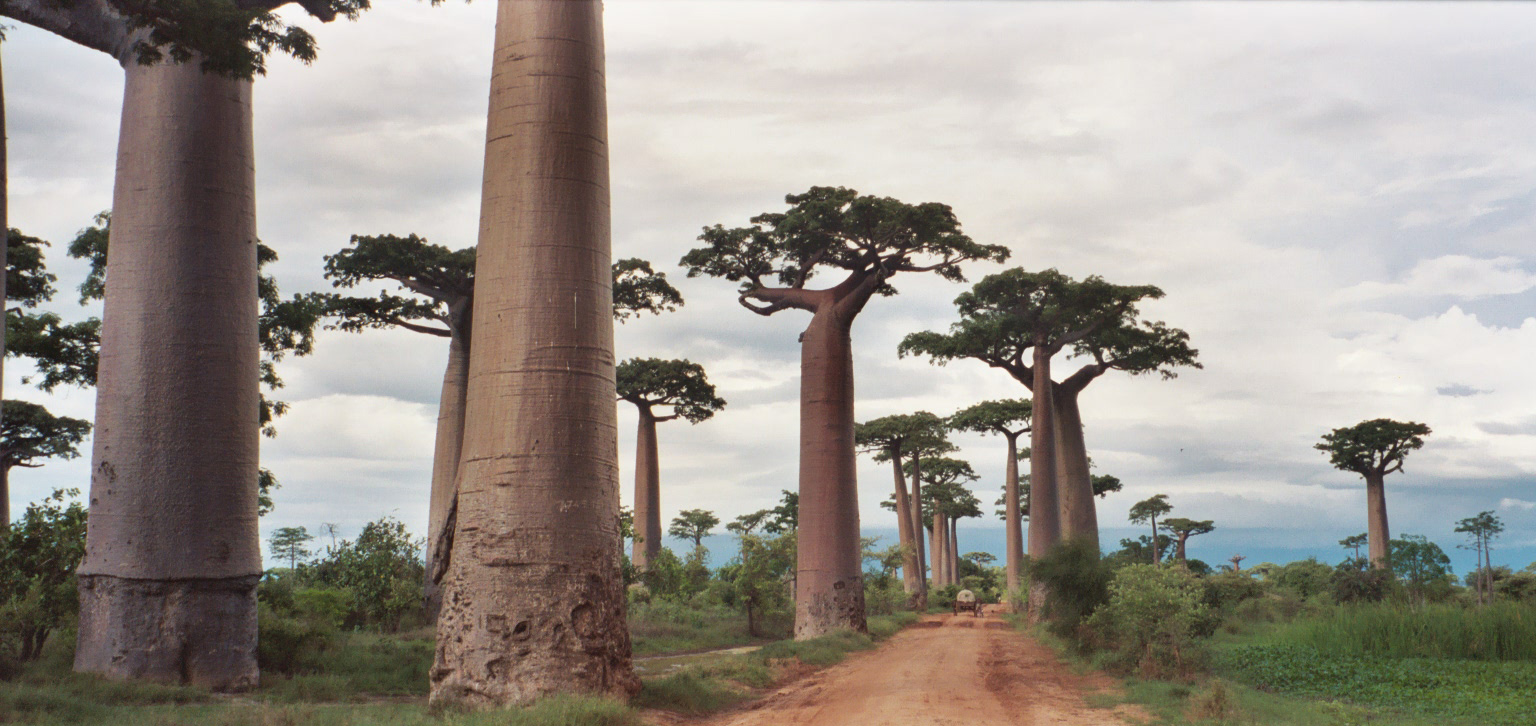
- View of the trees on the road
- Interactive map of Avenue of the Baobabs
- Location: Menabe, Madagascar
- Nearest city: Morondava
- Coordinates: 20°15′00″S 44°25′10″E

The Avenue of the Baobabs, or Alley of the Baobabs, is a prominent group of Grandidier's baobabs (Adansonia grandidieri) lining the unpaved Road No.8 between Morondava and Belon'i Tsiribihina in the Menabe region of western Madagascar. Its striking landscape draws travelers from around the world, making it one of the most visited locations in the region. It has been a center of local conservation efforts, and was granted temporary protected status in July 2007 by the Ministry of Environment, Water and Forestry – a step toward making it Madagascar's first natural monument.

== Description ==
Along a 260 m (850 ft) stretch of the road is a grove of 20–25 Adansonia grandidieri baobabs. An additional 25 or so trees of this species are found growing over nearby rice paddies and meadows within 9.9 acres (4 ha) of land. The trees, which are endemic to Madagascar, are about 30 m (98 ft) in height.

The baobab trees, known locally as renala or reniala (from Malagasy reny ala "mother of the forest") are a legacy of the dense tropical forests that once thrived on Madagascar. The trees did not originally tower in isolation over the sere landscape of scrub, but stood in dense forest. Over the years, as the country's population grew, the forests were cleared for agriculture, leaving only the baobab trees, which the locals preserved as much for their own sake as for their value as a food source and building material.

=== Baobab Amoureux ===
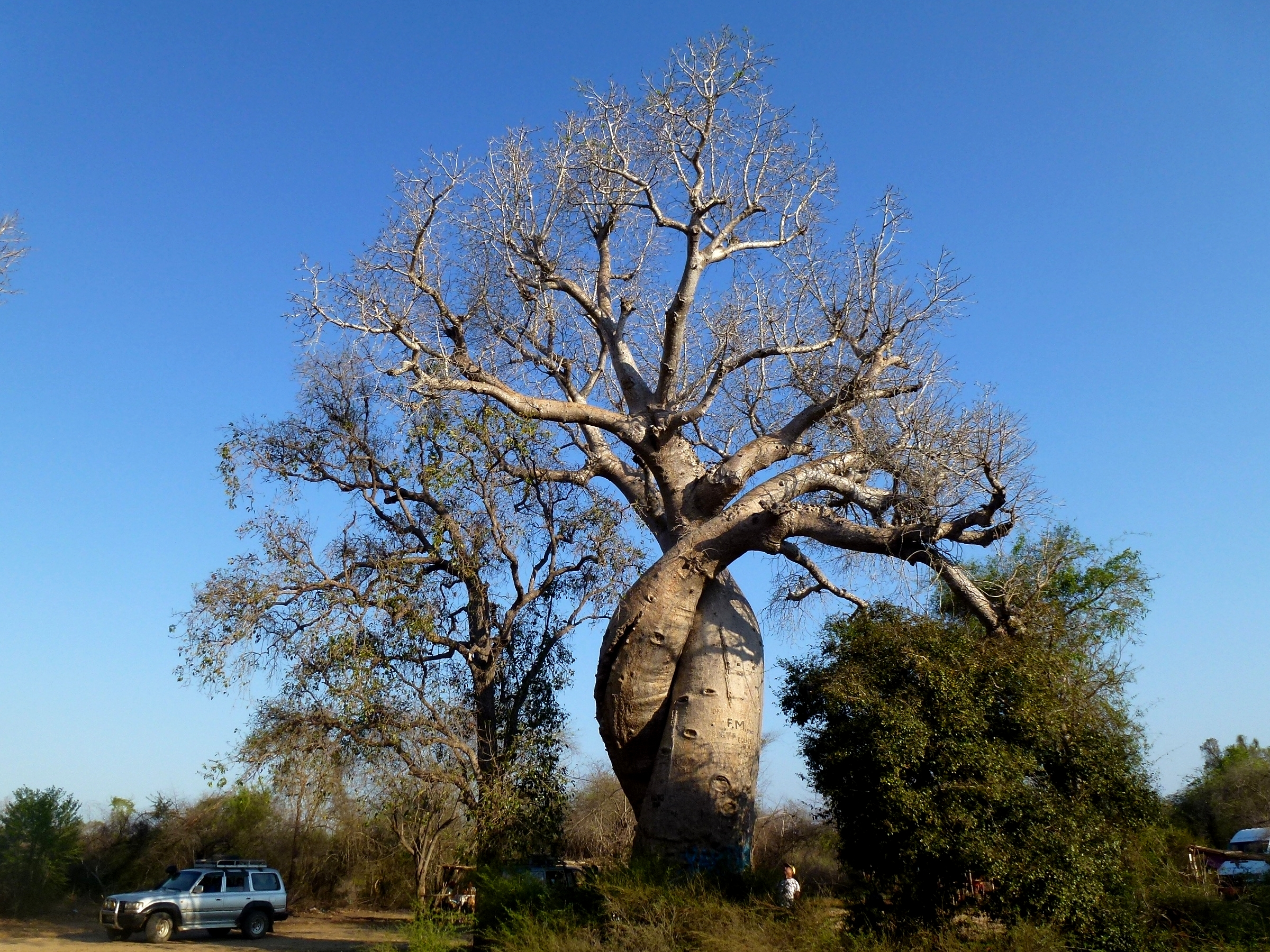
The Baobab Amoureux

Some 7 km (4.3 mi) to the northwest are the Baobab Amoureux, which are two notable Adansonia za trees—also an endemic baobab species—that have become twisted to each other as they grew. According to legend, these two baobabs came and grew together across the centuries. Baobabs found themselves after an impossible love between a young man and young woman of the nearby village. Both youths already had designated partners and had to marry separately in their respective villages. However, the impossible couple dreamed of a life and child together and asked the help of their god. Both baobabs were born and now live there for eternity as one as the couple always wished.

== Conservation status ==
The area is a natural monument under conservation since July 2015, but the trees are still threatened by further deforestation, effluents from encroaching paddy fields, bushfires, and forest fires. There are a few tourist shops nearby and there is a parking fee of 5000 (less than 2 USD) local currency as of 2026. Fanamby, a Malagasy non-governmental organization, has launched an ecotourism project aimed at conservation of the area and economic improvement for the local community since 2014 and has inaugurated infrastructures to help them promote the area in 2018.

== Gallery ==
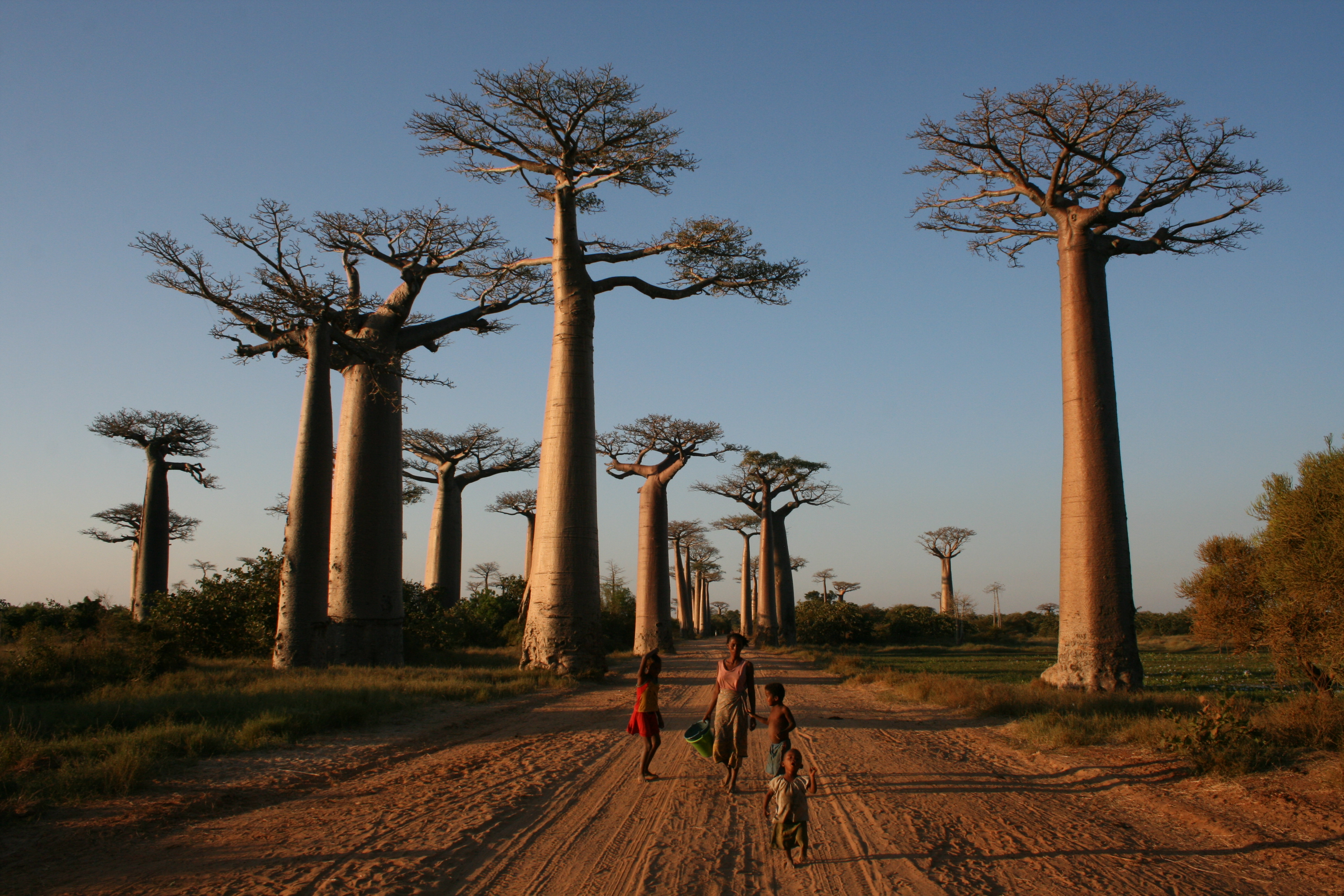
Local people on the Avenue

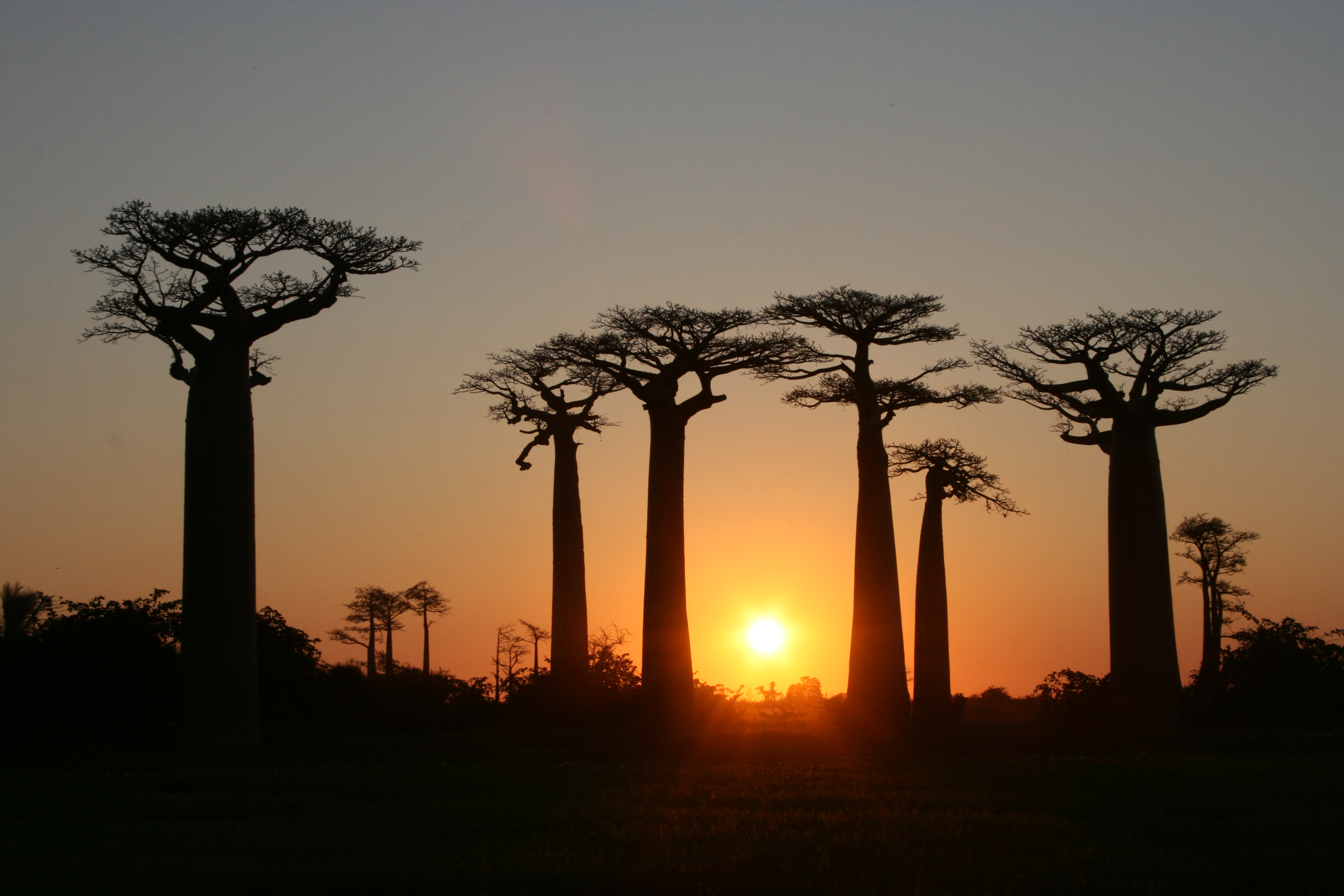
During sunset

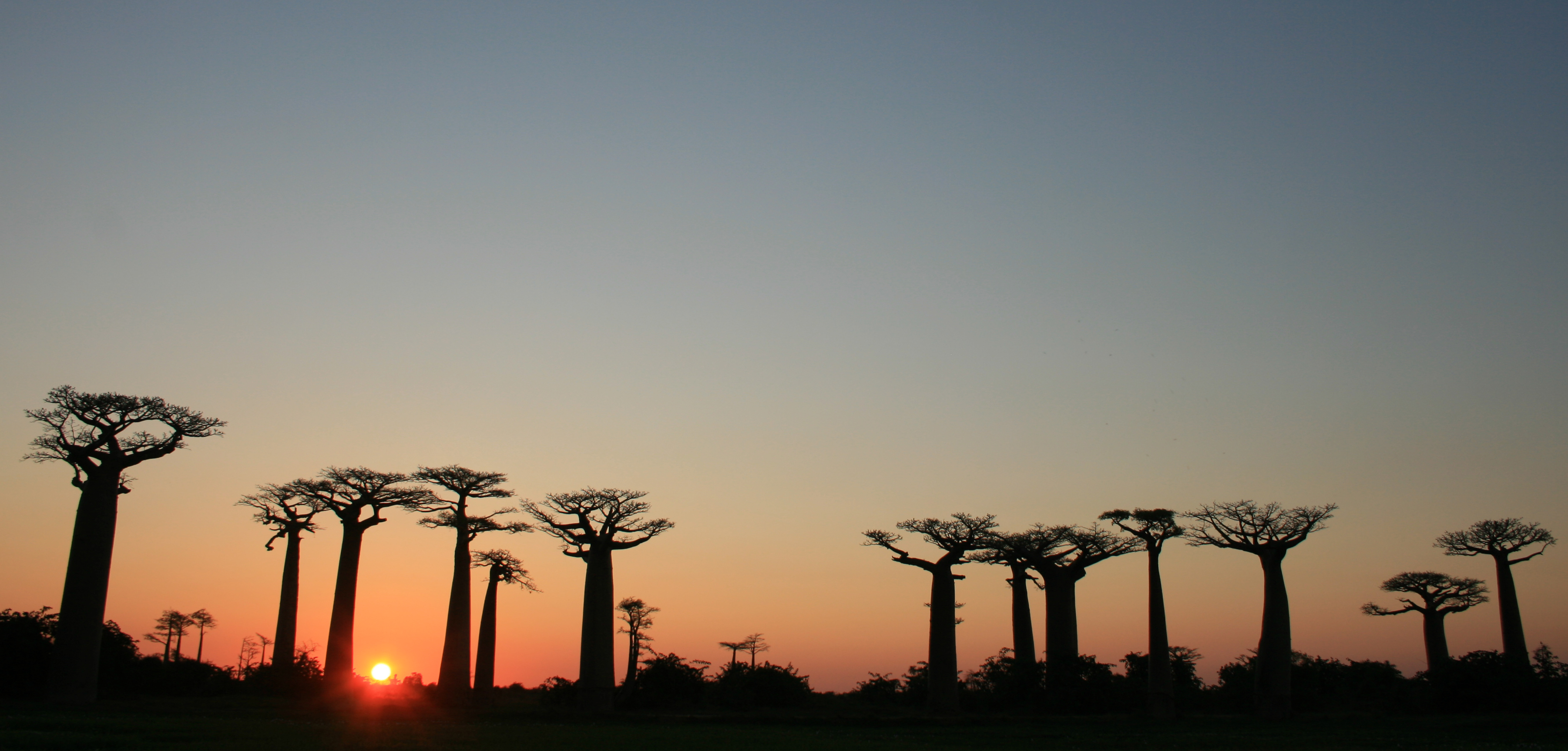
Panoramic view of the Avenue at sunset

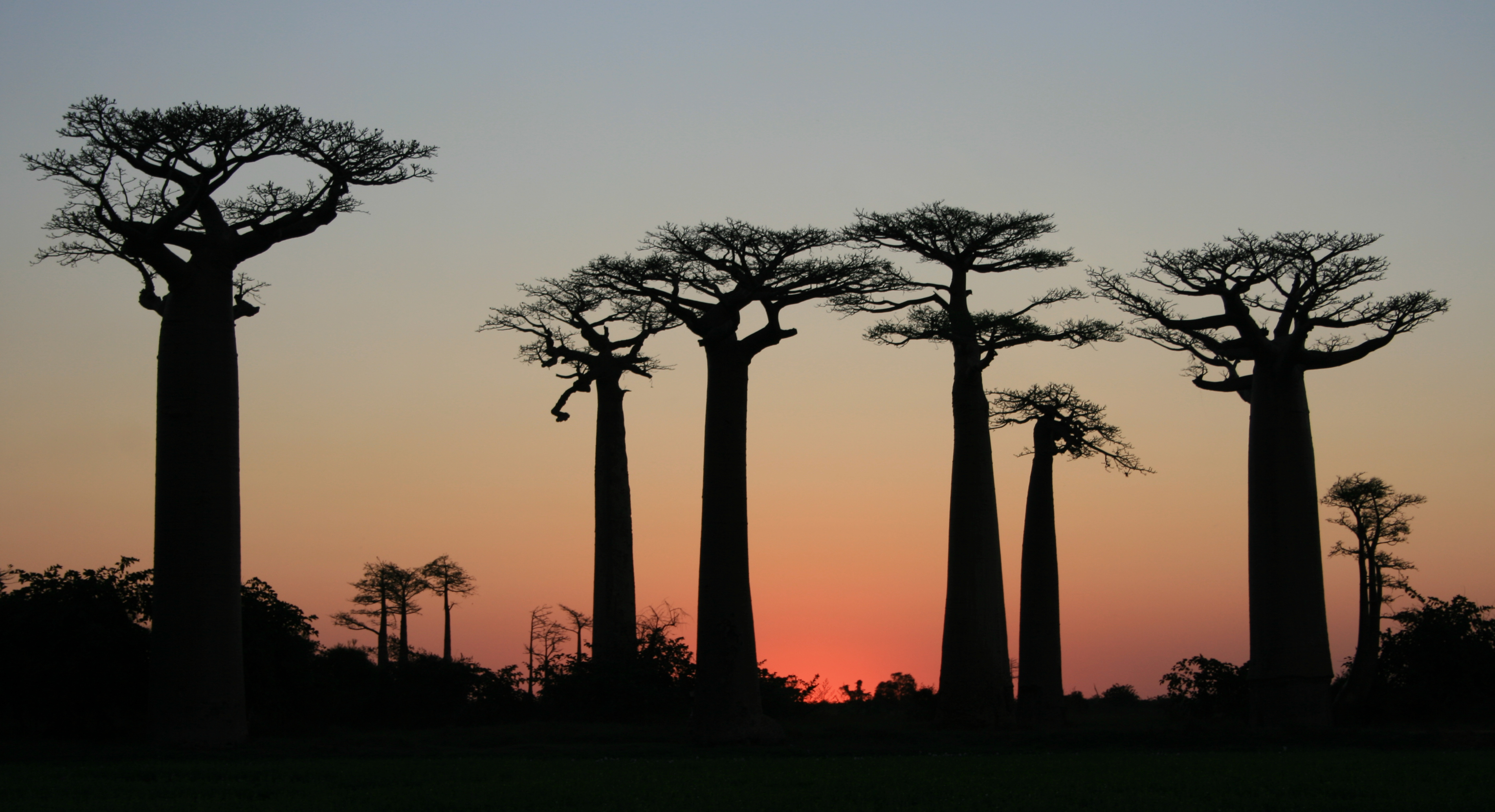
After sunset
