= Ambia, Mahabo =

Ambia
- Location in Madagascar
- Coordinates: 20°37′S 45°2′E
- Country: Madagascar
- Region: Menabe
- District: Mahabo
- Elevation: 199 m (653 ft)

Population (2001)
  - Total: 4,000
- Time zone: UTC3 (EAT)

Ambia is a town and commune (Malagasy: kaominina) in Madagascar. It belongs to the district of Mahabo, which is a part of Menabe Region. The population of the commune was estimated to be approximately 4,000 in 2001 commune census.

Only primary schooling is available. The majority 89.5% of the population of the commune are farmers, while an additional 10% receives their livelihood from raising livestock. The most important crop is rice, while other important products are peanuts, maize and cassava. Services provide employment for 0.5% of the population.
