= Route nationale 34 (Madagascar) =

Road in Madagascar

Location
- Country: Madagascar

Highway system
- Roads in Madagascar

Madagascar RN34

Route nationale 34 (RN 34) is a primary highway in Madagascar of 456 km, running from Antsirabe to Malaimbandy. It crosses the regions of Amoron'i Mania and Menabe.

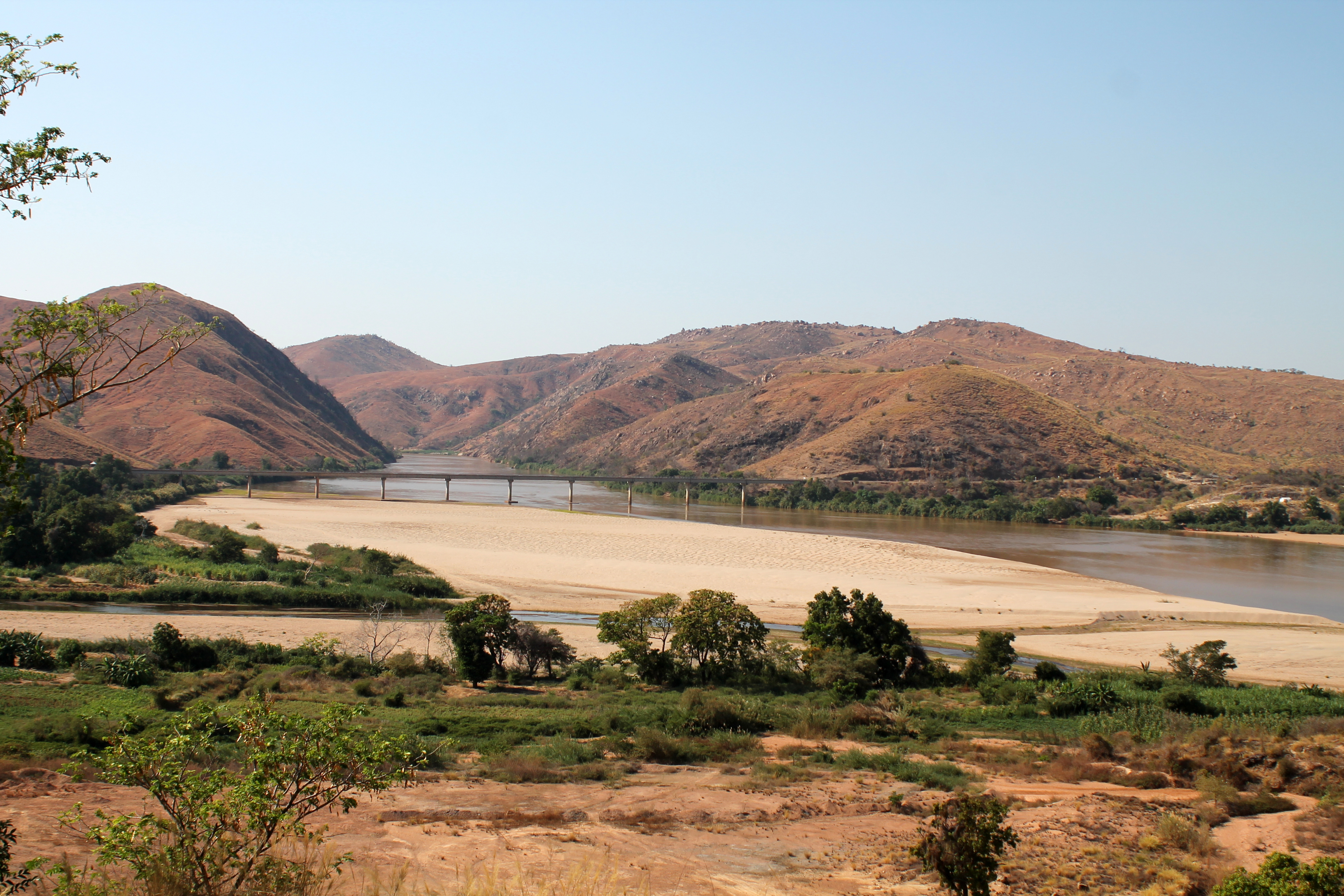
Bridge N34 over Tsiribihina

== Selected locations on route ==
(east to west)

- Antsirabe - (intersection with RN 7 from Antananarivo to Tulear)
- Andohanankivoka
- Miandrivazo
- Malaimbandy - (intersection with RN 34 to Morondava and Ambositra)

== See also ==
- List of roads in Madagascar
- Transport in Madagascar
