= Itremo =

- Location in Madagascar
- Coordinates: 20°35′S 46°38′E
- Country: Madagascar
- Region: Amoron'i Mania
- District: Ambatofinandrahana
- Elevation: 1,341 m (4,400 ft)

Population (2001)
  - Total: 7,000
- Time zone: UTC3 (EAT)

Itremo is a town and commune in Madagascar. It belongs to the district of Ambatofinandrahana, which is a part of Amoron'i Mania region. The population of the commune was estimated to be approximately 7,000 in the 2001 commune census.

Only primary schooling is available. The majority 70% of the population of the commune are farmers, while an additional 29.5% receives their livelihood from raising livestock. The most important crops are rice and peanuts, while other important agricultural products are beans and cassava. Services provide employment for 0.5% of the population.
