= Route nationale 35 (Madagascar) =

Road in Madagascar

Location
- Country: Madagascar

Highway system
- Roads in Madagascar

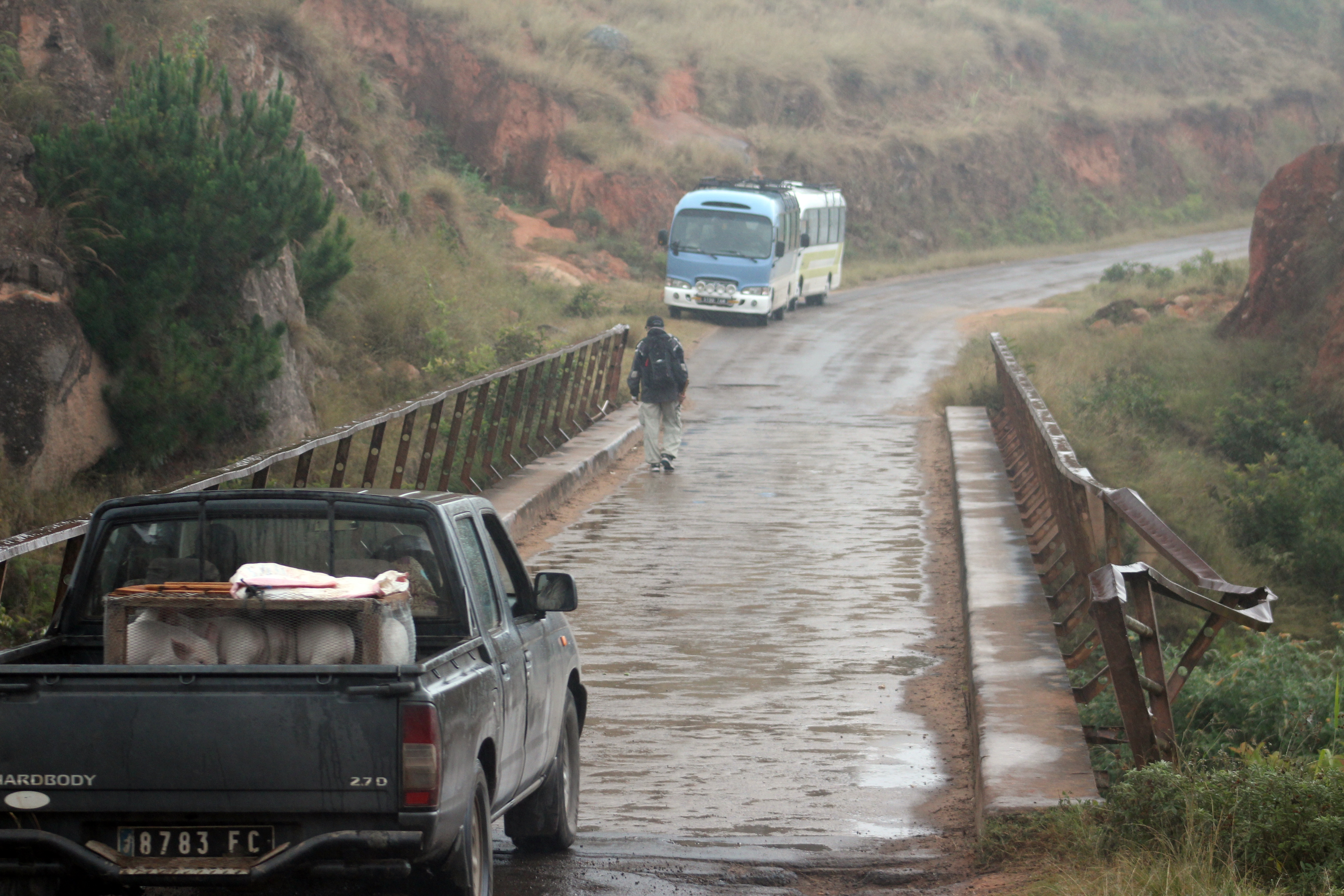
Madagascar RN35

Route nationale 35 (RN 35) is a primary highway in Madagascar of 456 km, running from Ivato, Ambositra to Morondava. It crosses the regions of Menabe and Amoron'i Mania.

It had been completely renovated in 2012. N35 paved from N7 to Ambatofinandrahana. Unpaved with 2 broken bridges requiring temporary repairs to traverse to Itremo. Bridge at Itremo impassable by vehicle. From Malaimbandy to Mandrosonoro unpaved except for a paved section a few kilometers with one section of road only difficultly traversable by 4 wheel drive vehicle or motorcycle. This information is based on personal experience with the road in June 2015.

== Selected locations on route ==
(east to west)

- Ivato, Ambositra - (intersection with RN 7 from Antsiranana to Tulear)
- Ambatofinandrahana
- Mandrosonoro
- Malaimbandy - (intersection with RN 34 to Miandrivazo and Antsirabe)
- Ankilizato - (intersection with RN 9 to Tulear)
- Mahabo
- Morondava - (intersection with RN 8 to Belo-sur-Tsiribihina)

== See also ==
- List of roads in Madagascar
- Transport in Madagascar
