= Morondava Airport =

Airport in Madagascar

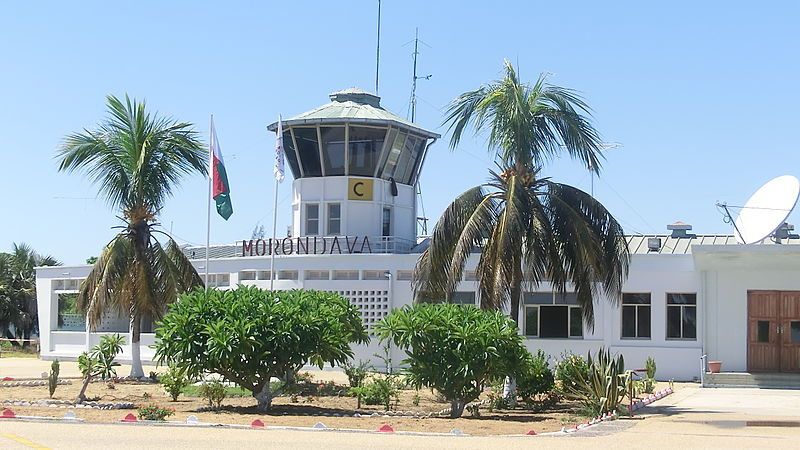
- IATA: MOQ; ICAO: FMMV

Summary
- Airport type: Public
- Operator: ADEMA (Aéroports de Madagascar)
- Serves: Morondava
- Location: Menabe, Madagascar
- Elevation AMSL: 30 ft (9.1 m)
- Coordinates: 20°17′05″S 44°19′03″E

Map
- Location within Madagascar

Runways
| Direction | Length | | Surface |
| Direction | ft | m | Surface |
|---|---|---|---|
| 10/28 | 4,921 | 1,500 | Asphalt |
| 14/32 | 4,413 | 1,345 | Asphalt |
- DAFIF

Morondava Airport is an airport in Morondava, Menabe Region, Madagascar (IATA: MOQ, ICAO: FMMV).

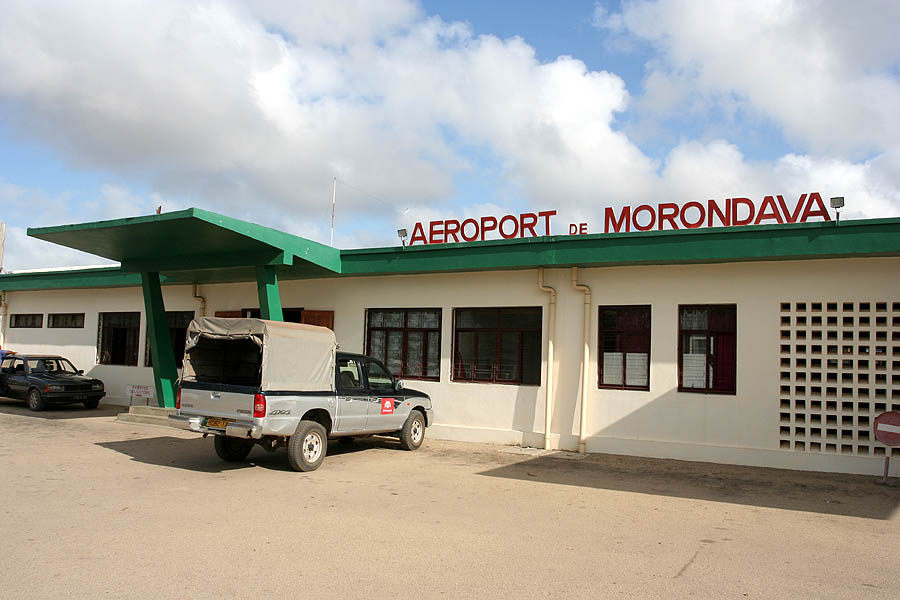
Front view of the Morondava Airport, Madagascar.

== Airlines and destinations ==
| Airlines | Destinations |
|---|---|
| Madagascar Airlines | Antananarivo |
