= Morondava River =

River in Madagascar

Morondava
- Map of Malagasy rivers.

Location
- Country: Madagascar
- Region: Menabe

Physical characteristics
- Source: Makay Massif
- Mouth
  - location: Indian Ocean, at Morondava (town)
  - coordinates: 22°20′00″S 44°15′00″E
- Length: 200 km (120 mi)
- Basin size: 6400 km2

Basin features
- Progression: Morondava, Dabara dam, Ambiky
- Tributaries
  - left: Fanikay, Sakamaly

The Morondava is a river in the Menabe region, located in western Madagascar. It originates on the Makay Massif and flows northwestwards into the Indian Ocean near a town named after the river.

== Dams ==
- The Dabara dam.
