= Ivato, Ambositra =

Ivato Ivato Centre
- Town
- Location within Madagascar
- Coordinates: 20°37′S 47°12′E
- Country: Madagascar
- Province: Fianarantsoa
- Region: Amoron'i Mania
- District: Ambositra

Area
  - Total: 204 km^{2} (79 sq mi)
- Elevation: 1,499 m (4,918 ft)

Population (2018)
  - Total: 22,745
  - Density: 9.01/km^{2} (23.3/sq mi)
- Time zone: UTC+03:00 (EAT)
- Postal code: 306

Ivato or Ivato Centre is a rural commune (town) in Madagascar. It belongs to the Ambositra District, which is a part of the Amoron'i Mania region.

== Geography ==
This town lies at the intersection of the Route nationale 35 to Morondava and the Route nationale 7 from Antananarivo to Fianarantsoa. It is approximately 15 km south of Ambositra.

== Population ==
The population of the commune was 22,745 in 2018. Primary and junior level secondary education are available in town. 75% of the population of the commune is farmers, while an additional 15% receives their livelihood from raising livestock. Services provide employment for the other 10% of the population.

== Crops ==
The most important crop is rice, while other important products are peanuts, beans, cassava and tomato.
