= Morondava =

- City
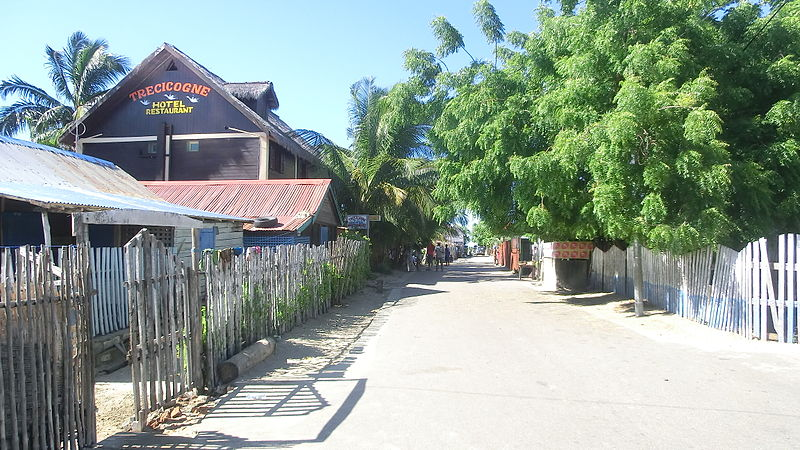

- Location within Madagascar
- Coordinates: 20°17′5″S 44°19′3″E
- Country: Madagascar
- Region: Menabe

Government
  - Mayor (interim): Désiré Armand Raharison

Area morondava-autrement.com
  - Total: 35 km^{2} (14 sq mi)
- Elevation coastal: 8 m (26 ft)

Population (2018 census)
  - Total: 53,510
  - Density: 1,500/km^{2} (4,000/sq mi)
- postal code: 619
- Area code: 95
- Climate: BSh

Morondava ([murunˈdav̥], from Malagasy: morona lava "long coast") is a city located in Menabe Region, of which it is the capital, in Madagascar. It is located in the delta of the Morondava River at 20°17′5″S 44°19′3″E. Its population as of the 2018 census, was 53,510.

== Population ==
The predominant tribe is the Sakalava, but there are also a few Betsileo, Tsimihety, Merina, and Makoa as well as Europeans.

== Transportation ==
Air Madagascar has regular scheduled flights to Morondava Airport. The main road to town has been renovated recently. With the new road established, a trip from Antananarivo to Morondava by taxi-brousse takes approximately 12 hours. Pirogues are consequently a popular mode of transport used to ferry people and goods along the coast, especially to Morombe.

== Roads ==
- RN 34 and RN 35 to Ivato, Ambositra and Antsirabe.
- RN 8 to Belo-sur-Tsiribihina.

== Ecology ==
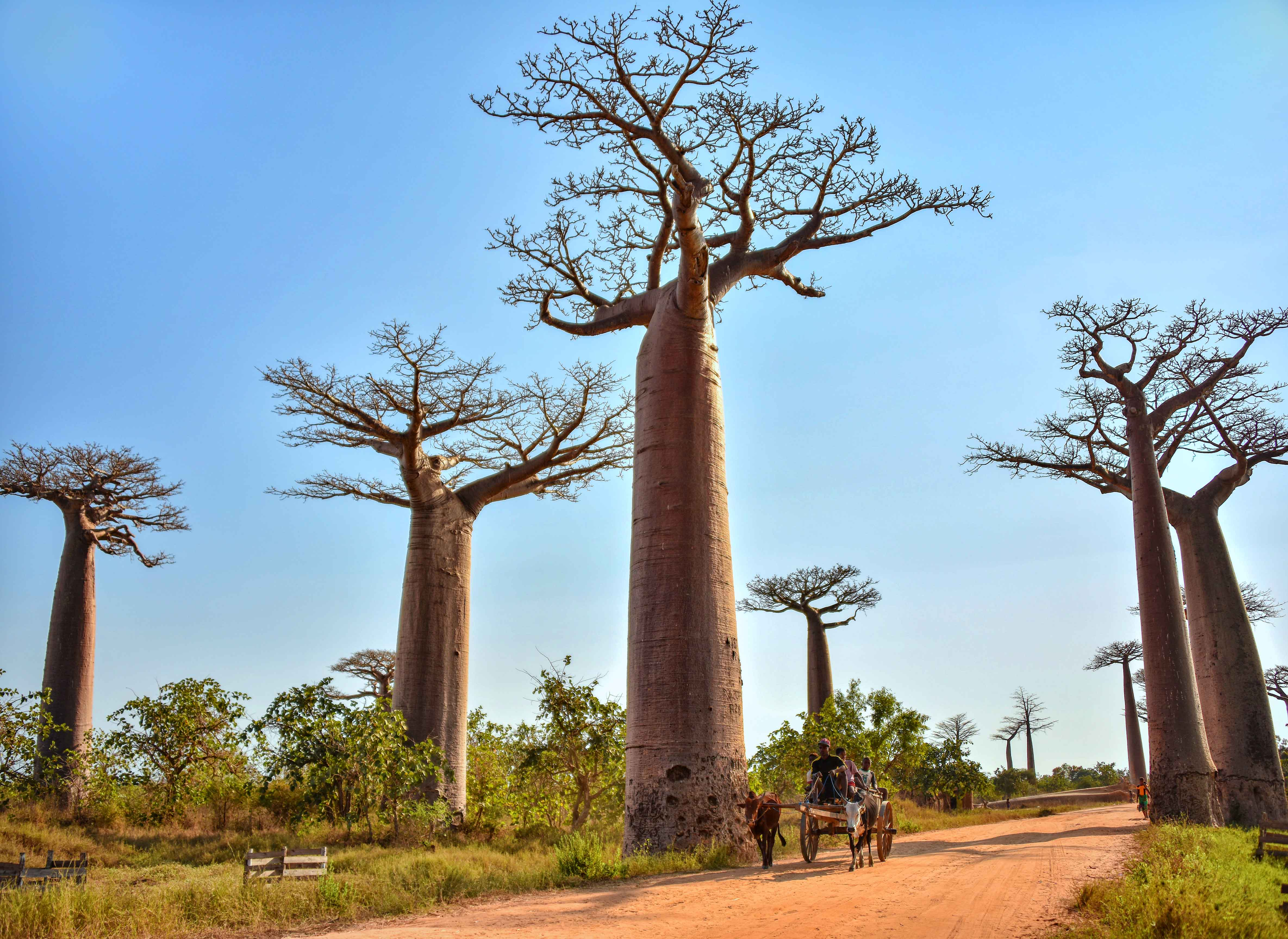
Avenue of Baobabs

The city is famous amongst other things for the spectacular Avenue of the Baobabs nearby at 20.251000°S 44.418403°E. These giant baobab trees are an 800-year-old legacy of the dense tropical forests that once throve here. Over the years, as the country's population grew, the forests were steadily cut down, leaving only the baobab trees, which the locals preserved for religious reasons. Today, deforestation still continues as large areas of this region, including some of few remaining baobabs, are cleared to make way for sugar cane plantations.

The Tsingy de Bemaraha Strict Nature Reserve, a UNESCO World Heritage Site, is located 150 km north of Morondava. The road from Morondava is poor, but Tsingy de Bemaraha is reachable by 4x4 in approximately 10 hours. In the South there is the Andranomena Reserve.

Kirindy Forest at 20.070000°S 44.601944°E is a nature reserve about 60 km from Morondava where many of the local species of lemurs as well as other plants and animals can be spotted during a day or night trip.

== Education ==
French international schools:

- École de l'Alliance

== Religion ==
- Roman Catholic Diocese (Cathedral of Mary Queen of the World).
- Fiangonana Jesosy Mamonjy Morondava
- FJKM - Fiangonan'i Jesoa Kristy eto Madagasikara (Church of Jesus Christ in Madagascar)
- FLM - Fiangonana Loterana Malagasy (Malagasy Lutheran Church)

There are also 4 mosques in Morandava.

== See also ==
- Tsingy de Bemaraha Strict Nature Reserve
- Madagascar dry deciduous forests
- Kirindy Mitea National Park (70 km south of Morondava)
- Betania, a beach village of this municipality.
- Avenue of the Baobabs, 20 km north of Morondava.
- Andranomena Special Reserve

== Climate ==
Morondova experiences a hot semi-arid (BSh) climate.

Climate data for Morondava (1991-2020)
Month	Jan	Feb	Mar	Apr	May	Jun	Jul	Aug	Sep	Oct	Nov	Dec	Year
Record high °C (°F)	34.9 (94.8)	34.9 (94.8)	34.9 (94.8)	34.9 (94.8)	34.9 (94.8)	34.8 (94.6)	34.4 (93.9)	34.8 (94.6)	34.9 (94.8)	35.5 (95.9)	35.7 (96.3)	35.0 (95.0)	35.7 (96.3)
Mean daily maximum °C (°F)	31.8 (89.2)	31.9 (89.4)	32.4 (90.3)	32.0 (89.6)	30.8 (87.4)	29.5 (85.1)	29.2 (84.6)	29.5 (85.1)	30.4 (86.7)	31.1 (88.0)	32.0 (89.6)	32.2 (90.0)	31.1 (88.0)
Daily mean °C (°F)	28.1 (82.6)	28.0 (82.4)	28.1 (82.6)	26.9 (80.4)	24.8 (76.6)	23.0 (73.4)	22.6 (72.7)	23.3 (73.9)	24.6 (76.3)	26.3 (79.3)	27.6 (81.7)	28.2 (82.8)	26.0 (78.8)
Mean daily minimum °C (°F)	24.4 (75.9)	24.1 (75.4)	23.8 (74.8)	21.7 (71.1)	18.7 (65.7)	16.4 (61.5)	16.0 (60.8)	17.1 (62.8)	19.0 (66.2)	21.3 (70.3)	23.2 (73.8)	24.2 (75.6)	20.8 (69.4)
Record low °C (°F)	20.5 (68.9)	20.5 (68.9)	18.5 (65.3)	13.9 (57.0)	9.7 (49.5)	9.2 (48.6)	9.0 (48.2)	10.0 (50.0)	11.3 (52.3)	13.0 (55.4)	16.2 (61.2)	17.3 (63.1)	9.0 (48.2)
Average precipitation mm (inches)	292.0 (11.50)	194.1 (7.64)	75.3 (2.96)	16.7 (0.66)	2.8 (0.11)	3.2 (0.13)	1.5 (0.06)	1.8 (0.07)	2.5 (0.10)	7.9 (0.31)	24.4 (0.96)	89.7 (3.53)	711.9 (28.03)
Average precipitation days (≥ 1.0 mm)	13.7	10.5	6.2	1.6	0.4	0.5	0.2	0.4	0.4	1.0	2.3	7.2	44.4
Mean monthly sunshine hours	269.3	241.6	287.8	290.0	302.5	289.4	297.6	310.0	298.1	322.1	313.2	283.4	3,505
Source: NOAA (sun, 1961-1990)

== International relations ==
Morondava is twinned with:

- Le Grand-Quevilly, France, since 1964.
