= Mampikony (disambiguation) =

Mampikony may refer to several places in Madagascar:

- Mampikony, a commune in Mampikony District, Sofia Region.
- Mampikony II, a commune in Mampikony District, Sofia Region.
- Mampikony, a district in Sofia Region.
