= Tsaratanana (disambiguation) =

Tsaratanana may refer to several places in Madagascar:

- Tsaratanana in Tsaratanana District, Betsiboka Region.
- Tsaratanana District in Betsiboka Region.
- Tsaratanana in Boriziny District, Sofia Region.
- Tsaratanana in Mandritsara District, Sofia Region.
- Tsaratanana in Ifanadiana District, Vatovavy.
- Tsaratanana, a village that is part of Vinaninkarena municipality, near Antsirabe

== Natural reserves ==
- Tsaratanana Reserve - a natural reserve and mountain in Diana Region.

== Airports ==
- Tsaratanana Airport - the airport of Tsaratanana, Betsiboka

== Animals ==
- Tsaratanana chameleon - a chameleon
