= Marotolana =

Marotolana or Marotaolana may mean several places in Madagascar:

- Marotolana, Ambanja, a commune in Ambanja District, Diana Region.
- Marotolana, Bealanana, a commune in Bealanana District, Sofia Region.
