= Marovato =

Marovato may refer to several municipalities in Madagascar:

- Marovato, Ambanja in Ambanja District, Diana Region
- Marovato, Andapa in Andapa District, Sava Region
- Belaoka Marovato in Andapa District, Sava Region
- Marovato, Boriziny in Boriziny (Port-Bergé) District, Sofia Region
- Marovato, Andilamena in Andilamena District, Alaotra-Mangoro Region
- Marovato, Tsiombe in Tsiombe District, Androy Region
- Marovato Befeno in Ambovombe District, Androy Region
- Marovato, is also the name of the main place of the municipality Ifasina III, in Atsinanana.
