= 1956 in the environment =

This is a list of notable events relating to the environment in 1956. They relate to environmental law, conservation, environmentalism and environmental issues.

Before the environmental movement, the most common phrase used for this concept was "environmental conservation".

== Events ==
- A strange new syndrome, Minamata disease, is first reported in Japan, which is later known to be caused by mercury poisoning.
- A number of protected areas were established in 1956, including Albany Wildlife Area in Wisconsin, Bora Special Reserve in Madagascar, and Cornell Biological Field Station. Etosha Pan's first rest camp (park) was also established in what is now Namibia.

=== July ===
- The Clean Air Act 1956 is given royal assent by Queen Elizabeth II on 5 July 1956, enacted in response to the Great Smog of London in December 1952.

=== August ===
- The United States Fish and Wildlife Act is signed by President Dwight Eisenhower and enters into effect.

== See also ==
- Human impact on the environment
- List of environmental issues
- List of years in the environment
