= Beandrarezona =

- Location in Madagascar
- Coordinates: 14°29′S 48°41′E
- Country: Madagascar
- Region: Sofia
- District: Bealanana
- Elevation: 938 m (3,077 ft)

Population (2001)
  - Total: 12,000
- Time zone: UTC3 (EAT)
- Postal code: 408

Beandrarezona is a rural municipality in Madagascar. It belongs to the district of Bealanana, which is a part of Sofia Region. The population of the commune was estimated to be approximately 12,000 in 2001 commune census.

Primary and junior level secondary education are available in town. The majority 54.7% of the population of the commune are farmers, while an additional 45% receives their livelihood from raising livestock. The most important crop is rice, while other important products are peanuts and beans. Services provide employment for 0.3% of the population.

== Geography ==
It is situated at 12 km from Bealanana and 61 km from Antananivo Haut.

== Infrastructure ==
Electricity and water supplies are absent in Beandrarezona, though a pico-central of 70 kw is presently being built.
