= Befandriana =

Befandriana can refer to several geographical entities on Madagascar:

- Befandriana Nord or Befandriana-Avaratra, a city and commune
  - Befandriana-Nord District
- Befandriana Sud or Befandriana Atsimo, a town and commune
