= Ardisia oligantha =

Ardisia oligantha is a name which has been given to several species of plants:

- Ardisia oligantha Baker, described in 1885, now known as Oncostemum oliganthum (Baker) Mez
- Ardisia oligantha Mez, described in 1902, an illegitimate later homonym
- Ardisia oligantha Elmer, described in 1912, an illegitimate later homonym replaced by Ardisia oligocarpa Merr.
- Ardisia oligantha (Gilg & Schellenb.) Taton, combined in 1979, an illegitimate later homonym replaced by Ardisia marcellanum Govaerts
