= Ambodimandresy =

- Location in Madagascar
- Coordinates: 14°47′S 48°5′E
- Country: Madagascar
- Region: Sofia
- District: Antsohihy

Area
  - Total: 900 km^{2} (350 sq mi)
- Elevation: 28 m (92 ft)

Population (2001)
  - Total: 10,000
  - Ethnicities: Tsimihety
- Time zone: UTC3 (EAT)

Ambodimandresy is a rural municipality in Madagascar. It belongs to the district of Antsohihy, which is a part of Sofia Region. The population of the commune was estimated to be approximately 10,000 in 2001 commune census.

The municipality covers 14 villages (fokontany) : Ambodimandesy, Ambohimandririna, Antambohitra, Antombodriha, Ambodimanga-Bora, Antanamarina, Zafibelaza, Antanambao-Nord, Andampy, Andamoty, Andrafialava, Ambalarano, Ambalahonko and Mangaoko. It is situated at 3 km North of the National Road 6 that links this municipality to Antsohihy (29 km). It is principally inhabited by the Tsimihety
