= Marotandrano Special Reserve =

- IUCN category IV (habitat/species management area)
- Location within Madagascar
- Location: Mandritsara District, Sofia Region, Madagascar
- Coordinates: 16.167°S 48.85°E
- Area: 671.19 km^{2} (259.15 sq mi)
- Designation: Special reserve
- Designated: 20 February 1956
- Governing body: Madagascar National Parks

Marotandrano Special Reserve is a wildlife reserve in Mandritsara, Sofia Region, Madagascar. It is 10 km from Marotandrano and 42 km from Mandritsara.

The reserve covers an area of 67,119 hectares. About 95% of the local population is of the Tsimihety ethnic group.

The reserve is rich in wildlife consisting of a variety of animal species, different mammals, lemurs, amphibians, birds and reptiles. The climate has two seasons, experiencing warm, humid and rainy weather from November to March, when some of the areas in the reserve will be inaccessible, and then the dry and cool from April to September. There are two large rivers in the region: Simianona and Sofia. The park is home to 140 species of birds, 12 species of lemurs, and carnivorous mammals including fossa.

The vegetation is mid-altitude, dense, humid evergreen forest, lying at the western limit of such habitat. Trees of Tambourissa, Dalbergia, Oncostemum and Canarium dominate the upper layer, while the mid-stratum is characterized by tree-ferns, bamboo-lianas and palms. On the ridges, the lower vegetation layer is dense and characterized by thick grass clumps.
