= Ambodiadabo =

Ambodiadabo may rever to multiple places in Madagascar:

- Ambodiadabo, a commune in Bealanana District, Sofia Region
- Ambodiadabo, a commune in Mandritsara District, Sofia Region
