= Anahidrano =

- Location in Madagascar
- Coordinates: 15°5′S 47°56′E
- Country: Madagascar
- Region: Sofia
- District: Antsohihy
- Elevation: 38 m (125 ft)

Population (2001)
  - Total: 15,000
- Time zone: UTC3 (EAT)

Anahidrano is a town and commune (Malagasy: kaominina) in Madagascar. It belongs to the district of Antsohihy, which is a part of Sofia Region. The population of the commune was estimated to be approximately 15,000 in 2001 commune census.

Anahidrano lies on the National road 6 to Antsiranana and Antsohihy

Primary and junior level secondary education are available in town. The majority 62% of the population of the commune are farmers, while an additional 30% receives their livelihood from raising livestock. The most important crop is rice, while other important products are peanuts, maize and cassava. Services provide employment for 1% of the population. Additionally fishing employs 7% of the population.
