= Bora Special Reserve =

Wildlife preserve in the Sofia Region of Madagascar

- IUCN category IV (habitat/species management area)
- Location within Madagascar
- Location: Northern Madagascar
- Coordinates: 14°55′S 48°15′E
- Area: 4,841 hectares (11,960 acres)
- Established: 1956
- Governing body: Parcs Nationaux Madagascar – ANGAP

Bora Special Reserve is a wildlife reserve in the Sofia Region of Madagascar, between the villages of Antsohihy and Bealanana. Bora is in a transition zone between eastern humid forests and western dry forests and the reserve and has many endemic species including six lemur species, twenty birds and over 150 species of endemic plants.

== Geography ==
This 4,841 hectares (11,960 acres) reserve is in the north-west of Madagascar, 35 kilometres (22 mi) from Antsohihy. In the north the park is accessible by the tarmaced road, RN31, which runs between Antsohihy and Bealalana, and the southern part of the reserve is accessible by the road between Befandriana-Nord and Antsohihy. The landscape is mainly flat with volcanic rocks and small hills and on the eastern border is the Anjingo River with its tributary the Bemahavony brook. There are two seasons; a cool dry season from May to October and a warm rainy season for the rest of the year.

The prominent ethnic group is the Tsimihety people who farm in and around the reserve.

== Flora and fauna ==
Bora is in a transition zone between eastern humid forests and western dry forests which can be seen in the vegetation and fauna which belongs to both types. Dry deciduous forest is the dominant habitat in the reserve and there are also areas of degraded secondary forest, gallery forest and savannah, as well as some areas converted into rice paddies. Nearly three hundred species of plants have been recorded and more than half are endemic. There is also six species of lemur (four nocturnal and two diurnal), 48 species of birds (twenty endemic), fifteen reptiles species, five species of amphibians and 160 families of arthropods.

== Threats ==
The reserve is under threat from hunting for bush meat, illegal tree felling, plantations, rice paddies, and setting fire (known as tavy) to land to encourage grass for grazing herds of zebu.

== See also ==
- List of national parks of Madagascar
