= Ambolidibe Est =

- Location in Madagascar
- Coordinates: 15°6′S 48°48′E
- Country: Madagascar
- Region: Sofia
- District: Befandriana-Nord
- Elevation: 835 m (2,740 ft)

Population (2001)
  - Total: 17,000
- Time zone: UTC3 (EAT)

Ambolidibe (also known as Ambolidibe Est or Ambolidibe Atsinanana) is a town and commune (Malagasy: kaominina) in Madagascar. It belongs to the district of Befandriana-Nord, which is a part of Sofia Region. The population of the commune was estimated to be approximately 17,000 in 2001 commune census.

Only primary schooling is available. The majority (99%) of the population of the commune are farmers, while an additional 0.5% receive their livelihood from raising livestock. The most important crops are rice and vanilla; also coffee is an important agricultural product. Services provide employment for 0.5% of the population.
