= Bekoratsaka =

- Location in Madagascar
- Coordinates: 16°6′S 47°30′E
- Country: Madagascar
- Region: Sofia
- District: Mampikony
- Elevation: 83 m (272 ft)

Population (2001)
  - Total: 32,000
- Time zone: UTC3 (EAT)

Bekoratsaka is a town and commune (Malagasy: kaominina) in Madagascar. It belongs to the district of Mampikony, which is a part of the Sofia Region. The population of the commune was estimated to be approximately 32,000 in the 2001 commune census.

Primary and junior level secondary education are available in the town. The majority (55%) of the population of the commune are farmers, while an additional 40% receive their livelihood from raising livestock. The most important crops are rice and catechu seeds, while other important agricultural products are bananas, cassava and cowpeas. Services provide employment for 4% of the population. Fishing employs 1% of the population.
