= Ampasimatera =

- Location in Madagascar
- Coordinates: 15°56′S 47°45′E
- Country: Madagascar
- Region: Sofia
- District: Mampikony
- Elevation: 52 m (171 ft)

Population (2001)
  - Total: 21,000
- Time zone: UTC3 (EAT)

Ampasimatera is a town and commune (Malagasy: kaominina) in Madagascar. It belongs to the district of Mampikony, a part of Sofia Region. The commune population was estimated to be approximately 21,000 in 2001 commune census.

Primary and junior-level secondary education are available in town. The majority, 96% of the commune's population, are farmers, while an additional 2% receive their livelihood from raising livestock. The most important crop is rice, while other important products are cotton and cassava. Services provide employment for 1% of the population. Additionally, fishing employs 1% of the population.
