= Analila =

- Location in Madagascar
- Coordinates: 14°27′S 49°3′E
- Country: Madagascar
- Region: Sofia
- District: Bealanana
- Elevation: 1,220 m (4,000 ft)

Population (2001)
  - Total: 16,000
- Time zone: UTC3 (EAT)

Analila is a town and commune (Malagasy: kaominina) in Madagascar. It belongs to the district of Bealanana, which is a part of Sofia Region. The population of the commune was estimated to be approximately 16,000 in 2001 commune census.

Only primary schooling is available. The majority 99% of the population of the commune are farmers. The most important crop is rice, while other important products are sugarcane, beans, maize and cassava. Services provide employment for 1% of the population.
