= Antsakanalabe =

- Location in Madagascar
- Coordinates: 15°25′S 48°17′E
- Country: Madagascar
- Region: Sofia
- District: Befandriana-Nord
- Elevation: 218 m (715 ft)

Population (2001)
  - Total: 11,000
- Time zone: UTC3 (EAT)

Antsakanalabe is a town and commune (Malagasy: kaominina) in Madagascar. It belongs to the district of Befandriana-Nord, which is a part of Sofia Region. The population of the commune was estimated to be approximately 11,000 in 2001 commune census.

Only primary schooling is available. The majority 80% of the population of the commune are farmers. The most important crop is rice, while other important products are peanuts, wheat, maize and cassava. Services provide employment for 20% of the population.
