= Antsoha, Mandritsara =

Antsoha
- Location in Madagascar
- Coordinates: 15°46′S 48°51′E
- Country: Madagascar
- Region: Sofia
- District: Mandritsara
- Elevation: 483 m (1,585 ft)

Population (2001)
  - Total: 11,000
- Time zone: UTC3 (EAT)

Antsoha is a town and commune (Malagasy: kaominina) in Madagascar. It belongs to the district of Mandritsara, which is a part of Sofia Region. The population of the commune was estimated to be approximately 11,000 in 2001 commune census.

Only primary schooling is available. The majority 95% of the population of the commune are farmers. The most important crops are rice and peanuts; also raffia palm is an important agricultural product. Services provide employment for 5% of the population.
