= Antsamaka =

- Location in Madagascar
- Coordinates: 14°35′S 48°38′E
- Country: Madagascar
- Region: Sofia
- District: Bealanana
- Elevation: 1,175 m (3,855 ft)

Population (2001)
  - Total: 8,000
- Time zone: UTC3 (EAT)

Antsamaka is a town and commune (Malagasy: kaominina) in Madagascar. It belongs to the district of Bealanana, which is a part of Sofia Region. The population of the commune was estimated to be approximately 8,000 in 2001 commune census.

Only primary schooling is available. The majority 99% of the population of the commune are farmers. The most important crops are rice and peanuts; also beans is an important agricultural product. Services provide employment for 1% of the population.
