= Omphalepia dujardini =

Scientific classification
- Kingdom: Animalia
- Phylum: Arthropoda
- Class: Insecta
- Order: Lepidoptera
- Family: Pyralidae
- Genus: Omphalepia
- Species: O. dujardini

Binomial name
- Omphalepia dujardini Viette, 1967

Species of moth

Omphalepia dujardini is a species of snout moth in the genus Omphalepia. It is known from Madagascar (the type location is Andranomena).
