= Tampoketsa Analamaitso Reserve =

Wildlife reserve in Madagascar

- IUCN category IV (habitat/species management area)
- Location within Madagascar
- Location: Sofia Region, Madagascar
- Nearest city: Sahalentina
- Coordinates: 16°16′00″S 48°15′00″E
- Area: 171.5 km^{2} (66.2 sq mi)
- Established: 28 October 1958
- Governing body: Madagascar National Parks

Tampoketsa Analamaitso Reserve is a wildlife reserve of Madagascar located in the Sofia Region. It covers 17 150 ha in three districts: Port Bergé, Mandritsara and Mampikony.

This reserve covers humid dense forests of average altitude and dense dry forests in the west.

Three species of lemurs can be found in this reserve – the brown mouse lemur (Microcebus rufus), dwarf lemur (Cheirogaleus sp.), and common brown lemur (Eulemur fulvus fulvus).

This reserve is of difficult access and the closest village Sahalentina at 41.6 km distance cannot be reached in the rain season from November to March.
