= Amboaboa =

- Location in Madagascar
- Coordinates: 15°56′S 48°43′E
- Country: Madagascar
- Region: Sofia
- District: Mandritsara
- Elevation: 327 m (1,073 ft)

Population (2001)
  - Total: 13,000
- Time zone: UTC3 (EAT)

Amboaboa is a town and commune (Malagasy: kaominina) in Madagascar. It belongs to the district of Mandritsara, which is a part of Sofia Region. The population of the commune was estimated to be approximately 13,000 in 2001 commune census.

Only primary schooling is available. The majority (99%) of the population of the commune are farmers. The most important crop is rice, while other important products are sugarcane, maize and cassava. Services provide employment for 1% of the population.
