= Boophis englaenderi =

Conservation status
- Vulnerable (IUCN 3.1)

Scientific classification
- Kingdom: Animalia
- Phylum: Chordata
- Class: Amphibia
- Order: Anura
- Family: Mantellidae
- Genus: Boophis
- Species: B. englaenderi

Binomial name
- Boophis englaenderi Glaw & Vences, 1994

Species of frog

Boophis englaenderi is a species of frog in the family Mantellidae. It is endemic to Madagascar, found in Marojejy National Park and Andrakata. Its natural habitats are subtropical or tropical moist lowland forests and heavily degraded former forest. It is threatened by habitat loss for agriculture, timber extraction, charcoal manufacturing, invasive eucalyptus and expanding human settlement.
