= Ambodisikidy =

- Location in Madagascar
- Coordinates: 14°14′S 48°29′E
- Country: Madagascar
- Region: Sofia
- District: Bealanana
- Elevation: 844 m (2,769 ft)

Population (2001)
  - Total: 10,000
- Time zone: UTC3 (EAT)

Ambodisikidy is a town and commune (Malagasy: kaominina) in Madagascar. It belongs to the district of Bealanana, which is a part of Sofia Region. The population of the commune was estimated to be approximately 10,000 in 2001 commune census.

Primary and junior level secondary education are available in town. The majority 99.5% of the population of the commune are farmers. The most important crops are rice and coffee, while other important agricultural products are sugarcane, beans and cassava. Services provide employment for 0.5% of the population.
