= Ambimadiro =

- Location in Madagascar
- Coordinates: 14°36′S 48°5′E
- Country: Madagascar
- Region: Sofia
- District: Antsohihy
- Elevation: 35 m (115 ft)

Population (2001)
  - Total: 10,000
- Time zone: UTC3 (EAT)

Ambimadiro is a town and commune (Malagasy: kaominina) in Madagascar. It belongs to the district of Antsohihy, which is a part of Sofia Region. The population of the commune was estimated to be approximately 10,000 in 2001 commune census.

Only primary schooling is available. The majority 60% of the population of the commune are farmers, while an additional 25% receives their livelihood from raising livestock. The most important crops are rice and coffee, while other important agricultural products are bananas, maize and cassava. Services provide employment for 5% of the population. Additionally fishing employs 10% of the population.
