= Ankiabe Salohy =

- Location in Madagascar
- Coordinates: 15°36′S 48°43′E
- Country: Madagascar
- Region: Sofia
- District: Mandritsara
- Elevation: 320 m (1,050 ft)

Population (2001)
  - Total: 22,000
- Time zone: UTC3 (EAT)

Ankiabe Salohy is a town and commune (Malagasy: kaominina) in Madagascar. It belongs to the district of Mandritsara, which is a part of Sofia Region. The population of the commune was estimated to be approximately 22,000 in 2001 commune census.

Primary and junior level secondary education are available in town. The majority (87%) of the population of the commune are farmers. The most important crop is rice, while other important products are coffee, sugarcane, cloves and vanilla. Services provide employment for 6% of the population. Additionally fishing employs 7% of the population.
