= Andreba =

- Location in Madagascar
- Coordinates: 14°35′S 48°11′E
- Country: Madagascar
- Region: Sofia
- District: Antsohihy
- Elevation: 48 m (157 ft)

Population (2001)
  - Total: 13,000
- Time zone: UTC3 (EAT)

Andreba is a town and commune (Malagasy: kaominina) in Madagascar. It belongs to the district of Antsohihy, which is a part of Sofia Region. The population of the commune was estimated to be approximately 13,000 in 2001 commune census. It on the shore of Lake Alaotra.

Primary and junior level secondary education are available in town. The majority 60% of the population of the commune are farmers, while an additional 25% receives their livelihood from raising livestock. The most important crop is rice, while other important products are coffee and pepper. Services provide employment for 3% of the population. Additionally fishing employs 12% of the population.
