= Tanandava =

Tanandava may refer to one of the following locations in Madagascar:

- Tanandava, Andapa in Andapa District, Sava Region, Madagascar
- Tanandava, Bekily in Bekily District, Androy Region, Madagascar

== See also ==
- Tanandava Sud (Tanandava Atsimo) in Amboasary Sud District, Anosy Region, Madagascar
