= Ambonomby =

- Location in Madagascar
- Coordinates: 14°22′S 49°3′E
- Country: Madagascar
- Region: Sofia
- District: Bealanana
- Elevation: 1,303 m (4,275 ft)

Population (2001)
  - Total: 10,000
- Time zone: UTC3 (EAT)

Ambonomby or Ambovonomby is a town and commune (Malagasy: kaominina) in Madagascar. It belongs to the district of Bealanana, which is a part of Sofia Region. The population of the commune was estimated to be approximately 10,000 in 2001 commune census.

Primary and junior level secondary education are available in town. The majority (98%) of the population of the commune are farmers. The most important crop is rice, while other important products are sugarcane and cassava. Services provide employment for 2% of the population.
