= Ankarongana =

- Location in Madagascar
- Coordinates: 15°25′S 48°55′E
- Country: Madagascar
- Region: Sofia
- District: Befandriana-Nord
- Elevation: 590 m (1,940 ft)

Population (2001)
  - Total: 17,000
- Time zone: UTC3 (EAT)

Ankarongana is a town and commune (Malagasy: kaominina) in Madagascar. It belongs to the district of Befandriana-Nord, which is a part of Sofia Region. The population of the commune was estimated to be approximately 17,000 in 2001 commune census.

Primary and junior level secondary education are available in town. The majority 98% of the population of the commune are farmers. The most important crops are rice and coffee, while other important agricultural products are sugarcane and cassava. Services provide employment for 2% of the population.
