= Morafeno, Befandriana-Nord =

Morafeno
- Location in Madagascar
- Coordinates: 15°29′S 48°12′E
- Country: Madagascar
- Region: Sofia
- District: Befandriana-Nord
- Elevation: 201 m (659 ft)

Population (2001)
  - Total: 21,000
- Time zone: UTC3 (EAT)

Morafeno is a rural municipality in Madagascar. It belongs to the district of Befandriana-Nord, which is a part of Sofia Region. The population of the commune was estimated to be approximately 21,000 in 2001 commune census.

Only primary schooling is available. It is also a site of industrial-scale mining. The majority 98% of the population of the commune are farmers, while an additional 2% receives their livelihood from raising livestock. The most important crop is rice, while other important products are peanuts, maize and cassava.
