= Andohajango =

- Location in Madagascar
- Coordinates: 15°54′S 48°30′E
- Country: Madagascar
- Region: Sofia
- District: Mandritsara
- Elevation: 357 m (1,171 ft)

Population (2001)
  - Total: 13,000
- Time zone: UTC3 (EAT)

Andohajango is a town or commune (Malagasy: kaominina) in Madagascar. It is in the district of Mandritsara, which is a part of Sofia Region. The population of the commune was estimated at 13,000 in the 2001 commune census.

There is a primary and junior level secondary school in the town. The vast majority (99%) of the population of the town are farmers. The most important crop is rice, while other important products are peanut, maize, cassava and raffia palm. Services provide employment for the remaining 1% of the population.
