= Maroamalona =

- Location in Madagascar
- Coordinates: 15°18′S 48°40′E
- Country: Madagascar
- Region: Sofia
- District: Befandriana-Nord
- Elevation: 484 m (1,588 ft)

Population (2001)
  - Total: 11,000
- Time zone: UTC3 (EAT)

Maroamalona is a town and commune (Malagasy: kaominina) in Madagascar. It belongs to the district of Befandriana-Nord, which is a part of Sofia Region. The population of the commune was estimated to be approximately 11,000 in 2001 commune census.

Primary and junior level secondary education are available in town. The majority 96% of the population of the commune are farmers, while an additional 4% receives their livelihood from raising livestock. The most important crop is rice, while other important products are peanuts, maize, cassava and vanilla.
