= Antsakabary =

- Location in Madagascar
- Coordinates: 15°3′S 48°56′E
- Country: Madagascar
- Region: Sofia
- District: Befandriana-Nord
- Elevation: 596 m (1,955 ft)

Population (2001)
  - Total: 22,000
- Time zone: UTC3 (EAT)
- Postal code: 409

Carte bassin Sofia

Antsakabary is a rural municipality in Madagascar. It belongs to the district of Befandriana-Nord, which is a part of Sofia Region. The population of the commune was estimated to be approximately 22,000 in 2001 commune census.

Primary and junior level secondary education are available in town. Farming and raising livestock provides employment for 49% and 49% of the working population. The most important crops are rice and vanilla; also coffee is an important agricultural product. Services provide employment for 2% of the population.

== River ==
Antsakabary is situated at the Sofia River.
