= Ambohitoaka =

- Location in Madagascar
- Coordinates: 16°1′S 47°39′E
- Country: Madagascar
- Region: Sofia
- District: Mampikony
- Elevation: 49 m (161 ft)

Population (2001)
  - Total: 23,000
- Time zone: UTC3 (EAT)

Ambohitoaka is a town and commune (Malagasy: kaominina) in Madagascar. It belongs to the district of Mampikony, which is a part of Sofia Region. The population of the commune was estimated to be approximately 23,000 in 2001 commune census.

Ambohitoaka is served by a local airport. Primary and junior level secondary education are available in town. The majority 90% of the population of the commune are farmers. The most important crops are rice and onions, while other important agricultural products are cotton and tobacco. Industry and services provide employment for 3% and 2% of the population, respectively. Additionally fishing employs 5% of the population.
