= WMP (disambiguation) =

Windows Media Player is a media player and media library application by Microsoft.

WMP may also refer to:

- Warner Music Poland, a record label
- Wealth management product, a financial product sold in China
- West Midlands Police, a police force in England
- Western Malayo-Polynesian languages, a group of languages
- Whole milk powder, a manufactured dairy product
- World Matchplay (darts), a professional darts tournament
- Mampikony Airport (IATA: WMP), an airport in Madagascar
- World Mercury Project, a US American activist group since 2007 dedicated to ending exposure to neurotoxic mercury in fish, medical products, dental amalgams and vaccines, later renamed as Children's Health Defense
