= Antsahabe =

- Location in Madagascar
- Coordinates: 14°48′S 48°23′E
- Country: Madagascar
- Region: Sofia
- District: Antsohihy
- Elevation: 295 m (968 ft)

Population (2001)
  - Total: 11,000
- Time zone: UTC3 (EAT)

Antsahabe is a town and commune (Malagasy: kaominina) in Madagascar. It belongs to the district of Antsohihy, which is a part of Sofia Region. The population of the commune was estimated to be approximately 11,000 in 2001 commune census.

Only primary schooling is available. Farming and raising livestock provides employment for 40% and 20% of the working population. The most important crop is rice, while another important product is raffia palm. Services provide employment for 2% of the population. Additionally fishing employs 38% of the population.
