= Manampaneva =

- Location in Madagascar
- Coordinates: 16°3′S 48°41′E
- Country: Madagascar
- Region: Sofia
- District: Mandritsara
- Elevation: 517 m (1,696 ft)

Population (2001)
  - Total: 9,000
- Time zone: UTC3 (EAT)

Manampaneva is a town and commune (Malagasy: kaominina) in Madagascar. It belongs to the district of Mandritsara, which is a part of Sofia Region. The population of the commune was estimated to be approximately 9,000 in 2001 commune census.

Only primary schooling is available in Manampaneva. 96% of the population of the commune are farmers, while an additional 3.75% receives their livelihood from raising livestock. The most important crops are rice and peanuts, while other important agricultural products are maize and cassava. Services provide employment for only 0.25% of the population.
