= Antsirabe Afovoany =

- Location in Madagascar
- Coordinates: 15°57′S 48°58′E
- Country: Madagascar
- Region: Sofia
- District: Mandritsara
- Elevation: 372 m (1,220 ft)

Population (2001)
  - Total: 13,000
- Time zone: UTC3 (EAT)

Antsirabe Afovoany is a town and commune (Malagasy: kaominina) in Madagascar. It belongs to the district of Mandritsara, which is a part of Sofia Region. The population of the commune was estimated to be approximately 13,000 in 2001 commune census.

Primary and junior level secondary education are available in town. The majority of the population are farmers.The most important crop is rice, while other important products are coffee, cloves, maize and cassava. Services provide employment for 1% of the population.

It has a average elevation of 380 meters (1,247 feet) above sea level. It features warm-climate all year round, with the highest temperature being recorded in November (85°F), and lowest in August (60°F).
