= Bealanana District =

- District
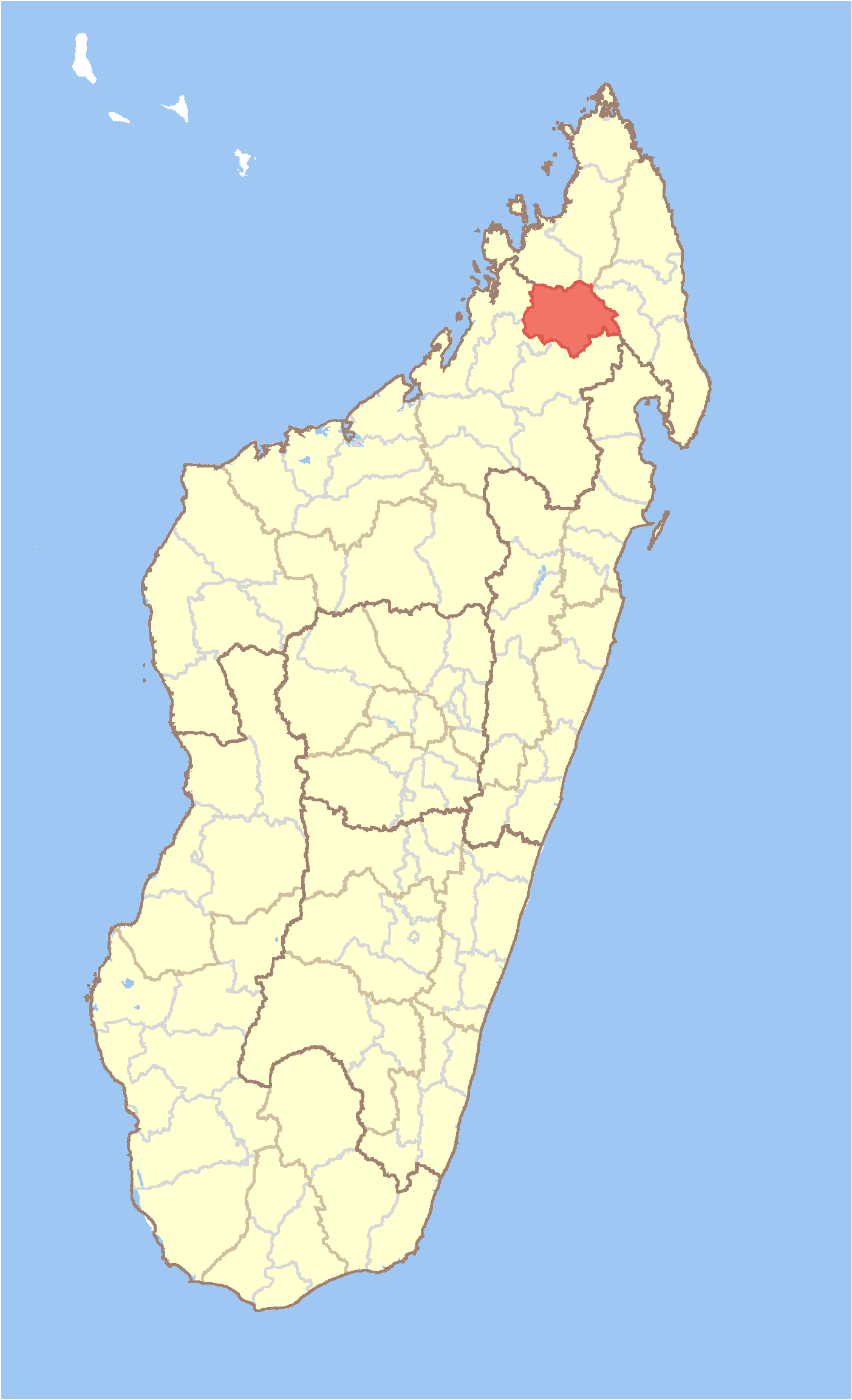
- Location in Madagascar
- Coordinates: 14°29′S 48°52′E
- Country: Madagascar
- Region: Sofia

Area
  - Total: 6,543 km^{2} (2,526 sq mi)

Population (2020 estimate)
  - Total: 201,836
  - Density: 30.85/km^{2} (79.89/sq mi)
  - Ethnicities: Tsimihety
- Time zone: UTC3 (EAT)
- Postal code: 408

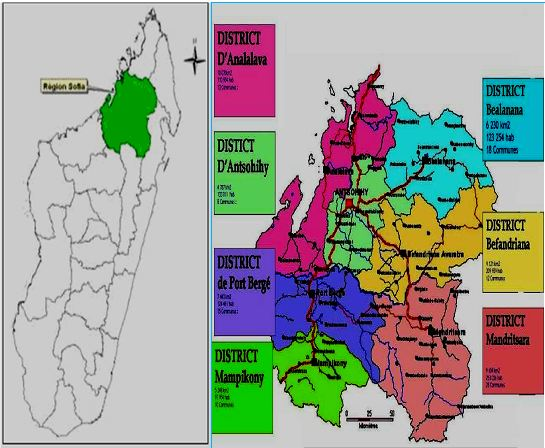
The districts of Sofia

Bealanana is a district in northern Madagascar. It is a part of Sofia Region and borders the districts of Ambanja in north, Ambilobe in northeast, Andapa in east, Befandriana-Nord in south, Antsohihy in southwest and Analalava in west. The area is 6,543 km^{2} (2,526 sq mi) and the population was estimated to be 201,836 in 2020.

== Communes ==
The district is further divided into 13 communes:

- Ambalaromba
- Ambatoriha
- Ambatosia
- Ambodiadabo
- Ambodisikidy
- Ambonomby
- Analila
- Antananivo Haut
- Antsamaka
- Bealanana
- Beandrarezona
- Mangidrano
- Marotolana

== Roads ==
Bealanana is connected with the rest of the country by the RN 31 that leads from Bealanana to the junction with the RN 6 near Andrafia.
