= Mangidrano =

- Location in Madagascar
- Coordinates: 14°17′S 48°58′E
- Country: Madagascar
- Region: Sofia
- District: Bealanana

Area
  - Total: 115 km^{2} (44 sq mi)
- Elevation: 1,207 m (3,960 ft)

Population (2001)
  - Total: 13,000
- Time zone: UTC3 (EAT)
- Postal code: 408

Mangidrano or Mangindrano is a rural municipality in Madagascar. It belongs to the district of Bealanana, which is a part of Sofia Region. The population of the commune was estimated to be approximately 13,000 in the 2001 commune census.

Primary and junior level secondary education are available in town. The majority 98.5% of the population of the commune are farmers. The most important crop is rice, while other important products are maize and cassava. Services provide employment for 1.5% of the population.

== Fokontany (villages) ==
Four fokontany (villages) are part of this municipality: Mangidrano, Soatanana, Ampitilova and Ambohimetaka.
