= Amborondolo =

- Location in Madagascar
- Coordinates: 16°6′S 48°29′E
- Country: Madagascar
- Region: Sofia
- District: Mandritsara
- Elevation: 390 m (1,280 ft)

Population (2001)
  - Total: 4,000
- Time zone: UTC3 (EAT)

Amborondolo is a town and commune (Malagasy: kaominina) in Madagascar. It belongs to the district of Mandritsara, which is a part of Sofia Region. The population of the commune was estimated to be approximately 4,000 in 2001 commune census.

It only provides primary schooling. The majority 99.5% of the population of the commune are farmers. The most important crops are rice and sweet peppers, while other important agricultural products are peanuts, sugarcane and cassava. Services provide employment for 0.5% of the population.
