= Ambararata =

- Location in Madagascar
- Coordinates: 15°1′S 48°38′E
- Country: Madagascar
- Region: Sofia
- District: Befandriana-Nord
- Elevation: 1,188 m (3,898 ft)

Population (2001)
  - Total: c. 13,000
- Time zone: UTC3 (EAT)

Ambararata is a town and commune (Malagasy: kaominina) in Madagascar. It belongs to the district of Befandriana-Nord, which is a part of Sofia Region. The population of the commune was estimated to be around 13,000 in 2001 commune census.

Primary and junior level secondary education are available in town. The majority 98% of the population of the commune are farmers. The most important crop is rice, while other important products are maize, cassava and barley. Services provide employment for 2% of the population.

== Etymology ==
The word 'barararata' means a small bamboo that grows in or near water (scientific name: Phragmites communis). The plant is a tall grass or reed found in marshes, at the edges of ponds and rivers, the same as volotara and katsaroka. It is used by the Betsileo people to treat malaria and in legends it is believed to be near where the pygmy Vazimba people dwell. In Madagascar there are 81 places that contain the word 'barararata' in their title.

== Economics ==
The currency used in this region is the Malagasy ariary (MGA). The GDP per capita in 2018 was $900 GDP (PPP) per capita.

== Airport ==
The closest airport is Ivato Airport, Antananarivo (TNR), 87.71 km away. Toamasina Airport (TMM) is 164.81 km away.

| Type | Airport name | City | IATA code | GPS code | Distance |
|---|---|---|---|---|---|
| Medium | Ivato Airport | Antananarivo | TNR | FMMI | 87.71 km |
| Medium | Toamasina Airport | | TMM | FMMT | 164.81 km |
| Medium | Sainte Marie Airport | | SMS | FMMS | 237.18 km |
| Medium | Mananara Nord Airport | Mananara Nord | WMR | FMNC | 296.75 km |
| Medium | Miandrivazo Airport | | ZVA | FMMN | 299.88 km |
| Medium | Amborovy Airport | | MJN | FMNM | 311.54 km |
| Medium | Mananjary Airport | | MNJ | FMSM | 351.07 km |
| Medium | Maroantsetra Airport | | WMN | FMNR | 354.39 km |
| Medium | Ambalabe Airport | Antsohihy | WAI | FMNW | 354.5 km |
| Medium | Fianarantsoa Airport | | WFI | FMSF | 380.96 km |
| Medium | Analalava Airport | | HVA | FMNL | 384.08 km |
| Medium | Besalampy Airport | | BPY | FMNQ | 385.4 km |
| Medium | Antsirabato Airport | | ANM | FMNH | 433.38 km |
| Medium | Morondava Airport | | MOQ | FMMV | 442.94 km |

== Climate ==
The climate in Ambararata is referred to as a local steppe climate. During the year there is little rainfall. The climate here is classified as BSh by the Köppen-Geiger system. In Ambararata, the average annual temperature is 25.3 °C. The rainfall here averages 727 mm. The least rainfall occurs in July: 0 mm. Most of the precipitation here falls in January, averaging 252 mm. The variation in the precipitation between the driest and wettest months is 252 mm. Throughout the year, temperatures vary by 6.9 °C.
