= Komajia =

- Location in Madagascar
- Coordinates: 16°12′S 47°47′E
- Country: Madagascar
- Region: Sofia
- District: Mampikony
- Elevation: 230 m (750 ft)

Population (2001)
  - Total: 4,000
- Time zone: UTC3 (EAT)

Komajia is a town and commune (Malagasy: kaominina) in Madagascar. It belongs to the district of Mampikony, which is a part of Sofia Region. The population of the commune was estimated to be approximately 4,000 in 2001 commune census.

Only primary schooling is available. The majority 95% of the population of the commune are farmers, while an additional 4.5% receives their livelihood from raising livestock. The most important crops are rice and raffia palm, while other important agricultural products are sugarcane and maize. Services provide employment for 0.5% of the population.
