= Tsiamalao =

- Location in Madagascar
- Coordinates: 15°3′S 48°27′E
- Country: Madagascar
- Region: Sofia
- District: Befandriana-Nord
- Elevation: 264 m (866 ft)

Population (2001)
  - Total: 21,000
- Time zone: UTC3 (EAT)

Tsiamalao is a town and commune (Malagasy: kaominina) in Madagascar. It belongs to the district of Befandriana-Nord, which is a part of Sofia Region. The population of the commune was estimated to be approximately 21,000 in the 2001 commune census.

Primary and junior level secondary education are available in town. The majority 95% of the population of the commune are farmers. The most important crop is rice, while other important products are maize and cassava. Services provide employment for 5% of the population.
