= Ambaripaika =

- Location in Madagascar
- Coordinates: 15°55′S 48°58′E
- Country: Madagascar
- Region: Sofia
- District: Mandritsara
- Elevation: 365 m (1,198 ft)

Population (2001)
  - Total: 7,000
- Time zone: UTC3 (EAT)

Ambaripaika is a town and commune (Malagasy: kaominina) in Madagascar. It belongs to the district of Mandritsara, which is a part of Sofia Region. The population of the commune was estimated to be approximately 7,000 in 2001 commune census.

Only primary schooling is available. The majority 50% of the population of the commune are farmers, while an additional 48% receives their livelihood from raising livestock. The most important crop is rice, while other important products are peanuts and cassava. Services provide employment for 2% of the population.
