= Ambalakirajy =

- Location in Madagascar
- Coordinates: 15°50′S 48°30′E
- Country: Madagascar
- Region: Sofia
- District: Mandritsara
- Elevation: 447 m (1,467 ft)

Population (2001)
  - Total: 20,000
- Time zone: UTC3 (EAT)

Ambalakirajy is a town and commune (Malagasy: kaominina) in Madagascar. It belongs to the district of Mandritsara, which is a part of Sofia Region. The population of the commune was estimated to be approximately 20,000 in 2001 commune census.

Primary and junior level secondary education are available in town. The majority 98% of the population of the commune are farmers, while an additional 2% receives their livelihood from raising livestock. The most important crop is rice, while other important products are maize and cassava.
