= Anjalazala =

- Location in Madagascar
- Coordinates: 15°1′S 48°11′E
- Country: Madagascar
- Region: Sofia
- District: Antsohihy
- Elevation: 165 m (541 ft)

Population (2001)
  - Total: 4,000
  - Ethnicities: Sakalava
- Time zone: UTC3 (EAT)
- Postal code: 407

Anjalazala is a town and commune (Malagasy: kaominina) in Madagascar. It is part of the district of Antsohihy, within the Sofia Region. According to the 2001 commune census, the population of Anjalazala was estimated to be approximately 4,000.

OThe commune offers only primary education. Agriculture is the dominant occupation, with 99% of the population engaged in farming. The most important crop is rice, followed by bananas, maize, and cassava. The service sector provides employment for the remaining 1% of the population.
