= Ambilombe =

- Location in Madagascar
- Coordinates: 15°32′S 49°2′E
- Country: Madagascar
- Region: Sofia
- District: Mandritsara
- Elevation: 459 m (1,506 ft)

Population (2001)
  - Total: 6,000
- Time zone: UTC3 (EAT)

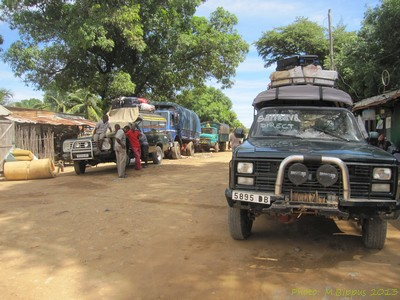
Ambilobe taxi station

Ambilombe is a town and commune (Malagasy: kaominina) in Madagascar. It belongs to the district of Mandritsara, which is a part of Sofia Region. The population of the commune was estimated to be approximately 6,000 in 2001 commune census.

Only primary schooling is available. The majority 95% of the population of the commune are farmers, while an additional 2% receives their livelihood from raising livestock. The most important crops are rice and wheat, while other important agricultural products are coffee, cassava and barley. Services provide employment for 3% of the population.
