= Matsondana =

- Location in Madagascar
- Coordinates: 14°58′S 49°15′E
- Country: Madagascar
- Region: Sofia
- District: Befandriana-Nord
- Elevation: 907 m (2,976 ft)

Population (2001)
  - Total: 40,000
- Time zone: UTC3 (EAT)

Matsondana is a town and commune (Malagasy: kaominina) in Madagascar. It belongs to the district of Befandriana-Nord, which is a part of Sofia Region. The population of the commune was estimated to be approximately 40,000 in 2001 commune census.

Matsondana is served by a local airport. Primary and junior level secondary education are available in town. The majority 54% of the population of the commune are farmers, while an additional 43% receives their livelihood from raising livestock. The most important crops are rice and vanilla; also beans are an important agricultural product. Services provide employment for 3% of the population.
