= Antanambaon'amberina =

- Location in Madagascar
- Coordinates: 16°25′S 49°7′E
- Country: Madagascar
- Region: Sofia
- District: Mandritsara
- Elevation: 575 m (1,886 ft)

Population (2001)
  - Total: 6,000
- Time zone: UTC3 (EAT)

Antanambaon'amberina is a town and commune (Malagasy: kaominina) in Madagascar. It belongs to the district of Mandritsara, which is a part of Sofia Region. The population of the commune was estimated to be approximately 6,000 in 2001 commune census.

Only primary schooling is available. The majority 50% of the population of the commune are farmers, while an additional 47% receives their livelihood from raising livestock. The most important crops are coffee and cloves, while other important agricultural products are beans and rice. Services provide employment for 3% of the population.
