= Ambalaromba =

- Location in Madagascar
- Coordinates: 14°40′S 49°20′E
- Country: Madagascar
- Region: Sofia
- District: Bealanana
- Elevation: 1,109 m (3,638 ft)

Population (2001)
  - Total: 9,000
- Time zone: UTC3 (EAT)

Ambalaromba is a town and commune (Malagasy: kaominina) in Madagascar. It belongs to the district of Bealanana, which is a part of Sofia Region. The population of the commune was estimated to be approximately 9,000 in 2001 commune census.

Only primary schooling is available. The majority 97% of the population of the commune are farmers. The most important crop is rice, while other important products are peanuts, beans and tobacco. Services provide employment for 3% of the population.
