= Analalava =

- Location in Madagascar
- Coordinates: 14°38′S 47°45′E
- Country: Madagascar
- Region: Sofia
- District: Analalava
- Elevation: 41 m (135 ft)

Population (2001)
  - Total: 10,000
- Time zone: UTC3 (EAT)

Analalava is a coastal town and commune (Malagasy: kaominina) in north-western Madagascar over the Mozambique Channel. It is approximately 150 kilometres north of Mahajanga and some 430 kilometres north of the capital Antananarivo. It belongs to the district of Analalava, which is a part of Sofia Region. The population of the commune was estimated to be approximately 10,000 in 2001 commune census.

Analalava is served by a local Analalava Airport. In addition to primary schooling the town offers secondary education at both junior and senior levels. The town has a permanent court and hospital.

The majority 60% of the population works in fishing. 25% are farmers, while an additional 10% receives their livelihood from raising livestock. The most important crop is rice, while other important products are coconuts and cassava. Services provide employment for 5% of the population.

== National Parks ==
The Sahamalaza National Park is partly in this municipality.

== Climate ==
Climate data for Analalava
Month	Jan	Feb	Mar	Apr	May	Jun	Jul	Aug	Sep	Oct	Nov	Dec	Year
Mean daily maximum °C (°F)	30.7 (87.3)	30.5 (86.9)	31.7 (89.1)	32.3 (90.1)	32.1 (89.8)	31.0 (87.8)	30.9 (87.6)	31.3 (88.3)	31.8 (89.2)	32.1 (89.8)	31.5 (88.7)	31.1 (88.0)	31.4 (88.5)
Daily mean °C (°F)	26.4 (79.5)	26.5 (79.7)	27.0 (80.6)	27.2 (81.0)	26.4 (79.5)	25.1 (77.2)	24.6 (76.3)	24.7 (76.5)	25.3 (77.5)	26.4 (79.5)	26.9 (80.4)	26.8 (80.2)	26.1 (79.0)
Mean daily minimum °C (°F)	23.2 (73.8)	23.4 (74.1)	23.5 (74.3)	23.3 (73.9)	22.2 (72.0)	20.6 (69.1)	20.0 (68.0)	19.9 (67.8)	20.6 (69.1)	22.2 (72.0)	23.0 (73.4)	23.4 (74.1)	22.1 (71.8)
Average rainfall mm (inches)	428.6 (16.87)	396.6 (15.61)	199.1 (7.84)	83.3 (3.28)	21.4 (0.84)	6.0 (0.24)	6.0 (0.24)	5.8 (0.23)	12.8 (0.50)	49.1 (1.93)	132.1 (5.20)	299.5 (11.79)	1,640.3 (64.58)
Average precipitation days (≥ 1.0 mm)	19	17	13	7	2	1	2	1	1	4	9	16	92
Mean monthly sunshine hours	208.5	188.2	243.4	271.9	301.9	287.0	297.8	312.8	311.1	317.9	275.2	235.2	3,250.9
Source: NOAA
