= Ampandriakalindy =

- Location in Madagascar
- Coordinates: 14°58′S 48°3′E
- Country: Madagascar
- Region: Sofia
- District: Antsohihy
- Elevation: 37 m (121 ft)

Population (2001)
  - Total: 8,000
- Time zone: UTC3 (EAT)

Ampandriakalindy is a town and commune (Malagasy: kaominina) in Madagascar. It belongs to the district of Antsohihy, which is a part of Sofia Region. The population of the commune was estimated to be approximately 8,000 in 2001 commune census.

Only primary schooling is available. The majority 75% of the population of the commune are farmers, while an additional 22% receives their livelihood from raising livestock. The most important crop is rice, while other important products are bananas, sugarcane and maize. Services provide employment for 3% of the population.
