= Antsatramidoladola =

- Location in Madagascar
- Coordinates: 15°38′S 48°58′E
- Country: Madagascar
- Region: Sofia
- District: Mandritsara
- Elevation: 412 m (1,352 ft)

Population (2001)
  - Total: 9,000
- Time zone: UTC3 (EAT)

Antsatramidoladola is a town and commune (Malagasy: kaominina) in Madagascar. It belongs to the district of Mandritsara, which is a part of Sofia Region. The population of the commune was estimated to be approximately 9,000 in 2001 commune census.

Primary and junior level secondary education are available in town. The majority 75% of the population of the commune are farmers, while an additional 25% receives their livelihood from raising livestock. The most important crop is rice, while other important products are sugarcane and cassava.
