= Anjiabe =

- Location in Madagascar
- Coordinates: 15°39′S 48°20′E
- Country: Madagascar
- Region: Sofia
- District: Mandritsara
- Elevation: 256 m (840 ft)

Population (2001)
  - Total: 7,000
- Time zone: UTC3 (EAT)

Anjiabe is a town and commune (Malagasy: kaominina) in Madagascar. It belongs to the district of Mandritsara, which is a part of Sofia Region. The population of the commune was estimated to be approximately 7,000 in 2001 commune census.

Primary and junior level secondary education are available in town. The majority 99% of the population of the commune are farmers. The most important crop is rice, while other important products are wheat, maize and cassava. Services provide employment for 1% of the population.
