= Ampatakamaroreny =

Ampatakumy
- Location in Madagascar
- Coordinates: 16°29′S 48°48′E
- Country: Madagascar
- Region: Sofia
- District: Mandritsara
- Elevation: 876 m (2,874 ft)

Population (2001)
  - Total: 3,000
- Time zone: UTC3 (EAT)

Ampatakamaroreny is a town and commune (Malagasy: kaominina) in Madagascar. It belongs to the district of Mandritsara, which is a part of Sofia Region. The population of the commune was estimated to be approximately 3,000 in 2001 commune census.

Only primary schooling is available. The majority 50% of the population of the commune are farmers, while an additional 48% receives their livelihood from raising livestock. The most important crops are rice and beans; also bananas are an important agricultural product. Services provide employment for 2% of the population.
