= Marotandrano =

- Location in Madagascar
- Coordinates: 16°10′S 48°50′E
- Country: Madagascar
- Region: Sofia
- District: Mandritsara
- Elevation: 464 m (1,522 ft)

Population (2001)
  - Total: 11,000
- Time zone: UTC3 (EAT)

Marotandrano is a town and commune (Malagasy: kaominina) in Madagascar. It belongs to the district of Mandritsara, which is a part of Sofia Region. The population of the commune was estimated to be approximately 11,000 in 2001 commune census.

Primary and junior level secondary education are available in town. The majority 90% of the population of the commune are farmers. The most important crop is rice, while other important products are banana, wheat, coffee and barley. Services provide employment for 10% of the population.

== Transport ==
- Route nationale 32

== Nature ==
- Marotandrano Reserve is at 10 km from Marotandrano.
