= Antananadava =

- Location in Madagascar
- Coordinates: 15°51′S 48°49′E
- Country: Madagascar
- Region: Sofia
- District: Mandritsara
- Elevation: 318 m (1,043 ft)

Population (2001)
  - Total: 11,000
- Time zone: UTC3 (EAT)

Antananadava or Antanandava is a town and commune (Malagasy: kaominina) in Madagascar. It belongs to the district of Mandritsara, which is a part of Sofia Region. The population of the commune was estimated to be approximately 11,000 in 2001 commune census.

Only primary schooling is available. The majority 95.75% of the population of the commune are farmers, while an additional 4% receives their livelihood from raising livestock. The most important crop is rice, while other important products are peanuts, maize and cassava. Additionally, fishing employs 0.25% of the population.
