= Ambohisoa =

- Location in Madagascar
- Coordinates: 15°59′S 48°22′E
- Country: Madagascar
- Region: Sofia
- District: Mandritsara
- Elevation: 315 m (1,033 ft)

Population (2001)
  - Total: 5,000
- Time zone: UTC3 (EAT)

Ambohisoa is a town and commune (Malagasy: kaominina) in Madagascar. It belongs to the district of Mandritsara, which is a part of the Sofia Region. The population of the commune was estimated to be approximately 5,000 in the 2001 commune census.

Primary and junior level secondary education are available in town. The majority (98%) of the population of the commune are farmers, while an additional 2% receive their livelihood from raising livestock. The most important crop is rice, and other important products are peanuts, sugarcane and cassava.
