= Ambodimanary =

- Location in Madagascar
- Coordinates: 15°13′S 48°5′E
- Country: Madagascar
- Region: Sofia
- District: Antsohihy
- Elevation: 133 m (436 ft)

Population (2001)
  - Total: 11,000
- Time zone: UTC3 (EAT)
- Climate: Aw

Ambodimanary is a town and commune (Malagasy: kaominina) in Madagascar. It belongs to the district of Antsohihy, which is a part of Sofia Region. The population of the commune was estimated to be approximately 11,000 in 2001 commune census.

Primary and junior level secondary education are available in town. The majority 60% of the population of the commune are farmers, while an additional 30% receives their livelihood from raising livestock. The most important crop is rice, while other important products are sugarcane, maize and cassava. Services provide employment for 3% of the population. Additionally fishing employs 7% of the population.
