= Jeanne Razafiangy Dina Fotomanantena =

Malagasy politician

Jeanne Razafiangy Dina Fotomanantena (born April 25, 1951, in Befandriana) is a Malagasy politician. She is a member of the Senate of Madagascar for Atsimo Andrefana, and is a member of the Tiako I Madagasikara party.
