= Route nationale 31 (Madagascar) =

Highway in Madagascar

Location
- Country: Madagascar

Highway system
- Roads in Madagascar

Route nationale 31 (RN 31) is a primary highway in Madagascar of 129 km, running from Bealanana to the junction with the RN 6 near Andrafia.

It is entirely in the Sofia Region.

== Selected locations on route (from northeast to southwest) ==
- Bealanana
- Ambatosia
- Antsohihy near Andrafia - (intersection with RN 6 to Antsiranana or Mahajanga)

== See also ==
- List of roads in Madagascar
- Transport in Madagascar
