= Doany =

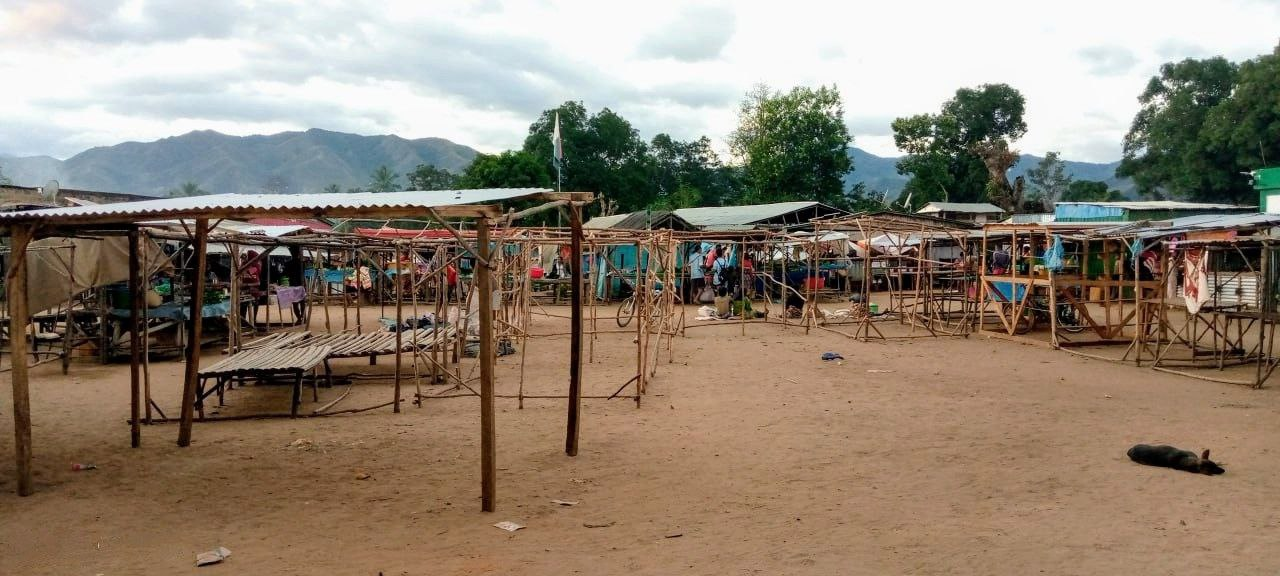
- the market of Doany

- Location in Madagascar
- Coordinates: 14°22′S 49°31′E
- Country: Madagascar
- Region: Sava
- District: Andapa
- Elevation: 402 m (1,319 ft)

Population (2001)
  - Total: 19,928
- Time zone: UTC3 (EAT)

Doany is a rural municipality in northern Madagascar. It belongs to the district of Andapa, which is a part of Sava Region. According to 2001 census, the population of Doany is 19,928.

Doany is served by a local airport. Primary and junior level secondary education are available in town. The majority 99% of the population are farmers. The most important crops are coffee and vanilla, while other important agricultural products are peanut and beans. Services provide employment for 1% of the population.
