= Ankiaka Be Nord =

- Location in Madagascar
- Coordinates: 14°40′S 49°36′E
- Country: Madagascar
- Region: Sava
- District: Andapa
- Elevation: 491 m (1,611 ft)

Population (2001)
  - Total: 8,253
- Time zone: UTC3 (EAT)

Ankiaka Be Nord or Ankiakabe is a commune (Malagasy: kaominina) in northern Madagascar. It belongs to the district of Andapa, which is a part of Sava Region. According to 2001 census the population of Ankiaka Be Nord was 8,253.

Only primary schooling is available in town. The majority 98% of the population are farmers. The most important crop is rice, while other important products are coffee, beans and vanilla. Industry and services provide employment for 0.05% and 1.94% of the population, respectively. Additionally fishing employs 0.01% of the population.
