= Befandriana-Avaratra =

Befandriana-Avaratra Befandriana-Nord

- Location in Madagascar
- Coordinates: 15°16′S 48°32′E
- Country: Madagascar
- Region: Sofia
- District: Befandriana-Nord
- Elevation: 278 m (912 ft)

Population (2001)
  - Total: 13,000
- Time zone: UTC3 (EAT)
- Postal code: 409

Befandriana-Avaratra (literally North Befandriana; also Befandriana-Nord) is a city and urban municipality (commune urbaine) in northern Madagascar. It belongs to the district of Befandriana-Nord, which is a part of Sofia Region. The population of the commune was estimated to be approximately 13,000 in 2001 commune census.

In addition to primary schooling the town offers secondary education at both junior and senior levels. The town provides access to hospital services to its citizens. Farming and raising livestock provides employment for 15% and 10% of the working population. The most important crop is rice, while other important products are wheat, maize, cassava and barley. Industry and services provide employment for 5% and 70% of the population, respectively.

== Geography ==
Befandriana-Avaratra is situated on the Somboana river and 9 fokontany (villages) are part of the municipality. On the right side of the banks of the Somboana are the fokontany of: Fiadanana, Ambalanomby, Tsaramandroso, Manongarivo and Antanambola-Cité and on the left side the fokontany of: Ambatolahy, Mahatsinjo, Tsararivotra I and Tsararivotra II.

== Transport ==
- Route nationale 32 from Antsohihy (86 km) and the National Road 6 to Mandritsara.
- Befandriana-Avaratra is served by a local airport.

== See also ==
- Befandriana Atsimo, a village in Atsimo-Andrefana.
