= Antananivo Haut =

- Location in Madagascar
- Coordinates: 14°17′S 48°37′E
- Country: Madagascar
- Region: Sofia
- District: Bealanana
- Elevation: 1,592 m (5,223 ft)

Population (2001)
  - Total: 5,000
- Time zone: UTC3 (EAT)

Antananivo Haut is a town and commune (Malagasy: kaominina) in Madagascar. It belongs to the district of Bealanana, which is a part of Sofia Region. The population of the commune was estimated to be approximately 5,000 in the 2001 commune census.
