= Ambodiadabo, Mandritsara =

Ambodiadabo
- Location in Madagascar
- Coordinates: 16°7′S 48°32′E
- Country: Madagascar
- Region: Sofia
- District: Mandritsara
- Elevation: 429 m (1,407 ft)

Population (2001)
  - Total: 6,000
- Time zone: UTC3 (EAT)

Ambodiadabo is a town and commune (Malagasy: kaominina) in Madagascar. It belongs to the district of Mandritsara, which is a part of Sofia Region. The population of the commune was estimated to be approximately 6,000 in the 2001 commune census.

Only primary schooling is available. The majority 95% of the population of the commune are farmers. The most important crop is rice, while other important products are wheat, maize, cassava and barley. Services provide employment for 5% of the population.
