= Omphalepia sobria =

Scientific classification
- Kingdom: Animalia
- Phylum: Arthropoda
- Class: Insecta
- Order: Lepidoptera
- Family: Pyralidae
- Genus: Omphalepia
- Species: O. sobria

Binomial name
- Omphalepia sobria Hampson, 1906

Species of moth

Omphalepia sobria is a species of snout moth, and the type species in the genus Omphalepia. It was described by George Hampson in 1906. It is found in Kenya.
