= Tsaratanana, Boriziny =

Tsaratanana
- Location in Madagascar
- Coordinates: 15°39′S 47°51′E
- Country: Madagascar
- Region: Sofia
- District: Boriziny
- Elevation: 38 m (125 ft)

Population (2001)
  - Total: 9,000
- Time zone: UTC3 (EAT)

Tsaratanana is a town and commune (Malagasy: kaominina) in Madagascar. It belongs to the district of Boriziny, which is a part of Sofia Region. The population of the commune was estimated to be approximately 9,000 in 2001 commune census.

Only primary schooling is available. Farming and raising livestock provides employment for 40% and 30% of the working population. The most important crop is rice, while other important products are bananas, sugarcane and barley. Services provide employment for 5% of the population. Additionally fishing employs 25% of the population.
