= Sahamalaza National Park =

National park in Madagascar

- IUCN category II (national park)
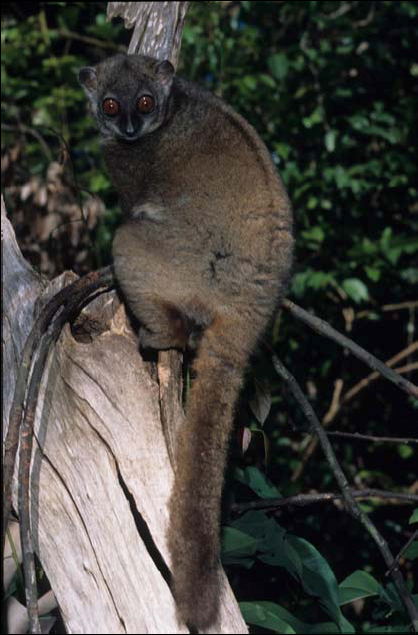
- Sahamalaza sportive lemur (Lepilemur sahamalazensis) in Sahamalaza National Park

- Location within Madagascar
- Nearest city: Ambanja and Analalava.
- Coordinates: 13°57′S 47°39′E
- Area: 260.35 km^{2} (100.52 sq mi)
- Established: 2007

Ramsar Wetland
- Official name: Zones Humides de Sahamalaza
- Designated: 2 February 2017
- Reference no.: 2288

Sahamalaza National Park is in the northwestern part of Madagascar in Sofia region, with 26035 hectares.

Management of the national park has been assigned to Madagascar National Parks, with part of the funding provided by the Madagascar Protected Areas and Biodiversity Fund (FAPBM).

== Geography ==
It is situated near Ambanja in the Ambanja District (Diana Region) and Analalava (Sofia region).

== Species ==
- Blue-eyed black lemur, Northern giant mouse lemur, Sahamalaza sportive lemur, Boophis ankarafensis.

== See also ==
- List of national parks of Madagascar
- Fauna of Madagascar
