= Ambodimanga, Andapa =

Ambodimanga
- Location in Madagascar
- Coordinates: 14°46′S 49°33′E
- Country: Madagascar
- Region: Sava
- District: Andapa
- Elevation: 716 m (2,349 ft)

Population (2001)
  - Total: 6,893
- Time zone: UTC3 (EAT)

Ambodimanga is a commune (Malagasy: kaominina) in northern Madagascar. It belongs to the district of Andapa, which is part of the Sava Region. According to the 2001 census, the population of Ambodimanga was 6,893.

The most important crops are rice and vanilla, while other important agricultural products are coffee and beans. Services provide employment for 1.5% of the population. 98.5% of the population is made up of farmers. Primary and junior level secondary education are available in the town.
