= Anoviara =

- Location in Madagascar
- Coordinates: 14°44′S 49°50′E
- Country: Madagascar
- Region: Sava
- District: Andapa
- Elevation: 217 m (712 ft)

Population (2001)
  - Total: 10,667
- Time zone: UTC3 (EAT)

Anoviara is a commune (Malagasy: kaominina) in northern Madagascar. It belongs to the district of Andapa, which is a part of Sava Region. According to 2001 census the population of Anoviara was 10,667.

Primary and junior level secondary education are available in town. The majority 98% of the population are farmers. The most important crop is vanilla, while other important products are coffee and rice. Services provide employment for 2% of the population.
