= Ambodiangezoka =

- Location in Madagascar
- Coordinates: 14°36′S 49°30′E
- Country: Madagascar
- Region: Sava
- District: Andapa
- Elevation: 503 m (1,650 ft)

Population (2001)
  - Total: 26,673
- Time zone: UTC3 (EAT)

Ambodiangezoka is a commune (Malagasy: kaominina) in northern Madagascar. It belongs to the district of Andapa, which is a part of Sava Region. According to 2001 census the population of Ambodiangezoka was 26,673.

Primary and junior level secondary education are available in town. The majority 95% of the population are farmers. The most important crops are rice and vanilla, while other important agricultural products are coffee and beans. Services provide employment for 5% of the population.
