= Mampikony II =

- Location in Madagascar
- Coordinates: 16°18′S 47°41′E
- Country: Madagascar
- Region: Sofia
- District: Mampikony
- Elevation: 213 m (699 ft)

Population (2001)
  - Total: 14,000
- Time zone: UTC3 (EAT)

Mampikony II is a town and commune (Malagasy: kaominina) in Madagascar. It belongs to the district of Mampikony, which is a part of Sofia Region. The population of the commune was estimated to be approximately 14,000 in 2001 commune census.

Mampikony II is served by a local airport. Only primary schooling is available. The majority 80% of the population of the commune are farmers, while an additional 15% receives their livelihood from raising livestock. The most important crop is rice, while other important products are maize, cassava and onions. Services provide employment for 0.5% of the population. Additionally fishing employs 4.5% of the population.
