= Andapa District =

- District
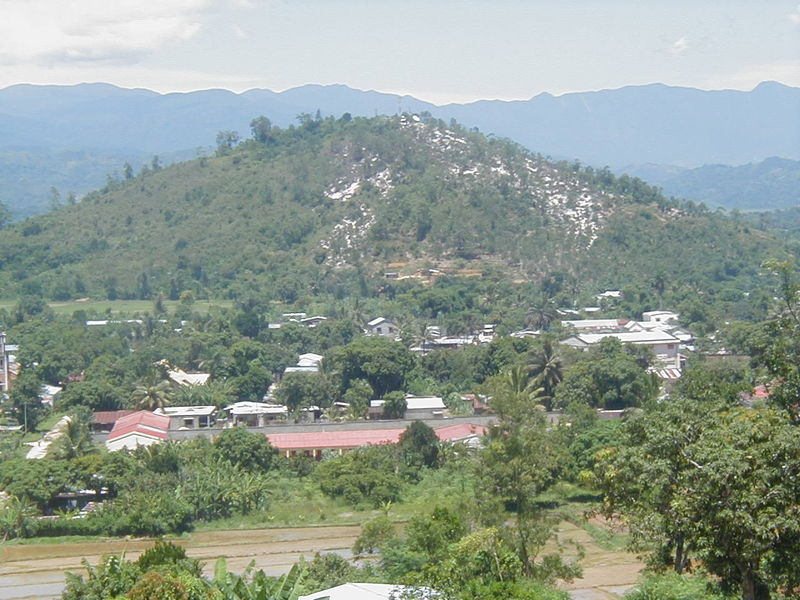
- entrance of Andapa

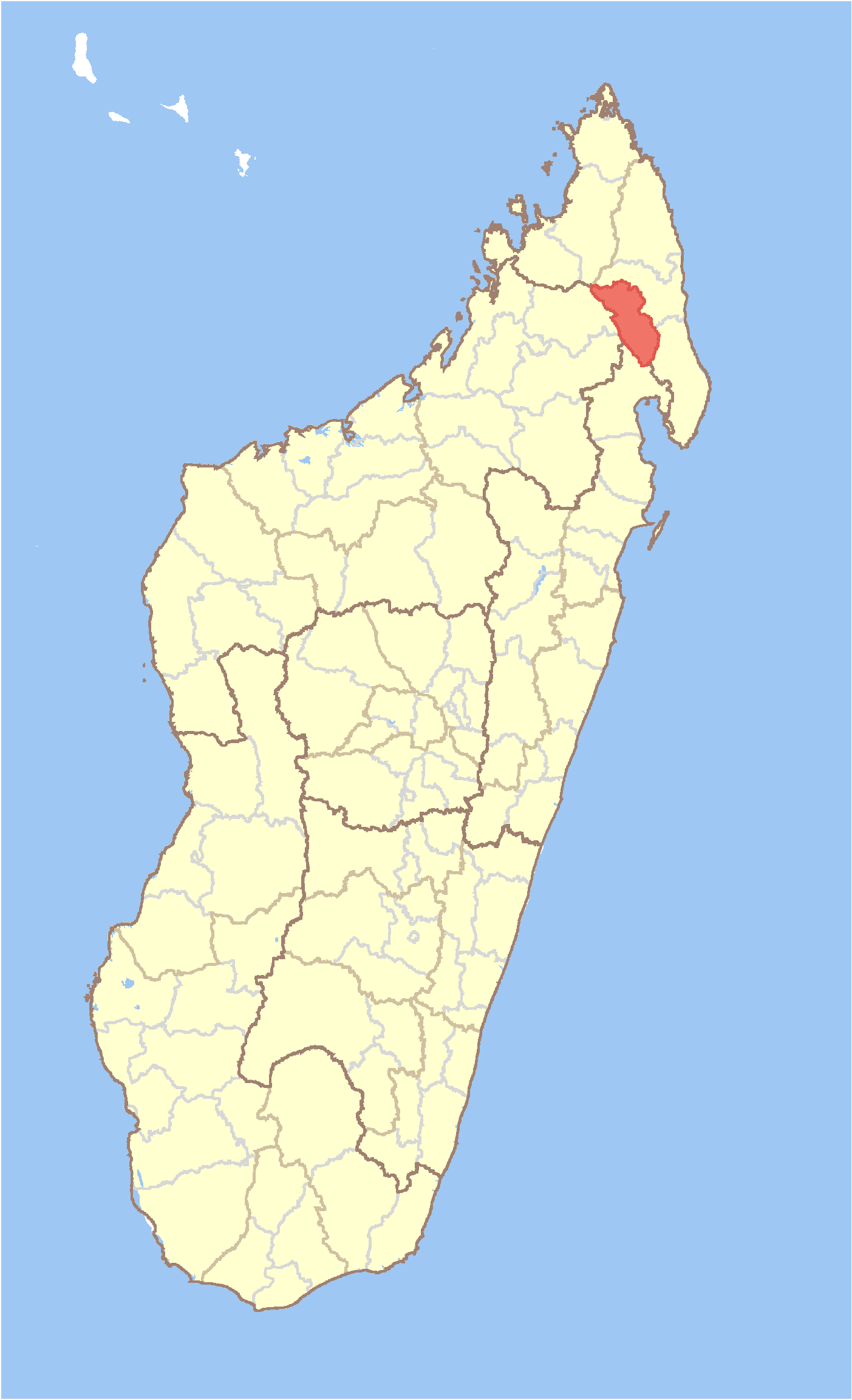
- Location in Madagascar
- Coordinates: 14°39′S 49°39′E
- Country: Madagascar
- Region: Sava

Area
  - Total: 4,051.48 km^{2} (1,564.29 sq mi)

Population (2020)
  - Total: 227,941
  - Density: 56.2612/km^{2} (145.716/sq mi)
- Time zone: UTC3 (EAT)
- Postal code: 205

Andapa District is a district in northern Madagascar. It is a part of Sava Region and borders the districts of Ambilobe and Sambava to the north, Antalaha to the east, Maroantsetra to the south, and Befandriana Nord and Bealanana to the west. The area is 4,051.48 km^{2} (1,564 sq mi) and the population was estimated to be 227,941 in 2020.

== Communes ==
The district is further divided into 17 communes:

- Ambalamanasy II
- Ambodiangezoka
- Ambodimanga, Andapa
- Andapa
- Andrakata
- Andranomena
- Anjialava Be
- Ankiaka Be Nord
- Anoviara
- Antsahamena
- Bealampona
- Belaoka Marovato
- Betsakotsako Andranotsara
- Doany
- Marovato, Andapa
- Matsohely
- Tanandava, Andapa
