= Antsohihy District =

Coordinates: 14°52′34.41″S 47°59′0.42″E

Antsohihy district
- district
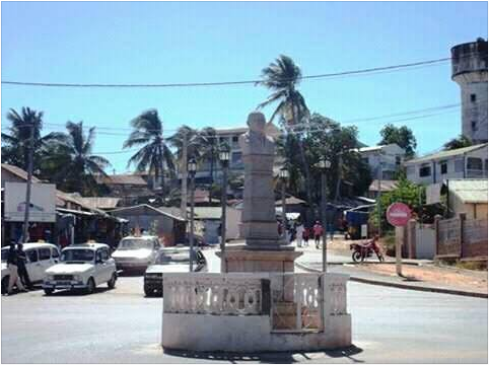

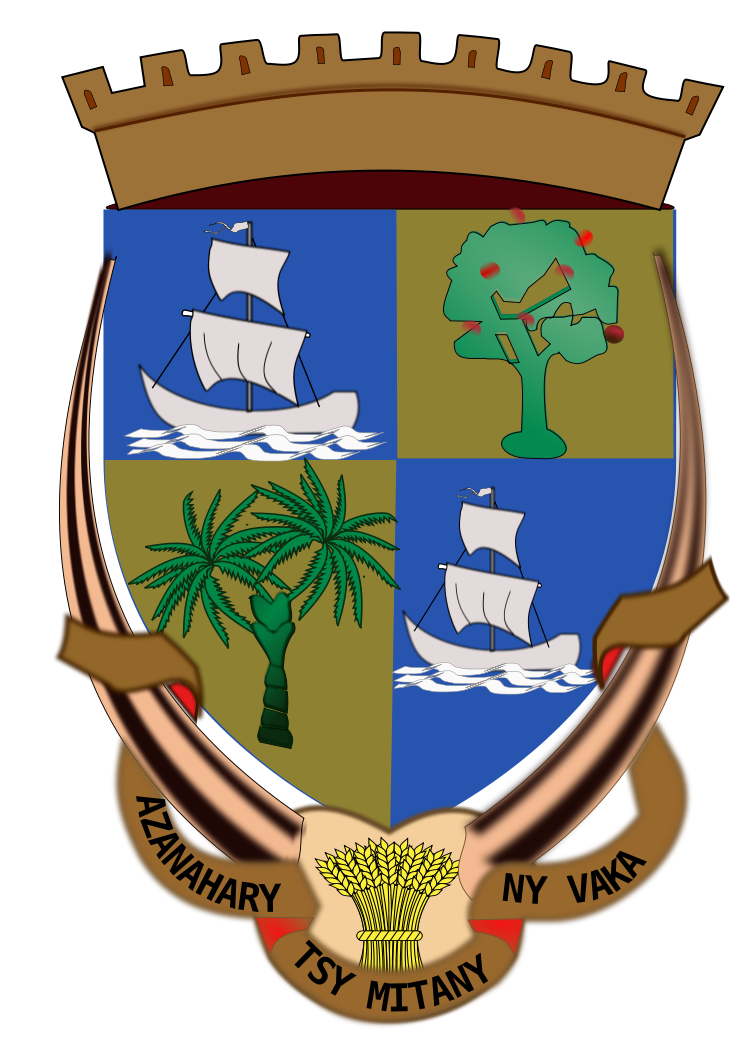
- Flag Seal
- Interactive map of Antsohihy district
- Country: Madagascar
- Region: Sofia
- District: Antsohihy

Area
  - Total: 4,774 km^{2} (1,843 sq mi)

Population (2020 estimate)
  - Total: 186,283
  - Density: 39.02/km^{2} (101.1/sq mi)
- postal code: 407
- Climate: Aw

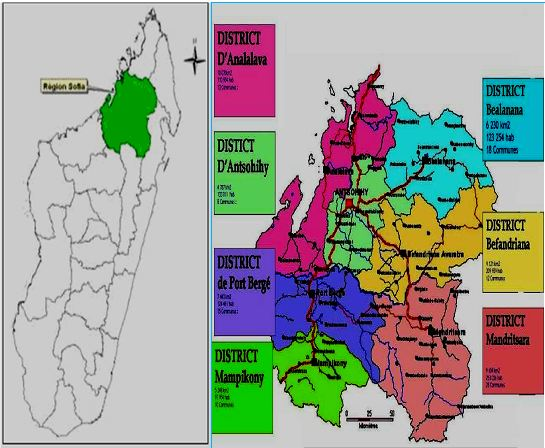
The districts of Sofia

Antsohihy is a district of Sofia in Madagascar. The district has an area of 4,774 km^{2} (1,843 sq mi), and the estimated population in 2020 was 186,283.

== Geography ==
This district is situated at the junction of Route nationale 6 and Route nationale 32. Antsohihy is served by a local airport.

== Rivers ==
The town is crossed by the Loza River.

== Nature ==
- The Bora Reserve is located near Antsohihy.

== Communes ==
The district is further divided into 12 communes:

- Ambimadiro
- Ambodimanary
- Ambodimandresy
- Ampandriakalindy
- Anahidrano
- Andreba
- Anjalazala
- Anjiamangirana I
- Ankerika
- Antsahabe
- Antsohihy
- Maroala
