= Omphalepia =

Scientific classification
- Kingdom: Animalia
- Phylum: Arthropoda
- Class: Insecta
- Order: Lepidoptera
- Family: Pyralidae
- Subfamily: Epipaschiinae
- Genus: Omphalepia; Hampson, 1906

Genus of moths

Omphalepia is a genus of snout moths. It was described by George Hampson in 1906.

== Species ==
- Omphalepia dujardini
- Omphalepia sobria Hampson, 1906
