= Mampikony District =

- District
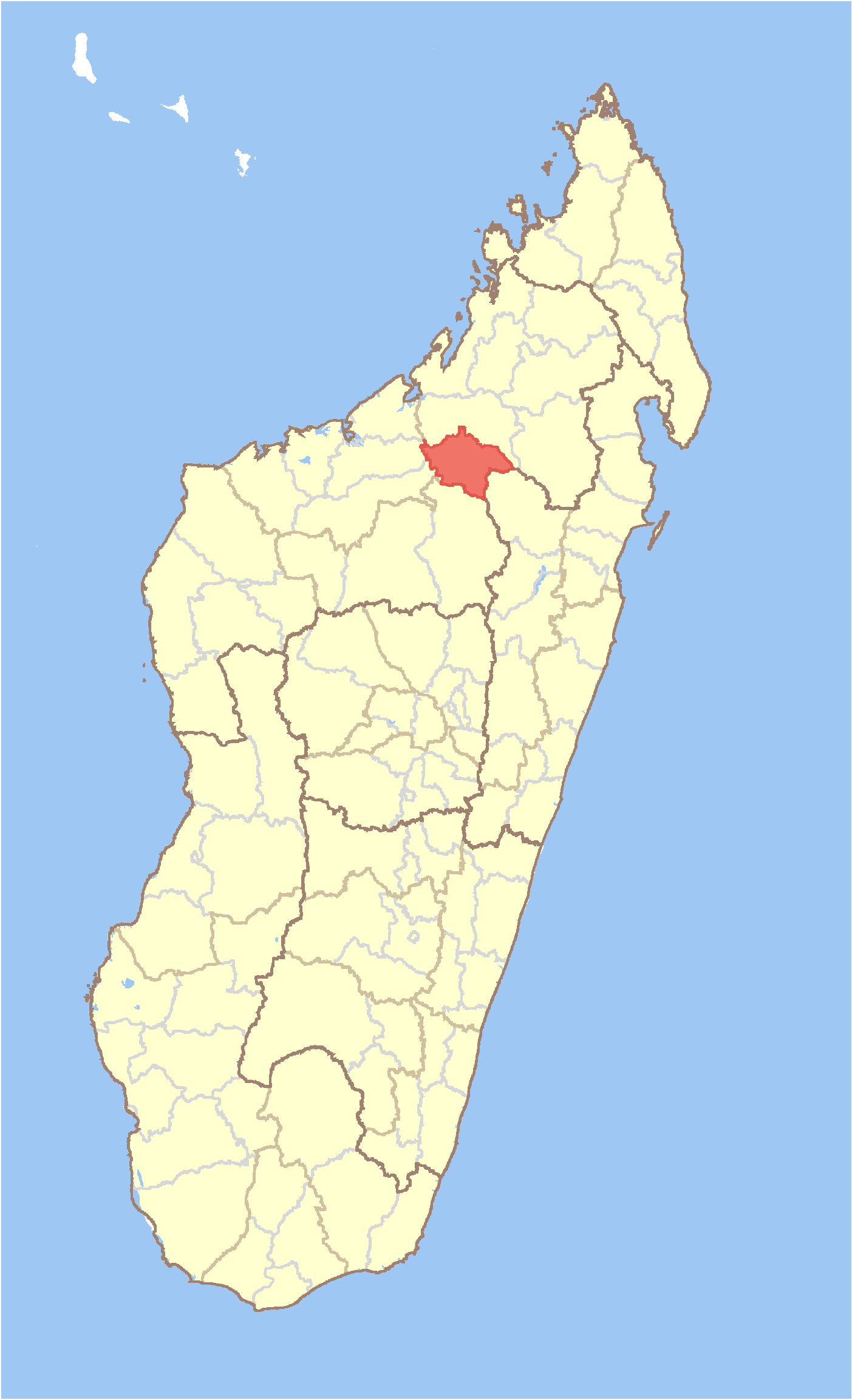
- Location in Madagascar
- Coordinates: 16°11′S 47°42′E
- Country: Madagascar
- Region: Sofia

Area
  - Total: 4,611 km^{2} (1,780 sq mi)

Population (2020)
  - Total: 204,840
  - Density: 18.3/km^{2} (47/sq mi)
- Time zone: UTC3 (EAT)
- Postal code: 414

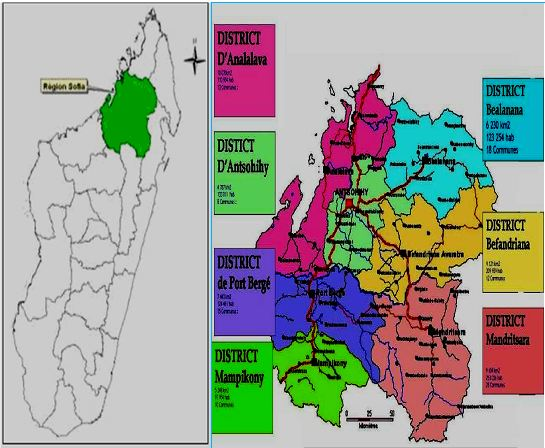
The districts of Sofia

Mampikony is a district in northern Madagascar. It is a part of Sofia Region and borders the districts of Boriziny (Port-Bergé) in north, Marovoay and Ambato Boeny in west, Tsaratanana in south and Andilamena in east. The area is 4,611 km^{2} (1,780 sq mi) and the population was estimated to be 204,840 in 2020.

== Communes ==
The district is further divided into 6 communes:

- Ambohitoaka
- Ampasimatera
- Bekoratsaka
- Komajia
- Mampikony
- Mampikony II

The district is crossed by the RN 6.

== Protected areas ==
- Part of the Bongolava forest corridor, a protected harmonious landscape
- Part of Tampoketsa Analamaitso special reserve
