= Ambodiadabo, Bealanana =

Ambodiadabo
- Location in Madagascar
- Coordinates: 14°45′S 48°59′E
- Country: Madagascar
- Region: Sofia
- District: Bealanana
- Elevation: 1,209 m (3,967 ft)

Population (2001)
  - Total: 14,000
- Time zone: UTC3 (EAT)

Ambodiadabo is a town and commune (Malagasy: kaominina) in Madagascar. It belongs to the district of Bealanana, which is a part of Sofia Region. The population of the commune was estimated to be approximately 14,000 in 2001 commune census.

Only primary schooling is available. The majority 99.7% of the population of the commune are farmers. The most important crop is rice, while other important products are coffee and beans. Services provide employment for 0.3% of the population.
