= Matsohely =

- Location in Madagascar
- Coordinates: 14°37′S 49°34′E
- Country: Madagascar
- Region: Sava
- District: Andapa
- Elevation: 487 m (1,598 ft)

Population (2001)
  - Total: 7,565
- Time zone: UTC3 (EAT)
- Postal code: 205

Matsohely is a commune (Malagasy: kaominina) in northern Madagascar. It belongs to the district of Andapa, which is a part of Sava Region. According to a 2001 census, the population of Matsohely was 7,565.

Only primary schooling is available in town. The majority (99.3%) of the population are farmers. The most important crop is rice, while other important products are peanuts, coffee and beans. Services provide employment for 0.7% of the population.

Postal code 205.
