= Tsaratanana, Mandritsara =

Tsaratanana
- Location in Madagascar
- Coordinates: 15°57′S 48°51′E
- Country: Madagascar
- Region: Sofia
- District: Mandritsara
- Elevation: 335 m (1,099 ft)

Population (2001)
  - Total: 6,000
- Time zone: UTC3 (EAT)

Tsaratanana is a town and commune (Malagasy: kaominina) in Madagascar. It belongs to the district of Mandritsara, which is a part of Sofia Region. The population of the commune was estimated to be approximately 6,000 in the 2001 commune census.

Only primary schooling is available. 50% of the population of the commune are farmers, while an additional 49% receive their livelihood from raising livestock. The most important crop is rice, while other important products are sugarcane and cassava. Services provide employment for 1% of the population.
