= Anjialava Be =

- Location in Madagascar
- Coordinates: 14°13′S 49°27′E
- Country: Madagascar
- Region: Sava
- District: Andapa
- Elevation: 980 m (3,220 ft)

Population (2001)
  - Total: 5,528
- Time zone: UTC3 (EAT)

Anjialava Be or Anjialavabe is a commune (Malagasy: kaominina) in northern Madagascar. It belongs to the district of Andapa, which is a part of Sava Region. According to 2001 census the population of Anjialava Be was 5,528.

Only primary schooling is available in town. The population are farmers, and the most important crops are coffee and vanilla; also rice is an important agricultural product.
