= Ambatosia =

- Location in Madagascar
- Coordinates: 14°40′S 48°39′E
- Country: Madagascar
- Region: Sofia
- District: Bealanana
- Elevation: 1,051 m (3,448 ft)

Population (2001)
  - Total: 19,000
- Time zone: UTC3 (EAT)
- Köppen: Cwa

Ambatosia is a town and commune (Malagasy: kaominina) in Madagascar. It belongs to the district of Bealanana, which is a part of Sofia Region. The population of the commune was estimated to be approximately 19,000 in 2001 commune census.

Primary and junior level secondary education are available in town. The majority 70% of the population of the commune are farmers, while an additional 29.5% receives their livelihood from raising livestock. The most important crop is onions, while other important products are peanuts and beans. Services provide employment for 0.5% of the population.
