= Befandriana-Nord District =

Befandriana-Nord District Befandriana-Avaratra
- District
- Befandriana Avaratra

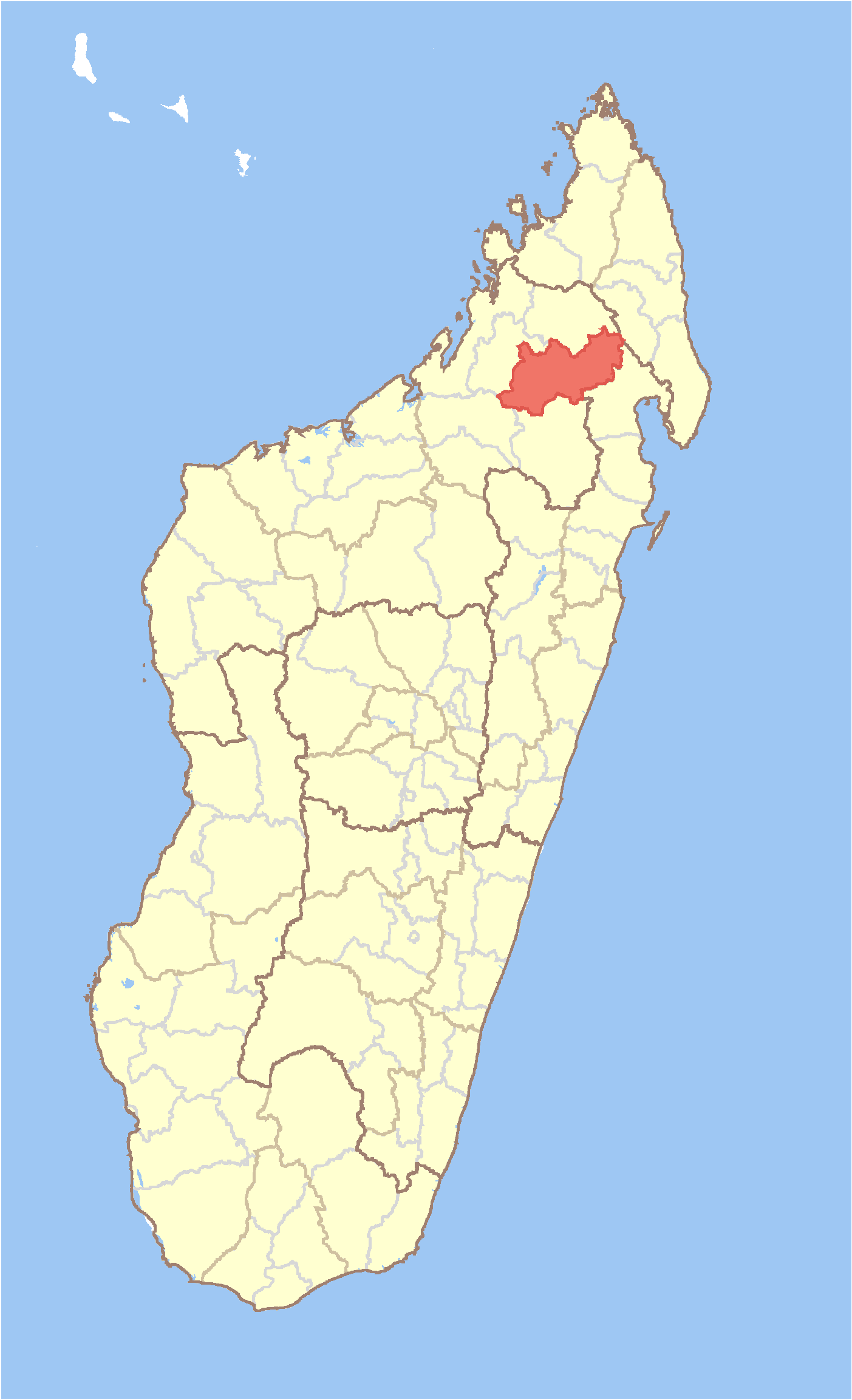
- Location in Madagascar
- Coordinates: 15°9′S 48°48′E
- Country: Madagascar
- Region: Sofia

Area
  - Total: 8,718.98 km^{2} (3,366.42 sq mi)

Population (2020)
  - Total: 271,314
  - Density: 31.1176/km^{2} (80.5943/sq mi)
  - Ethnicities: Tsimihety
- Time zone: UTC3 (EAT)
- Postal code: 409

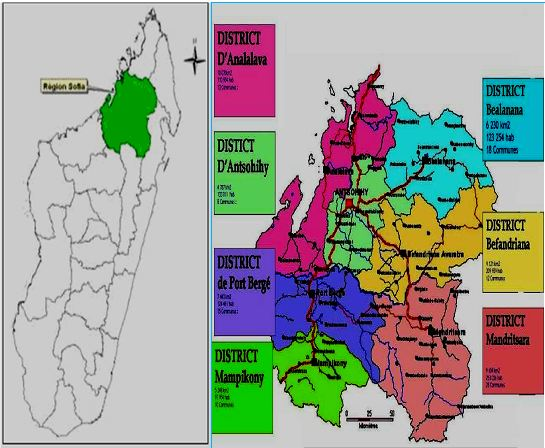
The districts of Sofia

Befandriana-Nord or Befandriana-Avaratra (literally North Befandriana) is a district in northern Madagascar. It is a part of Sofia Region and borders the districts of Bealanana in north, Andapa to the northeast, Maroantsetra to the east, Mandritsara to the south, Boriziny-Vaovao (formerly Port-Bergé) to the southwest and Antsohihy to the north-west. The area is 8,718.98 km^{2} (3,366 sq mi) and the population was estimated to be 271,314 in 2020.

== Communes ==
The district is further divided into 12 communes:

- Ambararata
- Ambodimotso-Atsimo
- Ambolidibe Atsinanana
- Ankarongana
- Antsakabary
- Antsakanalabe
- Befandriana-Avaratra
- Maroamalona
- Matsondana
- Morafeno
- Tsarahonenana
- Tsiamalao

== Transport ==
The district is crossed by the Route nationale 32.

== Nature ==
- Part of Makira Natural Park
