= Betsakotsako Andranotsara =

- Location in Madagascar
- Coordinates: 14°38′S 49°38′E
- Country: Madagascar
- Region: Sava
- District: Andapa
- Elevation: 475 m (1,558 ft)

Population (2001)
  - Total: 6,314
- Time zone: UTC3 (EAT)

Betsakotsako Andranotsara is a commune (Malagasy: kaominina) in northern Madagascar. It belongs to the district of Andapa, which is a part of Sava Region. According to 2001 census the population of Betsakotsako Andranotsara was 6,314.

Only primary schooling is available in town. The majority 98.5% of the population are farmers. The most important crop is rice, while other important products are coffee and vanilla. Services provide employment for 1.5% of the population.
