= Ambalamanasy II =

- Location in Madagascar
- Coordinates: 14°31′S 49°35′E
- Country: Madagascar
- Region: Sava
- District: Andapa
- Elevation: 521 m (1,709 ft)

Population (2001)
  - Total: 24,211
- Time zone: UTC3 (EAT)

Ambalamanasy II is a commune (Malagasy: kaominina) in northern Madagascar. It belongs to the district of Andapa, which is a part of Sava Region. According to 2001 census the population of Ambalamanasy II was 24,211.

Primary and junior level secondary education are available in town. The majority 98% of the population are farmers. The most important crops are rice and vanilla, while other important agricultural products are coffee and sugarcane. Services provide employment for 2% of the population.
