= Marotolana, Bealanana =

Marotolana
- Location in Madagascar
- Coordinates: 14°39′S 48°59′E
- Country: Madagascar
- Region: Sofia
- District: Bealanana
- Elevation: 1,091 m (3,579 ft)

Population (2001)
  - Total: 9,000
- Time zone: UTC3 (EAT)

Marotolana or Marotaolana is a town and commune (Malagasy: kaominina) in Madagascar. It belongs to the district of Bealanana, which is a part of Sofia Region. The population of the commune was estimated to be approximately 9,000 in 2001 commune census.

Primary and junior level secondary education are available in town. The majority 97% of the population of the commune are farmers. The most important crop is rice, while other important products are coffee, beans and cassava. Services provide employment for 3% of the population.
