= Bealampona =

- Location in Madagascar
- Coordinates: 14°41′S 49°31′E
- Country: Madagascar
- Region: Sava
- District: Andapa
- Elevation: 904 m (2,966 ft)

Population (2001)
  - Total: 11,976
- Time zone: UTC3 (EAT)
- Postal code: 205

Health Centre in Bealampona

Bealampona is a commune (Malagasy: kaominina) in northern Madagascar. It belongs to the district of Andapa, which is a part of Sava Region. According to 2001 census the population of Bealampona was 11,976.

Primary and junior level secondary education are available in town. It is also a site of industrial-scale mining. The majority 99% of the population are farmers. The most important crop is rice, while other important products are coffee, sugarcane and vanilla. Services provide employment for 1% of the population.

Postal code 205.
