= Mandritsara Airport =

Airport in Madagascar

- IATA: WMA; ICAO: FMNX

Summary
- Airport type: Public/Military
- Operator: ADEMA (Aéroports de Madagascar)
- Serves: Mandritsara
- Location: Sofia Region, Madagascar
- Elevation AMSL: 1,007 ft / 307 m
- Coordinates: 15°49′58″S 48°49′59″E

Map
- Location within Madagascar

Mandritsara Airport (IATA: WMA, ICAO: FMNX) is an airport in Mandritsara, Sofia Region, Madagascar.

== Scheduled services ==
There are no scheduled flights to the airport. It is served by Mission Avistion Fellowship.
