= Antsahamena =

- Location in Madagascar
- Coordinates: 14°55′S 49°45′E
- Country: Madagascar
- Region: Sava
- District: Andapa
- Elevation: 505 m (1,657 ft)

Population (2001)
  - Total: 3,418
- Time zone: UTC3 (EAT)

Antsahamena is a commune (Malagasy: kaominina) in northern Madagascar. It belongs to the district of Andapa, which is a part of Sava Region. According to 2001 census the population of Antsahamena was 3,418.

Only primary schooling is available in town. The majority 99.5% of the population are farmers. The most important crops are rice and vanilla; also coffee is an important agricultural product. Services provide employment for 0.5% of the population.
