= Tanandava, Andapa =

Tanandava
- Location in Madagascar
- Coordinates: 14°38′S 49°34′E
- Country: Madagascar
- Region: Sava
- District: Andapa
- Elevation: 496 m (1,627 ft)

Population (2001)
  - Total: 6,152
- Time zone: UTC3 (EAT)

Tanandava is a commune (Malagasy: kaominina) in northern Madagascar. It belongs to the district of Andapa, which is a part of Sava Region. According to 2001 census the population of Tanandava was 6,152.

Only primary schooling is available in town. The majority 98% of the population are farmers. The most important crops are rice and vanilla, while other important agricultural products are coffee and beans. Services provide employment for 2% of the population.
