= Andrakata =

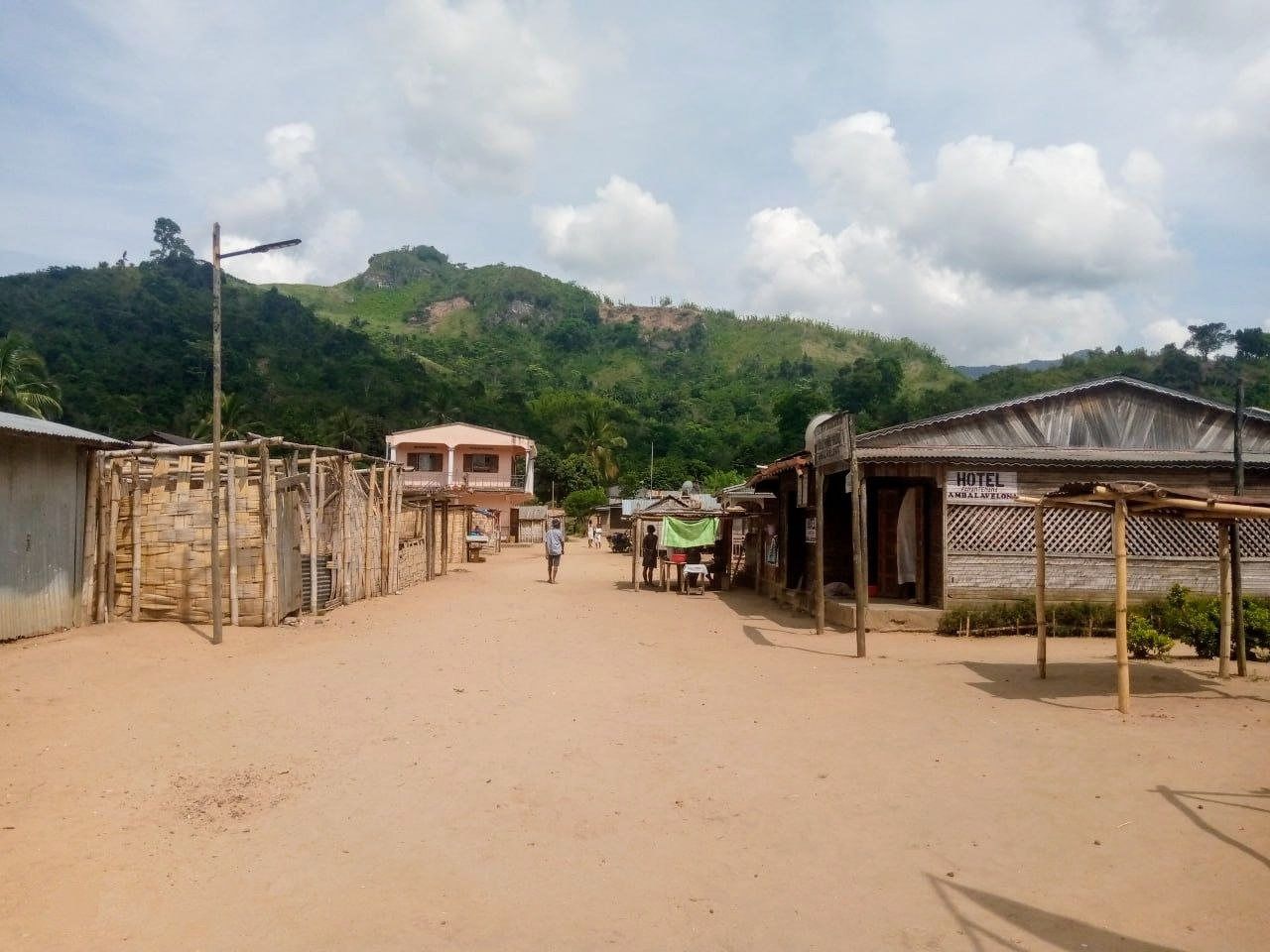
- In Ambalavelona, a fokontany of Andrakata

- Location in Madagascar
- Coordinates: 14°37′S 49°43′E
- Country: Madagascar
- Region: Sava
- District: Andapa
- Elevation: 434 m (1,424 ft)

Population (2001)
  - Total: 15,401
- Time zone: UTC3 (EAT)

Andrakata is a rural municipality in northern Madagascar. It belongs to the district of Andapa, which is a part of Sava Region. According to 2001 census the population of Andrakata was 15,401.

Primary and junior level secondary education are available in town. The majority 98.5% of the population are farmers. The most important crop is vanilla, while other important products are coffee, beans and rice. Services provide employment for 1.5% of the population.
