= Mampikony =

- Location in Madagascar
- Coordinates: 16°5′30″S 47°38′50″E
- Country: Madagascar
- Region: Sofia
- District: Mampikony
- Elevation: 55 m (180 ft)

Population (2018)census
  - Total: 28,593
- Time zone: UTC3 (EAT)
- Postal code: 414

Carte bassin Sofia

Mampikony urban municipality in northern Madagascar. It belongs to the district of Mampikony, which is a part of Sofia Region. The population of the municipality was 28,593 in 2018.

Mampikony is located at the Route nationale 6 and served by the local Mampikony Airport. The town provides access to hospital services to its citizens.

== Geography ==
It is situated at 84 km from Ambondromamy on the Route nationale 6 and the Mampikony River, an affluent of the Bemarivo River.

== Religion ==
- FJKM - Fiangonan'i Jesoa Kristy eto Madagasikara (Church of Jesus Christ in Madagascar)
- FLM - Fiangonana Loterana Malagasy (Malagasy Lutheran Church)
- Roman Catholic church
- Adventist - (Adventist Church of Madagascar)
- Fiangonana APOKALIPSY (Apokalipsic Church)

== Economy ==
Cotton and tobacco plantations. The majority 75% of the population of the commune are farmers, while an additional 10% receives their livelihood from raising livestock. The most important crops are rice and onions; also cassava is an important agricultural product. Services provide employment for 15% of the population.

A thermic central of Jirama is localized in this town.

== Protected areas ==
- The Bongolava Forest Corridor that covers the area between Port Bergé and Mampikony.
