= Ambalabe Airport =

Airport in Madagascar

- IATA: WAI; ICAO: FMNW

Summary
- Airport type: Public
- Operator: ADEMA (Aéroports de Madagascar)
- Serves: Antsohihy
- Location: Sofia Region, Madagascar
- Elevation AMSL: 92 ft / 28 m
- Coordinates: 14°53′49″S 47°59′38″E

Map
- Location within Madagascar

Runways
Direction	Length		Surface
Direction	ft	m	Surface
01/19	4,870	1,480	asphalt

Ambalabe Airport is an airport in Antsohihy, Sofia Region, Madagascar (IATA: WAI, ICAO: FMNW).
