= Analalava Airport =

Airport in Madagascar

- IATA: HVA; ICAO: FMNL

Summary
- Airport type: Public/Military
- Operator: ADEMA (Aéroports de Madagascar)
- Serves: Analalava
- Location: Analalava, Madagascar
- Elevation AMSL: 345 ft / 105 m
- Coordinates: 14°37′47″S 47°45′50″E

Map
- Location within Madagascar

Runways
Direction	Length		Surface
Direction	ft	m	Surface
11/29	3,421	1,043	Long

Analalava Airport is an airport in Analalava, Madagascar (IATA: HVA, ICAO: FMNL). It is at Latitude -14.6296997 Longitude 47.7638016 with Runway 1 length of 3937 feet. The airport has a field elevation of 345 feet and a magnetic variation of 10.286°W it is a regional airport that has scheduled airline service.
