= Andranomena =

- Location in Madagascar
- Coordinates: 14°36′S 49°33′E
- Country: Madagascar
- Region: Sava
- District: Andapa
- Elevation: 483 m (1,585 ft)

Population (2001)
  - Total: 4,038
- Time zone: UTC3 (EAT)

Andranomena is a commune (Malagasy: kaominina) in northern Madagascar. It belongs to the district of Andapa, which is a part of Sava Region. According to 2001 census the population of Andranomena was 4,038.

Only primary schooling is available in town. The majority 94% of the population are farmers. The most important crop is rice, while other important products are beans and vanilla. Industry and services provide employment for 5% and 1% of the population, respectively.
