= Cornell Biological Field Station =

Biological research station in Madison County, New York

Cornell Biological Field Station conducts fisheries and aquatic ecology research with a focus on the Great Lakes, Oneida lake and other inland lakes located in New York State. The field station is located in Madison County, New York.

== History ==
In 1955, Iola Warrior Brown, the wife of Cornell alumnus Charles S. Brown, gifted their Shackelton Point property to Cornell University, fulfilling her late husband’s wishes. The following year, in 1956, Cornell officially established the site as a biological field station. Professor Gustav Swanson, an ornithologist and head of the Department of Conservation at Cornell, recognized the property’s potential for research and proposed developing it into a dedicated facility with a resident director and a vessel for lake sampling. John Forney was the first director of the field station from 1963 until 1992. The current director is Lars Rudstam.

== Research ==
Much research at CBFS focusses on Oneida Lake (the largest lake entirely within New York State). Research on the lake’s ecological health includes studies into fish population dynamics (such as walleye, yellow perch and bowfin). As a result of the lake's popularity with sport fishers, research also takes place on fish parasites as well as water temperature, nutrient levels, and harmful algal blooms.

Research on the Great Lakes takes place with cooperation from New York State Department of Environmental Conservation, United States Geological Survey, United States Fish and Wildlife Service, United States Environmental Protection Agency and the State University of New York at Buffalo. The station is part of the Global Lake Ecological Observatory Network.
