= Oncostemum oliganthum =

Scientific classification
- Kingdom: Plantae
- Clade: Tracheophytes
- Clade: Angiosperms
- Clade: Eudicots
- Clade: Asterids
- Order: Ericales
- Family: Primulaceae
- Genus: Oncostemum
- Species: O. oliganthum

Binomial name
- Oncostemum oliganthum (Baker) Mez

Synonyms
- Ardisia oligantha Baker; Oncostemon dissitiflorum (Baker) Mez; Ardisia dissitiflora Baker

Species of plant

Oncostemum oliganthum is a species of flowering plant in the Primulaceae family. It is found in Madagascar.
