= Mandritsara District =

- District
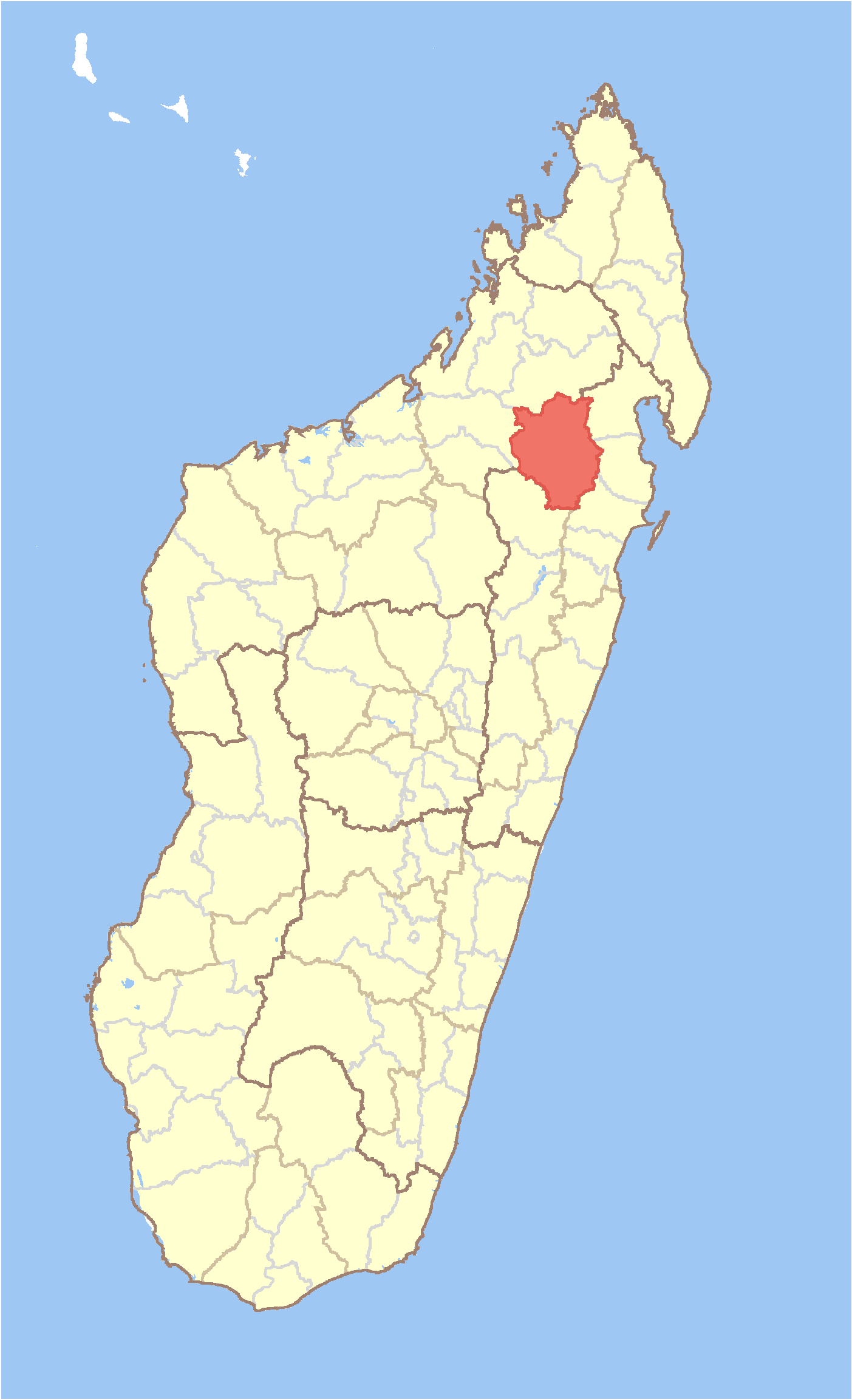
- Location in Madagascar
- Coordinates: 16°18′S 48°59′E
- Country: Madagascar
- Region: Sofia

Area
  - Total: 10,512 km^{2} (4,059 sq mi)

Population (2020)
  - Total: 320,647
  - Density: 30.503/km^{2} (79.002/sq mi)
  - Ethnicities: Tsimihety
- Time zone: UTC3 (EAT)
- Postal code: 415

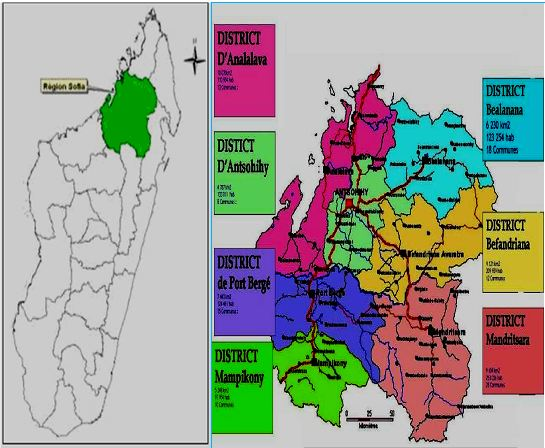
The districts of Sofia

Mandritsara is a district in northern Madagascar. It is a part of Sofia Region and borders the districts of Befandriana-Avaratra in north, Maroantsetra in northeast, Mananara in east, Soanierana Ivongo in southeast, Andilamena in south and Boriziny (Port-Bergé) in west. The area is 10,512 km^{2} (4,059 sq mi) and the population was estimated to be 320,647 in 2020.

== Communes ==
The district is further divided into 22 communes:

- Ambalakirajy
- Ambarikorano
- Ambaripaika
- Ambilombe
- Amboaboa
- Ambodiadabo
- Ambohisoa
- Amborondolo
- Ampatakamaroreny
- Andohajango
- Anjiabe
- Ankiabe Salohy
- Antanambaon'amberina
- Antananadava
- Antsatramidoladola
- Antsirabe Afovoany
- Antsoha
- Kalandy
- Manampaneva
- Mandritsara
- Marotandrano
- Tsaratanana

== Nature ==
- Marotandrano Reserve is at 42 km from Mandritsara.
- Part of Makira Natural Park
