= Bealanana =

- Location in Madagascar
- Coordinates: 14°33′S 48°44′E
- Country: Madagascar
- Region: Sofia
- District: Bealanana
- Elevation: 1,073 m (3,520 ft)

Population (2001)
  - Total: 14,000
  - Ethnicities: Tsimihety
- Time zone: UTC3 (EAT)
- Postal code: 408

Bealanana is a town and commune (Malagasy: kaominina) in western Madagascar. It belongs to the district of Bealanana, which is a part of Sofia Region. The population of the commune was estimated to be approximately 14,000 in 2001 commune census.

Bealanana is served by a local airport. In addition to primary schooling the town offers secondary education at both junior and senior levels. The town provides access to hospital services to its citizens.

The majority 92% of the population of the commune are farmers, while an additional 1% receives their livelihood from raising livestock. The most important crop is rice, while other important products are sugarcane, maize and onions. Services provide employment for 6% of the population. Additionally fishing employs 1% of the population.

The Tsaratanana Reserve is located 57 km north of this town.

== Roads ==
Bealanana is connected with the rest of the country by the RN 31 that leads from Bealanana to the junction with the RN 6 near Andrafia.

== Sports ==
- AFC Motul Bealanana (football champion of Sofia 2012)
