= Oncostemum =

Scientific classification
- Kingdom: Plantae
- Clade: Embryophytes
- Clade: Tracheophytes
- Clade: Angiosperms
- Clade: Eudicots
- Clade: Asterids
- Order: Ericales
- Family: Primulaceae
- Subfamily: Myrsinoideae
- Genus: Oncostemum; A.Juss.

Species
- See text

Synonyms
- Oncostemon Spach

Genus of flowering plants

Oncostemum are a genus of flowering plants in the family Primulaceae, native to the Comoros and Madagascar. The Mascarene Islands endemic genus Badula appears to nest inside Oncostemum.

== Species ==
Currently accepted species include:

- Oncostemum acuminatum Mez
- Oncostemum andreanae H.Perrier
- Oncostemum ankifiense Mez
- Oncostemum arboreum H.Perrier
- Oncostemum arthriticum Baker
- Oncostemum balanocarpum Mez
- Oncostemum barbeyanum Mez
- Oncostemum boivinianum H.Perrier
- Oncostemum bojerianum A.DC.
- Oncostemum botryoides Baker
- Oncostemum brevipedatum Mez
- Oncostemum buxifolium H.Perrier
- Oncostemum capelieranum A.Juss.
- Oncostemum capitatum H.Perrier
- Oncostemum cauliflorum H.Perrier
- Oncostemum celastroides H.Perrier
- Oncostemum commersonianum A.Juss.
- Oncostemum coriaceum H.Perrier
- Oncostemum coursii H.Perrier
- Oncostemum crenatum Mez
- Oncostemum dauphinense H.Perrier
- Oncostemum denticulatum H.Perrier
- Oncostemum divaricatum A.DC.
- Oncostemum dracaenifolium H.Perrier
- Oncostemum elephantipes H.Perrier
- Oncostemum ericophilum H.Perrier
- Oncostemum evonymoides Mez
- Oncostemum falcifolium Mez
- Oncostemum filicinum Mez
- Oncostemum flexuosum Baker
- Oncostemum formosum H.Perrier
- Oncostemum forsythii Mez
- Oncostemum fuscopilosum (Baker) Mez
- Oncostemum glaucum H.Perrier
- Oncostemum goudotianum A.DC.
- Oncostemum gracile Mez
- Oncostemum gracilipes H.Perrier
- Oncostemum hieroglyforme H.Perrier
- Oncostemum hildebrandtii Mez
- Oncostemum hirsutum H.Perrier
- Oncostemum humbertianum H.Perrier
- Oncostemum humblotii Mez
- Oncostemum imparipinnatum H.Perrier
- Oncostemum laevigatum Mez
- Oncostemum laurifolium (Bojer ex A.DC.) Mez
- Oncostemum laxiflorum Mez
- Oncostemum leprosum Mez
- Oncostemum leptocladum (Baker) Mez
- Oncostemum lichenophilum H.Perrier
- Oncostemum linearisepalum H.Perrier
- Oncostemum longipes (Baker) Mez
- Oncostemum lucens H.Perrier
- Oncostemum macranthum H.Perrier
- Oncostemum macrocarpum H.Perrier
- Oncostemum macrophyllum Mez
- Oncostemum macroscyphon (Baker) Mez
- Oncostemum macrostachyum Mez
- Oncostemum matitanense H.Perrier
- Oncostemum meeusianum H.Perrier
- Oncostemum mezianum H.Perrier
- Oncostemum microphyllum (Roem. & Schult.) Mez
- Oncostemum microsphaerum Baker
- Oncostemum musicola H.Perrier
- Oncostemum myrtilloides H.Perrier
- Oncostemum nemorosum A.DC.
- Oncostemum neriifolium Baker
- Oncostemum nervosum Baker
- Oncostemum nitidulum (Baker) Mez
- Oncostemum oliganthum (Baker) Mez
- Oncostemum ovatoacuminatum H.Perrier
- Oncostemum pachybotrys Mez
- Oncostemum palmiforme H.Perrier
- Oncostemum paniculatum H.Perrier
- Oncostemum pauciflorum A.DC.
- Oncostemum pendulum Mez
- Oncostemum pentagonum H.Perrier
- Oncostemum phyllarthoides Baker
- Oncostemum platycladum Baker
- Oncostemum polytrichum Baker
- Oncostemum pterocaule Mez
- Oncostemum pustulosum H.Perrier
- Oncostemum racemiferum Mez
- Oncostemum radlkoferi Mez
- Oncostemum reflexum Mez
- Oncostemum richardianum H.Perrier
- Oncostemum ricnanense H.Perrier
- Oncostemum roseum Aug.DC.
- Oncostemum rubricaule H.Perrier
- Oncostemum rubronotatum H.Perrier
- Oncostemum scabridum Mez
- Oncostemum scriptum H.Perrier
- Oncostemum seyrigii H.Perrier
- Oncostemum subcuspidatum H.Perrier
- Oncostemum tenerum Mez
- Oncostemum terniflorum H.Perrier
- Oncostemum triflorum H.Perrier
- Oncostemum umbellatum Mez
- Oncostemum vacciniifolium Baker
- Oncostemum venulosum Baker
- Oncostemum viride H.Perrier
