= Ifasina III =

- Location in Madagascar
- Coordinates: 19°20′14″S 48°37′00″E
- Country: Madagascar
- Region: Atsinanana
- District: Vatomandry (district)

Population (2019)census
  - Total: 2,910
  - Ethnicities: Betsimisaraka
- Time zone: UTC3 (EAT)
- postal code: 517

Ifasina III is a rural municipality located in the Atsinanana region of eastern Madagascar, and belongs to the Vatomandry (district).

This town is situated on the eastern coast of Madagascar, in the southern part of Atsinanana. It a new municipality that had been created only in 2015. Its seat is in Marovato, Antsinanana.
