= Albany Wildlife Area =

State wildlife area in Wisconsin

- Albany State Wildlife Area
- IUCN category V (protected landscape/seascape)
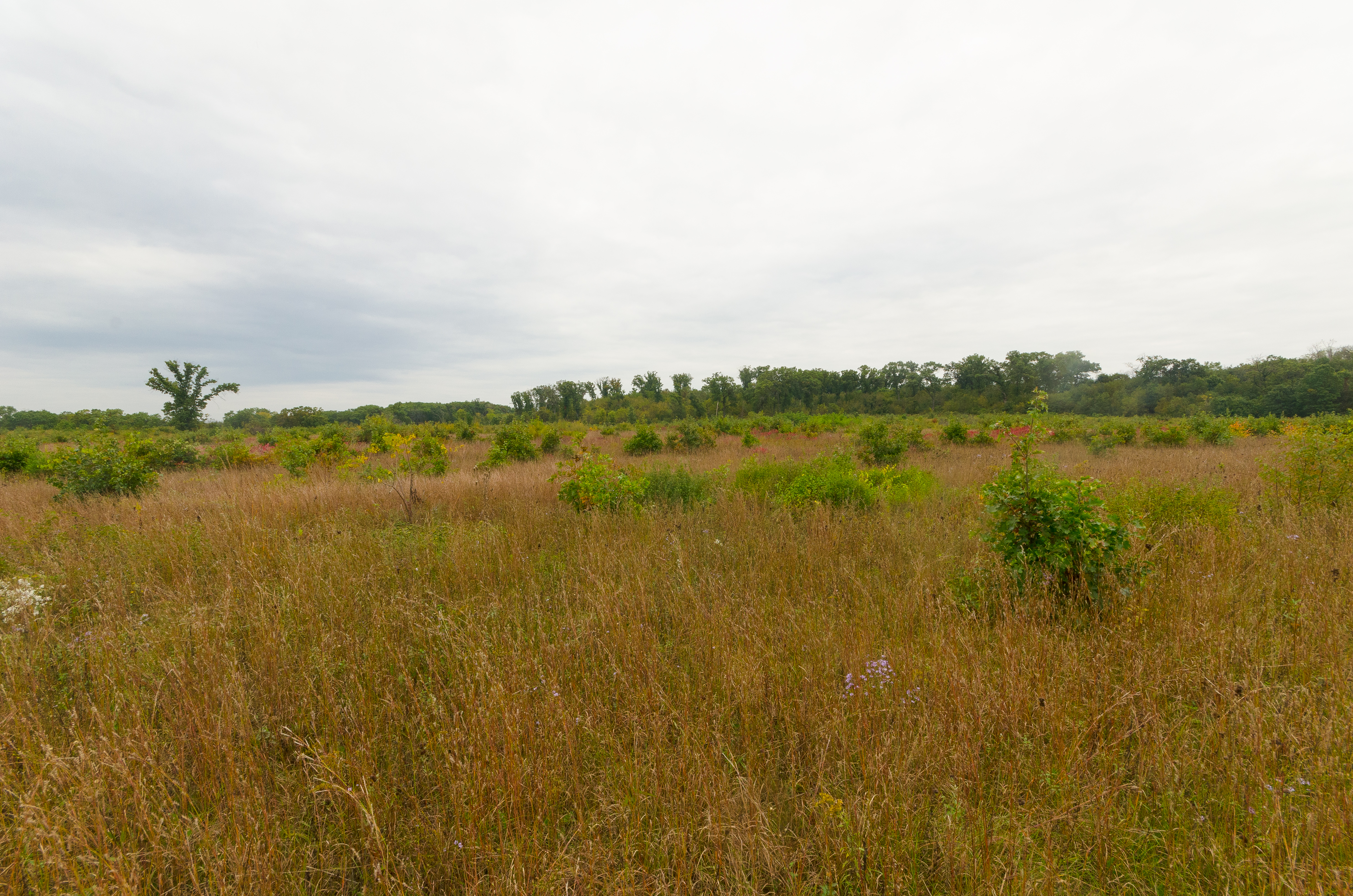
- Albany Sand Prairie and Oak Savamma

- Location within Wisconsin Location within the United States
- Location: Green County, Wisconsin
- Nearest city: Albany, Wisconsin
- Coordinates: 42°43′36″N 89°27′46″W
- Area: 2,007 acres (8.12 km^{2})
- Established: 1956
- Governing body: Wisconsin Department of Natural Resources

The Albany Wildlife Area (AWA) is a 2,007 acres (812 ha) tract of protected land located in Green County, Wisconsin, managed by the Wisconsin Department of Natural Resources (WDNR). Lands to be included in the wildlife area were first purchased in 1945 with the intention of them being used for inclusion in a new public area dedicated to hunting opportunities and conservation of indigenous species. That wildlife area was activated in 1956 as a Federal Aid Fish and Wildlife Restoration Project.

== Land cover ==
While the project boundary encompasses an area of 2,007 acres (812 ha), the WDNR only owns 1,427 acres (577 ha) in the area. The rest of the land grouped into the wildlife area is made up of leased land or other protected areas.

Cover type acreage
Cover type	Acres	Percentage cover
Agriculture	90	5%
Bottomland hardwoods	611	30%
Developed	3	<1%
Grassland	215	11%
Lowland shrub	505	24%
Marsh/emergent wetlands	30	2%
Non-forested wetlands	75	4%
Oak	100	5%
Oak savanna	45	2%
Prairie	125	6%
Upland conifers	6	<1%
Upland hardwood	145	7%
Water	75	4%
Total acreage	2,025	100%

== Flora and fauna ==
The wildlife area is a diverse environment, although for the most part tree cover consists of white oak, red oak, and American elm. Invasive species found in the area include garlic mustard, buckthorn, crown vetch, autumn olive and wild parsnip.
