= Befandriana Sud =

- Location in Madagascar
- Coordinates: 22°6′S 43°53′E
- Country: Madagascar
- Region: Atsimo-Andrefana
- District: Morombe
- Elevation: 145 m (476 ft)

Population (2001)
  - Total: 19,000
- Time zone: UTC3 (EAT)

Befandriana Sud or Befandriana Atsimo is a town and commune in Madagascar. It belongs to the district of Morombe, which is a part of Atsimo-Andrefana Region. The population of the commune was estimated to be approximately 19,000 in 2001 commune census.

Primary and junior level secondary education are available in town. The town provides access to hospital services to its citizens. The majority 70% of the population of the commune are farmers, while an additional 28% receives their livelihood from raising livestock. The most important crop is lima beans, while other important products are cassava, peas, rice and cowpeas. Services provide employment for 2% of the population.

== Roads ==
The commune is crossed by the RN9 from Toliara (Tulear) to Mandabe.

== See also ==
- Befandriana Nord
