= Mampikony Airport =

Airport in Madagascar

- IATA: WMP; ICAO: FMNP

Summary
- Location: Mampikony, Sofia Region, Madagascar
- Coordinates: 16°02′50.36″S 47°36′50.44″E
- Interactive map of Mampikony Airport

Mampikony Airport is an airport in Mampikony, Sofia Region, Madagascar.
