= Belaoka Marovato =

- Location in Madagascar
- Coordinates: 14°36′S 49°36′E
- Country: Madagascar
- Region: Sava
- District: Andapa
- Elevation: 517 m (1,696 ft)

Population (2001)
  - Total: 8,463
- Time zone: UTC3 (EAT)

Belaoka Marovato is a commune (Malagasy: kaominina) in northern Madagascar. It belongs to the district of Andapa, which is a part of Sava Region. According to 2001 census the population of Belaoka Marovato was 8,463.

Only primary schooling is available in town. The majority 99.5% of the population are farmers. The most important crop is rice, while other important products are pineapple, coffee and vanilla. Services provide employment for 0.5% of the population.
