= Mandritsara =

- Location in Madagascar
- Coordinates: 15°50′S 48°49′E
- Country: Madagascar
- Region: Sofia
- District: Mandritsara
- Elevation: 322 m (1,056 ft)

Population (2001)
  - Total: 17,000
- Time zone: UTC3 (EAT)
- Postal code: 415

Mandritsara [maɳɖʐiˈtsarə̥] is a city and commune (commune urbain, Malagasy: kaominina) in northern Madagascar. It belongs to the district of Mandritsara, which is a part of Sofia Region. The population of the commune was estimated to be approximately 17,000 in 2001 commune census.

Sofia river bassin, Mandritsara on the right

Farming and raising livestock provides employment for 40% and 35% of the working population. The most important crop is rice, while other important products are peanuts and cassava. Services provide employment for 25% of the population.

== Education ==
In addition to primary schooling the town offers secondary education at both junior and senior levels. The Social Sciences Training and Research Unit (UFRSS) is the Mandritsara branch of the University of Mahajanga.

== Healthcare ==
Mandritsara is home to Hopitaly Vaovao Mahafaly, a hospital which aims to show God’s love to those in need and to proclaim the Gospel of Jesus Christ to every patient. It has 70 inpatient beds, maternity facilities, and the only operating theatre for a 200km radius.

== Transport ==
- RN 32
- Mandritsara is served by a local airport.

== River ==
Mandritsara lies on the Mangarahara river, an affluent of the Sofia River.
