= Antsohihy =

Coordinates: 14°52′34.41″S 47°59′0.42″E

Antsohihy, Mahajanga
- commune urbaine
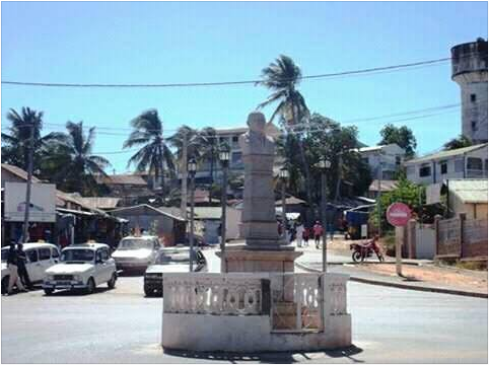

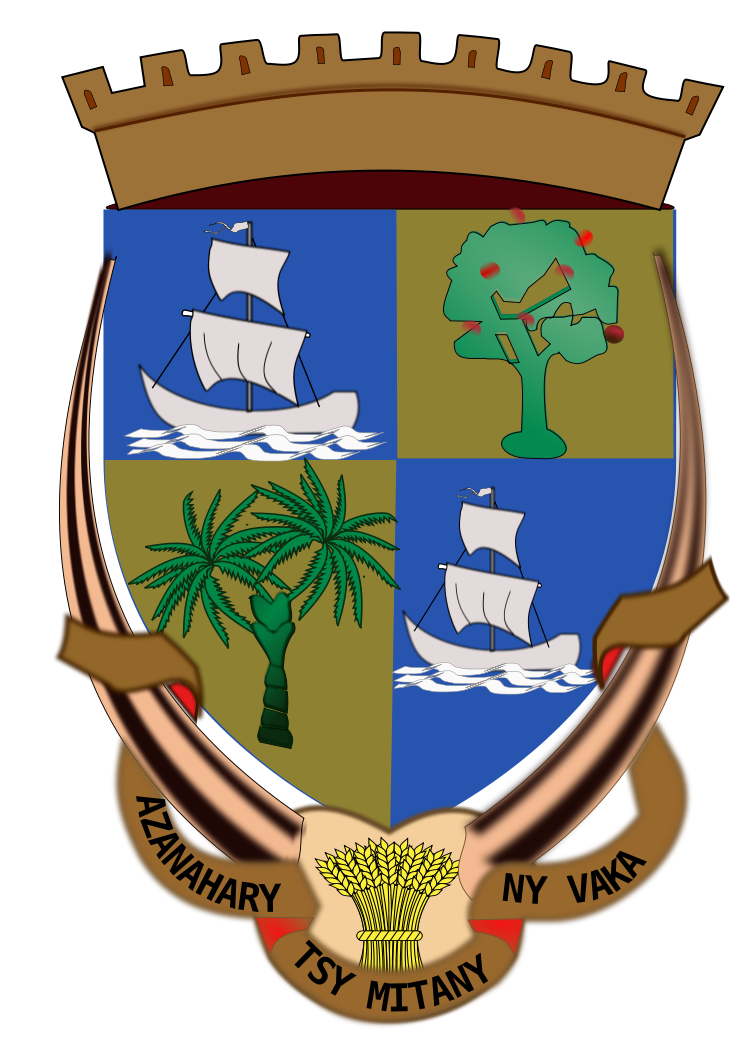
- Flag Seal
- Interactive map of Antsohihy, Mahajanga
- Country: Madagascar
- Region: Sofia
- District: Antsohihy

Area
  - Total: 20.6 km^{2} (8.0 sq mi)

Population (2018 census)
  - Total: 38,253
  - Density: 1,860/km^{2} (4,810/sq mi)
- postal code: 407
- Climate: Aw

Antsohihy is a city (commune urbaine) in northern Madagascar. It is the administrative capital of the Sofia Region.

== Geography ==
Antsohihy is the capital of Sofia Region and of Antsohihy District. It is situated at the junction of Route nationale 6 and Route nationale 32. Antsohihy is served by a local airport.

The town is crossed by the Loza River.

=== Climate ===
Climate data for Antsohihy (1991–2020)
Month	Jan	Feb	Mar	Apr	May	Jun	Jul	Aug	Sep	Oct	Nov	Dec	Year
Record high °C (°F)	37.6 (99.7)	36.8 (98.2)	37.3 (99.1)	36.6 (97.9)	36.6 (97.9)	35.8 (96.4)	35.5 (95.9)	37.2 (99.0)	38.2 (100.8)	40.3 (104.5)	39.6 (103.3)	38.9 (102.0)	40.3 (104.5)
Mean daily maximum °C (°F)	32.4 (90.3)	32.5 (90.5)	33.3 (91.9)	34.0 (93.2)	33.4 (92.1)	32.0 (89.6)	31.5 (88.7)	32.6 (90.7)	34.1 (93.4)	35.8 (96.4)	35.6 (96.1)	33.9 (93.0)	33.4 (92.1)
Daily mean °C (°F)	28.0 (82.4)	28.0 (82.4)	28.3 (82.9)	28.2 (82.8)	27.2 (81.0)	25.6 (78.1)	24.9 (76.8)	25.7 (78.3)	26.9 (80.4)	28.7 (83.7)	29.3 (84.7)	28.7 (83.7)	27.5 (81.5)
Mean daily minimum °C (°F)	23.6 (74.5)	23.5 (74.3)	23.3 (73.9)	22.5 (72.5)	20.9 (69.6)	19.1 (66.4)	18.3 (64.9)	18.8 (65.8)	19.6 (67.3)	21.7 (71.1)	22.9 (73.2)	23.5 (74.3)	21.5 (70.7)
Record low °C (°F)	19.2 (66.6)	16.2 (61.2)	16.4 (61.5)	16.5 (61.7)	14.7 (58.5)	14.3 (57.7)	13.5 (56.3)	14.5 (58.1)	13.4 (56.1)	15.7 (60.3)	15.7 (60.3)	18.5 (65.3)	13.4 (56.1)
Average precipitation mm (inches)	484.3 (19.07)	398.0 (15.67)	302.9 (11.93)	76.2 (3.00)	12.7 (0.50)	5.7 (0.22)	8.5 (0.33)	7.9 (0.31)	8.1 (0.32)	28.0 (1.10)	116.3 (4.58)	255.8 (10.07)	1,704.4 (67.10)
Average precipitation days (≥ 1.0 mm)	20.6	17.9	13.7	5.4	1.9	1.0	2.3	1.4	2.1	2.5	6.7	14.0	89.5
Source: NOAA

== Nature ==
- The Bora Reserve is located near Ansohihy.

== Education ==
The town hosts the annexes of the University Institute of Technology and Agronomy of Mahajanga (IUTAM), the University Institute of Management and Administration (IUGM) and the School of Law and Political Science (EDSP) of the University of Mahajanga.
