= Sofia Region =

Coordinates: 14.87961°S 47.987518°E

- Region
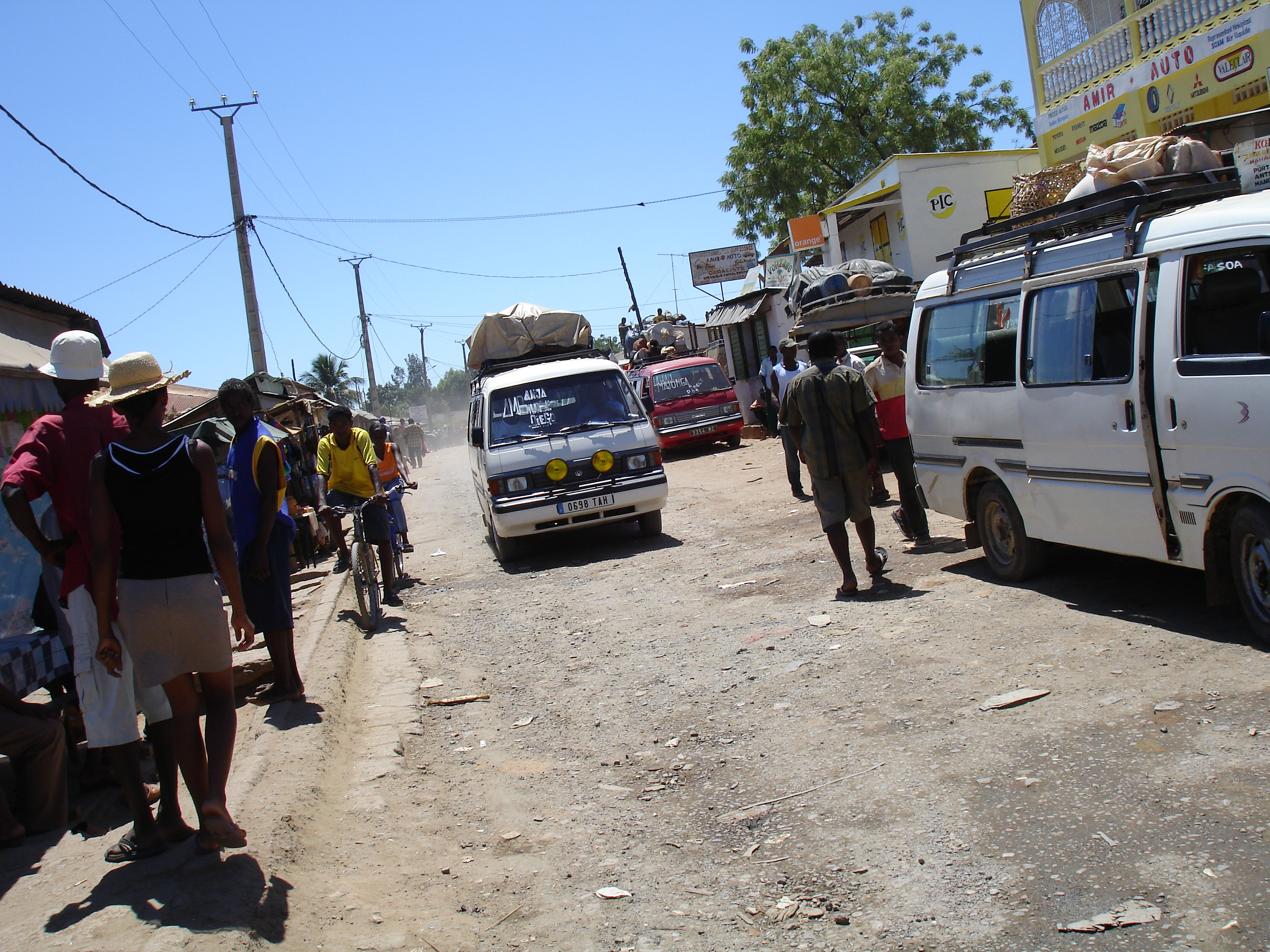
- Sofia

- Location in Madagascar
- Country: Madagascar
- Capital: Antsohihy

Government
  - Governor: René de Rolland Urbain Lylison

Area
  - Total: 50,100 km^{2} (19,300 sq mi)

Population (2018)
  - Total: 1,500,227
  - Density: 29.9/km^{2} (77.6/sq mi)
- Time zone: UTC3 (EAT)
- HDI (2018): 0.538 low · 6th of 22

Sofia is a region in northern Madagascar. It is named for the Sofia River. It is the second largest Malagasy region (behind Atsimo-Andrefana) with an area of 50,100 km² (19,300 sq mi), and had a population of 1,500,227 in 2018. Antsohihy is the administrative capital.

== Administrative divisions ==
Sofia Region is divided into seven districts, which are sub-divided into 108 communes.

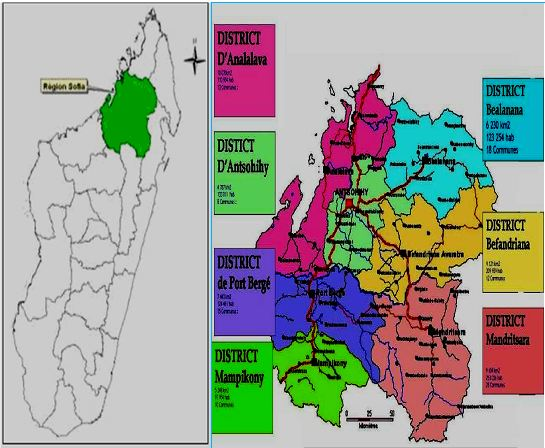
Sofia

- Analalava District - 11 communes
- Antsohihy District - 12 communes
- Bealanana District - 13 communes
- Befandriana-Nord District - 12 communes
- Boriziny-Vaovao District - 15 communes
- Mampikony District - 6 communes
- Mandritsara District - 22 communes

== Transport ==
=== Airports ===
- Analalava Airport
- Antsohihy Airport
- Bealanana Airport
- Befandriana-Avaratra Airport
- Mampikony Airport
- Mandritsara Airport
- Boriziny Vaovao Airport

=== Roads ===
Sofia is crossed by the National Road 4 (Antananarivo-Mahajanga), National Road 6 (Antsohihy-Diego Suarez), the National road 31 (Antsohihy to Mandritsara) and National road 32 (Antsohihy to Bealanana).

== Protected Areas ==
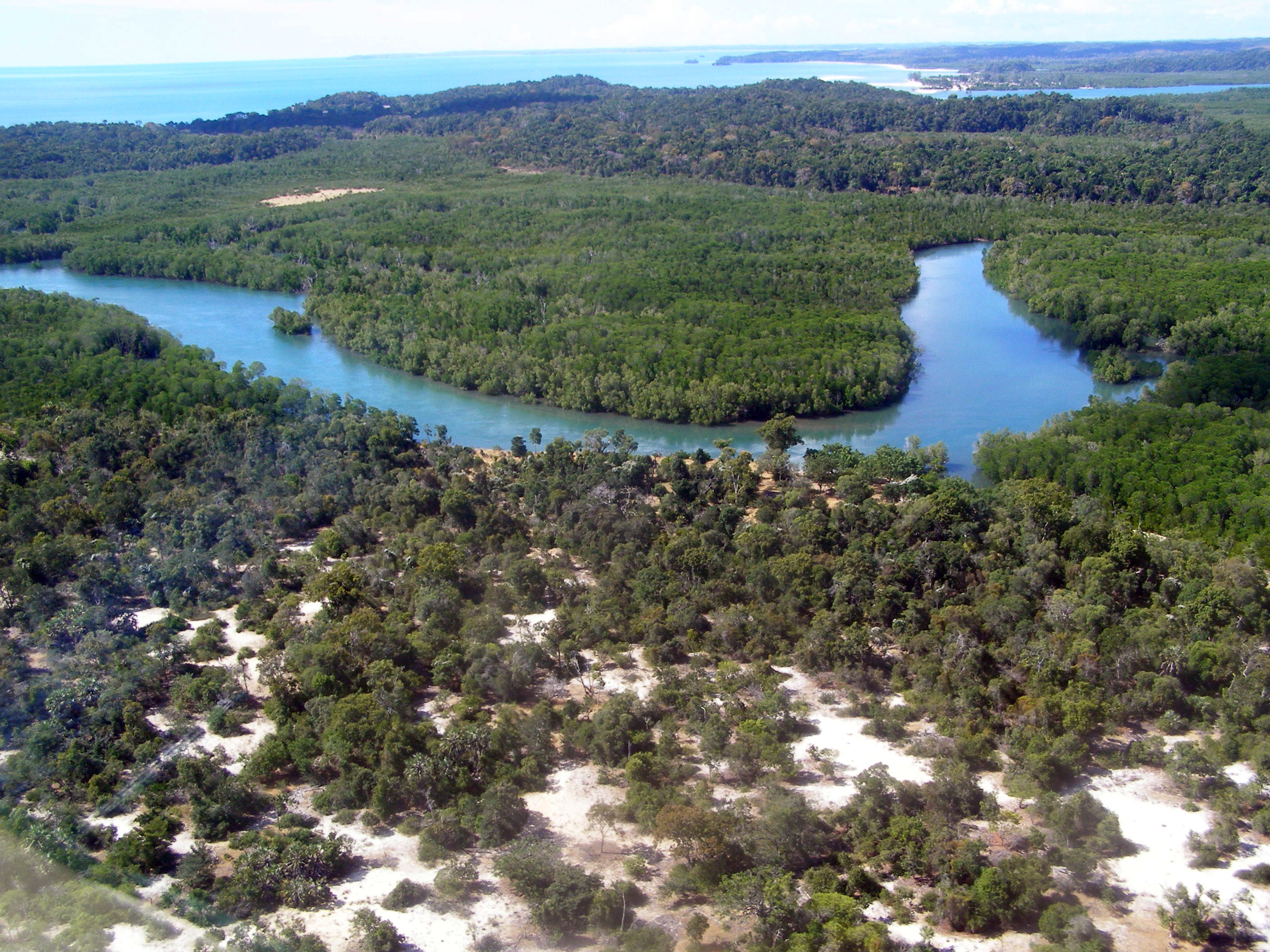
Mangroves of Anjajavy Forest

Sofia disposes of the highest concentration of mangroves in Madagascar with a total surface of 450 km2.

- Bongolava forest corridor
- Marotandrano Reserve
- Bora Reserve
- Tampoketsa Analamaitso Reserve
- Radama Islands/Sahamalaza National Park
- Bemanevika New Protected Area
- Mahimborondro New Protected Area
- Part of Makira Natural Park
- Anjajavy Forest New Protected Area
