= List of airports in Madagascar =

This is a list of airports in Madagascar, sorted by location.

== Airports ==
Airport names shown in bold have scheduled commercial airline service.

City served	Province	ICAO	IATA	Airport name	Coordinates
**Public airports**					
Ambanja	Antsiranana	FMNJ	IVA	Ampampamena Airport	13°39′S 048°28′E
Ambalavao	Fianarantsoa	FMSA		Ambalavao Airport	21°49′S 046°55′E
Ambatomainty	Mahajanga	FMMB	AMY	Ambatomainty Airport	17°41′S 045°37′E
Ambatondrazaka	Toamasina	FMMZ	WAM	Ambatondrazaka Airport	17°48′S 048°26′E
Ambilobe	Antsiranana	FMNE	AMB	Ambilobe Airport	13°11′18″S 048°59′17″E
Ambohijanahary	Toamasina	FMMJ		Ambohijanahary Airport	17°28′S 048°19′E
Ampanihy	Toliara	FMSY	AMP	Ampanihy Airport	24°41′59″S 044°44′03″E
Amparafaravola	Toamasina	FMMP		Amparafaravola Airport	17°39′S 048°13′E
Analalava	Mahajanga	FMNL	HVA	Analalava Airport	14°37′47″S 047°45′50″E
Andapa	Antsiranana	FMND	ZWA	Andapa Airport	14°39′06″S 049°37′14″E
Andavadoaka	Toliara		DVD	Andavadoaka Airport	22°06′40″S 043°16′14″E
Ankavandra	Toliara	FMMK	JVA	Ankavandra Airport	18°48′S 045°17′E
Ankazoabo	Toliara	FMSZ	WAK	Ankazoabo Airport	22°17′45″S 044°31′52″E
Antalaha	Antsiranana	FMNH	ANM	Antsirabato Airport	14°59′58″S 050°19′13″E
Antanànarìvo	Antananarivo	FMMI	TNR	**Ivato International Airport**	18°47′49″S 047°28′44″E
Antsalova	Mahajanga	FMMG	WAQ	Antsalova Airport	18°42′S 044°37′E
Antsirabe	Antananarivo	FMME	ATJ	Antsirabe Airport	19°50′13″S 047°03′55″E
Antsiranana	Antsiranana	FMNA	DIE	**Arrachart Airport**	12°20′58″S 049°17′30″E
Antsohihy	Mahajanga	FMNW	WAI	Ambalabe Airport	14°53′55″S 047°59′38″E
Bealanana	Mahajanga		WBE	Ankaizina Airport	14°32′S 048°42′E
Bekily	Toliara	FMSL	OVA	Bekily Airport	24°14′10″S 045°18′18″E
Belo sur Tsiribihina	Toliara	FMML	BMD	Belo sur Tsiribihina Airport	19°41′12″S 044°32′31″E
Befandriana-Avaratra	Mahajanga	FMNF	WBD	Befandriana-Avaratra Airport	15°12′S 048°29′E
Beroroha	Toliara	FMSB	WBO	Antsoa Airport	21°36′S 045°08′E
Besalampy	Mahajanga	FMNQ	BPY	Besalampy Airport	16°44′31″S 044°28′53″E
Betioky	Toliara	FMSV	BKU	Betioky Airport	23°44′S 044°23′E
Betroka	Toliara	FMSE		Betroka Airport	23°16′S 046°08′E
Boriziny Vaovao (Port Bergé)	Mahajanga	FMNG	WPB	Boriziny Vaovao Airport	15°35′S 047°37′E
Doany	Antsiranana		DOA	Doany Airport	14°22′05″S 049°30′39″E
Farafangana	Fianarantsoa	FMSG	RVA	Farafangana Airport	22°48′19″S 047°49′14″E
Fianarantsoa	Fianarantsoa	FMSF	WFI	Fianarantsoa Airport	21°26′30″S 047°06′42″E
Ihosy	Fianarantsoa	FMSI	IHO	Ihosy Airport	22°24′23″S 046°10′00″E
Ilaka Atsinanana, Atsinanana	Toamasina	FMMQ	ILK	Ilaka Atsinanana Airport (Atsinanana Airport)	19°35′S 048°48′E
Mahajanga (Majunga)	Mahajanga	FMNM	MJN	**Amborovy Airport** (Philibert Tsiranana Airport)	15°40′02″S 046°21′07″E
Mahanoro	Toamasina	FMMH	VVB	Mahanoro Airport	19°50′S 048°48′E
Maintirano	Mahajanga	FMMO	MXT	Maintirano Airport	18°03′01″S 044°02′00″E
Malaimbandy	Toliara	FMMC	WML	Malaimbandy Airport	20°21′S 045°33′E
Mampikony	Mahajanga	FMNP	WMP	Mampikony Airport	16°03′S 047°37′E
Manakara	Fianarantsoa	FMSK	WVK	Manakara Airport	22°07′11″S 048°01′18″E
Mananara Avaratra	Toamasina	FMNC	WMR	Mananara Avaratra Airport	16°09′50″S 049°46′26″E
Mananjary	Fianarantsoa	FMSM	MNJ	Mananjary Airport	21°12′06″S 048°21′30″E
Mandabe	Toliara	FMSC	WMD	Mandabe Airport	21°02′S 044°57′E
Mandritsara	Mahajanga	FMNX	WMA	Mandritsara Airport	15°50′S 048°50′E
Manja	Toliara	FMSJ	MJA	Manja Airport	21°25′33″S 044°18′55″E
Maroantsetra	Toamasina	FMNR	WMN	**Maroantsetra Airport**	15°26′12″S 049°41′18″E
Miandrivazo	Toliara	FMMN	ZVA	Miandrivazo Airport	19°33′46″S 045°27′03″E
Morafenobe	Mahajanga	FMMR	TVA	Morafenobe Airport	17°51′S 044°55′E
Morombe	Toliara	FMSR	MXM	Morombe Airport	21°45′14″S 043°22′32″E
Morondava	Toliara	FMMV	MOQ	**Morondava Airport**	20°17′05″S 044°19′03″E
Nosy Be (Nossi-bé)	Antsiranana	FMNN	NOS	**Fascene Airport**	13°18′43″S 048°18′53″E
Sainte-Marie (Nosy Boraha)	Toamasina	FMMS	SMS	**Sainte Marie Airport**	17°05′38″S 049°48′57″E
Sambava	Antsiranana	FMNS	SVB	**Sambava Airport**	14°16′43″S 050°10′29″E
Soalala	Mahajanga	FMNO	DWB	Soalala Airport	16°06′03″S 045°21′24″E
Tambohorano	Mahajanga	FMMU	WTA	Tambohorano Airport	17°28′34″S 043°58′22″E
Tanandava	Toliara	FMSN	TDV	Samangoky Airport	21°42′S 043°44′E
Toamasina (Tamatave)	Toamasina	FMMT	TMM	**Toamasina Airport**	18°06′34″S 049°23′33″E
Tôlanaro (Tolagnaro)	Toliara	FMSD	FTU	**Tôlanaro Airport** (Marillac Airport)	25°02′17″S 046°57′22″E
Toliara (Tulear)	Toliara	FMST	TLE	**Toliara Airport**	23°23′00″S 043°43′42″E
Tsaratanana	Mahajanga	FMNT	TTS	Tsaratanana Airport	16°45′S 047°37′E
Tsiroanomandidy	Antananarivo	FMMX	WTS	Tsiroanomandidy Airport	18°45′S 046°03′E
Vangaindrano	Fianarantsoa	FMSU	VND	Vangaindrano Airport	23°21′06″S 047°34′44″E
Vatomandry	Toamasina	FMMY	VAT	Vatomandry Airport	19°23′S 048°57′E
Vohemar (Vohimarina)	Antsiranana	FMNV	VOH	Vohemar Airport	13°22′33″S 050°00′10″E
**Military airports**					
Antsiranana	Antsiranana	FMNK		Andrakaka Navy Field	12°15′12″S 049°15′12″E
Arivonimamo	Antananarivo	FMMA		Arivonimamo Airbase	19°01′44″S 047°10′19″E

== See also ==
- Transport in Madagascar
- Military of Madagascar § Aircraft
- List of airports by ICAO code: F#Madagascar
- Wikipedia: WikiProject Aviation/Airline destination lists: Africa#Madagascar
