= List of cities in Madagascar =

This is a list of major cities in Madagascar with population (1993 census and 2018 census), region, and former province. These are listed in order of their 2018 population. Note that these are the populations of the cities themselves (i.e. administrative districts, except in the case of Ambovombe) and exclude the populations of suburban communes outside the cities; some of the communes adjacent to Antananarivo have more than 100,000 population themselves.

Name	Former name	1993 Pop.	2018 Pop.	Region	Province
Antananarivo	Tananarive	710,236	1,275,207	Analamanga	Antananarivo
Toamasina	Tamatave	137,782	326,286	Atsinanana	Toamasina
Antsirabe		126,062	245,592	Vakinankaratra	Antananarivo
Mahajanga	Majunga	106,780	244,722	Boeny	Mahajanga
Fianarantsoa		109,248	189,879	Haute Matsiatra	Fianarantsoa
Toliara	Tuléar	80,826	169,760	Atsimo-Andrefana	Toliara
Antsiranana	Diégo-Suarez	59,040	131,165	Diana	Antsiranana

== Smaller cities and towns ==
This is an alphabetically-ordered list of smaller cities and towns in Madagascar with population (1993 census and 2001 estimate), region, and province.

Name	1993 Pop.	2001 Est.	Region	Province
Ambalavao	19,714	26,000	Haute Matsiatra	Fianarantsoa
Ambanja	21,498	27,000	Diana	Antsiranana
Ambatoboeny (Ambato Boeny)	15,073	19,000	Boeny	Mahajanga
Ambatofinandrahana	18,286	24,000	Amoron'i Mania	Fianarantsoa
Ambatolampy	18,809	24,000	Vakinankaratra	Antananarivo
Ambatomainty			Melaky	Mahajanga
Ambatondrazaka	27,711	36,000	Alaotra-Mangoro	Toamasina
Ambenja			Boeny	Mahajanga
Ambilobe	10,275	13,000	Diana	Antsiranana
Amboasary	24,531	31,000	Anosy	Toliara
Ambohidratrimo		23,649	Analamanga	Antananarivo
Ambohimahamasina			Haute Matsiatra	Fianarantsoa
Ambohimahasoa		11,670	Haute Matsiatra	Fianarantsoa
Ambositra	21,350	28,000	Amoron'i Mania	Fianarantsoa
Ampanihy	17,463	22,000	Atsimo-Andrefana	Toliara
Amparafaravola	33,098	43,000	Alaotra-Mangoro	Toamasina
Analalava		12,724	Sofia	Mahajanga
Andapa	14,602	18,000	Sava	Antsiranana
Andilamena	12,688	16,000	Alaotra-Mangoro	Toamasina
Andramasina			Vakinankaratra	Antananarivo
Anjozorobe	12,574	16,000	Analamanga	Antananarivo
Ankazoabo	17,650	22,000	Atsimo-Andrefana	Toliara
Ankazobe	10,390	13,000	Analamanga	Antananarivo
Anosibe An'ala	16,938	22,000	Alaotra-Mangoro	Toamasina
Antalaha	23,949	30,000	Sava	Antsiranana
Antanambao Manampotsy			Atsinanana	Toamasina
Antanifotsy	46,674	59,000	Vakinankaratra	Antananarivo
Antsalova			Melaky	Mahajanga
Antsirambazaha (Andoany, Hell-Ville) Nosy Be (Nossi-bé)	15,923	20,000	Diana	Antsiranana
Antsohihy	14,244	18,000	Sofia	Mahajanga
Arivonimamo	14,527	18,000	Itasy	Antananarivo
Bealanana	11,339	14,000	Sofia	Mahajanga
Befandriana-Avaratra (Befandriana Nord)		17,625	Sofia	Mahajanga
Befotaka			Atsimo-Atsinanana	Fianarantsoa
Bekily			Androy	Toliara
Beloha	15,651	20,000	Androy	Toliara
Belo Tsiribihina (Belon'i Tsiribihina, Belo sur Tsiribihina)	16,249	20,000	Menabe	Toliara
Benenitra			Atsimo-Andrefana	Toliara
Beroroha	12,667	16,000	Atsimo-Andrefana	Toliara
Besalampy		11,576	Melaky	Mahajanga
Betafo	19,684	25,000	Vakinankaratra	Antananarivo
Betioky	21,145	27,000	Atsimo-Andrefana	Toliara
Betroka		17,652	Anosy	Toliara
Boriziny (Port-Bergé)		23,237	Sofia	Mahajanga
Fandriana	22,113	29,000	Amoron'i Mania	Fianarantsoa
Farafangana	17,419	23,000	Atsimo-Atsinanana	Fianarantsoa
Faratsiho	24,824	32,000	Vakinankaratra	Antananarivo
Fenoarivo (Fenoarivobe, Fenoarivo Be, Fenoarivo Afovoany)	12,956	16,000	Bongolava	Antananarivo
Fenoarivo Atsinanana (Fénérive Est)	13,514	18,000	Analanjirofo	Toamasina
Iakora			Ihorombe	Fianarantsoa
Ifanadiana	12,340	16,000	Vatovavy-Fitovinany	Fianarantsoa
Ihosy	11,951	16,000	Ihorombe	Fianarantsoa
Ikalamavony	10,974	14,000	Haute Matsiatra	Fianarantsoa
Ikongo	22,772	30,000	Vatovavy-Fitovinany	Fianarantsoa
Ivohibe			Ihorombe	Fianarantsoa
Kandreho			Betsiboka	Mahajanga
Maevatanana			Betsiboka	Mahajanga
Mahabo		18,019	Menabe	Toliara
Mahanoro	25,620	33,000	Atsinanana	Toamasina
Maintirano			Melaky	Mahajanga
Mampikony		25,288	Sofia	Mahajanga
Manakara (Manakara-Atsimo)	24,970	33,000	Vatovavy-Fitovinany	Fianarantsoa
Mananara Avaratra (Mananara Nord)	26,474	34,000	Ambatosoa	Toamasina
Manandriana	13,328	18,000	Amoron'i Mania	Fianarantsoa
Mananjary	19,474	26,000	Vatovavy-Fitovinany	Fianarantsoa
Mandritsara		30,963	Sofia	Mahajanga
Manja		20,691	Menabe	Toliara
Manjakandriana	21,042	27,000	Analamanga	Antananarivo
Maroantsetra	15,328	20,000	Ambatosoa	Toamasina
Marolambo	16,806	22,000	Atsinanana	Toamasina
Marovoay	20,910	27,000	Boeny	Mahajanga
Miarinarivo			Itasy	Antananarivo
Miandrivazo	14,026	18,000	Menabe	Toliara
Midongy-Atsimo (Midongy Sud)			Atsimo-Atsinanana	Fianarantsoa
Mitsinjo			Boeny	Mahajanga
Morafenobe			Melaky	Mahajanga
Moramanga	18,767	24,000	Alaotra-Mangoro	Toamasina
Morombe		22,627	Atsimo-Andrefana	Toliara
Morondava	25,021	31,000	Menabe	Toliara
Nosy Varika	26,133	34,000	Vatovavy-Fitovinany	Fianarantsoa
Sainte-Marie (Nosy-Boraha)			Analanjirofo	Toamasina
Sakaraha	14,839	19,000	Atsimo-Andrefana	Toliara
Sambava	22,131	28,000	Sava	Antsiranana
Soalala		14,397	Boeny	Mahajanga
Soanierana Ivongo	25,229	33,000	Analanjirofo	Toamasina
Soavinandriana	26,734	34,000	Itasy	Antananarivo
Tôlanaro (Tolagnaro, Tola'aro, Faradofay)	30,690	39,000	Anosy	Toliara
Tsaratanana	11,214	14,000	Betsiboka	Mahajanga
Tsiombe	20,277	26,000	Androy	Toliara
Tsiroanomandidy	17,883	23,000	Bongolava	Antananarivo
Vangaindrano	16,546	22,000	Atsimo-Atsinanana	Fianarantsoa
Vatomandry		15,959	Atsinanana	Toamasina
Vavatenina	23,716	31,000	Analanjirofo	Toamasina
Vohemar (Vohémar)		23,187	Sava	Antsiranana
Vohibinany (Ampasimanolotra, Brickaville)	16,261	21,000	Atsinanana	Toamasina
Vohipeno		14,613	Vatovavy-Fitovinany	Fianarantsoa
Vondrozo	14,032	19,000	Atsimo-Atsinanana	Fianarantsoa

== See also ==
- List of cities in East Africa
