= ISO 3166-2:MG =

Entry for Madagascar in ISO 3166-2

ISO 3166-2:MG is the entry for Madagascar in ISO 3166-2, part of the ISO 3166 standard published by the International Organization for Standardization (ISO), which defines codes for the names of the principal subdivisions (e.g., provinces or states) of all countries coded in ISO 3166-1.

Currently for Madagascar, ISO 3166-2 codes are defined for six provinces. The provinces were scheduled to be abolished in 2009, and the country would be divided into 22 regions.

Each code consists of two parts separated by a hyphen. The first part is MG, the ISO 3166-1 alpha-2 code of Madagascar. The second part is a letter.

== Current codes ==
Subdivision names are listed as in the ISO 3166-2 standard published by the ISO 3166 Maintenance Agency (ISO 3166/MA).

Click on the button in the header to sort each column.

Code	Subdivision name (mg)
MG-T	Antananarivo
MG-D	Antsiranana
MG-F	Fianarantsoa
MG-M	Mahajanga
MG-A	Toamasina
MG-U	Toliara

== See also ==
- Subdivisions of Madagascar
- FIPS region codes of Madagascar
