= Subdivisions of Madagascar =

Structure

== Regions ==
Madagascar is currently divided into 24 regions. A law enacted in 2004 established 22 regions. In 2021, Vatovavy-Fitovinany was split into the regions of Fitovinany and Vatovavy. The law creating Ambatosoa from the northern part of Analanjirofo was enacted in 2023 and the new region was inaugurated in 2025.

The regions are grouped into six provinces which are mentioned in the constitution and laws of Madagascar. However, the provinces perform no administrative function in practice and are only relevant in certain circumstances, e.g., they serve as electoral districts for the Senate.

- Antananarivo Province
  - Analamanga
  - Bongolava
  - Itasy
  - Vakinankaratra
- Antsiranana Province
  - Diana
  - Sava
- Fianarantsoa Province
  - Amoron'i Mania
  - Atsimo Atsinanana
  - Fitovinany
  - Haute-Matsiatra
  - Ihorombe
  - Vatovavy
- Mahajanga Province
  - Betsiboka
  - Boeny
  - Melaky
  - Sofia
- Toamasina Province
  - Alaotra Mangoro
  - Ambatosoa
  - Analanjirofo
  - Atsinanana
- Toliara Province
  - Androy
  - Anosy
  - Atsimo Andrefana
  - Menabe

== Districts ==
The 24 regions are further divided into districts. By law, the capital Antananarivo is divided into six districts, but administration of the capital has been consolidated into a single unit, the Commune Urbaine d'Antananarivo. Thus while Madagascar is officially divided into 119 districts, many sources treat Antananarivo as a single district, giving a total of 114 districts.

== Communes ==
The districts are divided into 1695 communes, the lowest level of administrative subdivision in Madagascar.

== History ==
During the Second Republic (1975-1991) the country had five levels of administrative subdivisions:

1. Faritany (province)
2. Fivondronana (or fivondronampokontany)
3. Firaisana (or firaisampokontany)
4. Fokontany
5. Fokonolona

Today there are four levels of divisions:

1. Faritany mizakatena (autonomous province)
2. Faritra (region)
3. Departemanta (department)
4. Kaominina (commune)

The constitution of 1992 ruled that the country should be organized in decentralized territorial entities. The name, number, and limits of territorial entities should be determined by law. In the law passed by the national assembly in 1994, three such entity levels were defined: region (faritra), department (departemanta) and commune (kaominina). The communes were created in 1996.

With Didier Ratsiraka back in power, the constitution was changed in 1998, to include and specifically mention six autonomous provinces, divided into undefined regions and communes. The autonomous provinces, having the same names and territories as the already existing provinces, were created in 2000.

During the power struggle after the presidential elections in 2001, five of those provinces, whose governors supported Ratsiraka, declared themselves independent from the republic. The new president, Ravalomanana, replaced the provincial governments by special delegations, appointed by the president. This effectively means that the autonomous provinces have ceased to exist as such, although it remains unclear whether they will remain in place.

In 2004, the regions were created by the national assembly in law no. 2004-001. The 28 regions originally proposed had become 22. Although they are subdivisions of the provinces, they are representatives (and representing the people) of the republic, not the province. The regions will also take over the assets of the "ex-Fivondronampokontany". It is also mentioned that the communes are the only entities that are operational, and there will be an unspecified period of transition to the new system. The departments are not mentioned in the law, instead the designation "components" of the regions is used. It appears that the departments will be based on the Fivondronampokontany, although it is unclear whether they are already in place and what it means that the assets will be taken over by the regions.

== See also ==
- List of cities in Madagascar
