= Ranked list of Malagasy provinces =

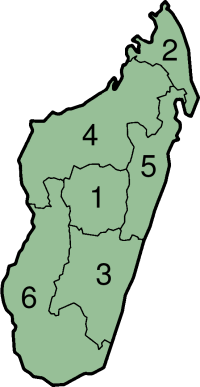

These are ranked lists of the provinces of Madagascar. Population figures are from 2001.

== By population ==
Rank	Province	Population	%	Density
1	Antananarivo (1)	4,580,788	29.2%	78.6
2	Fianarantsoa (3)	3,366,291	21.5%	32.6
3	Toamasina (5)	2,593,063	16.5%	36.1
4	Toliara (6)	2,229,500	14.2%	13.8
5	Mahajanga (4)	1,733,917	11.0%	11.6
6	Antsiranana (2)	1,188,425	7.6%	27.4
	Madagascar	15,691,984	100%	26.7

== By area ==
Rank	Province	Area (km^{2})	%	Density
1	Toliara (6)	161,405	27.4%	13.8
2	Mahajanga (4)	150,023	25.5%	11.6
3	Fianarantsoa (3)	103,272	17.6%	32.6
4	Toamasina (5)	71,911	12.2%	36.1
5	Antananarivo (1)	58,283	9.9%	78.6
6	Antsiranana (2)	43,406	7.4%	27.4
	Madagascar	588,300	100%	26.7

== By population density ==
Rank	Province	Population	Area (km^{2})	Density
1	Antananarivo (1)	4,580,788	58,283	78.6
2	Toamasina (5)	2,593,063	71,911	36.1
3	Fianarantsoa (3)	3,366,291	103,272	32.6
4	Antsiranana (2)	1,188,425	43,406	27.4
5	Toliara (6)	2,229,500	161,405	13.8
6	Mahajanga (4)	1,733,917	150,023	11.6
	Madagascar	15,691,984	588,300	26.7
