= Vehicle registration plates of Madagascar =

Republic of Madagascar
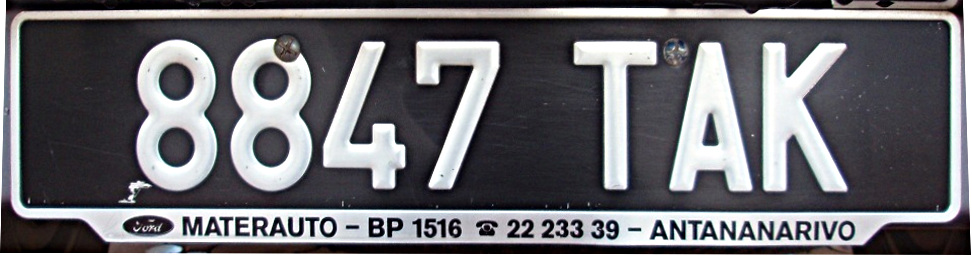
- Malagasy regular legal standard number plate.
- Country: Madagascar
- Country code: RM

Current series
- Size: 520 mm × 110 mm 20.5 in × 4.3 in
- Serial format: 1234 XAB (X being the regional code)
- Colour (front): White on black
- Colour (rear): White on black

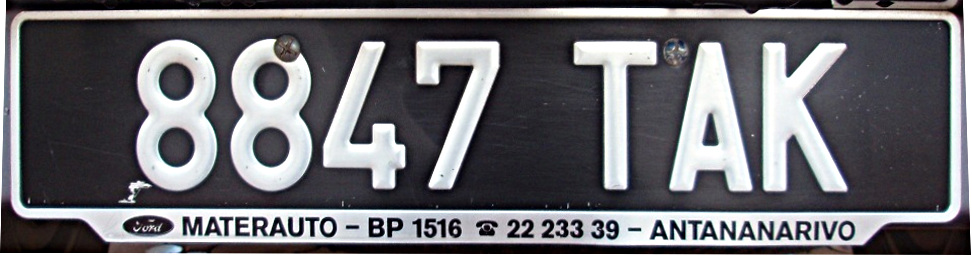
Current license plate of Madagascar, with T for a code for Antananarivo province

The vehicle registration plates of Madagascar are created in 1950 from time to time with the revised version in 2014. It contains a black plate consisting with white characters with the current format (1234 XAB) with 4 random numbers, with the first letter as a province code, and the last 2 random letters.

== History ==
License plate of Toamasina. White license plate with black lettering were resolved until 2014.

The license plate system of Madagascar draws on the system of France actively used from 1950 to 2009. The current system has been in use since 1959. The identifier shall neither plaques that provide information on the technical condition of the vehicle information, nor stamp. Also dimensions of the indicator, the execution and the font are not specified exactly. There are both metal (aluminum) and plastic indicator ago, versions with and without edge and modern imported from France blanks of Euro plate that the left margin bear the European flag with the country code letters F, and this was not challenged. June 2014, is respected by the authorities again that the prescribed basic color black is used.

Until 2014, the license plate showing white text on black background, with aluminum plate scripture by removing the black coating production reasons silver precipitates. Decorative typefaces other than the new FE-Schrift are officially not allowed, but are tolerated in private vehicles.

== Province codes ==
Normal license plate have four digits followed by two or three letters. Here, the first letter indicates the province in which the vehicle is registered:

- A for Toamasina Province
- D for Antsiranana Province
- F for Fianarantsoa Province
- M for Mahajanga Province
- T for Antananarivo Province
- U for Toliara Province

Marks are numbered consecutively, 9999 upon reaching the point is again at 0001 and continued the following letters of the alphabet in the last position on the plate. Due to the higher registration numbers, a sequence of three letters is required for Antananarivo, all other provinces have so far only license plate with a maximum of two letters.

== Other license plates ==
=== Temporary license plates ===
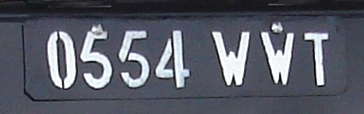
Temporary number plates of Antananarivo.

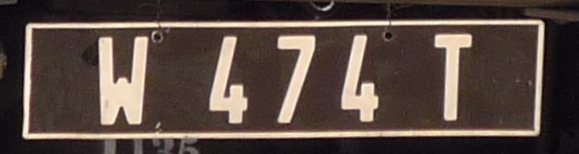
Temporary number plates for traders, approved in Antananarivo

After the purchase of a vehicle or a change of ownership are up to the granting of the final mark temporary license plates in use, their letters begins with WW, followed by the code letters for each province. In contrast to the normal license plate, they have up to five digits.

Another form of temporary license plates is assigned to dealers and workshops for test or transfer journeys. These characteristics have only one W, followed by a three-digit number and the provincial codes.

=== Military plates ===
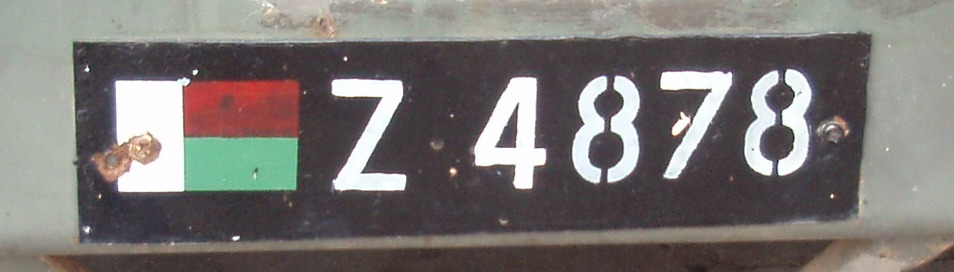
Military license plates

Gendarmerie and military have their own characteristics that are different from the normal license plate by the national flag on the left edge and the letter Z, which stands for Zandarimaria gendarmerie or T carry the letter Z (Tafika = military), which is for traffic military. The execution of this indicator is always with white letters on a black background.

=== Diplomatic plates ===
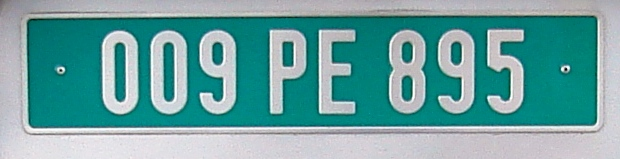
License plate of an international organization (009 is a code for France)

Vehicles of diplomats and international organizations have green license plates with black or white text and the letters CD (Corps Diplomatique), CMD (Chef de Mission Diplomatique), CMC (Chef de Mission Consulaire) or PE (Personnel Expatrié). The first three digits form a code for the country of origin of the diplomat (as 009 for France), the digits after the letters are assigned consecutively for approved vehicles. First three digits and their corresponding significations

Code	Country/Organisation
001	Algeria
002	Germany
004	China
007	Japan
008	USA
009	France
010	United Kingdom
011	l'Inde
013	Iran
015	Japan International Cooperation Agency (JICA)
201	World Bank
202	UN FAO
205	UN OMS
206	UNDP
207	UNICEF
208	UNFPA
209	UN WFP
215	UN OIM
300	WWF

=== Other plates ===
Vehicles government departments have awarded red flags are like the normal license plate with black or white text, numbers and letter combinations.
