= List of political and geographic subdivisions by total area from 50,000 to 200,000 square kilometers =

This is one of a series of comprehensive lists of continents, countries, and first level administrative country subdivisions such as states, provinces, and territories, as well as certain political and geographic features of substantial area. References for the information provided in this table may be found in the individual articles on each body listed herein. Some divisions are listed twice, with one listing including territory that is excluded in the other for various reasons, including territorial disputes. There is intentional overlap among the lists in order to maximize ease of use.

Geographic entity	Area (km^{2})	Notes
Kyrgyzstan	199,900	Country in Central Asia.
South Dakota	199,731	State of the United States.
(Democratic Republic of the Congo) Tshopo	199,567	Province of the Democratic Republic of the Congo.
Paraná	199,315	State of Brazil.
(China) Ruoqiang County	199,222	County of China. Largest third-level administrative division in the world.
(Angola) Cuando Cubango Province	199,049	Second largest province of Angola.
Senegal	196,722	Country in Africa.
(Canada) Ellesmere Island	196,236	Third-largest island in the Arctic Archipelago.
Gujarat	196,024	State of India.
(Kazakhstan) Kostanay Province	196,000	Province of Kazakhstan.
North Yemen	195,000	Former country in the Middle East from 1967 to 1990; now reunified into Yemen.
Sverdlovsk Oblast	194,800	Federal subject of Russia.
Karnataka	191,791	State of India.
Kingdom of the Lombards	189,418	A Germanic Kingdom in northern Italy, lasting from 568-774.
(China) Hebei	187,700	Province of China.
(China) Jilin	187,400	Province of China.
(United States) New England	186,447	Division of the United States. Maine, New Hampshire, Vermont, Massachusetts, Connecticut and Rhode Island.
(China) Hubei	185,900	Province of China.
Syria (including disputed areas)	185,180	Country in Middle East. Including the Golan Heights.
Washington	184,665	State of the United States.
Syria (non-disputed areas)	183,885	Country in Middle East. Excluding the Golan Heights.
North Dakota	183,112	State of the United States.
(Mauritania) Hodh Ech Chargui	182,700	Third largest region of Mauritania.
Sonora	182,052	State of Mexico.
(Iran) Sistan and Baluchestan province	181,785	Largest province of Iran.
Oklahoma	181,035	State of the United States.
Cambodia	181,035	Country in Southeast Asia.
(Iran) Kerman province	180,836	Second largest province of Iran.
(Indonesia) Sulawesi	180,681	Island of Indonesia.
Missouri	180,533	State of the United States.
Amazonas (Venezuelan state)	180,145	Second largest state of Venezuela.
(China) Guangdong	180,000	Province of China.
Novosibirsk Oblast	178,200	Federal subject of Russia.
Nenets Autonomous Okrug	176,700	Federal subject of Russia.
Somaliland	176,210	Historic region of Somalia.
(China) Guizhou	176,000	Province of China.
Uruguay	175,016	Country in South America.
(Kenya) Rift Valley Province	173,854	Largest province of Kenya.
(Saudi Arabia) Al Madinah (Medina)	173,000	Third largest province of Saudi Arabia.
Republic of Karelia	172,400	Federal subject of Russia.
(Mali) Gao Region	170,572	Second largest region of Mali.
Tuva Republic	170,500	Federal subject of Russia.
Florida	170,304	State of the United States.
(Democratic Republic of the Congo) Kasai-Oriental	170,302	Province of the Democratic Republic of the Congo.
Wisconsin	169,639	State of the United States.
Altai Krai	169,100	Federal subject of Russia.
Eastern Cape	168,966	Second largest province of South Africa.
(Yemen) Hadhramaut Governorate	167,280	Largest governorate of Yemen.
(China) Jiangxi	167,000	Province of China.
(China) Henan	167,000	Province of China.
Primorsky Krai	165,900	Federal subject of Russia.
(Kazakhstan) Mangystau Province	165,600	Province of Kazakhstan.
Karakalpakstan	165,600	Largest region of Uzbekistan.
(Ömnögovi Province) Ömnögovi	165,400	Largest aimag of Mongolia.
Córdoba	165,321	Province of Argentina.
Kingdom of the Burgundians	164,166	A Germanic Kingdom in west-central France, lasting from 411-533.
(Saudi Arabia) Makkah Province	164,000	Province of Saudi Arabia.
Suriname	163,820	Country in South America.
Tunisia	163,610	Country in Africa.
(Algeria) Béchar Province	162,200	Province of Algeria.
Tyumen Oblast	161,800	Federal subject of Russia.
(Madagascar) Toliara Province	161,405	Largest Province of Madagascar.
(Namibia) ǁKaras Region	161,215	Largest region of Namibia.
Padania	160,908	Regional Area of Northern Italy as claimed by the Lega Nord
Perm Krai	160,600	Federal subject of Russia.
(Kenya) Eastern Province	159,891	Second largest Province of Kenya.
Amhara Region	159,174	Third largest region of Ethiopia.
(Algeria) Tindouf Province	159,000	Province of Algeria.
(Sudan) South Kordufan	158,355	State of Sudan.
Shan State	158,222	Largest state of Myanmar (Myanmar has certain administrative divisions titled as Divisions, and others titled as States).
(China) Shanxi	156,300	Province of China.
Odisha	155,707	State of India.
Salta	155,488	Province of Argentina.
Georgia (U.S. state)	153,909	State of the United States.
(China) Shandong	153,800	Province of China.
Central Kalimantan	153,564	Province of Indonesia.
Acre	152,581	State of Brazil.
(Mali) Kidal Region	151,430	Third largest region of Mali.
West Kazakhstan Province	151,300	Province of Kazakhstan.
(New Zealand) South Island	150,437	Largest island of New Zealand.
(Madagascar) Mahajanga Province	150,023	Second largest Province of Madagascar.
Old Assyrian period	150,000	An ancient Middle Eastern kingdom in the Fertile Crescent, lasting from 1920-1740 BC.
Illinois	149,998	State of the United States.
Coahuila	149,982	State of Mexico.
Mendoza	148,827	Province of Argentina.
Ceará	148,826	State of Brazil.
(Democratic Republic of the Congo) Bas-Uele	148,331	Province of the Democratic Republic of the Congo.
(Zambia) Northern Province	147,826	Largest province of Zambia.
(Botswana) Central District	147,730	Largest district of Botswana.
Nepal	147,181	Country in South Asia.
West Kalimantan	146,807	Province of Indonesia.
(China) Liaoning	145,900	Province of China.
Iowa	145,743	State of the United States.
Vologda Oblast	145,700	Federal subject of Russia.
(Niger) Zinder Department	145,430	Second largest department of Niger.
Murmansk Oblast	144,900	Federal subject of Russia.
(Iran) Razavi Khorasan province	144,681	Third largest province of Iran.
(Kazakhstan) Zhambyl Province	144,000	Province of Kazakhstan.
Bangladesh	143,998	Country in Southeast Asia.
Bashkortostan	143,600	Federal subject of Russia.
La Pampa	143,440	Province of Argentina.
Tajikistan	143,100	Country in Central Asia.
Amapá	142,815	State of Brazil.
(Govi-Altai Province) Govi-Altai	141,400	Second largest aimag of Mongolia.
New York	141,299	State of the United States.
Sindh	140,914	Third largest province of Pakistan.
(Niger) Diffa Department	140,216	Third largest department of Niger.
Omsk Oblast	139,700	Federal subject of Russia.
(China) Anhui	139,700	Province of China.
(Morocco) Laâyoune-Boujdour-Sakia El Hamra	139,480	Largest region of Morocco.
Republic of Yucatán	139,426	Sovereign country in North America, 1841–1848.
North Carolina	139,389	State of the United States.
(Saudi Arabia) Al Jawf Province	139,000	Province of Saudi Arabia.
(Indonesia) Java	138,794	Island of Indonesia.
(Turkmenistan) Balkan Province	138,000	Largest province of Turkmenistan.
Arkansas	137,732	State of the United States.
Santiago del Estero	136,351	Province of Argentina.
Alabama	135,765	State of the United States.
Chhattisgarh	135,194	State of India.
(Democratic Republic of the Congo) Tanganyika Province	134,940	Province of the Democratic Republic of the Congo.
Louisiana	134,264	State of the United States.
La Paz Department	133,985	Third largest department of Bolivia.
Santa Fe	133,007	Province of Argentina.
(Democratic Republic of the Congo) Tshuapa	132,940	Province of the Democratic Republic of the Congo.
(Democratic Republic of the Congo) Haut-Katanga Province	132,425	Province of the Democratic Republic of the Congo.
(Antártica Chilena Province) Magallanes and Antártica Chilena	132,297	Largest region of Chile (including Antarctic claims).
(Democratic Republic of the Congo) Maniema	132,250	Province of the Democratic Republic of the Congo.
Greece	131,957	Country in Europe.
England	130,395	Largest constituent country of the United Kingdom.
Tamil Nadu	130,058	State of India.
Nicaragua	130,000	Largest country in Central America; excludes San Andrés y Providencia islands (disputed territories with Colombia).
(Botswana) North-West District	129,930	Second largest district of Botswana.
Free State (South African province)	129,825	Third largest province of South Africa.
Kingdom of Poland	129,707	Medieval central European Kingdom, lasting from 1025-1569 when it formed a union with Lithuania. Size is approximate.
Western Cape	129,462	Province of South Africa.
(Iran) Yazd province	129,285	Province of Iran.
(Mozambique) Niassa Province	129,056	Largest province of Mozambique.
Czechoslovakia	127,900	Central European country between 1918 and 1992.
(Democratic Republic of the Congo) Mai-Ndombe Province	127,465	Province of the Democratic Republic of the Congo.
(Sudan) South Darfur	127,300	State of Sudan.
(Saudi Arabia) Northern Borders Region	127,000	Province of Saudi Arabia.
(Kenya) North Eastern Province	126,902	Third largest province of Kenya.
(Zambia) Western Province	126,386	Second largest province of Zambia.
(Zambia) North-Western Province	125,827	Third largest province of Zambia.
Limpopo	125,754	Province of South Africa.
Mississippi	125,434	State of the United States.
(Antofagasta Region) Antofagasta	125,306	Largest region of Chile (excluding Antarctic claims).
(Saudi Arabia) Ha'il Province	125,000	Province of Saudi Arabia.
(Kazakhstan) Pavlodar Province	124,800	Province of Kazakhstan.
Sarawak	124,450	Largest state of Malaysia.
Orenburg Oblast	124,000	Federal subject of Russia.
(Dornod Province) Dornod	123,600	Third largest aimag of Mongolia.
North Kazakhstan Province	123,200	Province of Kazakhstan.
Durango	123,181	State of Mexico.
(Morocco) Guelmim-Es Semara	122,825	Second largest region of Morocco.
(Iran) Fars province	122,608	Province of Iran.
(Sudan) Jungoli	122,479	State of Sudan.
(Tsardom of Bulgaria (1908–1946)) Kingdom of Bulgaria	122,134	Measured at apex before WWI.
(Sudan) River Nile	122,123	State of Sudan.
(Kazakhstan) Akmola Province	121,400	Province of Kazakhstan.
(Democratic Republic of the Congo) Lualaba Province	121,308	Province of the Democratic Republic of the Congo.
(China) Fujian	121,300	Province of China.
Kirov Oblast	120,800	Federal subject of Russia.
North Korea	120,538	Country in Asia.
Emirate of Granada	120,337	Moorish Vassal to the Kingdom of Castile lasting from 1228-1492, measured at its apex in 1228.
(Mali) Kayes Region	119,743	Region of Mali.
Overseas France	119,396	Consists of all the French-administered territories outside Europe.
Pennsylvania	119,283	State of the United States.
(Saudi Arabia) Najran Province	119,000	Province of Saudi Arabia.
South Kazakhstan Province	118,600	Province of Kazakhstan.
(Kazakhstan) Atyrau Province	118,600	Province of Kazakhstan.
Malawi	118,484	Country in Africa.
Potosí Department	118,218	Department of Bolivia.
(Botswana) Ghanzi District	117,910	Third largest district of Botswana.
Eritrea	117,600	Country in Africa. Includes Badme region.
Lake Michigan-Huron	117,300	Lake in North America, between Canada and the United States.
Ohio	116,096	State of the United States.
(Bayankhongor Province) Bayankhongor	116,000	Aimag of Mongolia.
Puntland	116,000	Historic region of Somalia.
(Greenland) Qeqqata	115,500	Second smallest municipality of Greenland.
(Namibia) Kunene Region	115,293	Second largest region of Namibia.
Telangana	114,840	A state of India, which was formed on 2 June 2014.
(Chad) Kanem	114,520	Second largest region of Chad.
Volgograd Oblast	113,900	Federal subject of Russia.
(New Zealand) North Island	113,729	Second largest island of New Zealand.
Benin	112,622	Country in Africa.
(Ethiopia) Southern Nations, Nationalities, and People's Region	112,343	Region of Ethiopia.
(Magallanes y la Antártica Chilena Region) Magallanes and Antártica Chilena	112,310	Second largest region of Chile (excluding Antarctic claims).
Honduras	112,088	Country in Central America.
Kingdom of Sicily	111,900	A medieval kingdom centered on the Island of Sicily and in southern Italy, lasting from 1130-1282.
Kingdom of the Two Sicilies	111,900	A kingdom centered on the Island of Sicily and in southern Italy, lasting from 1811-1861.
Liberia	111,369	Country in Africa.
Bulgaria	110,912	Country in Europe.
Cuba	110,861	Largest country in the Caribbean.
(Uzbekistan) Navoiy Region	110,800	Second largest region of Uzbekistan.
Virginia	110,785	State of the United States.
(Philippines) Luzon	109,965	Island of the Philippines.
(Amazonas (Colombian department)) Amazonas Department	109,665	Largest district of Colombia.
(Namibia) Hardap Region	109,651	Third largest region of Namibia.
(Dornogovi Province) Dornogovi	109,500	Aimag of Mongolia.
Tennessee	109,151	State of the United States.
(Cameroon) East Province	109,011	Largest province of Cameroon.
Guatemala	108,889	Country in Central America.
(Canada) Newfoundland	108,860	Island in Canada.
East Germany	108,333	Former country in Europe from 1949 to 1990; now reunified into Germany.
(Democratic Republic of the Congo) Haut-Lomami Province	108,204	Province of the Democratic Republic of the Congo.
(Saudi Arabia) Tabuk Province	108,000	Province of Saudi Arabia.
(Aysén Region) Aisén	107,153	Third largest region of Chile.
(Iran) Isfahan province	107,029	Province of Iran.
(Botswana) Kgalagadi District	106,940	District of Botswana.
(Niger) Tahoua Department	106,677	Department of Niger.
Cuba (main island)	105,806	Main island of the Caribbean country of Cuba.
(Namibia) Otjozondjupa	105,185	Region of Namibia.
(Mozambique) Zambezia Province	105,008	Second largest province of Mozambique.
(Democratic Republic of the Congo) Sankuru	105,000	Province of the Democratic Republic of the Congo.
(South Africa) North West	104,882	Province of South Africa.
Kentucky	104,659	State of the United States.
Kingdom of Aragon	103,088	Constituent Kingdom of Spain lasting from 1035-1515.
Iceland	103,000	Country in Europe.
Anangu Pitjantjatjara Yankunytjatja	103,000	Australian local government area
(Angola) Lunda Norte Province	102,783	Third largest province of Angola.
Catamarca	102,602	Province of Argentina.
(China) Jiangsu	102,600	Province of China.
(Madagascar) Fianarantsoa Province	102,373	Third largest Province of Madagascar.
(China) Zhejiang	102,000	Province of China.
(Department of Ucayali) Ucayali Region	101,831	Second largest region of Peru.
Rostov Oblast	100,800	Federal subject of Russia.
(Mozambique) Tete Province	100,724	Third largest province of Mozambique.
(Khövsgöl Province) Khövsgöl	100,600	Aimag of Mongolia.
Vichada Department	100,242	Second largest district of Colombia.
Saratov Oblast	100,200	Federal subject of Russia.
Chaco	99,633	Province of Argentina.
South Korea	99,538	Country in Asia.
(Oman) Dhofar Governorate	99,300	Largest governorate of Oman.
Sagaing Region	99,150	Largest region of Myanmar, second largest administrative entity (Myanmar has certain administrative divisions titled as Regions, and others titled as States).
(Finland) Lapland	98,946	Largest province of Finland.
Norrbotten County	98,911	Largest county of Sweden.
Pernambuco	98,312	State of Brazil.
(Western Province (Papua New Guinea)) Western Province (Papua New Guinea)	98,189	Largest Province of Papua New Guinea.
(Angola) Malanje Province	97,602	Province of Angola.
(Philippines) Mindanao	97,530	Second-largest island of the Philippines.
(Iran) Semnan Province	97,491	Province of Iran.
Afar Region	96,707	Region of Ethiopia.
(Mali) Koulikoro Region	95,848	Region of Mali.
(Democratic Republic of the Congo) Kasaï Province	95,631	Province of the Democratic Republic of the Congo.
Kemerovo Oblast	95,500	Federal subject of Russia.
Santa Catarina	95,346	State of Brazil.
(Mauritania) Tagant	95,200	Region of Mauritania.
(Turkmenistan) Ahal Province	95,000	Second largest province of Turkmenistan.
(Zambia) Central Province	94,395	Province of Zambia.
KwaZulu-Natal	94,361	Third smallest province of South Africa.
Indiana	94,321	State of the United States.
Castile and León	94,223	Largest autonomous community of Spain.
Bihar	94,164	State of India.
Neuquén	94,078	Province of Argentina.
(Turkmenistan) Lebap Province	94,000	Province of Turkmenistan.
Oaxaca	93,952	State of Mexico.
(South Sudan) West Bahr-al-Ghazal	93,900	Second largest state of South Sudan.
Hungary	93,032	Country in Central Europe.
Altai Republic	92,600	Federal subject of Russia.
Portugal	91,982	Country in Europe. Includes Azores and Madeira Islands.
(Boquerón Department) Boquerón department	91,669	Largest department of Paraguay.
Maine	91,646	State of the United States.
(Russia) Novaya Zemlya	90,650	Archipelago part of Russia.
(Democratic Republic of the Congo) Kwango	89,974	Province of the Democratic Republic of the Congo.
(Democratic Republic of the Congo) Haut-Uele	89,683	Province of the Democratic Republic of the Congo.
La Rioja	89,680	Province of Argentina.
San Juan	89,651	Province of Argentina.
(Niger) Tillabéri Department	89,623	Department of Niger.
(Angola) Cunene Province	89,342	Province of Angola.
Jordan	89,342	Country in Middle East.
Caquetá Department	88,965	Third largest district of Colombia.
(Chad) Batha Region	88,800	Third largest region of Chad.
Serbia	88,361	Country in Europe. Includes UN-administered territory of Kosovo.
Corrientes	88,199	Province of Argentina.
Chelyabinsk Oblast	87,900	Federal subject of Russia.
Kachin State	87,808	Second largest state of Myanmar, third largest administrative entity (Myanmar has certain administrative divisions titled as Regions, and others titled as States).
Andalusia	87,268	Second largest autonomous community of Spain.
Sakhalin Oblast	87,100	Federal subject of Russia.
(Turkmenistan) Mary Province	87,000	Second smallest province of Turkmenistan.
(Central African Republic) Haute-Kotto	86,650	Largest prefecture of the Central African Republic.
Azerbaijan	86,600	Country in Central Asia. Includes the exclave of Nakhichevan Autonomous Republic and the Nagorno-Karabakh region.
Kingdom of Naples	86,192	A medieval kingdom centered in southern Italy, lasting from 1282-1811/1816.
(Algeria) Ghardaïa Province	86,105	Province of Algeria.
Meta Department	85,635	District of Colombia.
Northern Region, Uganda	85,391.7	Largest region of Uganda.
(Department of Madre de Dios) Madre de Dios Region	85,301	Third largest region of Peru.
(Zambia) Southern Province	85,283	Province of Zambia.
Giza Governorate	85,153	Governorate of Egypt.
(Namibia) Omaheke	84,612	Region of Namibia.
Leningrad Oblast	84,500	Federal subject of Russia.
Ireland	84,421	An island off the northwest coast of Europe.
Tver Oblast	84,100	Federal subject of Russia.
Nouvelle-Aquitaine	84,036	Largest region of France.
Austria	83,858	Country in Europe.
(India) Arunachal Pradesh	83,743	State of India.
(Kenya) Coast Province	83,603	Province of Kenya.
United Arab Emirates	83,600	Country in Middle East.
French Guiana	83,534	Largest overseas department of France.
Hokkaidō	83,424.31	Largest prefecture of Japan.
South Carolina	82,932	State of the United States.
(Morocco) Oriental	82,900	Third largest region of Morocco.
(Mozambique) Cabo Delgado Province	82,625	Province of Mozambique.
(South Sudan) East Equatoria	82,542	State of South Sudan.
(Zavkhan Province) Zavkhan	82,500	Aimag of Mongolia.
Lake Superior	82,414	Lake in North America, between Canada and the United States.
(China) Chongqing	82,403	Largest direct-controlled municipality of China.
(Alto Paraguay Department) Alto Paraguay	82,349	Second largest department of Paraguay.
(Sükhbaatar Province) Sükhbaatar	82,300	Aimag of Mongolia.
Riau	82,232	Province of Indonesia.
(Mozambique) Nampula Province	81,606	Province of Mozambique.
Kingdom of León	81,342	A medieval kingdom constituent of Spain, lasting from 910-1301. Measured at its apex after 1030.
(Saudi Arabia) 'Asir	81,000	Province of Saudi Arabia.
Jalisco	80,386	State of Mexico.
(Khentii Province) Khentii	80,300	Aimag of Mongolia.
Jharkhand	79,700	State of India.
(Oman) Al Wusta Governorate	79,700	Second largest governorate of Oman.
Castile-La Mancha	79,463	Third largest autonomous community of Spain.
(Sudan) West Darfur	79,460	State of Sudan.
Tamaulipas	79,384	State of Mexico.
(South Sudan) West Equatoria	79,319	Third largest tate of South Sudan.
(Morocco) Meknès-Tafilalet	79,210	Region of Morocco.
(Mali) Mopti Region	79,017	Region of Mali.
(Algeria) El Bayadh Province	78,870	Province of Algeria.
Czech Republic	78,866	Country in Central Europe.
Entre Ríos	78,781	Province of Argentina.
Scotland	78,772	Second largest constituent country of the United Kingdom.
Assam	78,483	State of India.
(Atacama Region) Atacama	78,268	Region of Chile.
(Democratic Republic of the Congo) Kwilu Province	78,219	Province of the Democratic Republic of the Congo.
Bohai Sea	78,000	A marginal sea in China.
(Sudan) Upper Nile	77,773	State of South Sudan.
Nizhny Novgorod Oblast	76,900	Federal subject of Russia.
Gadsden Purchase	76,800	Territory in Arizona acquired by the US in 1854.
San Luis	76,748	Province of Argentina.
Apure	76,500	Third largest state of Venezuela.
Mpumalanga	76,495	Second smallest province of South Africa.
(Chad) Ouaddaï	76,240	Region of Chad.
(Tanzania) Tabora	76,151	Largest region of Tanzania.
Sabah	76,115	Second largest state of Malaysia.
Republic of Kalmykia	76,100	Federal subject of Russia.
(Khovd Province) Khovd	76,100	Aimag of Mongolia.
Krasnodar Krai	76,000	Federal subject of Russia.
(Mozambique) Gaza Province	75,709	Province of Mozambique.
Panama	75,517	Country in Central America.
(Sudan) Gedarif	75,263	State of Sudan.
(Tanzania) Rukwa	75,240	Second largest region of Tanzania.
(Zimbabwe) Matabeleland North	75,025	Largest province of Zimbabwe.
(Angola) Huíla Province	75,002	Province of Angola.
(Dundgovi Province) Dundgovi	74,700	Aimag of Mongolia.
(Khyber Pakhtunkhwa) North-West Frontier Province	74,521	Province of Pakistan.
(Indonesia) Maluku Islands	74,505	Archipelago in eastern Indonesia.
Chiapas	74,211	State of Mexico.
Western Finland	74,185	Second largest province of Finland.
(Töv Province) Töv	74,000	Aimag of Mongolia.
(Turkmenistan) Daşoguz Province	74,000	Smallest province of Turkmenistan.
Hispaniola	73,929	Island in the Caribbean split between the countries of Haiti and Dominican Republic.
Baja California Sur	73,475	State of Mexico.
Kingdom of Castile	73,299	A medieval kingdom constituent of Spain, lasting from 1035-1230.
Zacatecas	73,252	State of Mexico.
New Brunswick	72,908	Province of Canada.
(Presidente Hayes Department) Presidente Hayes	72,907	Third largest department of Paraguay.
South Sulawesi	72,781	Province of Indonesia.
(Nigeria) Borno State	72,767	Largest state of Nigeria.
Occitanie	72,724	Second largest region in Metropolitan France.
(Libya) Ghat District	72,700	District of Libya.
Federally Administered Northern Areas, Pakistan	72,520	Province of Pakistan.
(Russia) Sakhalin	72,493	Island in Russia.
Guainía Department	72,238	District of Colombia.
(Guinea) Kankan Region	72,145	Largest region of Guinea.
Formosa	72,066	Province of Argentina.
(Nigeria) Niger State	72,065	Second largest state of Nigeria.
Cusco Region	71,986	Region of Peru.
(Madagascar) Toamasina Province	71,911	Province of Madagascar.
Sierra Leone	71,740	Country in Africa.
Veracruz	71,699	State of Mexico.
North Sumatra	71,680	Province of Indonesia.
Kurgan Oblast	71,000	Federal subject of Russia.
(Morocco) Souss-Massa-Drâa	70,880	Region of Morocco.
(Tanzania) Morogoro	70,799	Third largest region of Tanzania.
(Iran) Hormozgan Province	70,669	Province of Iran.
Bavaria	70,549	Largest state of Germany.
Catalan Countries	70,520	The territories where Catalan language is spoken
(Ghana) Northern Region	70,383	Largest region of Ghana.
(Angola) Bié Province	70,314	Province of Angola.
(Mali) Sikasso Region	70,280	Region of Mali.
Republic of Ireland	70,273	Country in Europe.
(Canada) Banks Island	70,028	Island in the Arctic Archipelago.
Baja California	69,921	State of Mexico.
Auvergne-Rhône-Alpes	69,711	Third largest region in Metropolitan France.
Georgia	69,700	Country in Caucasus.
(Uvs Province) Uvs	69,600	Aimag of Mongolia.
(Iran) South Khorasan Province	69,555	Province of Iran.
Lake Victoria	69,485	Lake in Africa between Kenya, Tanzania, and Uganda.
(Zambia) Eastern Province	69,106	Province of Zambia.
(Cameroon) Centre Province	68,926	Second largest province of Cameroon.
(Mozambique) Inhambane Province	68,615	Province of Mozambique.
Tasmania	68,401	State of Australia.
Central Sulawesi	68,089	Province of Indonesia.
(Mozambique) Sofala Province	68,018	Province of Mozambique.
Republic of Tatarstan	68,000	Federal subject of Russia.
(Mauritania) Trarza	67,800	Region of Mauritania.
(Emirate of Abu Dhabi) Abu Dhabi Emirate	67,340	Largest emirate of the United Arab Emirates.
(Yemen) Al Mahrah Governorate	67,310	Second largest governorate of Yemen.
Kingdom of Toledo	67,273	A kingdom of the Spanish reconquista lasting from 1085-1212.
Puno Region	66,997	Region of Peru.
(Japan) Tōhoku region	66,947.25	Region of Japan containing the prefectures of Aomori, Iwate, Miyagi, Akita, Yamagata and Fukushima.
(Japan) Chūbu region	66,806.31	Region of Japan containing the prefectures of Niigata, Toyama, Ishikawa, Fukui, Yamanashi, Nagano, Gifu, Shizuoka and Aichi.
Stavropol Krai	66,500	Federal subject of Russia.
(Tanzania) Ruvuma	66,477	Region of Tanzania.
(Algeria) Djelfa Province	66,415	Province of Algeria.
(China) Ningxia	66,400	Smallest autonomous region of China.
(Tanzania) Lindi	66,046	Region of Tanzania.
(Republic of the Congo) Likouala	66,044	Largest department of the Republic of the Congo.
(Democratic Republic of the Congo) Ituri Province	65,658	Province of the Democratic Republic of the Congo.
Sri Lanka	65,610	Country in Asia.
(Cameroon) North Province	65,576	Third largest province of Cameroon.
Lithuania	65,300	Country in Europe.
(Democratic Republic of the Congo) Sud-Kivu	65,070	Province of the Democratic Republic of the Congo.
(Saudi Arabia) Al-Qassim Province	65,000	Province of Saudi Arabia.
Guárico	64,986	State of Venezuela.
(Mali) Ségou Region	64,821	Smallest region of Mali (excluding the Capital district).
Latvia	64,600	Country in Europe.
Guerrero	64,281	State of Mexico.
Nuevo León	64,210	State of Mexico.
(Tajikistan) Gorno-Badakhshan	64,200	Largest province of Tajikistan.
(Iran) Khuzestan Province	64,055	Province of Iran.
Lincoln Sea	64,000	Sea of the Arctic Ocean.
Pando Department	63,827	Department of Bolivia.
Antioquia Department	63,612	District of Colombia.
(Namibia) Erongo Region	63,579	Region of Namibia.
Arequipa Region	63,345	Region of Peru.
Zulia	63,100	State of Venezuela.
San Luis Potosí	63,068	State of Mexico.
(Chad) Salamat	63,000	Region of Chad.
(Övörkhangai Province) Övörkhangai	62,900	Aimag of Mongolia.
West Virginia	62,755	State of the United States.
(Cameroon) Adamawa Province	63,691	Province of Cameroon.
(Tanzania) Mbeya	62,420	Region of Tanzania.
Republic of Khakassia	61,900	Federal subject of Russia.
(Mozambique) Manica Province	61,661	Province of Mozambique.
Central Region, Uganda	61,403.2	Second largest region of Uganda.
(Central African Republic) Mbomou	61,150	Second largest prefecture of the Central African Republic.
Kostroma Oblast	60,100	Federal subject of Russia.
Michoacán	59,928	State of Mexico.
Lake Huron	59,596	Lake in North America, between Canada and the United States.
(Democratic Republic of the Congo) Nord-Kivu	59,483	Province of the Democratic Republic of the Congo.
(Nigeria) Taraba State	59,180	Third largest state of Nigeria.
(Democratic Republic of the Congo) Kasaï-Central	59,111	Province of the Democratic Republic of the Congo.
(Chad) Guéra	58,950	Region of Chad.
(Tanzania) Iringa	58,936	Region of Tanzania.
(Angola) Uíge Province	58,698	Province of Angola.
(Afghanistan) Helmand Province	58,584	Largest province of Afghanistan.
Sinaloa	58,328	State of Mexico.
(Madagascar) Antananarivo Province	58,283	Province of Madagascar.
(Central African Republic) Bamingui-Bangoran	58,200	Third largest prefecture of the Central African Republic.
(Democratic Republic of the Congo) Mongala	58,141	Province of the Democratic Republic of the Congo.
(Angola) Namibe Province	58,137	Province of Angola.
Lake Michigan	58,000	Lake in North America, between Canada and the United States.
Grand Est	57,441	Region in northeastern France.
(Zimbabwe) Mashonaland West	57,441	Second largest province of Zimbabwe.
Aceh	57,366	Province of Indonesia.
(Finland) Oulu Province	57,000	Province of Finland.
Togo	56,785	Country in Africa.
(Democratic Republic of the Congo) Nord-Ubangi	56,644	Province of the Democratic Republic of the Congo.
Croatia	56,594	Country in Europe.
(Zimbabwe) Masvingo	56,566	Third largest province of Zimbabwe.
Paraíba	56,440	State of Brazil.
(Democratic Republic of the Congo) Lomami Province	56,426	Province of the Democratic Republic of the Congo.
(Republic of the Congo) Sangha	55,800	Second largest department of the Republic of the Congo.
Himachal Pradesh	55,673	State of India.
(Angola) Cuanza Sul Province	55,660	Province of Angola.
Cochabamba Department	55,631	Department of Bolivia.
(Central African Republic) Haut-Mbomou	55,530	Prefecture of the Central African Republic.
Västerbotten County	55,401	Second largest county of Sweden.
Pskov Oblast	55,300	Federal subject of Russia.
Novgorod Oblast	55,300	Federal subject of Russia.
(Arkhangai Province) Arkhangai	55,300	Aimag of Mongolia.
Western Region, Uganda	55,276.6	Second smallest region of Uganda.
(Canada) Devon Island	55,247	Island in the Arctic Archipelago, largest uninhabited island in the world.
(Afghanistan) Herat Province	54,778	Second largest province of Afghanistan.
(Algeria) El Oued Province	54,573	Province of Algeria.
(Zimbabwe) Matabeleland South	54,172	Province of Zimbabwe.
Vaupés Department	54,135	District of Colombia.
(Afghanistan) Kandahar Province	54,022	Third largest province of Afghanistan.
(Democratic Republic of the Congo) Kongo Central	53,920	Province of the Democratic Republic of the Congo.
Samara Oblast	53,600	Federal subject of Russia.
Oruro Department	53,588	Department of Bolivia.
Uttarakhand	53,566	State of India.
Guaviare Department	53,460	District of Colombia.
Jambi	53,437	Province of Indonesia.
South Sumatra	53,435	Province of Indonesia.
(Mauritania) Hodh El Gharbi	53,400	Region of Mauritania.
Nova Scotia	53,338	Province of Canada.
Jujuy	53,219	Province of Argentina.
Rio Grande do Norte	52,797	State of Brazil.
(Democratic Republic of the Congo) Sud-Ubangi	51,648	Province of the Democratic Republic of the Congo.
Voronezh Oblast	52,400	Federal subject of Russia.
(Czech Republic) Bohemia	52,065	Historical region of the Czech Republic.
Chuquisaca Department	51,524	Department of Bolivia.
San Martín Region	51,253	Region of Peru.
Bosnia and Herzegovina	51,197	Country in Europe.
Costa Rica	51,180	Country in Central America. Includes Isla del Coco.
(Morocco) Oued Ed-Dahab-Lagouira	50,880	Region of Morocco.
Campeche	50,812	State of Mexico.
(Tanzania) Shinyanga	50,781	Region of Tanzania.
(Los Lagos Region) Los Lagos	50,609	Region of Chile.
(Zambia) Luapula Province	50,567	Province of Zambia.
(Pakistan) Chagai	50,545	Largest District of Pakistan
(Punjab, Pakistan) Punjab	50,362	State of India.
Republic of Dagestan	50,300	Federal subject of Russia.
(Central African Republic) Ouham	50,250	Prefecture of the Central African Republic.
Quintana Roo	50,212	State of Mexico.
Tigray Region	50,079	Region of Ethiopia.

== See also ==
Other divisions

- 0.1 to 1,000,000+ square kilometers
- 1,000,000+ square kilometers

Smaller divisions

- 200,000+ square kilometers • 100,000 to 1,000,000 square kilometers • 50,000 to 200,000 square kilometers • 20,000 to 50,000 square kilometers
- 5,000 to 20,000 square kilometers • 1,000 to 5,000 square kilometers • 0.1 to 1,000 square kilometers
- 500,000 to 1,000,000 square kilometers • 200,000 to 500,000 square kilometers • 100,000 to 200,000 square kilometers
- 50,000 to 100,000 square kilometers • 30,000 to 50,000 square kilometers • 20,000 to 30,000 square kilometers • 10,000 to 20,000 square kilometers
- 7,000 to 10,000 square kilometers • 5,000 to 7,000 square kilometers • 3,000 to 5,000 square kilometers • 1,000 to 3,000 square kilometers
- 250 to 1,000 square kilometers • 50 to 250 square kilometers • Under 50 square kilometers

Other

- List of countries and dependencies by area
- List of largest empires
- List of administrative divisions by country
- Category:Ranked lists of country subdivisions
