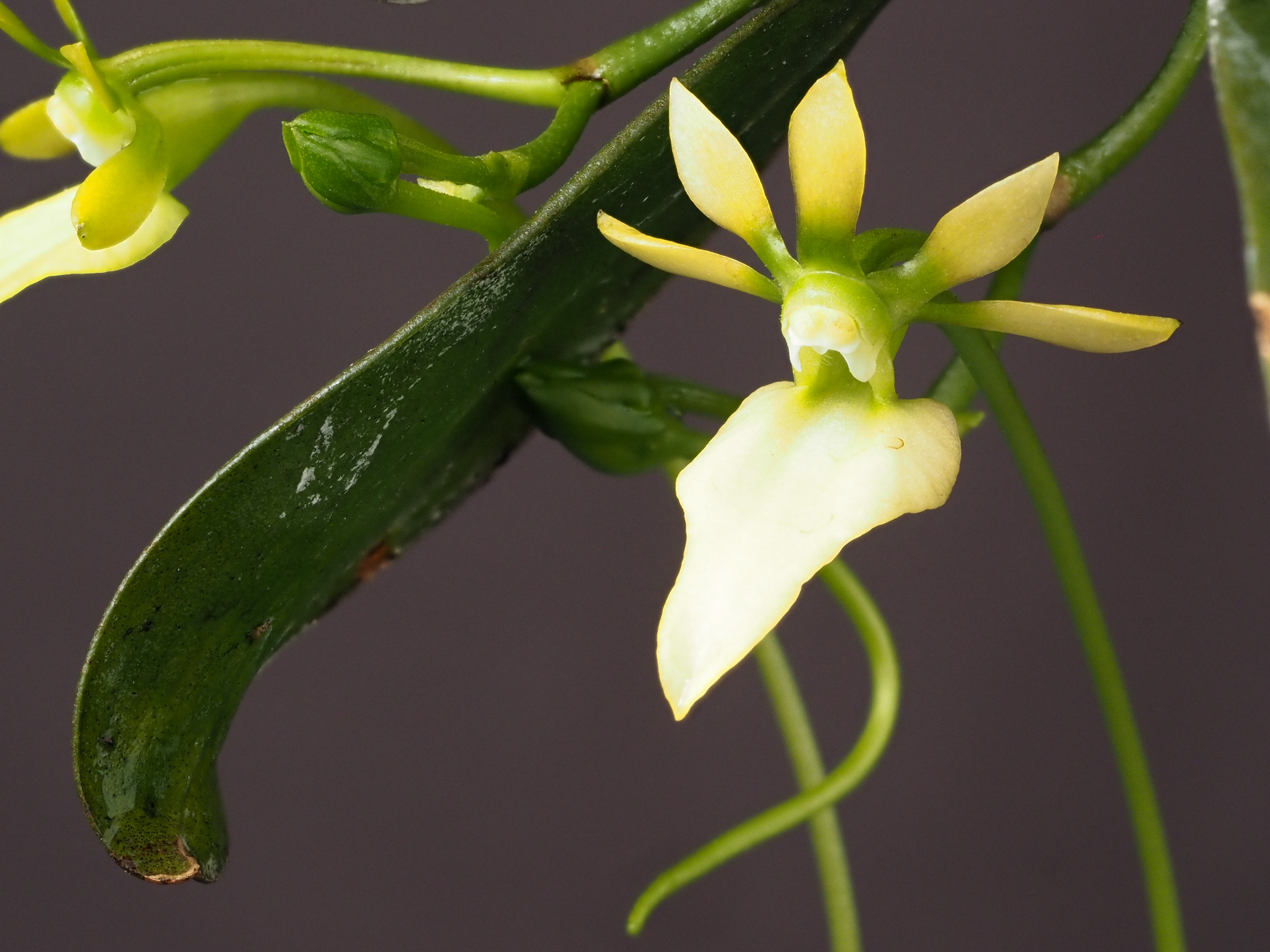

Scientific classification
- Kingdom: Plantae
- Clade: Tracheophytes
- Clade: Angiosperms
- Clade: Monocots
- Order: Asparagales
- Family: Orchidaceae
- Subfamily: Epidendroideae
- Genus: Neobathiea
- Species: N. grandidierana

Binomial name
- Neobathiea grandidierana (Rchb.f.) Garay

Synonyms
- Aeranthes grandidierana Rchb.f. (basionym); Angraecum grandidieranum (Rchb.f.) Carrière; Mystacidium grandidieranum (Rchb.f.) T. Durand & Schinz; Neobathiea filicornu Schltr.

= Neobathiea grandidierana =

Species of orchid

Neobathiea grandidierana is a species of orchid from Madagascar and the Comoros. It is named after the French naturalist Alfred Grandidier. Among the six described species of Neobathiea, this species is the most widely distributed within Madagascar, occurring in Antsiranana, Antananarivo, Fianarantsoa, and Toliara. In the Comoros, it occurs in Anjouan and Grande Comore. The habitat of this species is humid forest on west-faching slopes at the elevation range of 1000-1650m. It flowers from spring to early summer.

The long-spurred Neobathiea grandidierana from Madagascar is pollinated by a long-tongued sphinginid hawkmoth Panogena lingens with the pollinaria deposited on the basal part of the proboscis of the moth.
