= Peperomia variilimba =

Scientific classification
- Kingdom: Plantae
- Clade: Embryophytes
- Clade: Tracheophytes
- Clade: Angiosperms
- Clade: Magnoliids
- Order: Piperales
- Family: Piperaceae
- Genus: Peperomia
- Species: P. variilimba

Binomial name
- Peperomia variilimba G.Mathieu

Species of plant

Peperomia variilimba is a species of perennial herb and epiphyte from the genus 'Peperomia'. It grows in wet tropical biomes. It was discovered by Guido Mathieu in 2020. the concept of Peperomia variilimba has been confusing for almost a century due to an inaccurate description of its leaf position.

== Etymology ==
variilimba is an epithet that refers to the various leaves, as well as succulence.

== Distribution ==
Peperomia variilimba is native to Madagascar. Specimens can be found at an altitude of 1000-2000 meters. It is known in eleven locations. It is known in eleven locations.

- Madagascar
  - Alaotra-Mangoro
    - Toamasina
      - Zahamena
  - Boeny
    - Mahajanga
  - Diana
    - Antsiranana
      - Ambatohafo valley

== Description ==
It is a perennial herb and epiphyte that can be found on mossy trunks. It has a slender stem.
