= Manaratsandry (Atsinanana) =

- Location in Madagascar
- Coordinates: 19°24′0″S 48°29′00″E
- Country: Madagascar
- Region: Atsinanana
- District: Antanambao-Manampotsy (district)
- Elevation: 387 m (1,270 ft)

Population (2019)Census
  - Total: 5,833
- Time zone: UTC3 (EAT)
- postal code: 507

Manaratsandry is a rural municipality located in the Atsinanana region of eastern Madagascar, It is located in the Antanambao Manampotsy (district).
