= Manakana =

- Location in Madagascar
- Coordinates: 19°49′S 48°22′E
- Country: Madagascar
- Region: Atsinanana
- District: Antanambao Manampotsy District

Population (2019)census
  - Total: 10,437
  - Ethnicities: Betsimisaraka
- Time zone: UTC3 (EAT)
- Postal code: 507

Manakana is a rural municipality located in the Antanambao Manampotsy District, Atsinanana region of eastern Madagascar.
