= Saivaza =

- Location in Madagascar
- Coordinates: 19°40′0″S 48°32′00″E
- Country: Madagascar
- Region: Atsinanana
- District: Antanambao-Manampotsy (district)

Population (2019)Census
  - Total: 4,928
- Time zone: UTC3 (EAT)
- postal code: 507

Saivaza is a village and urban commune (municipality) located in the Atsinanana region of eastern Madagascar, It is located in the Antanambao-Manampotsy (district).
