= Antanandehibe =

- Location in Madagascar
- Coordinates: 19°41′0″S 48°20′00″E
- Country: Madagascar
- Region: Atsinanana
- District: Antanambao-Manampotsy (district)
- Elevation: 626 m (2,054 ft)

Population (2019)Census
  - Total: 10,756
- Time zone: UTC3 (EAT)
- postal code: 507

Antanandehibe is a rural municipality located in the Atsinanana region of eastern Madagascar, It is located in the Antanambao Manampotsy (district).
