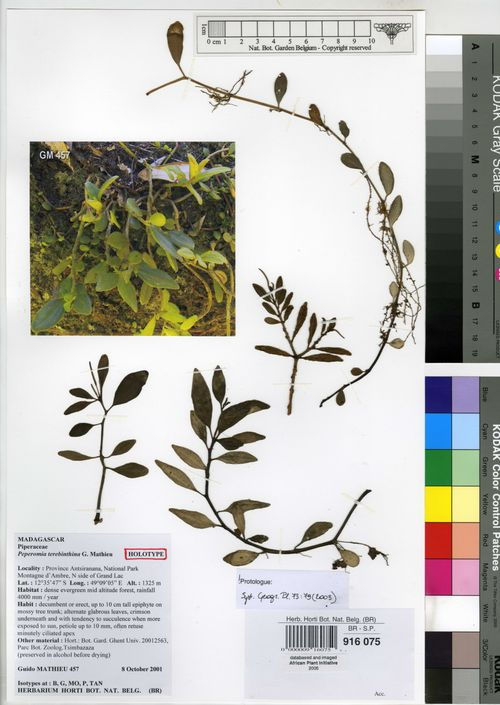

Scientific classification
- Kingdom: Plantae
- Clade: Tracheophytes
- Clade: Angiosperms
- Clade: Magnoliids
- Order: Piperales
- Family: Piperaceae
- Genus: Peperomia
- Species: P. terebinthina

Binomial name
- Peperomia terebinthina G.Mathieu

= Peperomia terebinthina =

Species of flowering plant

Peperomia terebinthina is a species of epiphyte in the genus Peperomia that is endemic in Madagascar. It primarily grows on wet tropical biomes. Its conservation status is Threatened.

== Description ==
The first specimens where collected in Antsiranana.

Peperomia terebinthina is a perennial epiphytic herb up to 20 cm tall. Its stem is mostly simple, young shoots when erect, decumbent when older, glabrous to sparingly pubescent. The leaves alternate, with its petiole being glabrous or minutely hairy. Its blade leaf is succulent, mostly glabrous though minutely pubescent at the base, near the tip and along the basal half of the midvein. The tip is ciliate, purple reddish underneath especially between veins. The blade is mostly elliptic to lanceolate and somewhat rhombic. It is 10-60 mm long and 5-40 mm wide. The tip is acute, rounded, palmately 3-veined, the midvein upside as a slight groove in the most succulent leaves, collateral veins delicate in smaller and in most succulent leaves. The inflorescences are solitary but mostly 2-3 together whilst being at the tip of most leaves. Its peduncle is glabrous or minutely pubescent, up to 10 mm long. Its rachis can reach up to 70 mm long. Its floral bracts are irregularly rounded. Fruit is not seen.

== Taxonomy and Naming ==
It was described in 2003 by G.Mathieu in Systematics and Geography of Plants, from specimens collected by Guido Mathieu. The epithet refers to the unusual taste of the leaves reminding of turpentine with a light flavor of aniseed.

== Distribution and Habitat ==
It is endemic in Madagascar. It grows on a epiphyte environment and on wet tropical biomes. It has been found at altitudes above 1000 meters. It develops a more succulent habit in more exposed locations.

== Conservation ==
This species is assessed as Threatened, in a preliminary report.
