= Peperomia tanalensis =

Scientific classification
- Kingdom: Plantae
- Clade: Tracheophytes
- Clade: Angiosperms
- Clade: Magnoliids
- Order: Piperales
- Family: Piperaceae
- Genus: Peperomia
- Species: P. tanalensis

Binomial name
- Peperomia tanalensis Baker

Species of flowering plant

Peperomia tanalensis is a species of flowering plant in the genus Peperomia. It was first described by John Gilbert Baker and published in the book "Journal of Botany, British and Foreign 20: 244. 1882". It primarily grows on wet tropical biomes. The species name came from Tanala, where first specimens of this species were collected.

== Distribution ==
It is endemic to Madagascar. First specimens where found Fianarantsoa, Tanala.

== Description ==
It is upright, pilose, heavily branched, densely tufted, and has approximately one foot tall stems. The leaves are ternate, shortly petioled, oblong, acute, entire, approximately 1 inch long. The leaves are densely pilose, with a pronounced midrib and two faint side veins that run from the base to the margin a short distance from the tip of the leaf. They are also opposite or at the tip of the branchlets. The copius spikes that are slender, terminal, shortly peduncled; rachis glabrous; peltate bracts, glabrous, lower distant, upper contiguous. Glabrous ovary with a sessile stigma at the end.
