= Ambatoboeny =

Town in Boeny Region, Madagascar

Coordinates: 16°27′16″S 46°42′58″E

Ambatoboeny, Mahajanga
- town
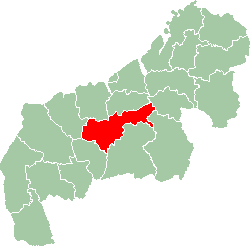
- Map of Mahajanga showing the location of Ambatoboeny
- Country: Madagascar
- Region: Boeny
- District: Ambato-Boeni

Ambatoboeny is a town in north-western Madagascar in Boeny Region. The town "faces significant health challenges due to widespread poverty, poor access to healthcare, and limited diagnostic capabilities."
