= Iakora =

- Location in Madagascar
- Coordinates: 23°06′S 46°39′E
- Country: Madagascar
- Region: Ihorombe
- District: Iakora

Population (2018)
  - Total: 14,547
- Time zone: UTC3 (EAT)
- Postal code: 311

Iakora is a small rural municipality in the southern hills of Ihorombe Region in central Madagascar.

== Geography ==
It is approximately 45 kilometres from Betroka and 140 km from Ihosy.

It is situated on the river with the same name: Iakora river. In 2021 a military base was inaugurated in this municipality.
