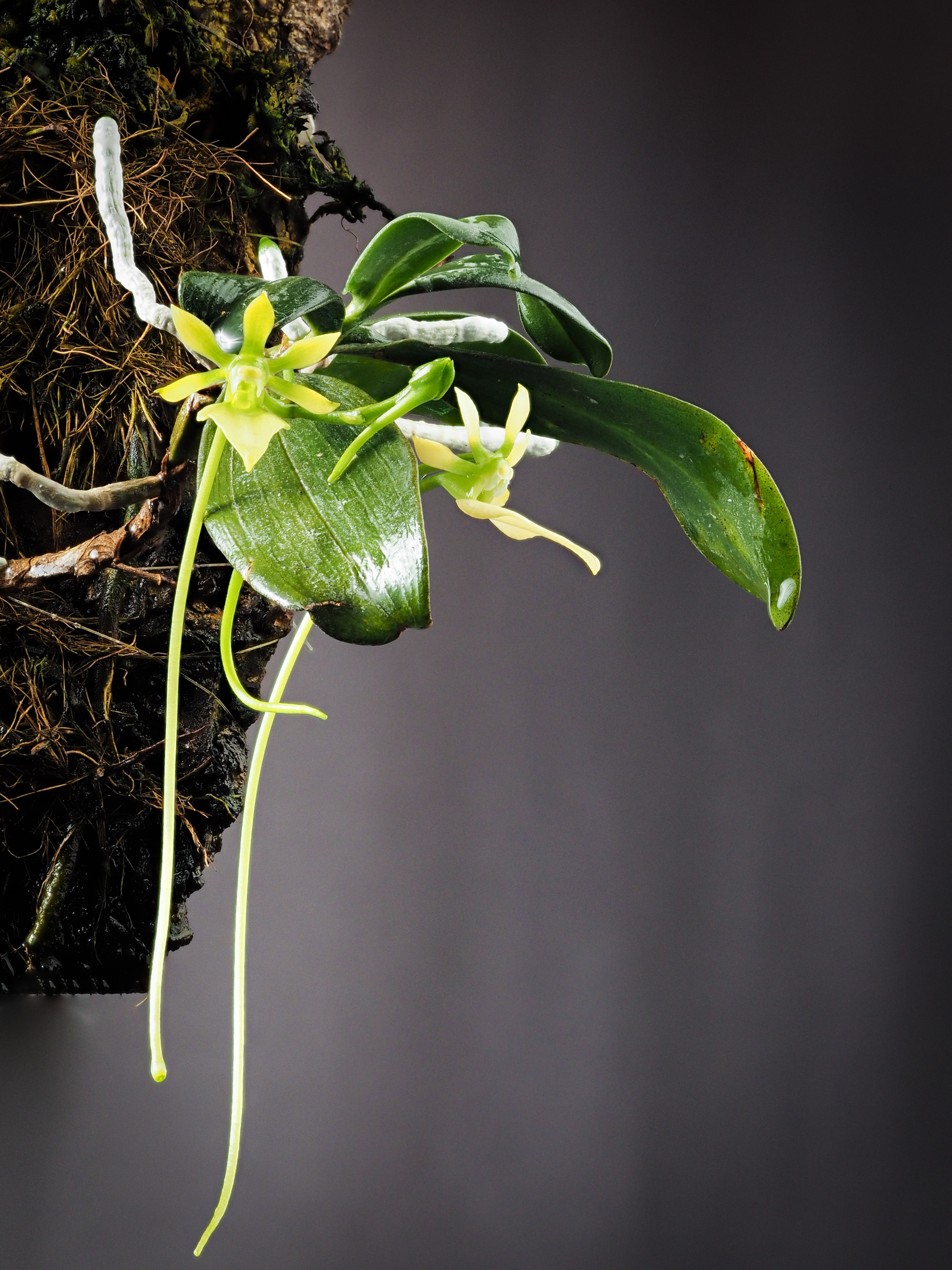

Scientific classification
- Kingdom: Plantae
- Clade: Tracheophytes
- Clade: Angiosperms
- Clade: Monocots
- Order: Asparagales
- Family: Orchidaceae
- Subfamily: Epidendroideae
- Tribe: Vandeae
- Subtribe: Angraecinae
- Genus: Neobathiea; Schltr. 1925

Species
- Neobathiea comet-halei; Neobathiea grandidierana; Neobathiea hirtula; Neobathiea keraudrenae; Neobathiea perrieri; Neobathiea spatulata

Synonyms
- Bathiea Schltr.

= Neobathiea =

Genus of orchids

Neobathiea, abbreviated as Nbth in the horticultural trade, is a genus of orchids (family Orchidaceae), native to tropical moist broadleaf forests of Madagascar and the Comoro Islands. The genus is named for the French botanist Henri Perrier de la Bâthie.

The species include small, monopodial epiphytes, with relatively large white, green, or green-and-white flowers with a long spur at the base of the lip.

== Pollination ==
Pollination occurs through hawkmoths. The separation of species is upheld by flower constancy of pollinators.

== Synonyms ==
- Neobathiea filicornu Schltr is a synonym of Neobathiea grandidierana (Rchb.f.) Garay
- Neobathiea gracilis Schltr and Neobathiea sambiranoensis Schltr are synonyms of Aeranthes schlechteri Bosser.
