= Ampampamena Airport =

Airport in Madagascar

- IATA: IVA; ICAO: FMNZ

Summary
- Airport type: Public
- Serves: Ambanja
- Location: Ampampamena
- Elevation AMSL: 49 ft / 15 m
- Coordinates: 13°29′06″S 48°37′58″E

Map
- Location of the airport in Madagascar

Runways
Direction	Length		Surface
Direction	ft	m	Surface
15/33	4,450	1,356	Asphalt
- Sources: World Aero Data

Ampampamena Airport (IATA: IVA, ICAO: FMNZ) is an airport serving Ambanja, Madagascar.

== See also ==
- List of airports in Madagascar
