= Alakamisy, Fianarantsoa =

- Location in Madagascar
- Coordinates: 20°12′0″S 47°19′0″E
- Country: Madagascar
- Province: Fianarantsoa Province

Alakamisy is a town in Fianarantsoa Province in central Madagascar.

== Geography ==
Nearby towns include Ambohimirana, Andoharano, Andranoraikitra, Antsahamalaza, Fandrianakely, Morarano, Tsarazaza and Vohibolo.

== Economy ==
There is a mine in the vicinity of the town named the Alakamisy Itenina Mine. The mine is worked in alluvium and was discovered in 1989 in a rice plantation.
