= Antanambao Manampotsy =

- Location in Madagascar
- Coordinates: 19°29′6″S 48°34′26″E
- Country: Madagascar
- Region: Atsinanana
- District: Antanambao-Manampotsy (district)
- Time zone: UTC3 (EAT)
- Postal code: 507

Antanambao Manampotsy is a village and urban commune (municipality) located in the Atsinanana region of eastern Madagascar, and is the chief town of the Antanambao Manampotsy District.

== Roads ==
Although being linked by the unpaved National Road T 20 this district remains difficult to access. It takes 7 hours by 4x4 cars for the distance of 45 km to the National road 11a.

== River ==
Antanambao Manampotsy lies at the Manampotsy river.
