= Ambenja =

- Location in Madagascar
- Coordinates: 15°17′0″S 46°58′0″E
- Country: Madagascar
- Region: Boeny

Ambenja (/ˈɑːmbɛbndʒə/) is a coastal town in the Boeny Region of northwestern Madagascar. It is located near the Mozambique Channel and is approximately 70 kilometers north of Mahajanga.
