= Anjoaty =

Ethnic group in Madagascar

Regions with significant populations
- Madagascar

Languages
- Anjoaty

Religion
- Traditional beliefs Christianity; Islam

Related ethnic groups
- Antemoro, Antalaotra

The Anjoaty sometimes called Iharanians or Onjatsy are an ethnic group of Madagascar living exclusively in the Vohémar District of the Sava Region in northeastern Madagascar. Their name means people of the river mouths.

== Recognition ==
Like Vezo and Sahafatra, the Anjoaty are not officially recognized among the 18 major ethnic groups of Madagascar, but locally they are acknowledged as a distinct people. They are sometimes grouped with neighboring groups such as the Antakarana or Betsimisaraka, though they maintain unique traditions.

== History ==
The Anjoaty claim Arab ancestry, asserting descent from settlers who arrived via Malindi and the Comoros. Some traditions say they descend from a mermaid. Historically, archaeological finds in Vohémar, including jewelry and artifacts from Persia and China, reflect a Muslim-influenced population engaged in extensive trade. Among these are a 12th-century gold piece and a reproduction of a Fatimid caliph’s coin from the 10th century. Chinese porcelain found in the area dates mainly from the 17th century.

The nearby city of Iharana (now Vohémar) contained ruins of buildings observed in the 18th century, attesting to an established settlement. Historical accounts suggest Arabs from Malindi founded Bimaro (a local port) and were familiar with other East African ports in the 16th century. However, anthropological studies suggest that the population identified as Arabs were likely East Africans, and the claim of Arab ancestry is contested.

Anthropological studies show that the Anjoaty are a mixed population of Asian and African descent, with physical features more closely resembling East African groups such as the Antalaotra, or balanced features like other Malagasy peoples. Some individuals display rarer Asian traits similar to those found among the Merina, who themselves have mixed Asian and African ancestry but with a stronger Asian influence. This suggests that the region may have been a probable entry point for Merina ancestors moving inland.

Despite lacking noble castes or sacred books, the Anjoaty are known locally as exorcists and diviners. Some reside at the mouth of the Matitana River, reportedly before the arrival of the Antemoro people. The Anjoaty were vassals of the Antakarana kingdom and one of their Chief and priestess called Maribe supported the Sakalava queen Tsiomeko in her struggle against Merina kingdom.

== Culture ==
Tradition attributes the Anjoaty with supernatural abilities, such as making coconuts fall by gesture or carrying water in woven baskets. In 1877, missionary B.T. Bachelor visited northern Madagascar and described the Onjatsy as a respected priestly caste believed to bless or curse through ritual acts. The name Onjatsy is said to mean saint. They also practiced strict endogamy, traditionally marrying only within their own lineage. They speak a northern Malagasy dialect similar to Antakarana dialect and Northern Betsimisaraka.
