= Provinces of Madagascar =

Historical administrative divisions of Madagascar

Madagascar is formally divided into six autonomous provinces (Malagasy: faritany mizakatena):

1. Antananarivo Province
2. Antsiranana Province
3. Fianarantsoa Province
4. Mahajanga Province
5. Toamasina Province
6. Toliara Province

The provinces were dissolved following the regional subdivision and the constitutional referendum of 2007. A time frame of thirty months (until October 2009) was allowed for the transition. But in the 2010 constitution, six autonomous provinces were listed. They perform no administrative function in practice and are only relevant in certain circumstances, including serving as electoral districts for the Senate.

== History ==
The provinces were created in 1946, when Madagascar was a French colony. There were originally five, while the sixth (Diego Suarez/Antsiranana) was created later, but before the provincial elections in 1957. The same provinces continued to exist after the independence in 1960.

The new constitution of 1992 stated that the country should be divided into decentralised territorial entities, without going into detail. By law of 1994, three entity levels were defined: regions, departments and communes. The provinces were not mentioned in the law.

After former president Didier Ratsiraka re-election in 1997, he introduced in 1998 a revised constitution in which the still existing provinces were transformed to "autonomous provinces". Before that, no constitution had stated any details about the subdivisions of the country, leaving it to be ruled by law. The autonomous provinces were created in 2000. The official motivation was to make Madagascar a decentralised federal state. Critics say that the hidden motivation was to make sure that Ratsiraka had a solid support from most of the provinces; his party AREMA won the provincial elections 2000 in all provinces except Antananarivo.

With the presidential elections of 2001, in which opposition candidate Ravalomanana claimed that the official figures were fraudulent, the five AREMA provincial governors came out in support of Ratsiraka and even declared themselves independent from the republic.

When Ravalomanana had secured the position as president of the republic, the provincial governors were replaced with PDS'es (Presidents by special delegation), who are still in place. This effectively put an end to the "autonomous provinces", although they nominally remain in place because they are included in the constitution.

Rumours about the dissolution of the autonomous provinces had been around for some time, when on 4 April 2007 a constitutional referendum was held, in which the majority of the voters backed a revised constitution without any provinces. The new regions will become the highest level of subdivision.

The years after independence 1960, Madagascar had a French-inspired division system.

During the second republic (1975–1991), Madagascar was divided into four levels of government:

1. Faritany (province)
2. Fivondronana (or fivondronampokontany)
3. Firaisana (or firaisampokontany)
4. Fokonolona (or fokontany)

Today, there are five different levels of division:

1. Faritany mizakatena (autonomous province) (6)
2. Faritra (region) (22)
3. Fivondronana (district) (116)
4. Kaominina (commune) (1,548)
5. Fokontany (16,969)

The constitution of 1992 ruled that the country should be decentralized into territorial entities. The name, number, and limits of territorial entities should be determined by law. The law passed by the national assembly in 1994 defined three such entity levels: region (faritra), department (departemanta) and commune (kaominina). The communes were created in 1996. The existing provinces were not mentioned in the law.

With former president Didier Ratsiraka back in power, the constitution was amended in 1998, to include and specifically mention six autonomous provinces, divided into undefined regions and communes. The autonomous provinces, having the same names and territories as the already existing provinces, were created in 2000. Elections for the six provincial councils were held on 3 December 2000, resulting in an AREMA majority in all provinces except Antananarivo.

During the power struggle after the presidential elections in 2001, five of those provinces, whose governors supported Ratsiraka, declared themselves independent from the republic. The new president, Ravalomanana, replaced the provincial governments by special delegations, appointed by the president. This effectively means that the autonomous provinces have ceased to exist as such, and their dissolution is planned (see below).

In 2004, the regions were finally created by the national assembly in law number 2004-001. Meanwhile, the 28 regions originally proposed had become 22. Although they are subdivisions of the provinces, they are representatives (and representing the people) of the republic, not the province. The regions will also take over the assets of the "ex-Fivondronampokontany". It is also mentioned that the communes are the only entities that are operational, and there will be an unspecified period of transition to the new system. The departments are not mentioned in the law, instead the designation "components" of the regions is used.

Also in 2004, the already existing Fokontany were redefined in the presidential decree 2004–299. They are subdivisions of the communes and headed by a chief designated by the mayor.

In 2005, a new entity called "districts" (distrika) was created by presidential decree 2005–012, replacing the department level of 1994. There are 116 districts. They have the same boundaries as the old "Sous-préfectures" or "ex-Fivondronampokontany". They are defined as subdivisions of the regions, and contains one or more "Arrondissements Administratifs". The chief of a district is designated by the chief of the region.

In the 2007 Constitution the autonomous provinces have been removed. Instead, the regions, the communes and the fokontany (but not the districts) are included. However, in the 2010 constitution, six autonomous provinces were re-listed.

== See also ==
- Ranked list of Malagasy provinces
- ISO 3166-2:MG
- Subdivisions of Madagascar
- Regions of Madagascar
- Districts of Madagascar
- List of cities in Madagascar
