= Antanambao Manampotsy District =

Antanambao Manampotsy
- Location in Madagascar
- Coordinates: 19°29′6″S 48°34′26″E
- Country: Madagascar
- Region: Atsinanana
- District: Antanambao-Manampotsy (district)

Population (2020)
  - Total: 64,402
- Time zone: UTC3 (EAT)
- code postal: 507

Antanambao Manampotsy is a district located in the Atsinanana Region of eastern Madagascar.

== Communes ==
The district is further divided into five communes:

- Antanambao Manampotsy
- Antanandehibe
- Mahela
- Manakana
- Saivaza

== Roads ==
The district is crossed by the unpaved National Road T 20. It takes 7 hours by 4x4 cars for the distance of 45 km to the National road 11a.

== Rivers ==
- the Manampotsy River
