= Districts of Madagascar =

Districts of Madagascar

Districts are second-level administrative divisions of Madagascar below the regions. There are 114 districts in Madagascar. Districts are themselves divided into communes; while some of the districts in urban areas (such as the City districts of Antananarivo, Antsirabe I, Antsiranana I, Fianarantsoa I, Toamasina I and Toliara I) and offshore islands (such as the districts of Nosy Be and Nosy Boraha) each consist of only one commune, most of the districts are divided typically into 5–20 communes.

== List of districts ==
District	Region	Former province	Area in km^{2}	Population estimate mid 2013	Population Census 2018	Population density per km^{2} (2018)
Ambalavao	Haute Matsiatra	Fianarantsoa	4,798.47	209,417	300,242	62.6
Ambanja	Diana	Antsiranana	5,999.72	190,435	238,114	39.7
Ambato-Boeni	Boeny	Mahajanga	8,528.25	211,204	264,141	31.0
Ambatofinandrahana	Amoron'i Mania	Fianarantsoa	10,321.48	155,470	215,851	20.9
Ambatolampy	Vakinankaratra	Antananarivo	1,651.14	256,164	282,970	171.4
Ambatomainty	Melaky	Mahajanga	4,740.44	29,420	43,305	9.1
Ambatondrazaka	Alaotra-Mangoro	Toamasina	5,540.25	324,610	359,614	64.9
Ambilobe	Diana	Antsiranana	8,006.76	216,145	280,089	35.0
Amboasary-Atsimo	Anosy	Toliara	9,888.82	209,090	256,977	26.0
Ambohidratrimo	Analamanga	Antananarivo	1,432.36	399,037	441,682	308.4
Ambohimahasoa	Haute Matsiatra	Fianarantsoa	1,929.12	214,703	272,123	141.1
Ambositra	Amoron'i Mania	Fianarantsoa	2,914.18	262,353	296,485	101.7
Ambovombe-Androy	Androy	Toliara	6,504.18	349,675	362,309	55.7
Ampanihy	Atsimo-Andrefana	Toliara	13,837.11	310,173	398,374	28.8
Amparafaravola	Alaotra-Mangoro	Toamasina	4,622.51	267,622	323,935	70.1
Analalava	Sofia	Mahajanga	8,732.19	148,668	163,968	18.8
Andapa	Sava	Antsiranana	4,051.48	189,882	219,397	54.2
Andilamena	Alaotra-Mangoro	Toamasina	7,686.18	70,527	105,187	13.7
Andramasina	Analamanga	Antananarivo	1,406.41	170,124	168,161	119.6
Anjozorobe	Analamanga	Antananarivo	4,275.06	177,134	225,792	52.8
Ankazoabo-Atsimo	Atsimo-Andrefana	Toliara	7,456.28	65,560	71,393	9.6
Ankazobe	Analamanga	Antananarivo	7,358.26	151,543	195,418	26.6
Anosibe-An'ala	Alaotra-Mangoro	Toamasina	2,858.75	89,205	113,904	39.8
Antalaha	Sava	Antsiranana	6,795.01	231,479	268,902	39.6
Antanambao-Manampotsy	Atsinanana	Toamasina	1,298.55	48,665	61,845	47.6
Antananarivo-Atsimondrano	Analamanga	Antananarivo	421.97	585,184	642,364	1,522.3
Antananarivo-Avaradrano	Analamanga	Antananarivo	581.88	362,539	449,425	772.4
Antananarivo-Renivohitra	Analamanga	Antananarivo	85.01	1,299,080	1,275,207	15,000.7
Antanifotsy	Vakinankaratra	Antananarivo	2,785.57	307,944	352,407	126.5
Antsalova	Melaky	Mahajanga	6,864.38	58,341	57,662	8.4
Antsirabe I	Vakinankaratra	Antananarivo	132.94	238,478	245,592	1,847.4
Antsirabe II	Vakinankaratra	Antananarivo	2,471.31	406,353	446,688	180.7
Antsiranana I (Diego-Suarez)	Diana	Antsiranana	71.90	115,015	131,165	1,824.3
Antsiranana II	Diana	Antsiranana	5,612.41	105,416	130,903	23.3
Antsohihy	Sofia	Mahajanga	4,773.81	137,433	175,855	36.8
Arivonimamo	Itasy	Antananarivo	2,135.48	304,931	354,097	165.8
Bealanana	Sofia	Mahajanga	6,831.86	143,005	183,889	26.9
Befandriana Avaratra (North Befandriana)	Sofia	Mahajanga	8,718.98	241,082	256,588	29.4
Befotaka	Atsimo-Atsinanana	Fianarantsoa	3,238.05	53,456	54,028	16.7
Bekily	Androy	Toliara	5,141.49	164,751	236,715	46.0
Beloha	Androy	Toliara	4,787.01	109,361	154,652	32.3
Belon'i Tsiribihina	Menabe	Toliara	8,037.88	124,136	132,141	16.4
Benenitra	Atsimo-Andrefana	Toliara	4,368.05	38,716	43,808	10.0
Beroroha	Atsimo-Andrefana	Toliara	7,320.22	45,709	68,795	9.4
Besalampy	Melaky	Mahajanga	11,951.49	71,195	58,916	4.9
Betafo	Vakinankaratra	Antananarivo	4,155.03	254,736	319,057	76.8
Betioky-Atsimo	Atsimo-Andrefana	Toliara	7,690.61	205,332	308,774	40.1
Betroka	Anosy	Toliara	13,672.48	190,836	210,854	15.4
Boriziny-Vaovao (formerly Port Bergé)	Sofia	Mahajanga	7,088.30	189,097	228,972	32.3
Fandriana	Amoron'i Mania	Fianarantsoa	2,274.51	201,611	215,961	94.9
Farafangana	Atsimo-Atsinanana	Fianarantsoa	2,824.05	341,843	400,174	141.7
Faratsiho	Vakinankaratra	Antananarivo	1,856.87	193,301	220,900	119.0
Fenoarivo-Afovoany	Bongolava	Antananarivo	7,553.98	130,443	181,284	24.0
Fenoarivo-Atsinanana (Fenerive Est)	Analanjirofo	Toamasina	2,992.86	308,395	294,036	98.2
Fianarantsoa I	Haute Matsiatra	Fianarantsoa	86.05	190,318	189,879	2,206.6
Iakora	Ihorombe	Fianarantsoa	4,556.49	50,409	55,899	12.3
Ifanadiana	Vatovavy	Fianarantsoa	3,970.73	154,272	175,111	44.1
Ihosy	Ihorombe	Fianarantsoa	17,191.45	203,373	293,129	17.1
Ikalamavony	Haute Matsiatra	Fianarantsoa	9,796.82	89,374	125,651	12.8
Ikongo (Fort Canot)	Fitovinany	Fianarantsoa	3,154.42	186,055	202,827	64.3
Isandra	Haute Matsiatra	Fianarantsoa	1,342.89	129,461	151,039	112.5
Ivohibe	Ihorombe	Fianarantsoa	4,315.09	58,525	69,492	16.1
Kandreho	Betsiboka	Mahajanga	6,101.87	20,690	25,892	4.2
Lalangina	Haute Matsiatra	Fianarantsoa	1,051.31	169,568	183,586	174.6
Maevatanana	Betsiboka	Mahajanga	10,749.93	151,001	223,794	20.8
Mahabo	Menabe	Toliara	13,716.13	141,538	154,017	11.2
Mahajanga I	Boeny	Mahajanga	51.05	220,629	244,722	4,793.8
Mahajanga II	Boeny	Mahajanga	4,687.22	77,524	95,192	20.3
Mahanoro	Atsinanana	Toamasina	3,763.09	238,467	284,812	75.7
Maintirano	Melaky	Mahajanga	9,888.01	106,604	115,192	11.6
Mampikony	Sofia	Mahajanga	4,572.27	133,765	185,637	40.6
Manakara-Atsimo	Fitovinany	Fianarantsoa	3,162.57	365,427	380,538	120.3
Mananara Avaratra (North Mananara)	Ambatosoa	Toamasina	4,486.59	169,942	240,352	53.6
Manandriana	Amoron'i Mania	Fianarantsoa	981.98	95,594	105,622	107.6
Mananjary	Vatovavy	Fianarantsoa	5,467.09	316,930	278,736	51.0
Mandoto	Vakinankaratra	Antananarivo	4,846.01	146,330	206,744	42.7
Mandritsara	Sofia	Mahajanga	10,297.26	253,985	305,318	29.7
Manja	Menabe	Toliara	9,072.62	75,175	106,378	11.7
Manjakandriana	Analamanga	Antananarivo	1,798.82	204,153	220,079	122.3
Maroantsetra	Ambatosoa	Toamasina	6,964.52	220,973	251,878	36.2
Marolambo	Atsinanana	Toamasina	3,580.68	149,556	167,224	46.7
Marovoay	Boeny	Mahajanga	5,611.56	182,742	198,670	35.4
Miandrivazo	Menabe	Toliara	12,329.89	130,790	157,013	12.7
Miarinarivo	Itasy	Antananarivo	2,579.39	240,687	293,318	113.7
Midongy-Atsimo	Atsimo-Atsinanana	Fianarantsoa	2,546.86	45,817	47,746	18.7
Mitsinjo	Boeny	Mahajanga	4,664.40	59,578	86,719	18.6
Morafenobe	Melaky	Mahajanga	7,414.22	24,035	34,730	4.7
Moramanga	Alaotra-Mangoro	Toamasina	7,149.48	275,146	352,874	49.4
Morombe	Atsimo-Andrefana	Toliara	7,783.86	117,175	218,190	28.0
Morondava	Menabe	Toliara	5,690.69	120,473	151,028	26.5
Nosy Be	Diana	Antsiranana	320.02	73,010	109,465	342.1
Nosy Boraha (formerly Sainte Marie)	Analanjirofo	Toamasina	185.22	26,547	26,457	142.8
Nosy Varika	Vatovavy	Fianarantsoa	3,828.08	241,438	254,735	66.5
Sakaraha	Atsimo-Andrefana	Toliara	8,578.10	113,080	150,508	17.5
Sambava	Sava	Antsiranana	4,681.76	304,366	395,680	84.5
Soalala	Boeny	Mahajanga	7,725.38	47,997	41,727	5.4
Soanierana-Ivongo	Analanjirofo	Toamasina	4,365.01	136,054	143,365	32.8
Soavinandriana	Itasy	Antananarivo	1,869.86	187,217	250,547	134.0
Taolagnaro (Fort-Dauphin)	Anosy	Toliara	5,950.37	271,878	341,482	57.4
Toamasina I (Tamatave)	Atsinanana	Toamasina	30.91	274,667	326,286	10,556.0
Toamasina II Tamatave II	Atsinanana	Toamasina	5,011.89	231,367	261,516	52.2
Toliara I (Tulear)	Atsimo-Andrefana	Toliara	32.12	156,710	169,760	5,285.2
Toliara II	Atsimo-Andrefana	Toliara	9,617.76	264,301	369,485	38.4
Tsaratanana	Betsiboka	Mahajanga	12,138.71	121,831	144,875	11.9
Tsihombe	Androy	Toliara	2,528.71	110,147	149,700	59.2
Tsiroanomandidy	Bongolava	Antananarivo	10,558.50	326,925	493,190	46.7
Vangaindrano	Atsimo-Atsinanana	Fianarantsoa	4,816.70	329,596	355,329	73.8
Vatomandry	Atsinanana	Toamasina	2,281.26	139,906	170,148	74.6
Vavatenina	Analanjirofo	Toamasina	2,670.79	173,222	196,257	73.5
Vohemar	Sava	Antsiranana	8,268.55	255,080	239,034	28.9
Vohibinany (Brickaville)	Atsinanana	Toamasina	6,056.85	188,052	212,572	35.1
Vohibato	Haute Matsiatra	Fianarantsoa	1,828.93	196,343	224,776	122.9
Vohipeno	Fitovinany	Fianarantsoa	1,150.76	152,337	143,935	125.1
Vondrozo	Atsimo-Atsinanana	Fianarantsoa	3,199.72	127,990	163,397	51.1

- Note that Isandra, Lalangina and Vohibato Districts previously formed Fianarantsoa II District (within Haute Matsiatra Region) which has now been split into these three new districts. Another new district was formed by splitting off the new Mandoto District from Betafo District (within Vakinankaratra Region).

== See also ==
- Subdivisions of Madagascar
- Provinces of Madagascar
- Regions of Madagascar
- List of cities in Madagascar
