= 2007 Malagasy constitutional referendum =

Constitutional referendum

- 4 April 2007
- Do you accept this draft revision of the Constitution for rapid and sustainable development by region, in order to improve the standard of living of Malagasy people?

Results
Choice	Votes	%
Yes	2,378,650	75.33%
No	779,092	24.67%
Valid votes	3,157,742	97.94%
Invalid or blank votes	66,346	2.06%
Total votes	3,224,088	100.00%
Registered voters/turnout	7,381,091	43.68%

A constitutional referendum was held in Madagascar on 4 April 2007. The proposed changes, which voters were asked to approve or reject as a whole, included:

- expansion of presidential powers in cases of emergency
- abolition of the six autonomous provinces in favor of 22 smaller areas (faritra or regions), a change that is intended to facilitate regional development
- adoption of English as an official language (in addition to the two existing official languages, French and Malagasy)
- removal of the phrase "secular state" (French: état laïque) from the Constitution

Early results, with 73.18% of the vote counted, showed that turnout was around 42.43%. The referendum appeared likely to be passed because 74.93% of the voters in Antananarivo were in favour of the amendments, even though it seemed likely that in four of the five other provinces the "no" vote might have won. According to results released on 7 April, with votes from 85.47% of polling stations counted, 75.24% were in favor of the proposed changes. Roland Ratsiraka, who placed third in the 2006 presidential election and opposed the proposed changes, alleged fraud.

Official results were released on 11 April, but it was necessary for the Constitutional High Court to validate the results in order for them to be final, and this happened on 27 April.

The Judged By Your Work Party (AVI) chose to boycott the referendum, saying that it was deceitful for the referendum to describe a "yes" vote as being a vote for national development.

== Results ==
Choice	Votes	%
For	2,378,650	75.33
Against	779,092	24.67
Total	3,157,742	100.00
Valid votes	3,157,742	97.94
Invalid/blank votes	66,346	2.06
Total votes	3,224,088	100.00
Registered voters/turnout	7,381,091	43.68
Source: HCC
