= Toamasina Province =

Toamasina
- province
- Map of Madagascar with Toamasina highlighted
- Coordinates (Capital): 17°45′S 48°45′E
- Country: Madagascar
- Capital: Toamasina

Area
  - Total: 71,911 km^{2} (27,765 sq mi)

Population (2004)
  - Total: 2,855,600
  - Density: 39.710/km^{2} (102.85/sq mi)
- Time zone: UTC+3

The Toamasina Province is a former province of Madagascar with an area of 71,911 km^{2}. It had a population of 2,855,600 (2004). Its capital was Toamasina, the most important seaport of the country. The province was also known as Tamatave Province.

Except for Toliara, Toamasina Province bordered all of the country's other provinces; Antsiranana in the north, Mahajanga in the northwest, Antananarivo in the southwest and Fianarantsoa in the south. Northern Betsimisaraka Malagasy and Southern Betsimisaraka Malagasy languages were widely spoken.

Despite the production of exportable crops the people inhabiting the rural regions of the province were mostly poor. In terms of rural poverty the province was only better than the Toliara province. In urban areas the condition was comparatively better and the percentage of people living below the poverty line was the least in the whole of Madagascar. The country's largest harbour–Toamasina Harbour was located in the province. Vanilla farming was also an important activity.

In 2002 a state of emergency was declared by the then president Didier Ratsiraka after his rival Marc Ravalomanana announced that he had won the majority in the presidential elections held in December 2001. Major politicians of the provinces favouring Ratsiraka as the president met in Toamasina where they announced the creation of a new republic that would have excluded the landlocked Antananarivo Province. Toamasina favoured Ratsiraka as the president. Political tension prompted ethnic clashes and in the coastal provinces the Merina people were subject to attacks. Murders of people belonging to the Merina community were also reported. Peace was restored only when Ravalomanana was installed the country's president and Ratsiraka left the country.

Lake Rasoabe and Ranomainty were located in the province. The coastal areas of the province were covered with dense rain forests and the province had a rich variety of flora and fauna. Lemurs were also found.

== Abolition ==
The provinces were abolished following the results of Malagasy constitutional referendum, 2007 which led to the formation of 22 smaller areas (faritra or regions) to facilitate regional development.

== Administrative divisions ==
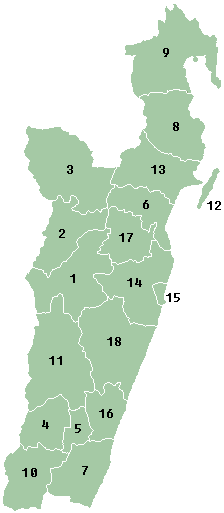

Toamasina Province was divided into three regions of Madagascar - Alaotra-Mangoro, Analanjirofo and Atsinanana. These three regions became the first-level administrative divisions when the provinces were abolished in 2009. They are sub-divided into 18 districts:

- Alaotra-Mangoro region
  - 1. Ambatondrazaka District (Ambatondrazaka)
  - 2. Amparafaravola District (Amparafaravola)
  - 3. Andilamena District (Andilamena)
  - 4. Anosibe An'ala District (Anosibe An'ala)
  - 11. Moramanga District (Moramanga)
- Analanjirofo region
  - 6. Fenerive Est District (Fenerive Est, Fenoarivo Atsinanana)
  - 8. Mananara Nord District (Mananara Nord, Mananara Avaratra)
  - 9. Maroantsetra District (Maroantsetra)
  - 12. Nosy-Boraha District (Nosy-Boraha, Île Sainte-Marie)
  - 13. Soanierana Ivongo District (Soanierana Ivongo)
  - 17. Vavatenina District (Vavatenina)
- Atsinanana region
  - 5. Antanambao Manampotsy District (Antanambao Manampotsy)
  - 7. Mahanoro District (Mahanoro)
  - 10. Marolambo District (Marolambo)
  - 14. Toamasina II District (Toamasina II)
  - 15. Toamasina District (Toamasina)
  - 16. Vatomandry District (Vatomandry)
  - 18. Vohibinany District (Vohibinany, Ampasimanolotra, Brickaville)

== See also ==
- Île aux Nattes
