= Mahajanga Province =

Mahajanga
- province
- Map of Madagascar with Mahajanga highlighted
- Coordinates (Capital): 16°45′S 46°15′E
- Country: Madagascar
- Capital: Mahajanga

Area
  - Total: 150,023 km^{2} (57,924 sq mi)

Population (2004)
  - Total: 1,896,000
  - Density: 12.64/km^{2} (32.73/sq mi)
- Time zone: UTC+3

Mahajanga was a former province of Madagascar that had an area of 150,023 km^{2}. It had a population of 1,896,000 (2004). Its capital was Mahajanga, the second largest city in Madagascar.

Except for Fianarantsoa, Mahajanga Province bordered all of the country's other provinces–Antsiranana in the north, Toamasina in the east, Antananarivo in the southeast and Toliara in the southwest. Sea cucumbers were an important commercial product produced in the province.

In 1999, cholera epidemic broke out in the province. It infected 380 people and claimed 26 lives. The epidemic spread towards the southern Antananarivo and Toliara provinces. The province was hit by Cyclone Kamisy in June 1984. A large percentage of the province's population lived below the poverty line.

A large area of the province was covered by rain forests. It had a rich variety of flora and fauna. Several lemur species were endemic to the province. Assassin spiders were discovered in the province's Baie de Baly National Park. Another important national park is Ankarafantsika National Park. The national parks attract many tourists and served as an important economic advantage to the province. A Natural Science Center was created in Mahajanga in 1985.

Rice, cotton, tobacco and manioc were the important agricultural products. The province offered limited opportunities for higher and technical education. The health related facilities are limited. Anemia in children was common and the province offered poor transportation and security related facilities.

== Abolition ==
The provinces were abolished following the results of Malagasy constitutional referendum, 2007 which led to the formation of 23 smaller areas (faritra or regions) to facilitate regional development.

== Administrative divisions ==
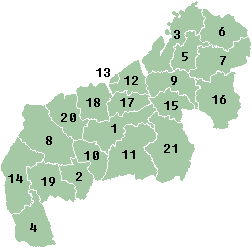

Mahajanga Province was divided into four regions - Betsiboka, Boeny, Melaky and Sofia. These four regions became the first-level administrative divisions when the provinces were abolished in 2009. They are subdivided into 21 districts:

- Betsiboka region:
  - 10. Kandreho District
  - 11. Maevatanana District
  - 21. Tsaratanana District
- Boeny region:
  - 1. Ambato-Boeni District
  - 12. Mahajanga II District
  - 13. Mahajanga
  - 17. Marovoay District
  - 18. Mitsinjo District
  - 20. Soalala District
- Melaky region:
  - 2. Ambatomainty District
  - 4. Antsalova District
  - 8. Besalampy District
  - 14. Maintirano District
  - 19. Morafenobe District
- Sofia region:
  - 3. Analalava District
  - 5. Antsohihy District
  - 6. Bealanana District
  - 7. Befandriana-Nord District
  - 9. Boriziny District
  - 15. Mampikony District
  - 16. Mandritsara District

== Bibliography ==
- Bradt, Hilary (2011). Madagascar. Bradt Travel Guides. ISBN 978-1-84162-341-2.
- International Monetary Fund (2003). Madagascar: Poverty Reduction Strategy Paper. International Monetary Fund. GGKEY:WBCZZ86945A.
- Kohn, George C. (2008). Encyclopedia of Plague and Pestilence: From Ancient Times to the Present. Infobase Publishing. ISBN 978-1-4381-2923-5.
- Lovatelli, Alessandro; Conand, C. (2004). Advances in Sea Cucumber Aquaculture and Management. Food & Agriculture Org. p. 142. ISBN 978-92-5-105163-4.
- Rafalimanana, Hantamalala (1998). Short Birth Intervals, Correlated Mortality Risks, and Early Childhood Mortality in Madagascar. University of Wisconsin--Madison.
- Proceedings and Final Report of the International Seminar on the Improvement of Housing Conditions and the Rehabilitation of Historic Centres: 10-22 September 1990, IAA "Santo Kiriko" Creativity Centre, Assenovgrad, Bulgaria. UN-HABITAT. 1991. ISBN 978-92-1-131136-5.
- Wheeler, Quentin; Pennak, Sara (2013). What on Earth?: 100 of Our Planet's Most Amazing New Species. Penguin Group US. ISBN 978-0-698-14832-1.
- Wilson, Don E.; Reeder, DeeAnn M. (2005). Mammal Species of the World: A Taxonomic and Geographic Reference. JHU Press. ISBN 978-0-8018-8221-0.
- The Private Sector and Development: Five Case Studies. World Bank Publications. 1997. ISBN 978-0-8213-3889-6.
- Health, Nutrition, and Population in Madagascar, 2000-09. World Bank Publications. 2011. ISBN 978-0-8213-8538-8.
- Education and Training in Madagascar: Toward a Policy Agenda for Economic Growth and Poverty Reduction. World Bank Publications. 2002. ISBN 978-0-8213-5164-2.
- Primate Conservation: The Newsletter and Journal of the IUCN/SSC Primate Specialist Group. World Wildlife Fund and the Department of Anatomical Sciences, State University of New York at Stony Brook. 1988.
