= Antananarivo Province =

Antananarivo
- province
- Map of Madagascar with Antananarivo highlighted
- Coordinates: 18°45′S 46°45′E
- Country: Madagascar
- Capital: Antananarivo

Area
  - Total: 58,283 km^{2} (22,503 sq mi)

Population (2004)
  - Total: 5,370,900
  - Density: 92.152/km^{2} (238.67/sq mi)
- ISO 3166 code: MG-T
- Website: www.gov-antananarivo.mg

Antananarivo Province is a former province of Madagascar with an area of 58,283 square kilometres (22,503 mi^{2}). It had a population of 5,370,900 in 2004. Its capital was Antananarivo, which is also the capital of the country. Established in 1965, it was the most important province of Madagascar in terms of industrial production. It was one of the most literate provinces and was dominated by the Merina people. Along with the other five provinces, it was abolished in 2007 after a referendum in favour of creation of smaller regions to help in development was approved. It was badly affected by plagues in the 20th century. In 2002 a state of emergency was proclaimed by the then president Didier Ratsiraka. The events that followed led to the other five provinces announcing the creation of a new republic that would have excluded Antananarivo Province. Peace was restored only when Marc Ravalomanana was installed as the country's president.

== History and location ==
The province was administered by a provincial council whose members were elected by the local citizens for a term of five years. The council consisted of a governor and 12 general commissioners at maximum. The province used to be the most literate one in Madagascar and offered the most employment opportunities. As of 1997, only 34% of the population was illiterate and about 30% of the inhabitants had received education up to secondary level. In the same year about 42% of the country's total civil servants were working in the province and two-thirds of the province's inhabitants were above the poverty line. This was due to the presence of the country's capital in the province . The province was located on a plateau generally called "The Blue Forest". It was the most important political and commercial centre in Madagascar. The French colonial authority had established the province in 1946. During 1993 to 2001 the rate of people below poverty line in the province decreased steadily from 63.4% in 1993 to 61.8% in 1997, then to 57.1% in 1999 and finally 48.3% in 2001. In 1993 only Mahajanga Province was better in terms of percentage of poor population at 47.9%. In all the later surveys Antananarivo Province emerged as the best in terms of people above poverty. Around 30% of the Madagascar's total population lived in the province. In 2003 a research paper titled Madagascar: Poverty Reduction Strategy Paper and published by the International Monetary Fund revealed that about 92% of the province's households had access to potable water. Since it lies in Southern Hemisphere the province experiences winter season from April to October and humid summers during the rest of the year.

Except for Antsiranana Province, Antananarivo Province bordered all of the country's other provinces. It was surrounded by Mahajanga Province in the north, Toamasina Province in the east, Fianarantsoa Province in the south and Toliara Province in the west. Antananarivo was the only landlocked province of Madagascar. Several plagues have affected the province. It was badly affected by plagues in 1924–25 and 1933–37. The earlier one caused 650 deaths in the entire province. A cholera epidemic in 1999–2000 which broke out in Mahajanga province also affected Antananarivo province. A malaria epidemic in 1987–88 claimed several lives in the capital.

== Political instability ==
This is the home province of the noted politicians Didier Ratsiraka, Norbert Ratsirahonana and Marc Ravalomanana. Ravalomanana was born in the village of Imerinkasinina, in Manjakandriana District of the province. Before becoming the country's president, he had served as the mayor of Antananarivo. The province was dominated in population by the Merina, the island's largest and most politically prominent ethnic group. In 2002 a state of emergency was proclaimed by the then president Didier Ratsiraka after Marc Ravalomanana announced that he had won a majority in the presidential election held in December 2001. However, the initial results of the election suggested that a second round was necessary. This led to severe political tension and public protests. The provinces supporting the presidency of Ratsiraka announced the creation of a new republic which excluded Antananarivo Province. In coastal areas the Merina people were subject to ethnic violence. Ratsiraka left the country and fled to France once the news of plans to assassinate him surfaced. In April 2002, the High Constitutional Court of Madagascar declared Ravalomanana the winner. Following the announcement he was appointed as the country's president. and peace was restored within the country.

== Abolition ==
The President (PDS – Président de la Délégation Spéciale) of the province was Emile Rakotomalala. The provinces were abolished following the results of Malagasy constitutional referendum, 2007 which led to the formation of 22 smaller areas (faritra or regions) to facilitate regional development.

== Administrative divisions ==
Antananarivo Province was divided into four regions of Madagascar - Analamanga, Bongolava, Itasy and Vakinankaratra. These four regions became the first-level administrative divisions when the provinces were abolished in 2009. They are sub-divided into 20 districts:

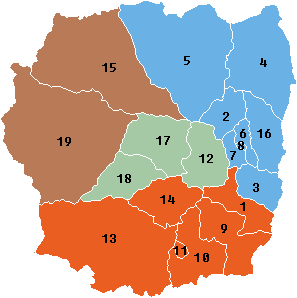

- Analamanga region (blue):
  - 2. Ambohidratrimo
  - 3. Andramasina
  - 4. Anjozorobe
  - 5. Ankazobe
  - 6. Antananarivo-Atsimondrano
  - 7. Antananarivo-Avaradrano
  - 8. Antananarivo-Renivohitra
  - 16. Manjakandriana
- Bongolava region (brown):
  - 15. Fenoarivobe
  - 19. Tsiroanomandidy
- Itasy region (green):
  - 12. Arivonimamo
  - 17. Miarinarivo
  - 18. Soavinandriana
- Vakinankaratra region (orange):
  - 1. Ambatolampy
  - 9. Antanifotsy
  - 10. Antsirabe Rural
  - 11. Antsirabe Urban
  - 13. Betafo
  - 14. Faratsiho
  - 20. Mandoto

== Towns ==
- Antananarivo
- Antsirabe
- Tsiroanomandidy
- Miarinarivo

== Bibliography ==
- Taylor & Francis Group (2004). Europa World Year. Vol. II. Taylor & Francis. ISBN 978-1-85743-255-8.
- Pryor, Frederic L. (1990). Malaŵi and Madagascar. Oxford University Press. p. 393. ISBN 978-0-19-520823-8.
- Deschamps, Hubert Jules (1965). Histoire de Madagascar (in French). Ann Arbor, MI: Berger-Levrault.
- International Monetary Fund (2003). Madagascar: Poverty Reduction Strategy Paper. International Monetary Fund. GGKEY:WBCZZ86945A.
- Goswami, D. Yogi; Zhao, Yuwen (2009). Proceedings of ISES World Congress 2007 (Vol.1–5): Solar Energy and Human Settlement. Springer Science & Business Media. ISBN 978-3-540-75997-3.
- Nielssen, Hilde (2011). Ritual Imagination: A Study of Tromba Possession Among the Betsimisaraka in Eastern Madagascar. BRILL. ISBN 978-90-04-21524-5.
- VillalÃ3n, Leonardo A.; VonDoepp, Peter (2005). The Fate of Africa's Democratic Experiments: Elites and Institutions. Indiana University Press. ISBN 0-253-00311-3.
- Madagascar & Comoros. Lonely Planet. 2008. ISBN 978-1-74104-608-3.
- International Monetary Fund (1997). Madagascar - Recent Economic Developments and Selected Issues (EPub). International Monetary Fund. ISBN 978-1-4527-6154-1.
- Appiah, Kwame Anthony; Gates, Jr. Henry Louis (2005). Africana: The Encyclopedia of the African and African American Experience. Oxford University Press. ISBN 978-0-19-517055-9.
- Kohn, George C. (2008). Encyclopedia of Plague and Pestilence: From Ancient Times to the Present. Infobase Publishing. ISBN 978-1-4381-2923-5.
