= Toliara Province =

Toliara
- Province
- Map of Madagascar with Toliara highlighted
- Coordinates (Capital): 22°45′S 44°15′E
- Country: Madagascar
- Capital: Toliara

Area
  - Total: 161,405 km^{2} (62,319 sq mi)

Population (2001)
  - Total: 2,229,550
  - Density: 13.8134/km^{2} (35.7765/sq mi)
- Time zone: UTC+3

The Toliara Province (formerly Toliary or Tuléar) is a former province of Madagascar with an area of 161,405 square kilometres (62,319 sq mi). It had a population of 2,229,550 (July, 2001). Its capital was Toliara. Near Toliara was the "spiny forest". Toliara Province bordered the following provinces – Mahajanga Province in the north, Antananarivo Province in the northeast and Fianarantsoa Province in the east.

== Economy and population ==
Masikoro Malagasy and Tandroy Malagasy were the chief languages. Sea cucumbers were exported from the province and were an important factor in its economy. The deciduous Andronovory forest was located in the province.

The province was the poorest one in Madagascar. In 1993, 8 in every 10 person of the province was living below the poverty line. Despite the production of export crops the province recorded the highest rural poverty. The average fertility rate per woman was above 5. With 77 percent of its population being illiterate, Tolaira was the most illiterate province of Madagascar. Only 22 percent of the province's population had received primary level education.

The commercially valuable softwood tree Givotia madagascariensis, found in Antananarivo and Toliara provinces was endemic to Madagascar. The oil producing plant moringa drouhardii was endemic to Toliara province. Deforestation was a major issue for the province. In April 1971, a peasant rebellion was organised by MONIMA leader Monja Joana. The peasants refused to pay taxes and the government retaliated by dissolving MONIMA and deporting Joana.

Toliara province offered poor transport and security facilities. Potable water was accessible to only 24.9% of the province's households. It was rich in terms of minerals. Toliara province was in the news in July 2005 for its mining activity.

== Abolition ==
The provinces were abolished following the results of Malagasy constitutional referendum, 2007 which led to the formation of 22 smaller areas (faritra or regions) to facilitate regional development.

== Administrative divisions ==
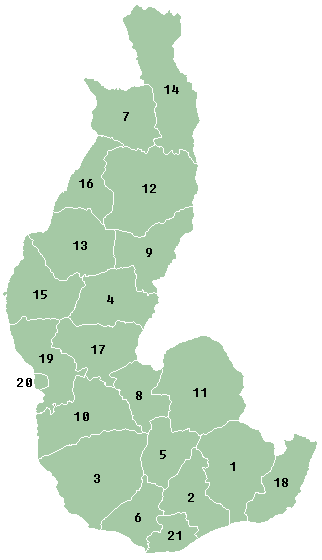

Toliara Province was divided into four regions of Madagascar - Androy, Anosy, Atsimo Andrefana and Menabe. These four regions became the first-level administrative divisions when the provinces were abolished in 2009. They are sub-divided into 21 districts:

- Androy region:
  - Ambovombe-Androy
  - Bekily
  - Beloha
  - Tsiombe
- Anosy region:
  - Amboasary Sud
  - Betroka
  - Taolanaro
- Atsimo-Andrefana region:
  - Ampanihy Ouest
  - Ankazoabo
  - Benenitra
  - Beroroha
  - Betioky-Atsimo
  - Morombe
  - Sakaraha
  - Toliara II
  - Toliara
- Menabe region:
  - Belon'i Tsiribihina
  - Mahabo
  - Manja
  - Miandrivazo
  - Morondava

== Bibliography ==
- Collins, N. Mark; Morris, Michael G. (1985). "Papilio (Princeps) morondavana Grose-smith, 1891". Threatened Swallowtail Butterflies of the World: The IUCN Red Data Book. Gland & Cambridge: IUCN. pp. 354–355. ISBN 978-2-88032-603-6 – via Biodiversity Heritage Library.
- Cook, Jonathan A. (2010). Vulnerable Places, Vulnerable People: Trade Liberalization, Rural Poverty and the Environment. Edward Elgar Publishing. ISBN 978-1-84980-519-3.
- Europa Publications (2003). Political Chronology of Africa. Routledge. ISBN 978-1-135-35666-8.
- Frawley, William (2003). International Encyclopedia of Linguistics. Oxford University Press. p. 205. ISBN 978-0-19-513977-8.
- Madagascar: Recent Economic Developments and Selected Issues. International Monetary Fund. 1997. ISBN 978-1-4519-9201-4.
- Madagascar: Poverty Reduction Strategy Paper. International Monetary Fund. 2003. GGKEY:WBCZZ86945A.
- Lemmens, R.H.M.J.; Louppe, D.; Oteng-Amoako, A.A. Timbers 2. PROTA. ISBN 978-92-9081-495-5.
- Lovatelli, Alessandro; Conand, C. (2004). Advances in Sea Cucumber Aquaculture and Management. Food & Agriculture Org. p. 141. ISBN 978-92-5-105163-4.
- Milisenda, Claudio C.; Henn, U. (1996). "Compositional characteristics of sapphires from a new find in Madagascar". The Journal of Gemmology. 25 (3). Great Britain: Gemmological Association of Great Britain: 177–184. doi:10.15506/JoG.1996.25.3.177.
- van der Vossen, H.A.M.; Mkamilo, G.S. (2007). Vegetable oils. PROTA. ISBN 978-90-5782-191-2.
- Education and Training in Madagascar: Toward a Policy Agenda for Economic Growth and Poverty Reduction. World Bank Publications. 2002. ISBN 978-0-8213-5164-2.
