= Fianarantsoa Province =

Fianarantsoa
- province
- Map of Madagascar with Fianarantsoa highlighted
- Coordinates (Capital): 21°30′S 47°0′E
- Country: Madagascar
- Capital: Fianarantsoa

Area
  - Total: 103,272 km^{2} (39,874 sq mi)

Population (2001)
  - Total: 3,366,291
  - Density: 32.5964/km^{2} (84.4242/sq mi)
- Time zone: UTC+3

Fianarantsoa Province is a former province of Madagascar. It has an area of 103,272 km^{2} and population of 3,366,291 (July 2001 estimate). Its capital was Fianarantsoa. The province along with the 5 other was abolished in 2007 in favour of creation of smaller regions to facilitate administration.

Apart from the capital the major towns were Andohapatsakana, Alakamisy, Fianarantsoa and Fanjakana. The province was home to four major national parks: Ranomafana National Park, Midongy Du Sud, Isalo National Park, and Andringitra. It was frequently referred by its abbreviated form of "Fianar". Fianarantsoa means "Good education".

== Geography and demographics ==
Fianarantsoa Province bordered the Toamasina Province in the north, Antananarivo Province in the northwest, Toliara Province in the west and Indian Ocean in the east. 60,000 people spoke the southern Malagasy Betsimisaraka language. In spite of presence of rice producing areas a very high majority of the population lived in poverty. The province's economy suffered greatly due to environmental issues and poor agricultural practices. Around 75% of the province's population lived below the poverty line. The province recorded the highest fertility rate in Madagascar. The average fertility rate per woman was greater than 6. The combined population of the Antananarivo and Fianarantsoa was more than that of the remaining provinces. It was the stronghold of former president Marc Ravalomanana. The major ethnic groups were Betsimisaraka, Betsileo, Antaisaka and Bara. Betsimisaraka and Antaisaka inhabited the east coast of the province while Betsileo people lived in the southern parts of the province.

== Fauna ==
Several shrew species like Microgale cowani, Microgale gracilis, Microgale gymnorhyncha, Microgale longicaudata, Microgale principula, Microgale pusilla, Microgale taiva and Microgale talazaci were endemic to the province. Many snake species were also endemic to the province.

== Education ==
Illiteracy was also an important issue. In 2002 around 1200 unopened schools were located in the province. Most of them were constructed by the government. The survival rates were very low. To increase the literacy rate the government had subsidised private schools.

== Abolition ==
The province's president was Fidy Mpanjato Rakotonarivo (since 2005). The provinces were abolished following the results of Malagasy constitutional referendum, 2007 which led to the formation of 22 smaller areas (faritra or regions) to facilitate regional development.

== Administrative divisions ==
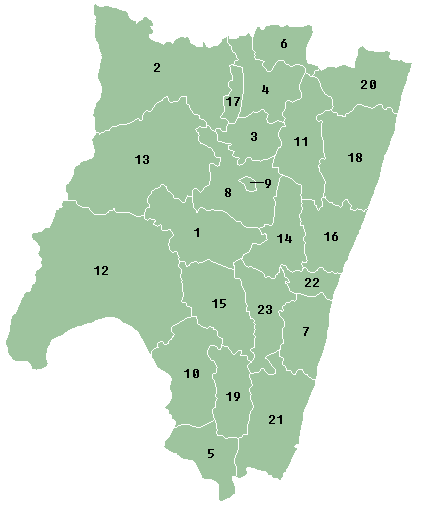

Fianarantsoa Province was divided into five regions of Madagascar - Atsimo-Atsinanana, Amoron'i Mania, Haute Matsiatra, Ihorombe and Vatovavy-Fitovinany. These five regions became the first-level administrative divisions when the provinces were abolished in 2009. They are sub-divided into 23 districts:

- Atsimo-Atsinanana region:
  - 5. Befotaka
  - 7. Farafangana
  - 19. Midongy-Sud
  - 21. Vangaindrano
  - 23. Vondrozo
- Amoron'i Mania region:
  - 2. Ambatofinandrahana
  - 4. Ambositra
  - 6. Fandriana
  - 17. Manandriana
- Haute Matsiatra region:
  - 1. Ambalavao
  - 3. Ambohimahasoa
  - 8. Fianarantsoa Rural
  - 9. Fianarantsoa Urban
  - 13. Ikalamavony
- Ihorombe region:
  - 10. Iakora District (Iakora)
  - 12. Ihosy District (Ihosy)
  - 15. Ivohibe District (Ivohibe)
- Vatovavy-Fitovinany region:
  - 11. Ifanadiana
  - 14. Ikongo
  - 16. Manakara-Atsimo
  - 18. Mananjary
  - 20. Nosy Varika
  - 22. Vohipeno
