= Regions of Madagascar =

Administrative divisions of Madagascar

Regions of Madagascar since 2023

Madagascar is divided into 24 regions (faritra). The regions are de facto first-level administrative divisions of the country, although they are formally subordinate to the six provinces.

The subdivision of Madagascar's provinces into regions dates to 2004, when 22 regions were established. In 2021, Vatovavy-Fitovinany was split into the regions of Fitovinany and Vatovavy. The law creating Ambatosoa from the northern part of Analanjirofo was enacted in 2023 and the new region was inaugurated in 2025.

The table below records the area of the regions using the current borders, along with the population within those borders as recorded in the 2018 census.

Name	Area (km^{2})	Population (2018 Census)	Population density (per km^{2})	Capital	Province
Diana	19,266	889,736	36.3	Antsiranana	Antsiranana
Sava	25,518	1,123,013	38.4	Sambava	Antsiranana
Itasy	6,993	897,962	104.8	Miarinarivo	Antananarivo
Analamanga	16,911	3,618,128	198.0	Antananarivo	Antananarivo
Vakinankaratra	16,599	2,074,358	108.6	Antsirabe	Antananarivo
Bongolava	16,688	674,474	27.4	Tsiroanomandidy	Antananarivo
Sofia	50,100	1,500,227	24.9	Antsohihy	Mahajanga
Boeny	31,046	931,171	25.8	Mahajanga	Mahajanga
Betsiboka	30,025	394,561	9.8	Maevatanana	Mahajanga
Melaky	38,852	309,805	7.5	Maintirano	Mahajanga
Alaotra-Mangoro	31,948	1,255,514	32.1	Ambatondrazaka	Toamasina
Atsinanana	21,934	1,484,403	57.9	Toamasina	Toamasina
Ambatosoa	11,196	491,077	43.9	Maroantsetra	Toamasina
Analanjirofo	11,188	659,012	58.9	Fenoarivo Atsinanana	Toamasina
Amoron'i Mania	16,141	833,919	44.3	Ambositra	Fianarantsoa
Matsiatra Ambony	21,080	1,447,296	56.9	Fianarantsoa	Fianarantsoa
Vatovavy	11,662	724,250	62.1	Mananjary	Fianarantsoa
Atsimo-Atsinanana	18,863	1,026,674	47.6	Farafangana	Fianarantsoa
Ihorombe	26,391	418,520	11.8	Ihosy	Fianarantsoa
Menabe	46,121	700,577	12.8	Morondava	Toliara
Atsimo-Andrefana	66,236	1,799,088	19.9	Toliara	Toliara
Androy	19,317	903,376	38.0	Ambovombe-Androy	Toliara
Anosy	25,731	809,313	26.1	Tôlanaro	Toliara
Fitovinany	7,943	801,504	100.9	Manakara	Fianarantsoa

== Elections ==
The last elections for the regional councils were held on 16 March 2008.

== See also ==
- Subdivisions of Madagascar
- Districts of Madagascar
- List of regions of Madagascar by Human Development Index
- List of cities in Madagascar

== Sources ==
- Population, area: Madagascar: Profil des marchés pour les évaluations d'urgence de la sécurité alimentaire. January 2006. (in French)
- Découpage Territorial - L'Express.mg (in French)
