= Antsiranana Province =

- province
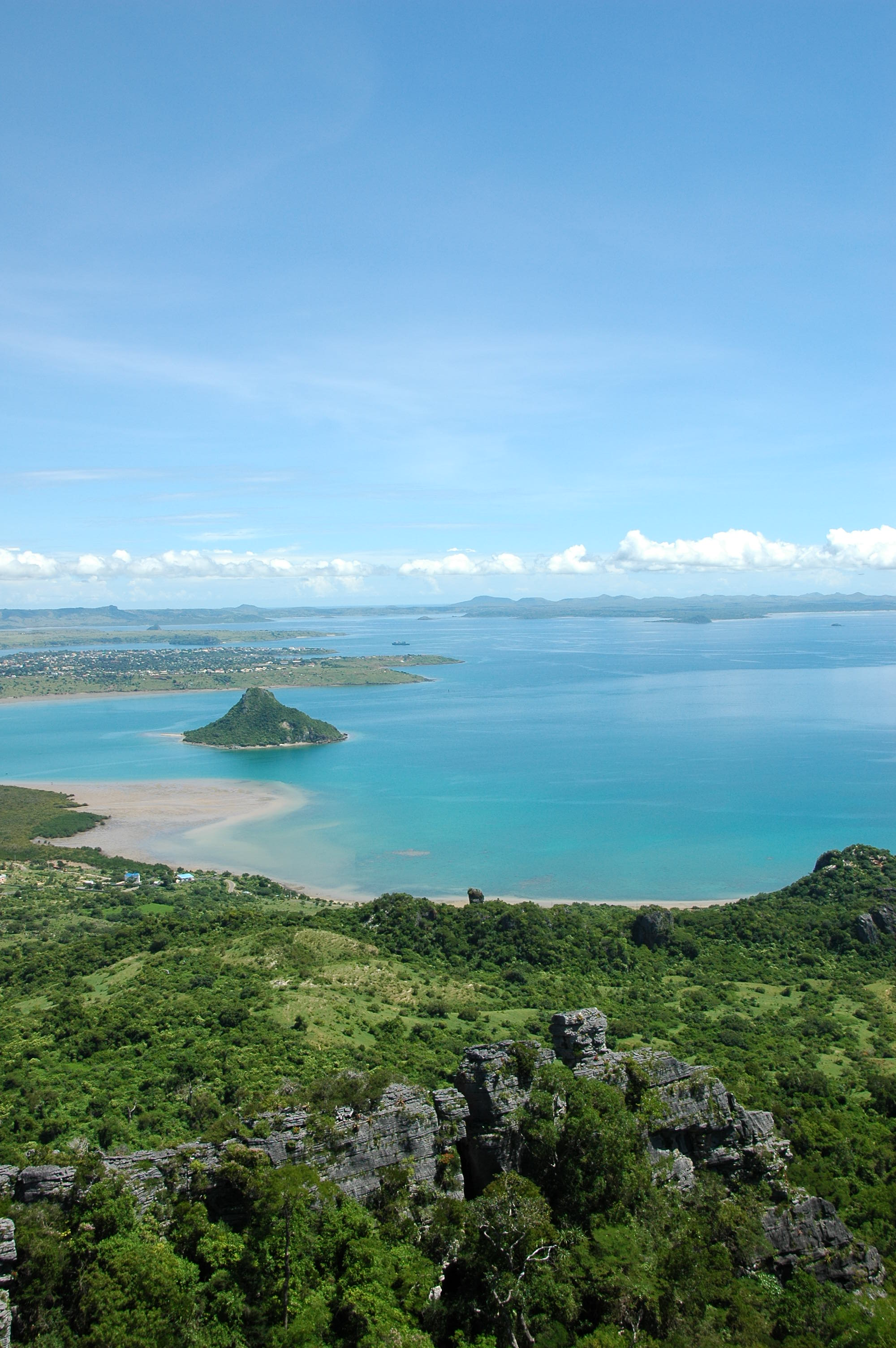
- Antsiranana Bay

- Map of Madagascar with Antsiranana highlighted
- Coordinates: 13°35′S 49°30′E
- Country: Madagascar
- Capital: Antsiranana

Area
  - Total: 43,406 km^{2} (16,759 sq mi)

Population (2001)
  - Total: 1,188,425
  - Density: 27.379/km^{2} (70.912/sq mi)
- Time zone: UTC+3

Antsiranana is a former province of Madagascar with an area of 43,406 km^{2}. It had a population of 1,188,425 (July 2001). Its capital was Antsiranana. A diversity of ethnic groups are found in the province, including Anjoaty, Sakalava, Antakarana, Tsimihety, Antemoro, Betsimisaraka, Antandroy, etc.

== History ==
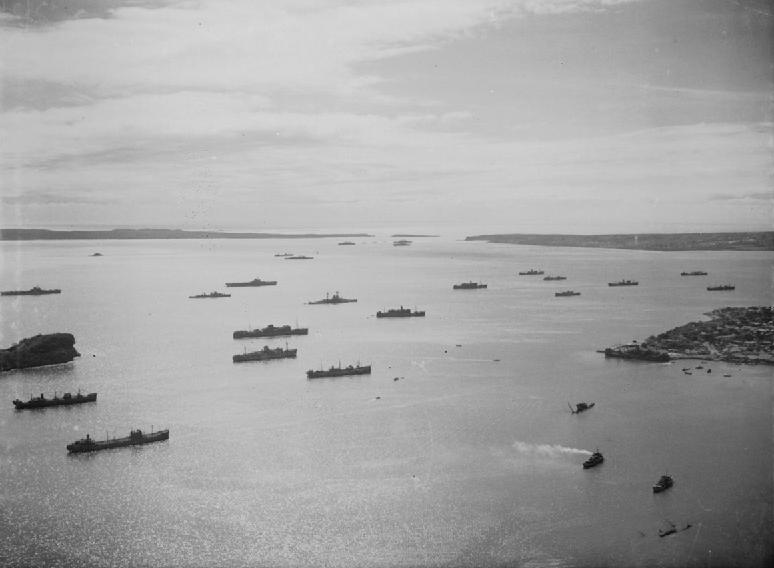
Warships and British merchant ships in the Antsiranana harbor after the French had surrendered on 13 May 1942

A major battle took place at Diego-Suárez (now Antsiranana), the largest city in Antsiranana Province, in May 1942. "Fierce fighting" in the area saw over 500 Allied casualties. On May 29, Japanese submarine I-10 surfaced off the coast and launched a Nakajima A6M2-N reconnaissance aircraft over the port. Operation Ironclad was relaunched, after being stalled, on June 22 to counterattack, with supporting forces from the East African Brigade Group and later the Rhodesian 27th Infantry Brigade in July.

== Geography ==
Antsiranana Province bordered Toamasina Province to the southeast and Mahajanga Province to the southwest. The province has been described as being "virtually isolated", because of Mt Tsaratanana, the highest peak, being situated in it at 2,800 metres (9,200 ft) above sea level. The valleys are fertile, with tropical crops cultivated. There is a natural harbour at Antsiranana which contains a significant naval base.

Ankarana Reserve, in the northwest, was established in 1956. It is a small, partially vegetated plateau composed of 150-million-year-old middle Jurassic limestone. With an average annual rainfall of about 2,000 millimetres (79 in), the underlying rocks are susceptible to erosion, thereby producing caves and underground rivers—a karst topography. The rugged relief and the dense vegetation have helped protect the region from human intrusion. The Ankarana Reserve is an important refuge for significant populations of the crowned lemur (Eulemur coronatus), Sanford's brown lemur (Eulemur sanfordi) and other mammal species. Species of Podocarpus humbertii is found in dry lowland deciduous forest, sub-humid forest, and in wooded heath on mountain summits of gneiss and granite in the province between 1600 and 2410 metres.

A large bay, known as the Bay of Antisiranana forms part of the coastline in the north. Rich in biodiversity, in recent decades it has become a hotspot for conservationists. Many species found in the Bobaomby in particular, such as the Madagascan tree boa, the Madagascan ground boa and the crowned lemur have made the IUCN Red List as endangered or vulnerable. In July 2007, the Ministry of the Environment and Forests transferred management to a local committee. The Montagne des Français forest is now also under protection.

== Administrative divisions ==
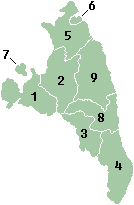

Antsiranana Province was divided into two regions - Diana and Sava. These two regions became the first-level administrative divisions when the provinces were abolished in 2009. They are subdivided into nine districts:

- Diana Region
  - 1. Ambanja District (Ambanja)
  - 2. Ambilobe District (Ambilobe)
  - 5. Antsiranana Rural
  - 6. Antsiranana
  - 7. Nosy Be District (Nosy Be)
- Sava Region
  - 3. Andapa District (Andapa)
  - 4. Antalaha District (Antalaha)
  - 8. Sambava District (Sambava)
  - 9. Vohemar District (Vohemar)

== Economy and health ==
Antsiranana Province is known for its sapphires. A number of Catholic schools set up by missionaries in the province are still scattered about.

Rural poverty is a major problem in the region, with 69.2% of the population reported to be suffering in 2001 according to reports by the International Monetary Fund. An unusual percentage of children in the province have been reported to be suffering from anemia, as high as 70% in some parts.
