= Marovoay (disambiguation) =

Marovoay may refer to several places in Madagascar:

- Marovoay, Alaotra-Mangoro - a village in Alaotra-Mangoro
- Marovoay, a town and commune in Marovoay District, Boeny Region.
- Marovoay Banlieue, a town and commune in Marovoay District, Boeny Region.
- Marovoay Sud, a town and commune in Besalampy District, Melaky Region.
- Marovoay District, a district in Boeny Region.
