= Ankaraobato (disambiguation) =

Ankaraobato is the name of several municipalities in Madagascar:

- Ankaraobato, Marovoay - a town in Boeny.
- Ankaraobato - a town in Analamanga
- a locality in Atsimo-Andrefana
