= Bemarivo (disambiguation) =

Bemarivo is the name of several municipalities and rivers in Madagascar:

- Bemarivo, a rural municipality in Melaky.
- Bemarivo Reserve - a protected area in Melaky.
- Bemarivo (Sofia), a river in the Sofia Region.
- Bemarivo River, a river in the Sava Region.

== Similar spelling ==
- Bemaharivo, a rural municipality in Boeny.
- Bemarivo Ankirondro, a rural municipality in Menabe.
