= Antanimasaka, Marovoay =

Antanimasaka
- Location in Madagascar
- Coordinates: 16°14′S 46°31′E
- Country: Madagascar
- Region: Boeny
- District: Marovoay
- foundation: October 1996

Area
  - Total: 205.31 km^{2} (79.27 sq mi)
- Elevation: 13 m (43 ft)

Population (2018)
  - Total: 23,331
  - Ethnicities density: 114/km^{2} (300/sq mi)
- Time zone: UTC3 (EAT)
- Postal code: 416

Antanimasaka is a rural municipality in Madagascar. It belongs to the district of Marovoay (33km), which is a part of Boeny Region. The population of the municipality was 23331 in 2018.

Only primary schooling is available. The majority 82% of the population of the commune are farmers, while an additional 14% receives their livelihood from raising livestock. The most important crop is rice, while other important products are peanuts and sweet potatoes. Services provide employment for 1% of the population. Additionally fishing employs 3% of the population.

== Rivers ==
Antanimasaka has a riverine harbour, it is situated on the left banks of the Betsiboka River.

== History ==
- from 1886 to 1890 : arrival of the first Sakalava populations, that had accompagnied the king Andriamadisoarivo ((1690-1712) at Antanimasaka and Maroala.
- from 1910 to 1919 : first settlers in the fokotany (village) of Beanamamy Sud and Marosakoa, principally of Betsileo and Antesaka.
- from 1946 to 1953 : the fokontany Ampijoroa, d’Antsakoamanera and Morafeno received the first populations, mainly Betsileo, Antandroy, Antesaka and Merina.

Antanimasaka was part of the municipality of Manaratsandry until 1996 when it was split off. At first it was composed by 6 fokontany (villages): Ampijoroa, Antsakoamanera, Marosakoa, Benamamy sud and Anaborano but since then another 2 fokontany were created: Morafeno and Marosakoa.
