= Berivotra (disambiguation) =

Berivotra may refer to:

- Berivotra Formation - in the municipality Antanambao Andranolava, Boeny
- Berivotra - a municipality in Betsiboka, Madagascar
