= Coua berthae =

Coua berthae Temporal range: Holocene

Scientific classification
- Domain: Eukaryota
- Kingdom: Animalia
- Phylum: Chordata
- Class: Aves
- Order: Cuculiformes
- Family: Cuculidae
- Genus: Coua
- Species: C. berthae

Binomial name
- Coua berthae Goodman & Ravoavy 1993

Extinct species of bird

Coua berthae is an extinct species of coua, a large, mostly terrestrial bird in the cuckoo family, from Madagascar. It was the largest member of its genus, living or extinct. It was named in honour of the Malagasy zoologist Berthe Rakotosamimanana.

== Discovery and naming ==
Alfred Grandidier discovered a complete tarsometatarsus at Apasambazimba as early as 1911. This bone is in the Academie Malgache and is now classified as a paratype. The holotype, a left half of the pelvis, was brought to light in 1983 in the Grotte d'Anjohibe near Andranoboka.

It is named after the Malagasy primatologist and palaeontologist, Bertha Rakotosamimanana.

== Description ==
Due to the length of the pelvis half of 68.2 millimetres (2.69 in) and the tarsometatarsus of 92.9 millimetres (3.66 in), it is assumed that Coua berthae represented the largest type of silk cuckoo. An estimated minimum weight of 740 grams (26 oz) was calculated from the comparison of the basin lengths of four recent types of silk cuckoo using linear regression. This estimated weight is twice that of Coua gigas - the largest of the living couas. Given that all silk cuckoo species have proportionally small wing bones, it has been assumed that Coua berthae was not a good flyer.

== Extinction ==
Coua berthae is known only from fossilized remains from the Holocene period; the exact time of extinction and the cause are unknown. Deforestation could have been a contributing factor to its extinction.
