= Belobaka, Mahajanga II =

Belobaka
- Location in Madagascar
- Coordinates: 15°41′S 46°25′E
- Country: Madagascar
- Region: Boeny
- District: Mahajanga II
- Elevation: 20 m (66 ft)

Population (2001)
  - Total: 12,000
- Time zone: UTC3 (EAT)
- Postal code: 402

Belobaka is a rural municipality in Madagascar. It belongs to the district of Mahajanga II, which is a part of Boeny Region. The population of the municipality was estimated to be approximately 12,000 in 2001 commune census.

Only primary schooling is available. It is also a site of industrial-scale mining. The majority 54% of the population of the commune are farmers. The most important crops are rice and cucumber, while other important agricultural products are maize, cassava and tomato. Industry and services provide employment for 18% and 5% of the population, respectively. Additionally fishing employs 23% of the population.

== Geography ==
This town is situated at a distance of 11 km from Mahajanga.

== The Caves of Belobaka ==
There are 7 caves at Belobaka were fossils of lemurs and hippopotamus were found. These are now exhibited at the Mozea Akiba, a museum of the University of Mahajanga.

== Fokontany (villages) ==
This municipality consistes of the nine fokontany (villages) of: Belobaka, Amparemahitsy, Ampazony ou Ampahazony, Ampitolova, Ankazomenavony, Antsaboaka, Antsanitia, Besely and Ladigy.

The village of Besely has the first astronomic observery in Madagascar. The asteroid 40201 Besely was therefore named after this village of the municipality.
