= Marosakoa =

- Location in Madagascar
- Coordinates: 16°14′S 46°50′E
- Country: Madagascar
- Region: Boeny
- District: Marovoay
- Elevation: 129 m (423 ft)

Population (2001)
  - Total: 10,000
- Time zone: UTC3 (EAT)

Marosakoa is a municipality in western Madagascar over the Mozambique Channel. It is approximately 35 kilometres south of Mahajanga. It belongs to the district of Marovoay, which is a part of Boeny Region. The population of the commune was estimated to be approximately 10,000 in 2001 commune census.

Only primary schooling is available. The majority 60% of the population of the commune are farmers, while an additional 34% receives their livelihood from raising livestock. The most important crop is rice, while other important products are sugarcane and cassava. Services provide employment for 1% of the population. Additionally fishing employs 5% of the population.

== Roads ==
Marosakoa is situated at the National road No. 4, south from Mahajanga.
