= Bekobay =

- Location in Madagascar
- Coordinates: 15°49′S 46°56′E
- Country: Madagascar
- Region: Boeny
- District: Mahajanga II
- Elevation: 14 m (46 ft)

Population (2001)
  - Total: 5,000
- Time zone: UTC3 (EAT)
- Climate: Aw

Bekobay is a town and commune (Malagasy: kaominina) in Madagascar. It belongs to the district of Mahajanga II, which is a part of Boeny Region. The population of the commune was estimated to be approximately 5,000 in 2001 commune census.

Only primary schooling is available. The majority 97% of the population of the commune are farmers. The most important crop is rice, while other important products are maize and cassava. Services provide employment for 3% of the population.
