= Mahajamba Usine =

- Location in Madagascar
- Coordinates: 15°42′S 47°6′E
- Country: Madagascar
- Region: Boeny
- District: Mahajanga II

Government
  - Mayor: Henri Randrianandrasana
- Elevation: 9 m (30 ft)

Population (2001)
  - Total: 14,000
- Time zone: UTC3 (EAT)
- Postal code: 402

Mahajamba Usine is a municipality in Madagascar. It belongs to the district of Mahajanga II, which is a part of Boeny Region. The population of the commune was estimated to be approximately 14,000 in 2001.

Mahajamba Usine is served by a local airport in Fenoarivo Besakoa.

Primary and junior level secondary education are available in town. The majority 80% of the population of the commune are farmers. The most important crops are rice and peanuts, while other important agricultural products are bananas and cassava. Industry and services provide employment for 7% and 2% of the population, respectively. Additionally fishing employs 11% of the population.

== Geography ==
This municipality is located on the coastline of Boeny and almost half its surface are made up by mangroves and bodies of water, including the Mahajamba river. In 1993 also the first prawn farm of Madagascar settled here, Aqualma (Aquaculture de la Mahajamba). It comes up for almost the entire budget of the municipality.
