= Tsararano, Marovoay =

Tsararano
- Location in Madagascar
- Coordinates: 16°10′S 46°40′E
- Country: Madagascar
- Region: Boeny
- District: Marovoay
- Elevation: 7 m (23 ft)

Population (2001)
  - Total: 11,000
- Time zone: UTC3 (EAT)

Tsararano is a town and commune (Malagasy: kaominina) in Madagascar. It belongs to the district of Marovoay, which is a part of Boeny Region. The population of the commune was estimated to be approximately 11,000 in 2001 commune census.

Only primary schooling is available. The majority 69% of the population of the commune are farmers, while an additional 30% receives their livelihood from raising livestock. The most important crop is rice, while other important products are wheat, maize, cassava and barley. Services provide employment for 1% of the population.
