= Boanamary =

- Location in Madagascar
- Coordinates: 15°50′S 46°19′E
- Country: Madagascar
- Region: Boeny
- District: Mahajanga II
- Elevation: 17 m (56 ft)

Population (2001)
  - Total: 10,000
- Time zone: UTC3 (EAT)
- Postal code: 402

Boanamary is a rural municipality in Madagascar. It belongs to the district of Mahajanga II, which is a part of Boeny Region. The population of the commune was estimated to be approximately 10,000 in 2001 commune census.

Boanamary has a riverine harbour. Primary and junior level secondary education are available in town. The majority 60% of the population works in fishing. 35.5% are farmers, while an additional 0.5% receives their livelihood from raising livestock. The most important crop is cassava, while other important products are maize, onions, chili pepper and tomato. Industry and services provide both employment for 2% of the population.

Boanamary is situated at 36 km South-East of Mahajanga in the estuary of the Betsiboka River. Larger surfaces of the municipality are covered by mangroves on which natural silk is won. Also mangrove wood is traded in this municipality.
