= Ankazomborona =

- Location in Madagascar
- Coordinates: 16°7′S 46°45′E
- Country: Madagascar
- Region: Boeny
- District: Marovoay

Area
  - Total: 1,950 km^{2} (750 sq mi)
- Elevation: 8 m (26 ft)

Population (2001)
  - Total: 25,000
- Time zone: UTC3 (EAT)
- Postal code: 416

Ankazomborona is a rural municipality in Madagascar. It belongs to the district of Marovoay, which is a part of Boeny Region. The population of the commune was estimated to be approximately 25,000 in 2001 commune census.

This municipality consists of 16 fokontany (villages): Ankazomborona, Madirovalo, Amboromalandikely, Madiromiongana, Ambondromamy, Mahabibo, Besaonjo, Betaramahamay, Ambonara, Morafeno Barrage, Mahatazana, Ambohimahabibo, Belinta, Antanambao-Bemikimbo, Ankazomahitsy and Beronono.

Primary and junior level secondary education are available in town. The majority 60% of the population of the commune are farmers, while an additional 30% receives their livelihood from raising livestock. The most important crop is rice, while other important products are maize and cassava. Services provide employment for 5% of the population. Additionally, fishing employs 5% of the population.

== Bodies of water ==
- Rivers: Bekarara, Maevajofo, Andranomiditra, Mahajamba, Karambo, Namboenana, Ampatika and Ambatomainty.
- Lakes : Morafeno, Ambilivily, Amboromalandy and Matsaborikisoa.
- Sea: The Baie d'Ambaro, a RAMSAR site of 54000 ha is situated in this municipality.

== Roads ==
Ankazomborona is crossed by the National road 4 (Mahajanga-Antananarivo) from North to South.

== National Parks ==
Ankazomborona is situated at 23 km from the Ankarafantsika National Park.
