= Marovoay Banlieue =

- Location in Madagascar
- Coordinates: 15°59′S 46°36′E
- Country: Madagascar
- Region: Boeny
- District: Marovoay

Area
  - Total: 412 km^{2} (159 sq mi)
- Elevation: 18 m (59 ft)

Population (2001)
  - Total: 9,000
- Time zone: UTC3 (EAT)
- Postal code: 416

Marovoay Banlieue is a rural municipality in Madagascar. It belongs to the district of Marovoay, which is a part of Boeny Region. The population of the commune was estimated to be approximately 9,000 in 2001 commune census.

Only primary schooling is available. The majority 85% of the population of the commune are farmers, while an additional 11% receives their livelihood from raising livestock. The most important crop is rice, while other important products are maize and cassava. Services provide employment for 1% of the population. Additionally fishing employs 3% of the population.

== Geography ==
This municipality is situated at 100 km from the capital Mahajanga. It covers the villages (fokontany) around Marovoay and is constituted by the villages of Ambalabongo, Ambovokatrakatraka, Ambohibary, Andakalaka, Anosikobondro, Ambanjabe, Ambatobe, Mahatsinjo, Marosakoa, Maromiandra, Miadana and Lakovola.

== Rivers ==
The Betsiboka River is the largest of this municipity and the Andranolava River.

== Roads ==
The National road 4 crosses the north of this municipality. Also the National road 8b crosses the municipality but this is in a very bad state of conservation.
