= Antseza =

- Location in Madagascar
- Coordinates: 16°13′S 45°52′E
- Country: Madagascar
- Region: Boeny
- District: Mitsinjo
- Elevation: 31 m (102 ft)

Population (2001)
  - Total: 9,000
- Time zone: UTC3 (EAT)

Antseza is a town and commune (Malagasy: kaominina) in Madagascar. It belongs to the district of Mitsinjo, which is a part of Boeny Region. The population of the commune was estimated to be approximately 9,000 in 2001 commune census.

Antseza has a riverine harbour. Only primary schooling is available. The majority 75% of the population of the commune are farmers, while an additional 5% receives their livelihood from raising livestock. The most important crops are rice and raffia palm, while other important agricultural products are bananas and cassava. Services provide employment for 1% of the population. Additionally fishing employs 19% of the population.
