= Mariarano =

- Location in Madagascar
- Coordinates: 15°29′S 46°42′E
- Country: Madagascar
- Region: Boeny
- District: Mahajanga II
- Elevation: 37 m (121 ft)

Population (2001)
  - Total: 6,000
- Time zone: UTC3 (EAT)
- Postal code: 402

Mariarano is a rural municipality in Madagascar. It belongs to the district of Mahajanga II, which is a part of Boeny Region. The population of the commune was estimated to be approximately 6,000 in the 2001 commune census.

Only primary schooling is available. The majority 50% of the population of the commune are farmers, while an additional 10% receive their livelihood from raising livestock. The most important crops are rice and sugarcane, while other important agricultural products are bananas and cassava. Services provide employment for 5% of the population. Additionally fishing employs 35% of the population.

== Geography ==
Mariarano is situated on the coast at 83 km from the town of Mahajanga. It has a coastline of 65 km from Komany to Mataibory.
