= Ambarimaninga =

- Location in Madagascar
- Coordinates: 16°30′S 46°0′E
- Country: Madagascar
- Region: Boeny
- District: Mitsinjo
- Elevation: 91 m (299 ft)

Population (2001)
  - Total: 9,000
- Time zone: UTC3 (EAT)

Ambarimaninga is a town and commune (Malagasy: kaominina) in Madagascar. It belongs to the district of Mitsinjo, which is a part of Boeny Region. The population of the commune was estimated to be approximately 9,000 in 2001 commune census.

Only primary schooling is available. The majority (90%) of the population of the commune are farmers, while an additional 8% receive their livelihood from raising livestock. The most important crops are rice and raffia palm, while other important agricultural products are sugarcane and cassava. Services provide employment for 2% of the population.
