= Manaratsandry =

- Location in Madagascar
- Coordinates: 16°11′S 46°30′E
- Country: Madagascar
- Region: Boeny
- District: Marovoay
- established: 1991

Area
  - Total: 121.34 km^{2} (46.85 sq mi)
- Elevation: 30 m (98 ft)

Population (2018)
  - Total: 31,056
  - Density: 256/km^{2} (660/sq mi)
- Time zone: UTC3 (EAT)
- Postal code: 416

Manaratsandry is a rural municipality in Madagascar. It belongs to the district of Marovoay, which is a part of Boeny Region. The population of the municipality was 31056 in 2018.

== Geography ==
It is situated on the left bank of the Betsiboka River at 51 km from Marovoay.

== Economy ==
The majority 80% of the population of the commune are farmers, while an additional 16% receives their livelihood from raising livestock. The most important crop is rice, while other important products are peanuts and maize. Industry and services provide both employment for 1% of the population. Additionally fishing employs 2% of the population.

== Schooling ==
Primary and junior level secondary education are available in town. The rate of scolarisation is low, with 34,08 % of pupils only. 4 Fokontany (villages) have no school: Ambodimanga, Tanambao, Trangabitika and Antananabo.

== Electricity ==
Manaratsandry is not connected to the JIRAMA electrical grid, but there is a private company providing electricity to them.

Manaratsandry is not connected to the electric grid.
