= Anosinalainolona =

- Location in Madagascar
- Coordinates: 16°11′S 46°38′E
- Country: Madagascar
- Region: Boeny
- District: Marovoay
- Elevation: 7 m (23 ft)

Population (2001)
  - Total: 4,000
- Time zone: UTC3 (EAT)
- Postal code: 417

Anosinalainolona is rural municipality in Madagascar. It belongs to the district of Marovoay, which is a part of Boeny Region. The population of the commune was estimated to be approximately 4,000 in 2001 commune census.

Only primary schooling is available. The majority 60% of the population of the commune are farmers, while an additional 34% receives their livelihood from raising livestock. The most important crop is rice, while other important products are peanuts and maize. Services provide employment for 1% of the population. Additionally fishing employs 5% of the population.
