= Ambolomoty =

- Location in Madagascar
- Coordinates: 16°10′S 46°42′E
- Country: Madagascar
- Region: Boeny
- District: Marovoay

Area
  - Total: 50.92 km^{2} (19.66 sq mi)
- Elevation: 11 m (36 ft)

Population (2001)
  - Total: 12,000
- Time zone: UTC3 (EAT)
- Postal code: 416

Ambolomoty is a rural municipality in Madagascar. It belongs to the district of Marovoay, which is a part of Boeny Region. It is situated at a distance of 99 km from Mahajanga at the National road 8. The population of the commune was estimated to be approximately 12,000 in 2001 commune census.

Primary and junior level secondary education are available in town. The majority 60% of the population of the commune are farmers, while an additional 38% receives their livelihood from raising livestock. The most important crop is rice, while other important products are maize and cassava. Industry and services provide both employment for 1% of the population.
