= Cyclone Hellen =

2014 South-West Indian Ocean tropical cyclone

Tropical Cyclone Hellen
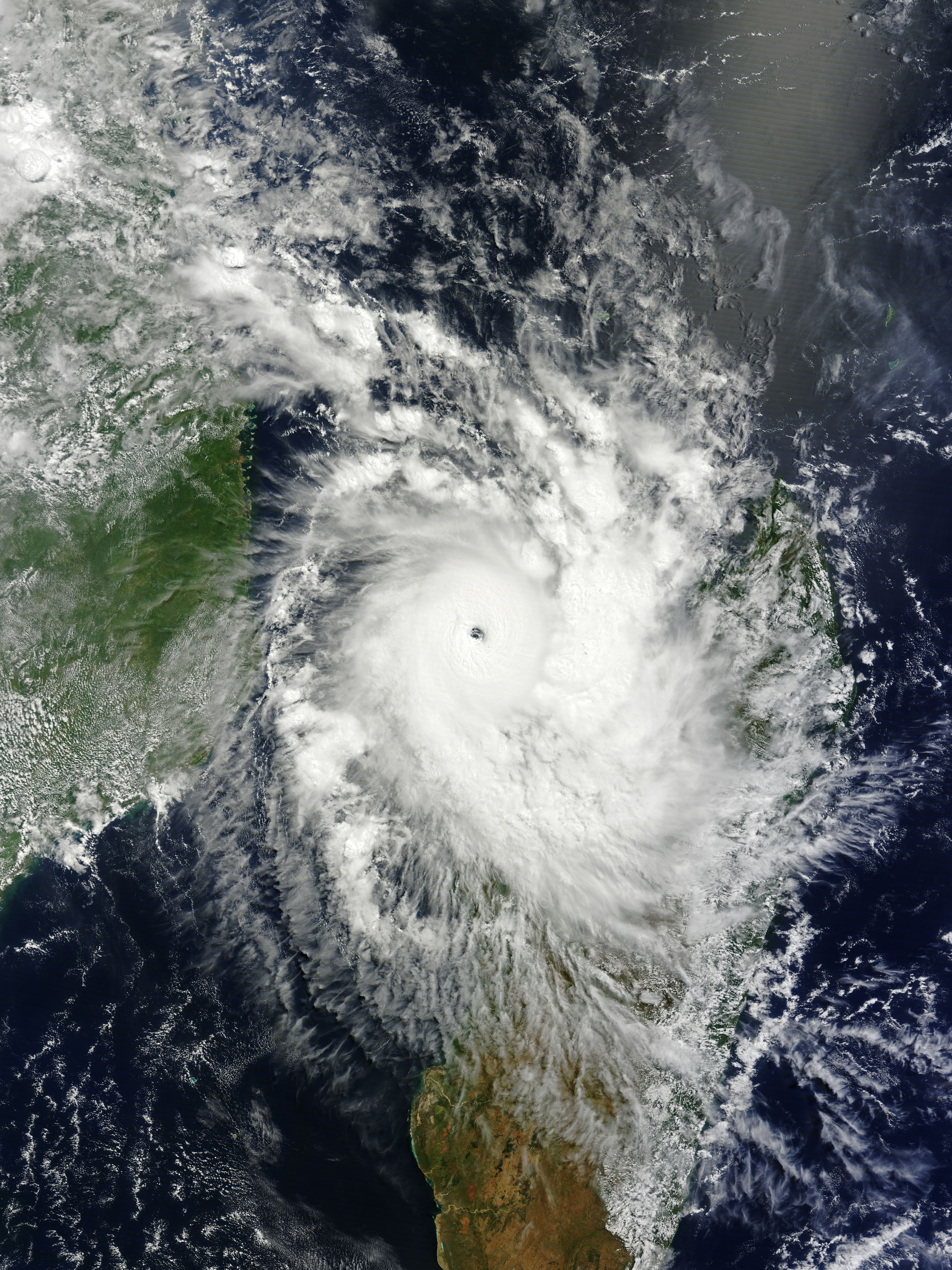
- Cyclone Hellen rapidly intensifying on March 30 over the Mozambique Channel

Meteorological history
- Formed: March 27, 2014
- Remnant low: April 1, 2014
- Dissipated: April 5, 2014

Very intense tropical cyclone
- 10-minute sustained (MF)
- Highest winds: 230 km/h (145 mph)
- Highest gusts: 325 km/h (200 mph)
- Lowest pressure: 915 hPa (mbar); 27.02 inHg

Category 4-equivalent tropical cyclone
- 1-minute sustained (SSHWS/JTWC)
- Highest winds: 240 km/h (150 mph)
- Lowest pressure: 926 hPa (mbar); 27.34 inHg

Overall effects
- Fatalities: 8
- Missing: 9
- Damage: Unknown
- Areas affected: Mozambique, Comoro Islands, Madagascar
- IBTrACS /
- Part of the 2013–14 South-West Indian Ocean cyclone season

Very Intense Tropical Cyclone Hellen of March 2014 was one of the most powerful tropical cyclones in the Mozambique Channel on record, as well as the most intense of the 2013–14 South-West Indian Ocean cyclone season. Hellen formed on March 26 in the northern portion of the channel, and the storm brought rainfall to coastal Mozambique while in its formative stages. While moving southeastward, it developed an organized area of convection over the center of circulation. Warm waters allowed Hellen to rapidly intensify while passing south of the Comoros, with a well-defined eye forming in the middle of the thunderstorms. The cyclone attained peak intensity March 30, with maximum sustained winds estimated 230 km/h (145 mph) according to the Regional Specialized Meteorological Center, Météo-France in La Réunion. Subsequently, Hellen weakened quickly due to dry air and land interaction with Madagascar, and the storm's eye dissipated. On March 31, the storm made landfall in northwestern Madagascar as a weakened cyclone, despite previous forecasts for the center to remain over water. By April 1, Hellen was no longer a tropical cyclone after most of the convection dissipated. The remnants turned to the west, moving over Mozambique without redeveloping, later dissipating on April 5.

Early in its existence, Hellen's rainfall in Mozambique destroyed hundreds of houses and a bridge. Flooding killed four people in the country, three of whom due to a home collapsing. Later, the cyclone passed south of the Comoros islands, causing flooding due to high storm surge and waves that killed one person. The storm forced 8,956 people to evacuate their homes due to the threat for landslides, while 901 houses were damaged or destroyed. On nearby Mayotte, high rainfall flooded rivers, sweeping one car away. In northwestern Madagascar, Hellen damaged or destroyed 611 houses, leaving 1,736 people homeless. The storm killed three people after capsizing a boat.

== Meteorological history ==
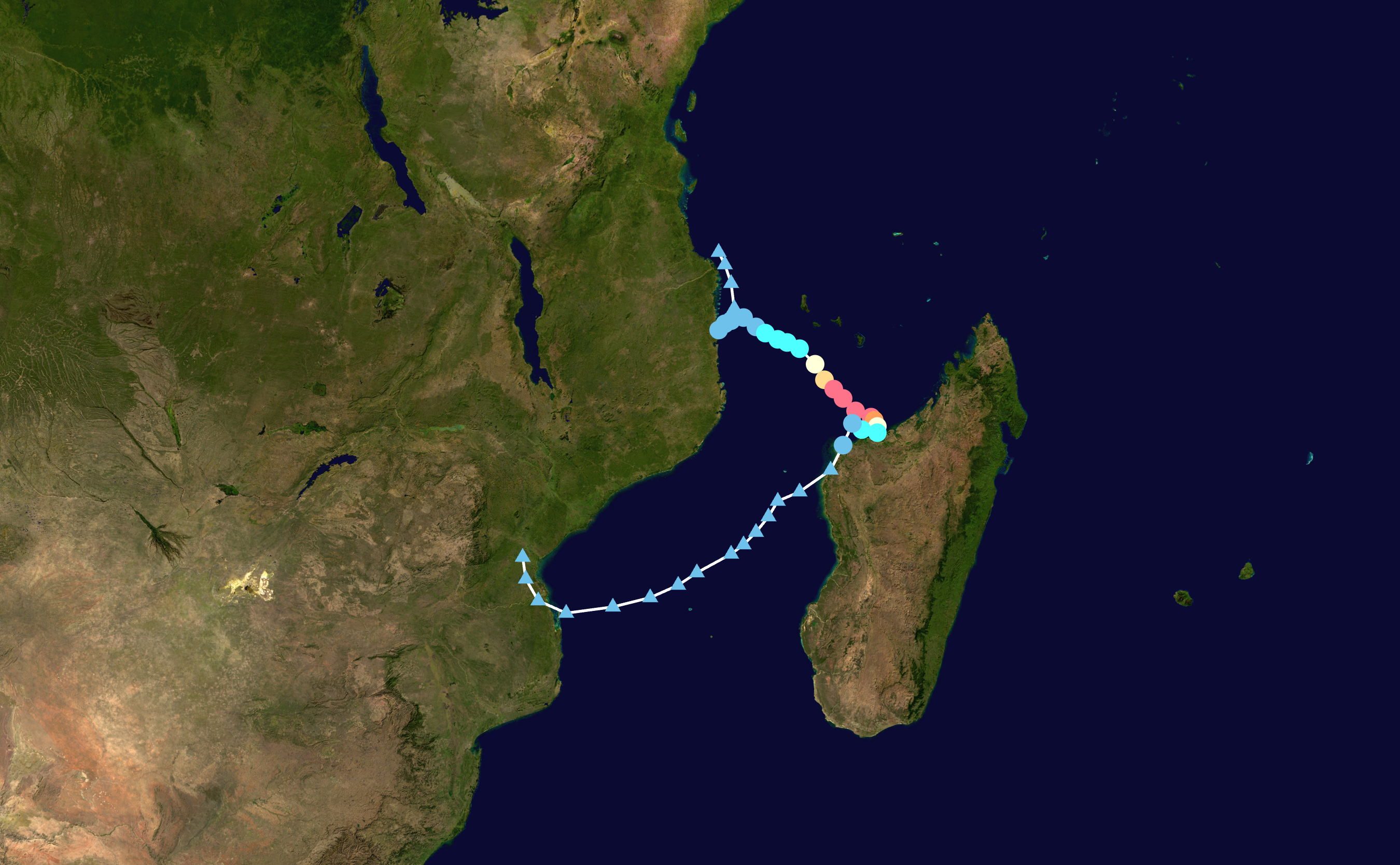
Map plotting the storm's track and intensity, according to the Saffir–Simpson scale Map key Saffir–Simpson scale Tropical depression (≤38 mph, ≤62 km/h) Tropical storm (39–73 mph, 63–118 km/h) Category 1 (74–95 mph, 119–153 km/h) Category 2 (96–110 mph, 154–177 km/h) Category 3 (111–129 mph, 178–208 km/h) Category 4 (130–156 mph, 209–251 km/h) Category 5 (≥157 mph, ≥252 km/h) Unknown Storm type Tropical cyclone Subtropical cyclone Extratropical cyclone, remnant low, tropical disturbance, or monsoon depression

On March 25, 2014, a weak area of low pressure accompanied by broad, flaring convection became increasingly organized over Mozambique. Owing to favorable environmental conditions, featuring low wind shear, vorticity became more enhanced and symmetrical. A compact system, the low steadily organized as it emerged over the Mozambique Channel on March 26. Though continued land interaction initially hindered development, enhanced outflow supported convective development as it straddled the Mozambique–Tanzania border. With high sea surface temperatures in the storm's track, the JTWC anticipated further organization and issued a Tropical Cyclone Formation Alert at 2000 UTC on March 26. Once further offshore on March 27, the Regional Specialized Meteorological Center Météo-France in La Réunion classified the system as Disturbance 14. Drifting slowly eastward, a prominent feeder band developed along the system's eastern side; however, this band disrupted low-level inflow of warm, moist air, and suppressed convection over the circulation center.

Though convection later began to consolidate into a small central dense overcast (CDO) feature by March 28, continued disruption of the low-level inflow prevented much development. Météo-France noted that despite forecasting the storm to peak as a moderate tropical storm, with winds of 85 km/h (50 mph), there was potential for rapid intensification due to the storm's small size. Conversely, the JTWC noted that proximity to land and dry mid-level air, represented by surface outflow boundaries, could hamper significant development. Once further over the Mozambique Channel, the system became increasingly organized and the JTWC initiated advisories on the storm as Tropical Cyclone 21S. Météo-France followed suit at 0000 UTC on March 29 and classified the cyclone as a moderate tropical storm, with the tropical cyclone warning center in Madagascar assigning the name Hellen. Hellen soon assumed an east-southeast track toward Madagascar, as a ridge established itself to the northeast. Throughout March 29, the storm became increasingly organized with an eye apparent on microwave satellite imagery.

Rapid to explosive intensification ensued during the later half of March 29 into March 30 at a rate Météo-France later referred to as "astounding". Deep convective banding wrapped around a ragged eye, which soon contracted to "pinhole" size. This prompted Météo-France to upgrade Hellen to a tropical cyclone with winds estimated at 155 km/h (100 mph) at 0000 UTC on March 30. Six hours later, they further upgraded the storm to an intense tropical cyclone with winds of 195 km/h (120 mph). Hellen attained its peak intensity between 1100 and 1500 UTC as a very intense tropical cyclone, with winds of 230 km/h (145 mph), gusts reaching 325 km/h (200 mph), and a barometric pressure of 915 mbar (hPa; 27.02 inHg). This ranked it as one of the most powerful storms over the Mozambique Channel on record. The storm featured a 20 km (12 mi) wide eye embedded within a symmetrical and intense CDO, spanning 240 km (150 mi) across. The JTWC estimated Hellen to have attained one-minute sustained winds of 250 km/h (155 mph), making it a high-end Category 4-equivalent cyclone on the Saffir–Simpson hurricane wind scale, although this was lowered to 240 km/h (150 mph) in reanalysis.

After peak intensity, the cyclone's eye soon began to fill and cool as weakening ensued. Defying previous forecasts, Hellen continued on a southeasterly track toward Madagascar and the likelihood of it making landfall became apparent. By the end of March 30, Hellen's eye had collapsed and disappeared from satellite imagery, as the combination of dry air and land interaction took their toll on the storm. At about 0800 UTC on March 31, Hellen made landfall on Mitsinjo with winds of 110 km/h (70 mph), and the previously unfavorable conditions coupled with land interaction to induce rapid weakening. The ridge to the east turned Hellen to a southwest drift over land. By early on April 1, the convection largely dissipated as the center became difficult to locate, with peak winds dropping to 45 km/h (30 mph). As a result, Météo-France discontinued advisories that day, as did the JTWC. The remnants moved back over open waters, but were not expected to reorganize due to the poor nature of the convection. As the low continued to the west, the convection increased on April 4 while approaching the coastline of Mozambique, although the system failed to redevelop before moving onshore.

== Preparations and impact ==
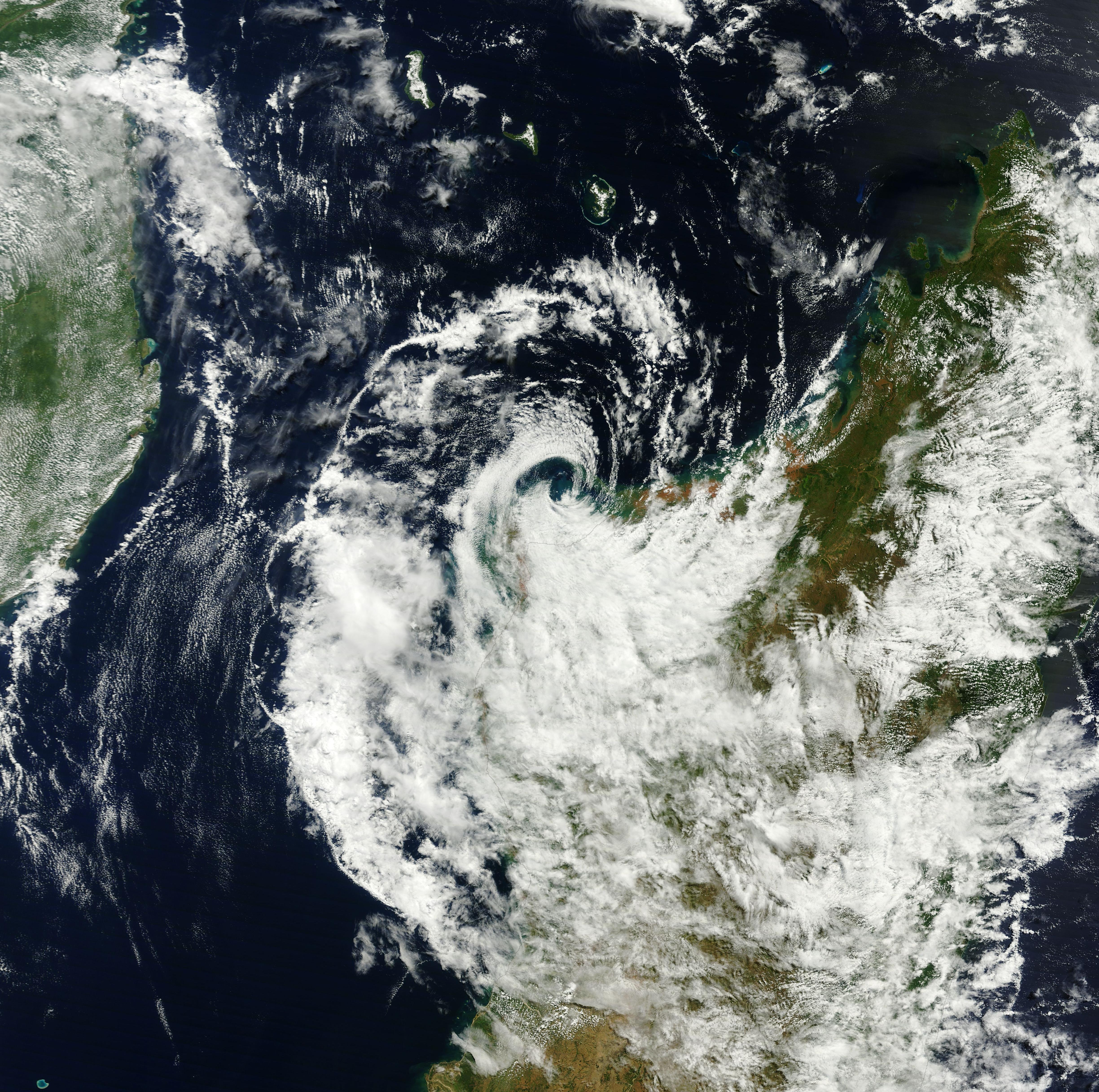
Cyclone Hellen on April 1. The storm had lost most of its convection due to land interaction.

During its formative stages, Hellen meandered around northern Mozambique and produced prolonged heavy rains over the region. The city of Pemba in Cabo Delgado Province was the hardest hit area, with the Messalo River over-topping its banks. Tagir Carimo, mayor of Pemba, described the rains as the heaviest he had seen in 20 years. More than 100 poorly constructed homes collapsed in the floods while severe erosion exposed and destroyed water pipes. A major bridge connecting Pemba to surrounding areas was washed away by the Messalo river. This isolated the northern portion of Cabo Delgado Province from the rest of the country, forcing ferries to transport cars. Three people died in the district of Cariaco when their home collapsed while a fourth drowned in Chiuba. Distributing assistance following the storm was disrupted by damaged roads.

=== Comoro Islands ===
Heavy rains and storm surge caused significant damage on all three islands of the Comoros, with the worst occurring on Anjouan. There, 901 houses were damaged, of which about 20% were destroyed. Flooding displaced 389 people in Salamani where 33 mud-built homes were destroyed. Landslides isolated the villages of Chiconi, Hamaba, Koni-Djodjo, Miringoni, and Nioumachioi, and damaged a road between Ngandzalé and Domoni. On the island, 7,879 people had to evacuate their houses due to the risk of further landslides, some of whom went to schools set up as shelters while others stayed with family or friends. Storm surge on Mohéli flooded parts of Tsamia, Walla, and Zirindani, resulting in one fatality. Several houses were damaged on the island, and Djandro lost power due to a damaged power line. The Prince Said Ibrahim International Airport in Moroni on Grande Comore was closed for about 24 hours due to the storm. Also on the island, a road was damaged, and one house was flooded. Shortly after the storm, workers began repairing roads and distributing aid.

Though the center of Cyclone Hellen remained south of Mayotte, it prompted an "orange alert" on March 30 for the area due to the potential for hurricane-force gusts. The storm's rapid intensification caught most residents on the island off-guard, with widespread disruptions to traffic and electricity taking place. Wind gusts up to 100 km/h (62 mph) downed trees and power lines, blocking off roads while heavy rains caused significant flooding. A peak 24‑hour rainfall of 239 mm (9.4 in) was measured in Mtsamboro between March 29 and 30. In M'Tsangamouji, cars were swept away by a swollen river. Along the coast, waves up to 5 m (16 ft) damaged marinas in Dzaoudzi, Hagnoundrou, and Mamoudzou where skiffs were smashed against rocks or stranded.

=== Madagascar ===
On March 31, a boat capsized off the coast of northwest Madagascar, killing three and leaving nine others missing. High seas washed away 20 canoes along the coast. Initial assessments of damage across Madagascar were initially hampered by poor weather and inaccessibility. The storm flooded 7,795 ha (19,260 acres) of rice fields across the country, as well as 114 ha (280 acres) of other crops, threatening harvests after a locust outbreak had occurred in the months prior to the storm. The storm also killed 23 zebu and damaged two dams. Cyclone Hellen destroyed 437 houses and damaged or flooded 174 others, leaving 1,736 people homeless during its passage. The storm also damaged two health facilities and five schools. Overall impact from Hellen was less than expected due to its weakening, with most telephone lines still intact.

Due to the storm affecting water access in northwestern Madagascar, there was concern for a disease outbreak, with a flu outbreak noted in Mahajanga. The national Red Cross utilized 54 volunteers to assist in the storm's aftermath, such as distributing kitchen kits and agriculture units. Residents donated 2 million ariary ($800 USD) to the Red Cross, which were used to purchase medicines, while the government provided 600 kg (1,300 lb) of rice for affected residents.

== See also ==
- Cyclone Gillian, which rapidly intensified from a tropical low to a Category 5 cyclone in less than 48 hours in the Australian region just one week before Hellen.
- Other intense tropical cyclones in the Mozambique Channel

Tropical cyclones in the Comoros Islands
Cyclone Funso in 2012 – 205 km/h (127 mph) and 925 mbar (925 hPa; 27.3 inHg)
Cyclone Fanele in 2009 – 185 km/h (115 mph) and 930 mbar (930 hPa; 27 inHg)
Cyclone Japhet in 2003 – 175 km/h (109 mph) and 935 mbar (935 hPa; 27.6 inHg)

- Cyclone Idai – A devastating tropical cyclone that affected the same regions in 2019
- Cyclone Belna
