= Ambalakida =

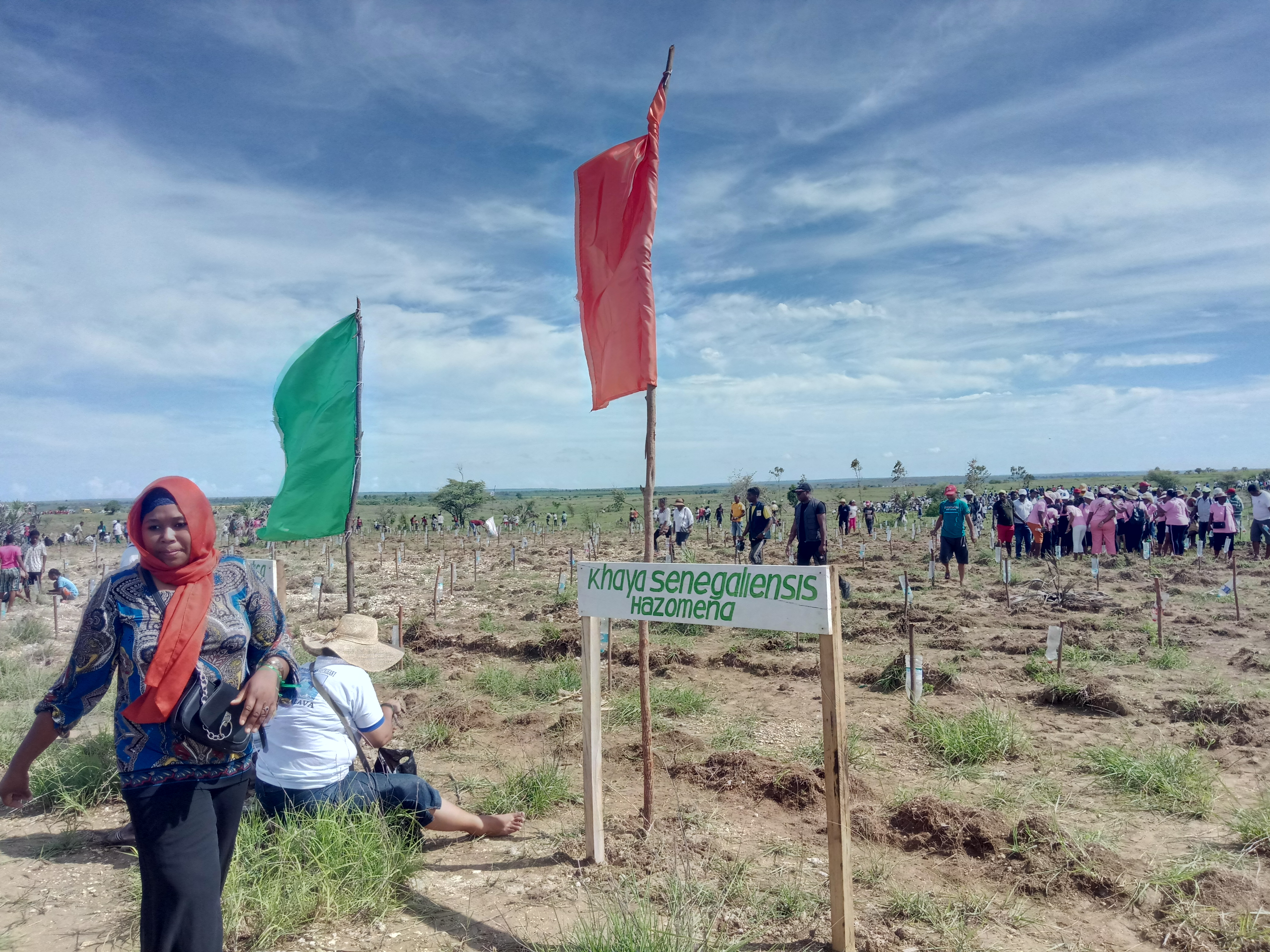
- planting trees in Marohogo, a village of Ambalakida

- Location in Madagascar
- Coordinates: 15°47′S 46°35′E
- Country: Madagascar
- Region: Boeny
- District: Mahajanga II
- Elevation: 70 m (230 ft)

Population (2001)
  - Total: 5,000
- Time zone: UTC3 (EAT)
- Postal code: 402

Ambalakida is a rural municipality in Madagascar. It belongs to the district of Mahajanga II, which is a part of Boeny Region. The population of the commune was estimated to be approximately 5,000 in 2001 commune census.

== Industry ==
There is a sugar cane mill in Antanamifafy, a village that belongs to this municipality.
