= Matsakabanja =

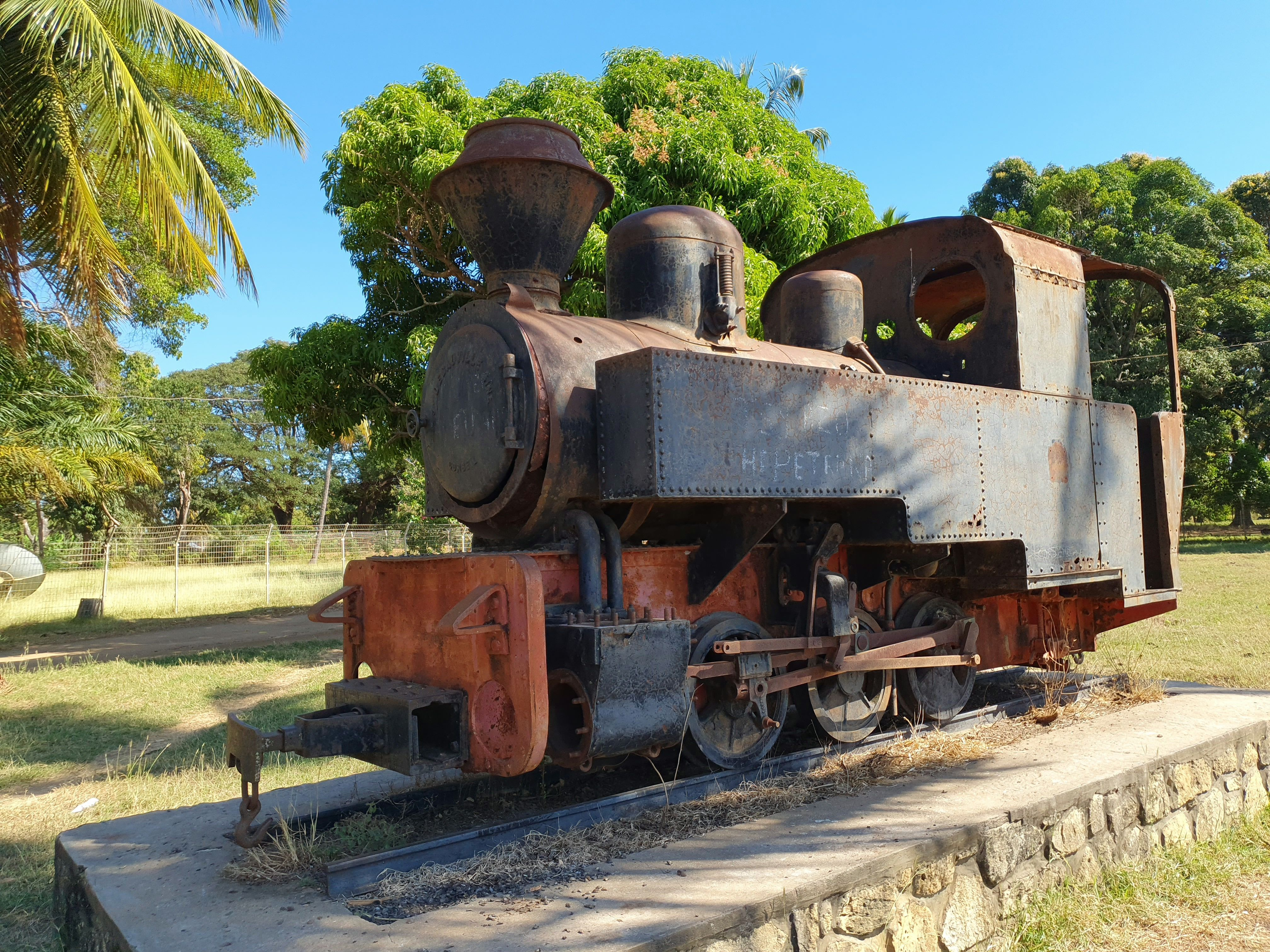
- locomotive of the sugar mill in Namakia

- Location in Madagascar
- Coordinates: 15°55′S 45°50′E
- Country: Madagascar
- Region: Boeny
- District: Mitsinjo
- Elevation: 7 m (23 ft)

Population (2001)
  - Total: 18,000
- Time zone: UTC3 (EAT)
- Postal code: 417

Matsakabanja is a rural municipality in Madagascar. It belongs to the district of Mitsinjo, which is a part of Boeny Region. The population of the commune was estimated to be approximately 18,000 in 2001 commune census.

Matsakabanja is served by a local airport and riverine harbour. In addition to primary schooling the town offers secondary education at both junior and senior levels. Farming and raising livestock provides employment for 24% and 24% of the working population. The most important crop is sugarcane, while other important products are maize, cassava and rice. Industry and services provide employment for 30% and 2% of the population, respectively. Additionally fishing employs 20% of the population.

== Industry ==
- The sugar mill of Namakia.

== Sports Clubs ==
- Sirama Namakia
