= Ambalabe Befanjava =

- Location in Madagascar
- Coordinates: 15°51′S 47°2′E
- Country: Madagascar
- Region: Boeny
- District: Mahajanga II
- Elevation: 32 m (105 ft)

Population (2001)
  - Total: 4,000
- Time zone: UTC3 (EAT)
- Climate: Aw

Ambalabe Befanjava is a town and commune (Malagasy: kaominina) in Madagascar. It belongs to the district of Mahajanga II, which is a part of Boeny Region. The population of the commune was estimated to be approximately 4,000 in 2001 commune census.

Primary and junior level secondary education are available in town. The majority 96% of the population of the commune are farmers. The most important crop is rice, while other important products are maize and cassava. Services provide employment for 4% of the population.
