= Betsako =

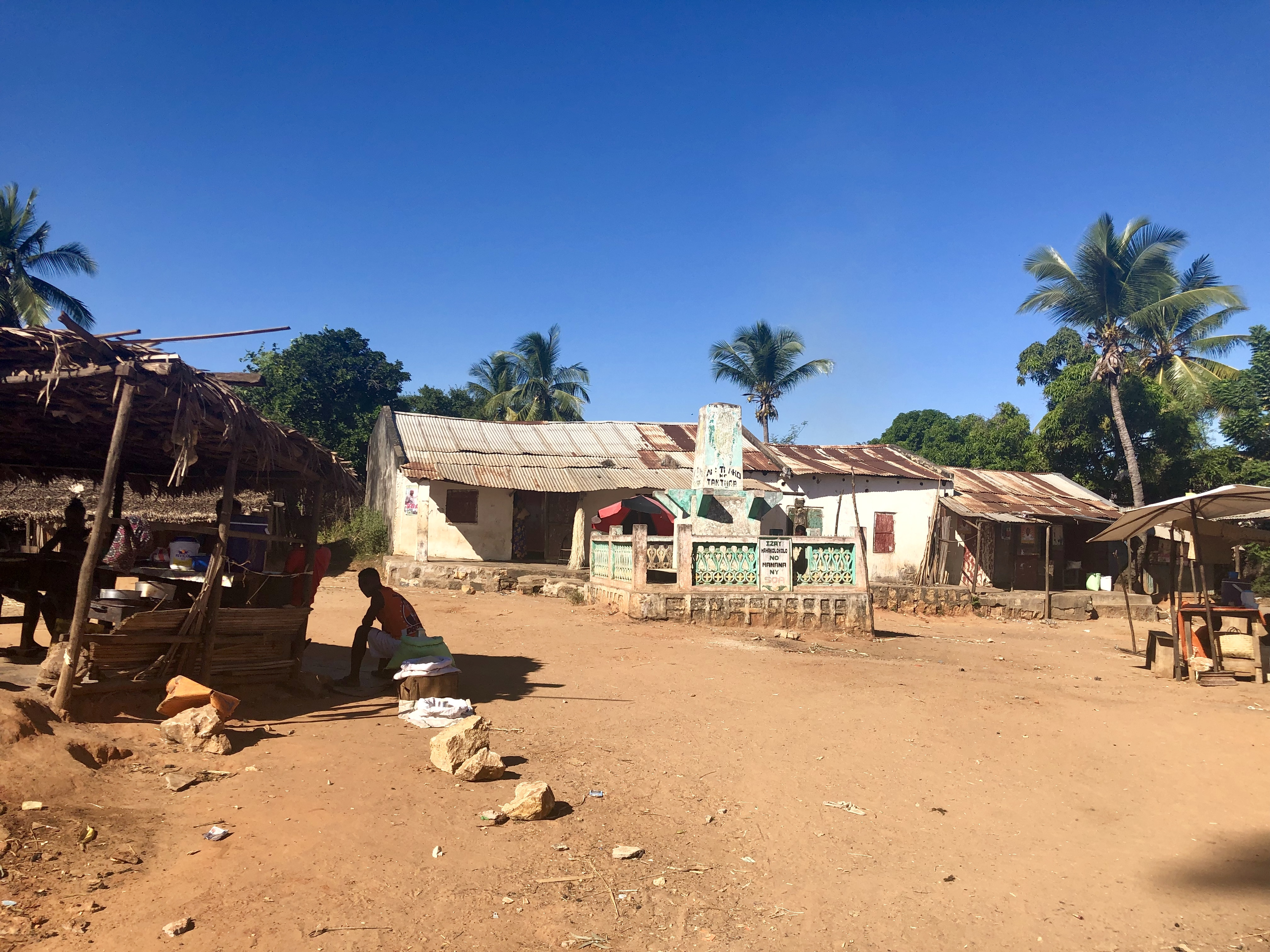
- Monument or Tsangambato at the center of commune Betsako

- Location in Madagascar
- Coordinates: 15°37′49.8″S 46°30′20.2″E
- Country: Madagascar
- Region: Boeny
- District: Mahajanga II
- Elevation: 34 m (112 ft)

Population (2001)
  - Total: 7,000
- Time zone: UTC3 (EAT)

Betsako is a town and commune (Malagasy: kaominina) in Madagascar. It belongs to the district of Mahajanga II, which is a part of Boeny. The population of the commune was estimated to be approximately 7,000 in a 2001 commune census.

Only primary schooling is available. The majority (94%) of the population of the commune are farmers. The most important crop is tomatoes, while other important products are mangoes, cassava and sweet potatoes. Services provide employment for 1% of the population. Additionally fishing employs 5% of the population.
