= Antongomena Bevary =

- Location in Madagascar
- Coordinates: 15°57′S 45°56′E
- Country: Madagascar
- Region: Boeny
- District: Mitsinjo
- Elevation: 7 m (23 ft)

Population (2001)
  - Total: 13,000
- Time zone: UTC3 (EAT)

Antongomena Bevary is a town and commune (Malagasy: kaominina) in Madagascar. It belongs to the district of Mitsinjo, which is a part of Boeny Region. The population of the commune was estimated to be approximately 13,000 in 2001 commune census.

Only primary schooling is available. The majority 94% of the population of the commune are farmers. The most important crop is rice, while other important products are cassava and sweet potatoes. Services provide employment for 1% of the population. Additionally fishing employs 5% of the population.
