= Cyclone Belna =

South-West Indian cyclone in 2019

Tropical Cyclone Belna
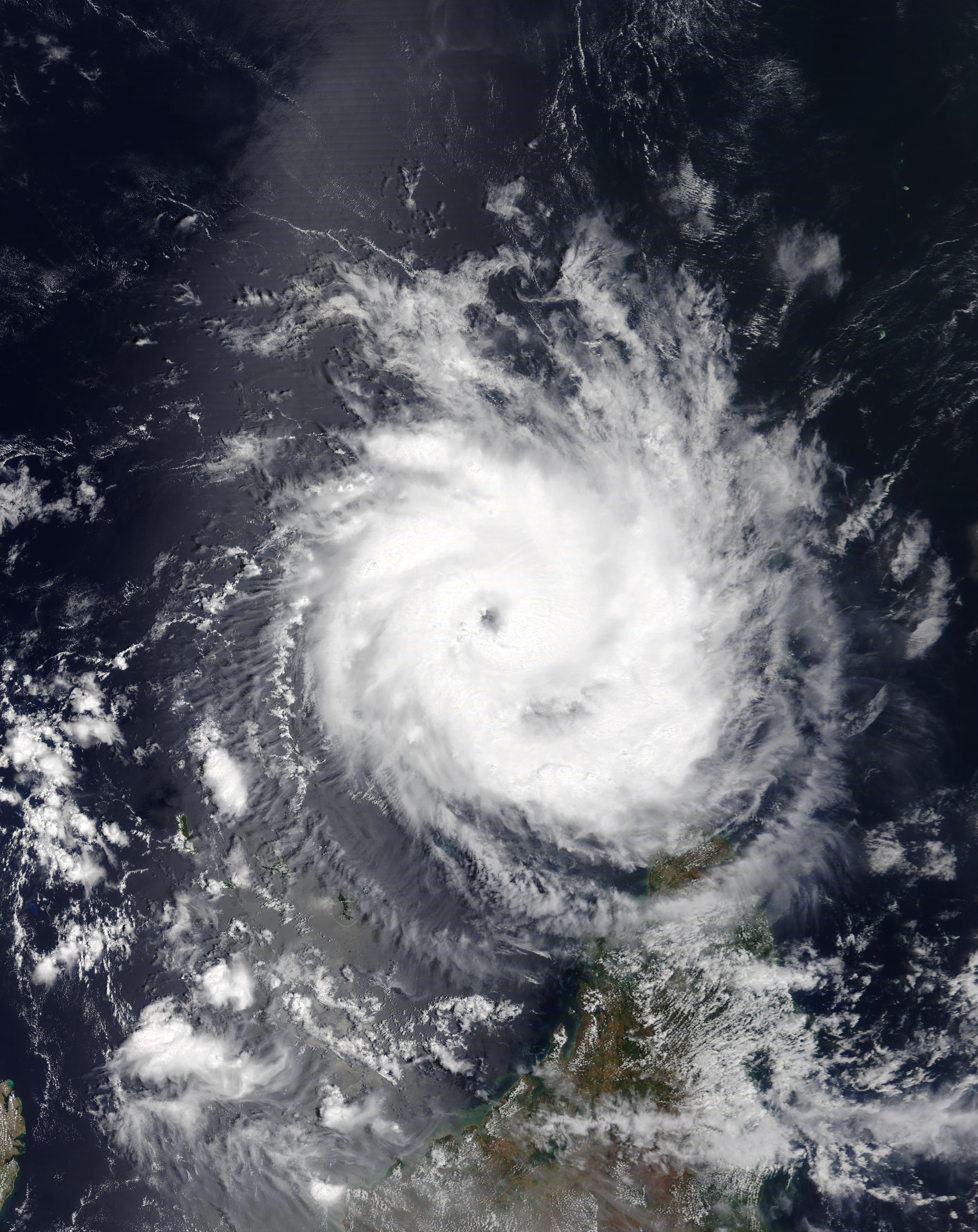
- Belna strengthening over Seychelles on 7 December

Meteorological history
- Formed: 5 December 2019
- Remnant low: 10 December 2019
- Dissipated: 11 December 2019

Tropical cyclone
- 10-minute sustained (MF)
- Highest winds: 155 km/h (100 mph)
- Highest gusts: 220 km/h (140 mph)
- Lowest pressure: 965 hPa (mbar); 28.50 inHg

Category 3-equivalent tropical cyclone
- 1-minute sustained (SSHWS/JTWC)
- Highest winds: 185 km/h (115 mph)
- Lowest pressure: 962 hPa (mbar); 28.41 inHg

Overall effects
- Fatalities: 2 total
- Damage: >$25 million (2019 USD)
- Areas affected: Seychelles, Mayotte, Comoros, Madagascar
- IBTrACS /
- Part of the 2019–20 South-West Indian Ocean cyclone season

Tropical Cyclone Belna was a strong tropical cyclone that made landfall over northwestern Madagascar in December 2019, becoming the first to do so since Hellen in 2014. Belna's precursor—an initially broad trough of low pressure west of Seychelles—was formally designated as a zone of disturbed weather on 2 December during a favourable period for tropical cyclogenesis in the Indian Ocean. The disturbance gradually developed over the course of several days, tracking slowly westward. Météo-France (MFR) upgraded the system to a tropical depression on 5 December and then to a tropical storm later that day. Belna reached tropical cyclone strength on 7 December as it began to turn towards the southwest, peaking with maximum sustained winds of 155 km/h (95 mph) before fluctuating in intensity over the following day as it passed just east of Mayotte. On 9 December, Belna restrengthened and reattained its peak winds upon making landfall near Soalala along the northwestern coast of Madagascar. The cyclone weakened before ultimately dissipating over southern Madagascar on 11 December.

In the French overseas department of Mayotte, up to 15,000 people relocated to shelters in advance of the storm. Several of the department's services, including the main airport and ferries, were suspended. The cyclone ultimately passed 100 km (62 mi) east of Mayotte with only minor impacts. Northern Madagascar was impacted by heavy rains from Belna. Soalala and Antsiranana experienced extensive flooding. Strong winds in Soalala damaged the roofs of 80% of homes and government offices. In total, there were nine fatalities and over 2,000 injuries associated with Belna. Damage in Madagascar is estimated at US$25 million.

== Meteorological history ==
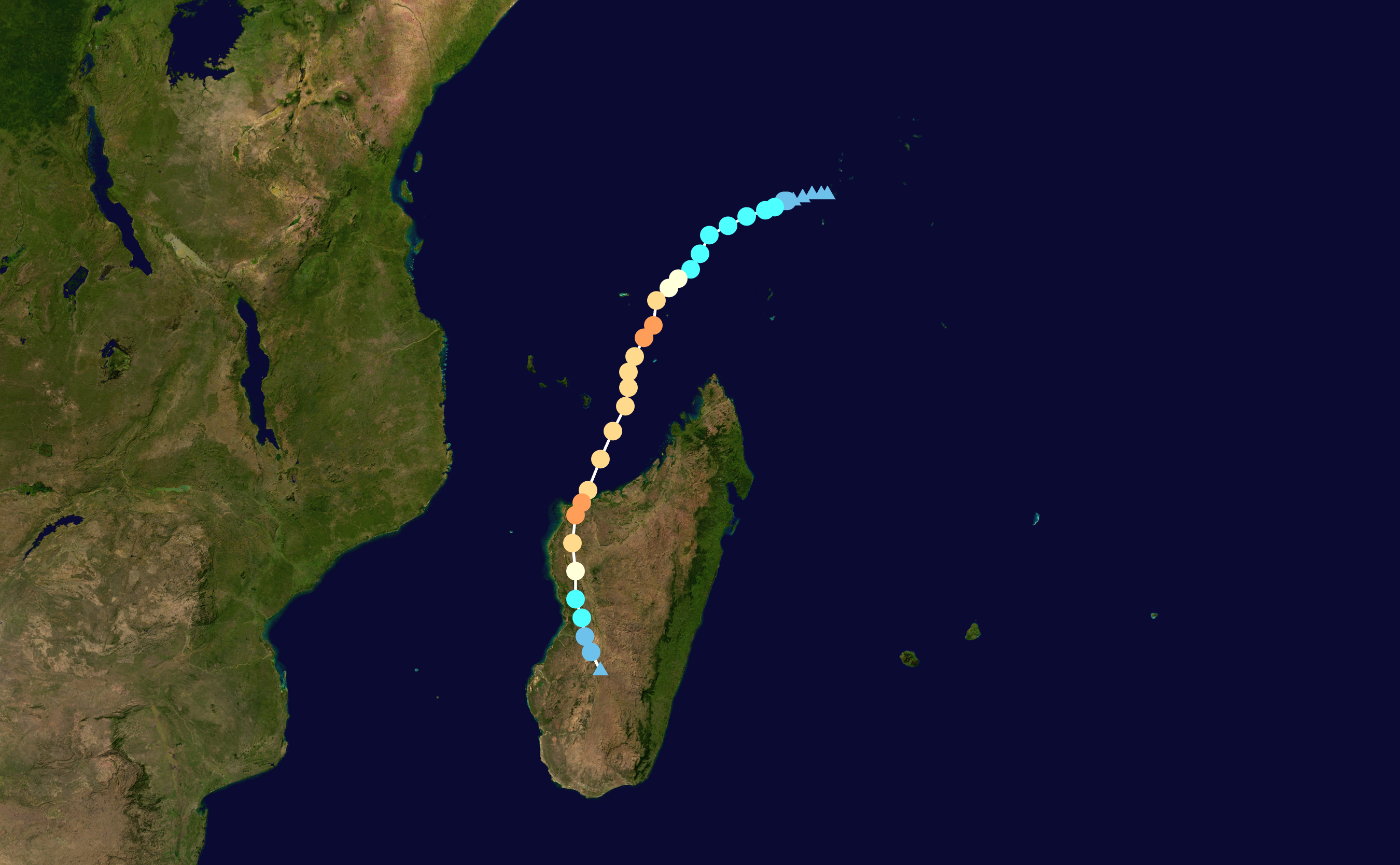
Map plotting the storm's track and intensity, according to the Saffir–Simpson scale Map key Saffir–Simpson scale Tropical depression (≤38 mph, ≤62 km/h) Tropical storm (39–73 mph, 63–118 km/h) Category 1 (74–95 mph, 119–153 km/h) Category 2 (96–110 mph, 154–177 km/h) Category 3 (111–129 mph, 178–208 km/h) Category 4 (130–156 mph, 209–251 km/h) Category 5 (≥157 mph, ≥252 km/h) Unknown Storm type Tropical cyclone Subtropical cyclone Extratropical cyclone, remnant low, tropical disturbance, or monsoon depression

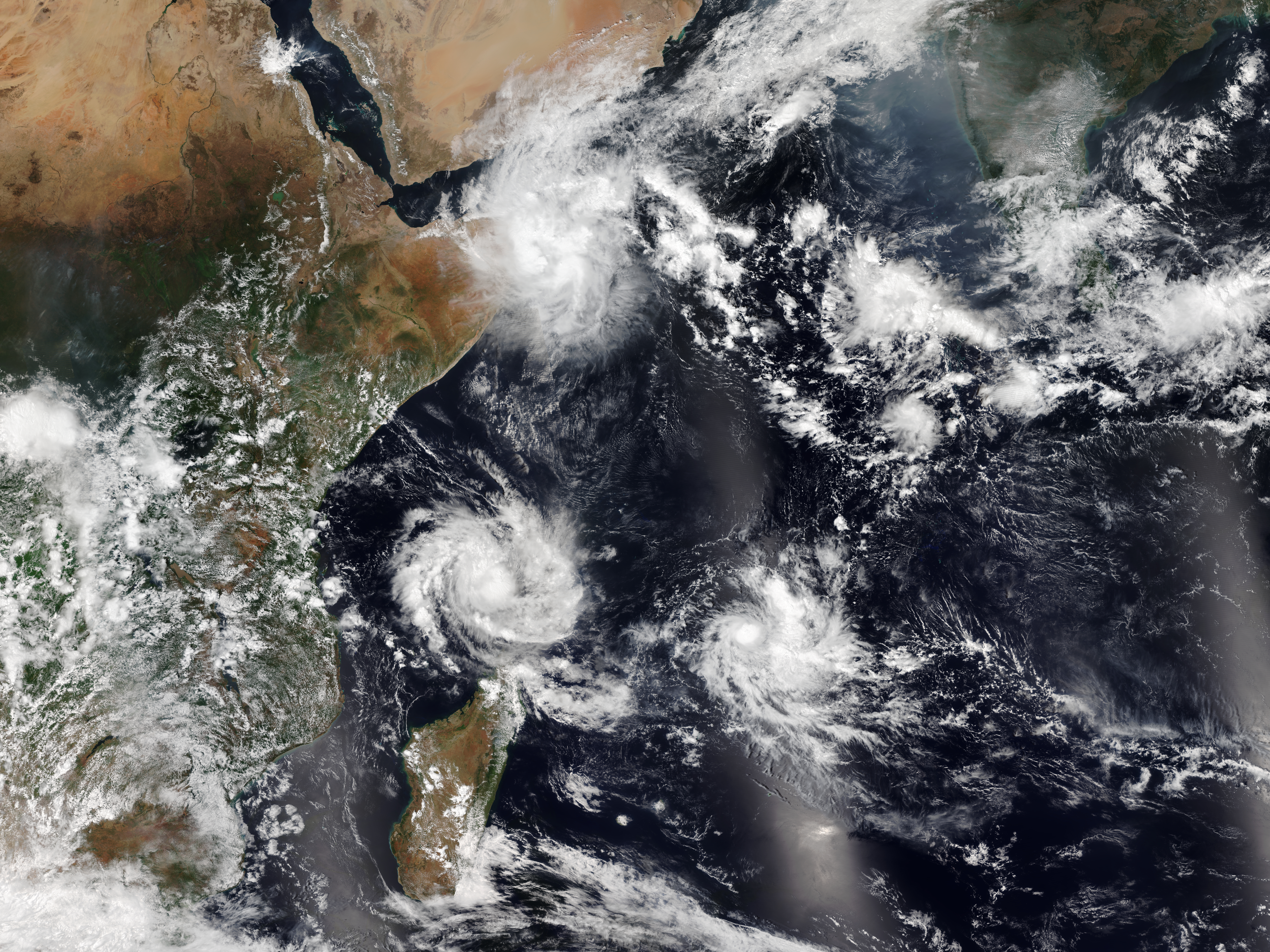
Three simultaneously active cyclones in the North and South-West Indian Ocean. From top left to right: Pawan, Belna, and Ambali

MFR began highlighting the potential for tropical cyclone development in their daily bulletins on 25 November, noting an increase in shower activity west of Seychelles. Aided by the passage of a Kelvin wave and a favourable window in the Madden–Julian oscillation, a broad trough of low pressure began to take shape within the storm activity, extending across the equator. Projections from computer models remained in disagreement over the system's future, complicated by the concurrent development of a tropical disturbance in the northwestern Indian Ocean along the same trough. A loosely defined wind circulation was detected 263 km (163 mi) south of Mahe, Seychelles on 29 November, offset from convection. Over the following days, this circulation tightened within an environment moderately conducive for tropical development. Météo-France declared the system as a zone of disturbed weather on 2 December; at the time the system had drifted west from its point of origin. Although the storm was better organised and the environment conducive for intensification, the storm's wind field initially remained elongated and rainfall remained north of the storm's centre. The disturbance became a tropical depression on 5 December, attended by an increase in rainbands and the return of convection at the centre of circulation; at 18:00 UTC that day, the system was upgraded to Moderate Tropical Storm Belna.

Belna was upgraded to severe tropical storm status early on 6 December. Around the same time, a cloud-obscured eye briefly became apparent in microwave satellite imagery. Due to a strengthening area of high pressure to its east, Belna began to curve from its initial westward drift to a more directed southwestward trajectory. After a brief period of strengthening, Belna's central dense overcast remained largely unchanged throughout 6 December before signs of resumed intensification emerged by the day's end, followed by the development of another eye 9–19 km (5.6–11.8 mi) across. With the storm's eye becoming better defined, MFR upgraded Belna to a tropical cyclone early on 7 December. Hot towers were detected atop and within the storm's radius of maximum winds, suggesting the onset of a more accelerated rate of intensification. However, the presence of dry air in the mid-levels of the troposphere towards the storm's southeastern quadrant prevented Belna from developing considerably. At 18:00 UTC on 7 December, Belna's winds topped out at 155 km/h (95 mph) before fluctuating at a slightly lower strength over the ensuing day. The system's structure disorganised significantly in a short period, caused by both the dry air and northerly wind shear.

The cyclone's structure varied considerably throughout 8 December, at times featuring a small eye surrounded by intense lightning activity and at other times degrading in response to an intrusion of dry air into the Belna's circulation. Belna's strength was highly variable in part due to its small size, making it susceptible to changes in the local atmospheric environment and complicating forecasts. On 9 December, a new phase of intensification began as Belna approached the Madagascar coast near Soalala, with an eye becoming apparent on visible satellite imagery. In its advisories, the MFR noted a "spectacular intensification spell" in the hours leading up to Belna's landfall on Madagascar, assessing the cyclone's winds at 155 km/h (95 mph) and the pressure at 965 mbar (965 hPa; 28.5 inHg)–the lowest analysed over the course of the storm's existence—as Belna moved ashore at 15:30 UTC on 9 December. The storm then began to weaken as it tracked farther inland, parallelling the western coast of Madagascar. By 12:00 UTC the next day, Belna's winds had tapered below tropical depression thresholds, though the storm retained a well-defined wind circulation with tightly packed rainbands. Belna curved towards the southeast over Madagascar, and deep convection associated with the cyclone dissipated on 11 December. MFR issued their last update on the system later that day while the centre was over Haute Matsiatra, while the remnant circulation centre associated with Belna was last noted in MFR's bulletins on 14 December.

== Preparations and impact ==
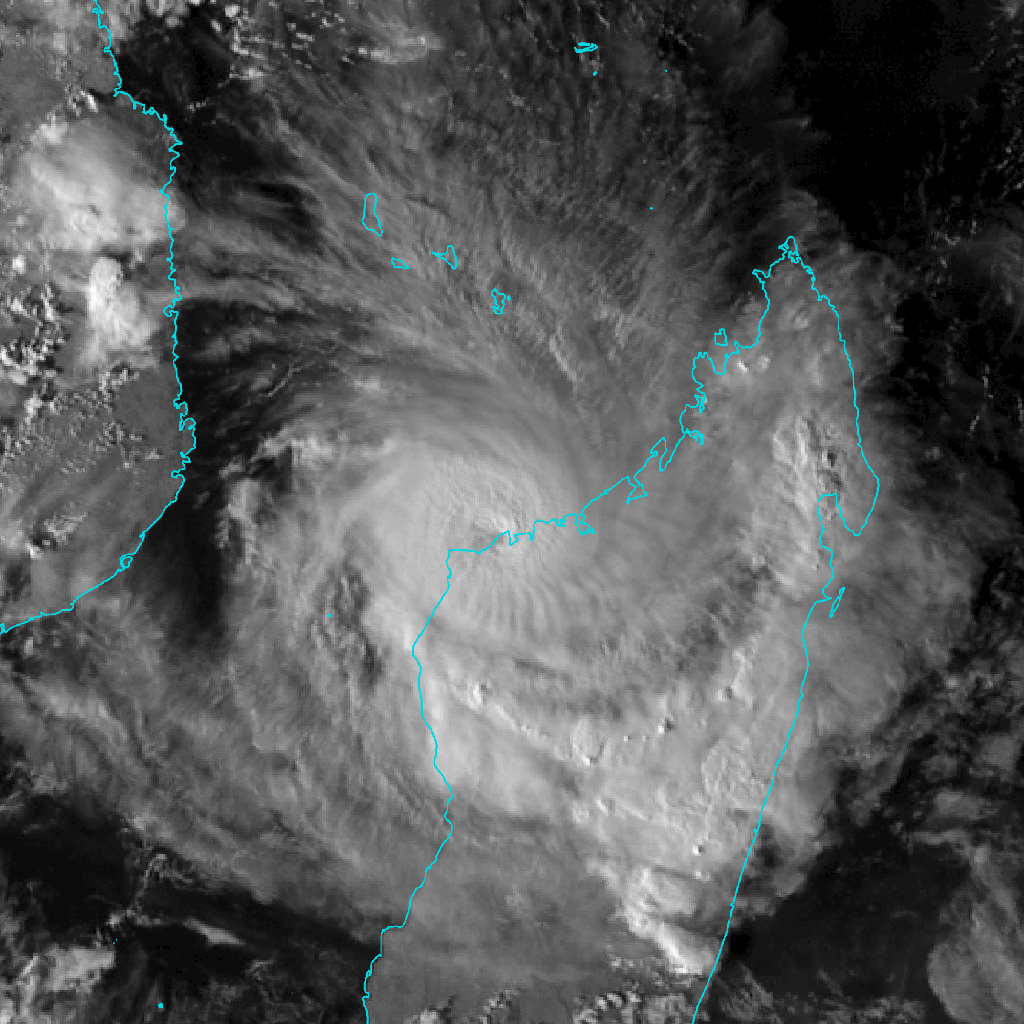
Belna nearing northwestern Madagascar on 9 December

=== Comoros and Mayotte ===
A cyclone pre-alert was issued for Mayotte on 6 December, succeeded by an orange and later red alert the following day. Comoros was placed under an orange alert during Belna's passage. Civil security personnel from mainland France and Reunion, some from the National Gendarmerie, were sent to Mayotte to aid storm preparation efforts there. Shelters were opened in several Mayotte communes on 7 December to facilitate mandatory evacuations declared by Mayotte Prefect Jean-François Colombet; approximately 10,000–15,000 people relocated to shelters in Mayotte. Several shelters housed over a thousand evacuees. To preserve the integrity of the department's water systems, water distribution was suspended. Dzaoudzi–Pamandzi International Airport and Mayotte's roads were closed ahead of the storm. Regular ferry service between Petite-Terre and Grande-Terre was also suspended. Belna ultimately passed 100 km (62 mi) east of Mayotte on the morning of 9 December, with impacts on the island mitigated further by the storm's small size.

=== Madagascar ===
Météo Madagascar first issued green alerts for Madagascan districts in Diana, Sava, and Sofia on 4 December based on a high probability of Belna impacting northeastern Madagascar. Accordingly, cyclone response measures were activated by the National Office for Risk and Disaster Management (BNGRC) and humanitarian organisations across northern Madagascar. By 9 December, 11 humanitarian agencies were active in northern parts of the country. Green alerts were later extended to encompass five districts, and red alerts were eventually issued to all districts in Boeny and Melaky. Schools were closed along Madagascar's western coast. Three teams from the BNGRC tasked with emergency coordination and medicine distribution were dispatched to Mahajanga, Morondava, and Toliara. The International Federation of Red Cross and Red Crescent Societies initiated a Disaster Relief Emergency Fund in response to Belna on 9 December, allocating CHF146,491 to 2,500 people within at-risk areas.

Approximately 2,900 Malagasy were affected by Belna. Heavy rains and strong winds impacted Boeny ahead of the storm. Belna's rainbands began affecting the Diana region on 7 December. Low-lying areas of Antsiranana were flooded, inundating entire neighbourhoods. Most of Soalala, where Belna made landfall, was flooded. Homes and government buildings were damaged in the city, including 650 homes. Strong winds damaged the roofs of 80% of residences and government offices. Damage to homes displaced 1,400 people, forcing them to seek refuge in mosques, offices, and schools. Outside of Soalala, 900 others were rendered homeless. The city's hospital was inundated with seawater following the collapse of a protective dyke. Another 55 buildings were damaged in the Diana Region and 22 in the Melaky Region. As of 10 December 2019, two deaths and three missing persons were reported; another 2,693 were injured. In the storm's aftermath, the BNGRC provisioned food and relief supplies to Mahajanga.

== See also ==
- Cyclone Bondo – made landfall near Mahajanga, killing 11
- Cyclone Fame – struck northwestern Madagascar at a similar intensity
- Cyclone Hellen – slow-moving storm that brought flooding rainfall to Mayotte and northwestern Madagascar
- Cyclone Herold
- Tropical cyclones in 2019
- Weather of 2019
