= Marovoay District =

- District
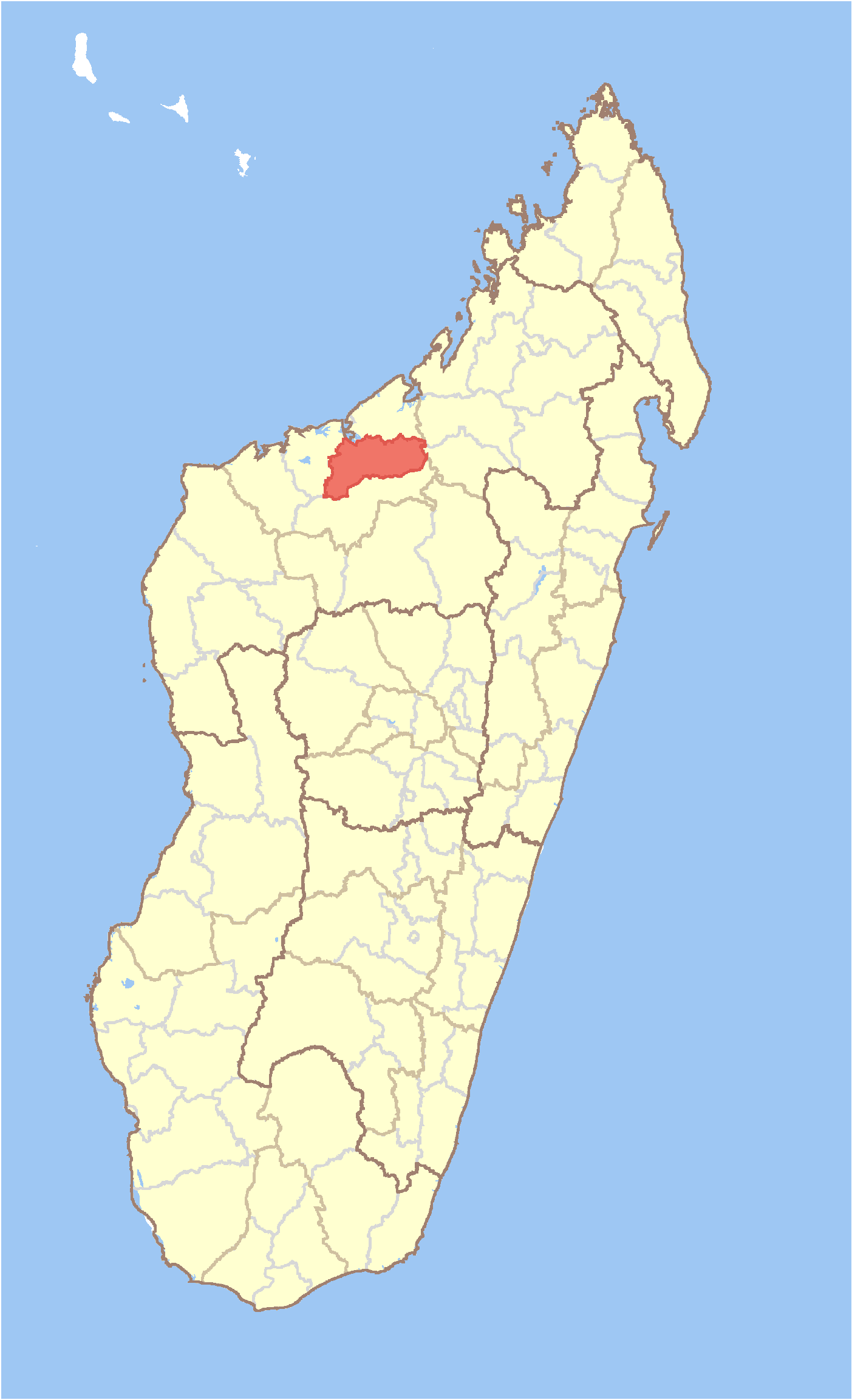
- Location in Madagascar
- Coordinates: 16°9′S 46°37′E
- Country: Madagascar
- Region: Boeny

Area
  - Total: 3,804 km^{2} (1,469 sq mi)

Population (2013)
  - Total: 182,742
  - Density: 48.04/km^{2} (124.4/sq mi)
- Time zone: UTC3 (EAT)

Marovoay is a district in northwestern Madagascar. It is a part of Boeny Region and borders the districts of Mahajanga II in north, Boriziny and Mampikony in east, Ambato-Boeni in south and Mitsinjo in west. The area is 3,804 km^{2} (1,469 sq mi) and the population was estimated to be 182,742 in 2013.

== Communes ==
The district is further divided into 12 communes:

- Ambolomoty
- Ankaraobato
- Ankazomborona
- Anosinalainolona
- Antanambao Andranolava
- Antanimasaka
- Bemaharivo
- Manaratsandry
- Marosakoa
- Marovoay
- Marovoay Banlieue
- Tsararano

== Rivers ==
The Betsiboka River.

== Protected areas ==
- Part of Bombetoka Belomboka protected area
- Part of Ankarafantsika National Park
