= Mitsinjo =

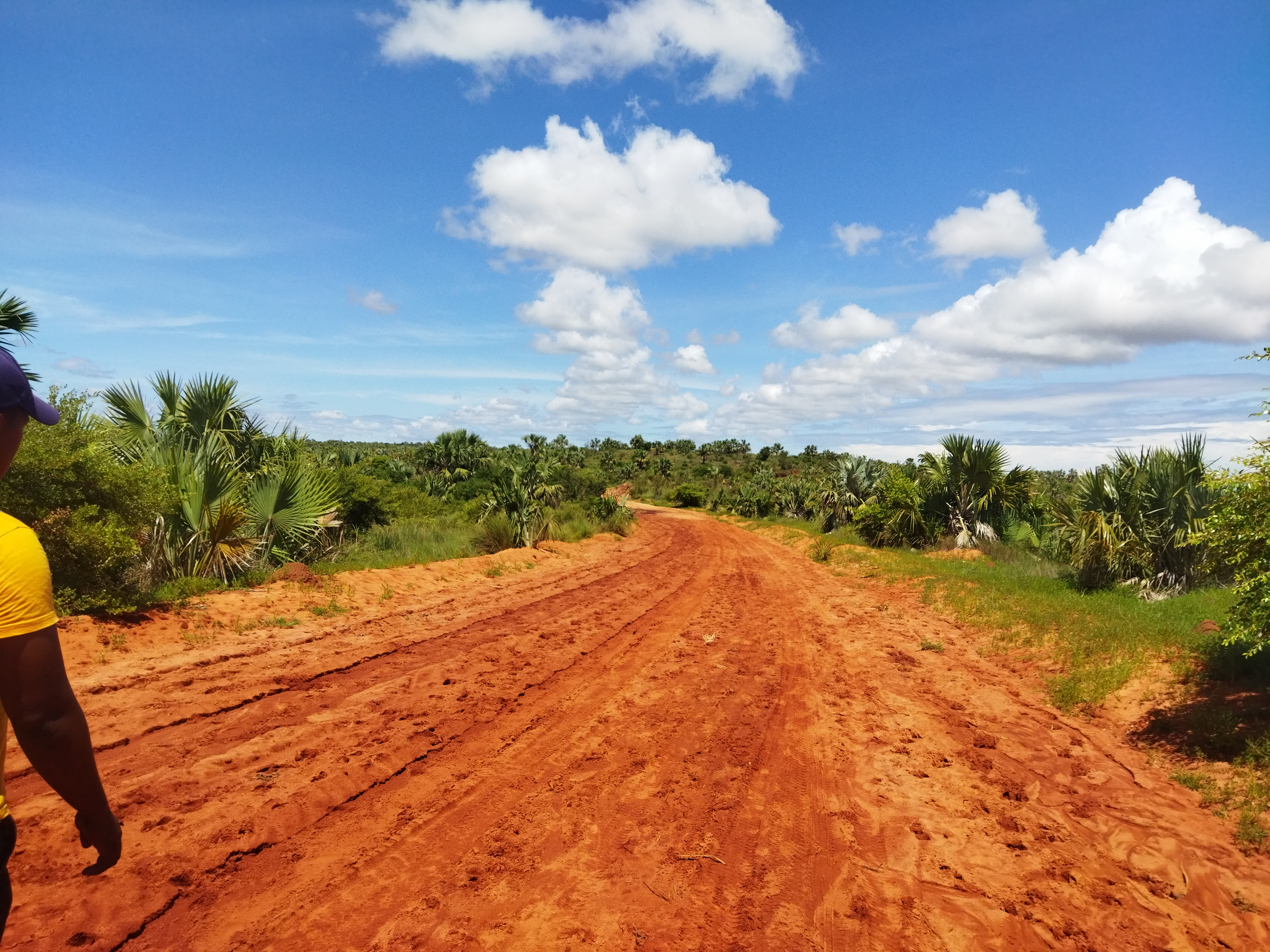
- Road from Katsepy to Mitsinjo

- Location in Madagascar
- Coordinates: 16°0′S 45°52′E
- Country: Madagascar
- Region: Boeny
- District: Mitsinjo
- Elevation: 23 m (75 ft)

Population (2001)
  - Total: 19,000
- Time zone: UTC3 (EAT)
- Postal code: 417

Mitsinjo is a rural municipality in western Madagascar approximately 70 kilometres south-west of Mahajanga. It belongs to the district of Mitsinjo, which is a part of Boeny Region. The population of the commune was estimated to be approximately 19,000 in 2001.

In addition to primary schooling the town offers secondary education at both junior and senior levels. The majority 70% of the population works in fishing. 15% are farmers, while an additional 10% receives their livelihood from raising livestock. The most important crops are maize and rice; also sweet potatoes is an important agricultural product. Services provide employment for 5% of the population.
