= Katsepy =

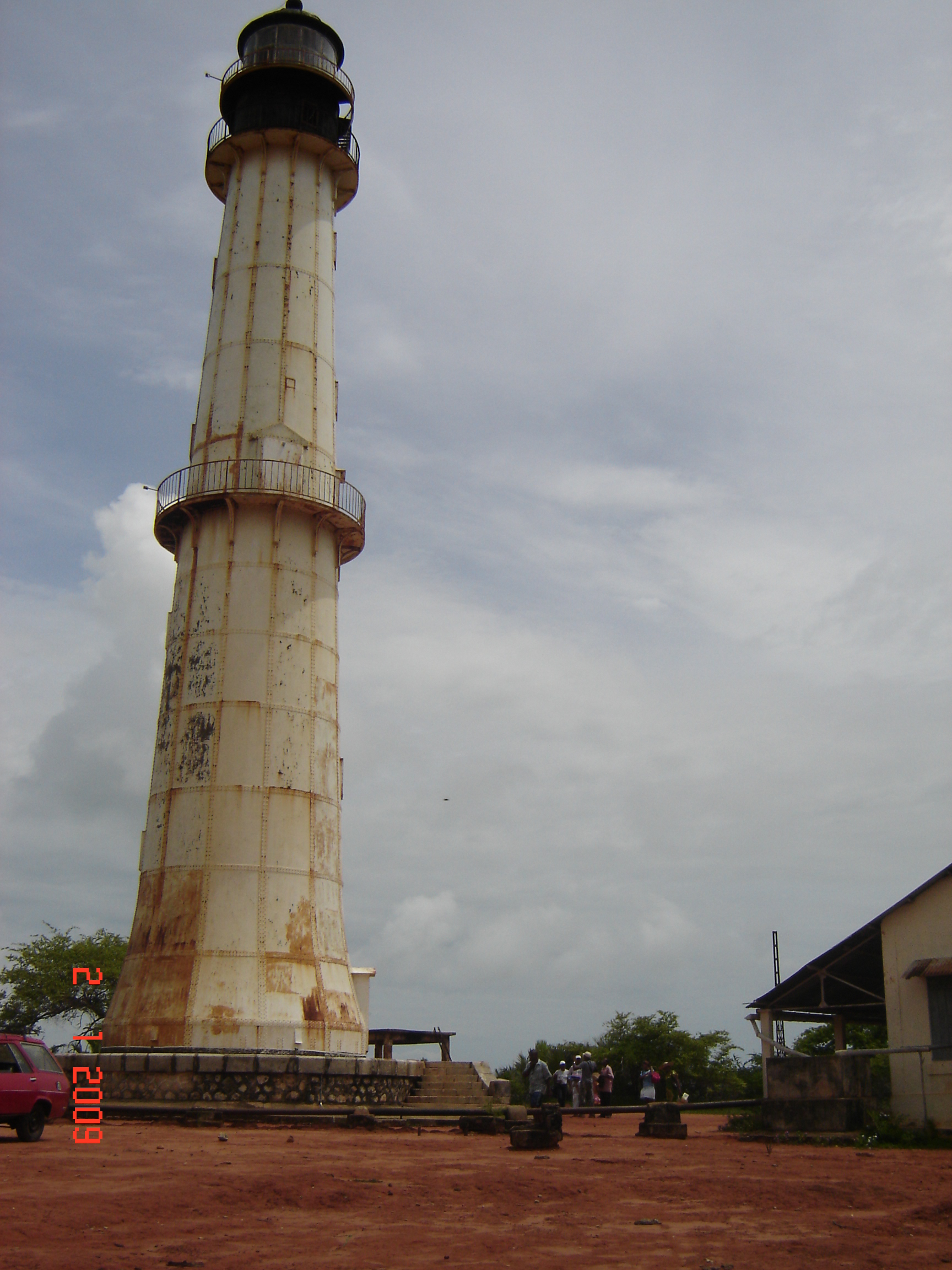
- Light House of Katsepy

- Location in Madagascar
- Coordinates: 15°46′S 46°14′E
- Country: Madagascar
- Region: Boeny
- District: Mitsinjo
- Elevation: 25 m (82 ft)

Population (2001)
  - Total: 10,000
- Time zone: UTC3 (EAT)
- Postal code: 417

Katsepy is a municipality in Madagascar. It belongs to the district of Mitsinjo, which is a part of Boeny Region. The population of the commune was estimated to be approximately 10,000 in 2001 commune census.

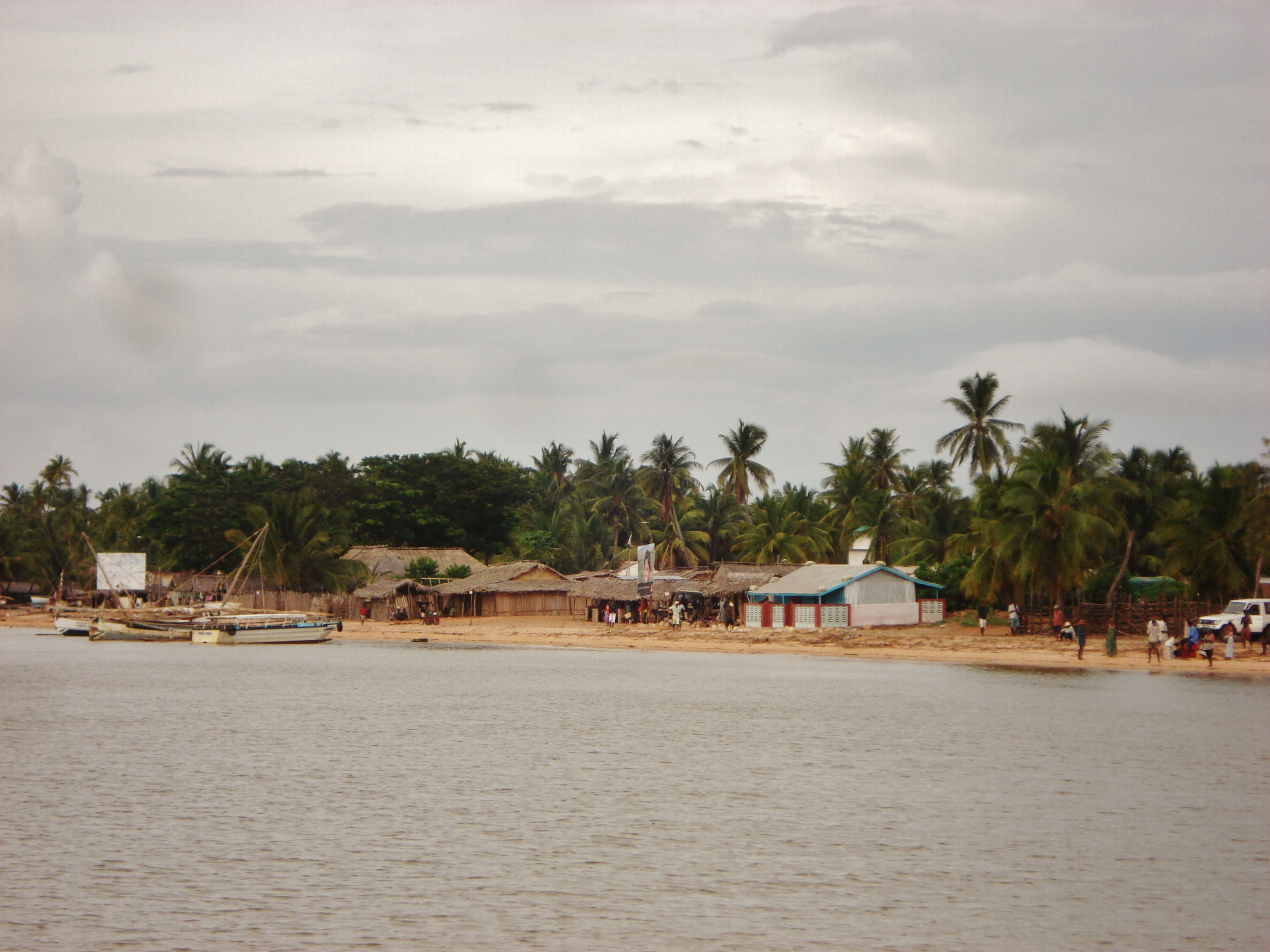
the Port of Katsepy

Katsepy has a maritime harbour. It is situated on the opposite side of the Betsiboka River from Mahajanga from where the town can be reached by a ferry. Only primary schooling is available. Farming and raising livestock provides employment for 40% and 30% of the working population. The most important crop is rice, while other important products are seeds of catechu and raffia palm. Services provide employment for 1% of the population. Additionally fishing employs 29% of the population.

Before 2006, a project for building an ethanol plant was started. During two years, all studies are realized. However, the unsettled political climate in Madagascar put an end to this project.

== Infrastructures ==
Katsepy has a small riverine harbour for the ferry across the Bombetoka Bay to Mahajanga. It is also the startpoint of the unpaved National road 19 to Soalala and Maintirano.

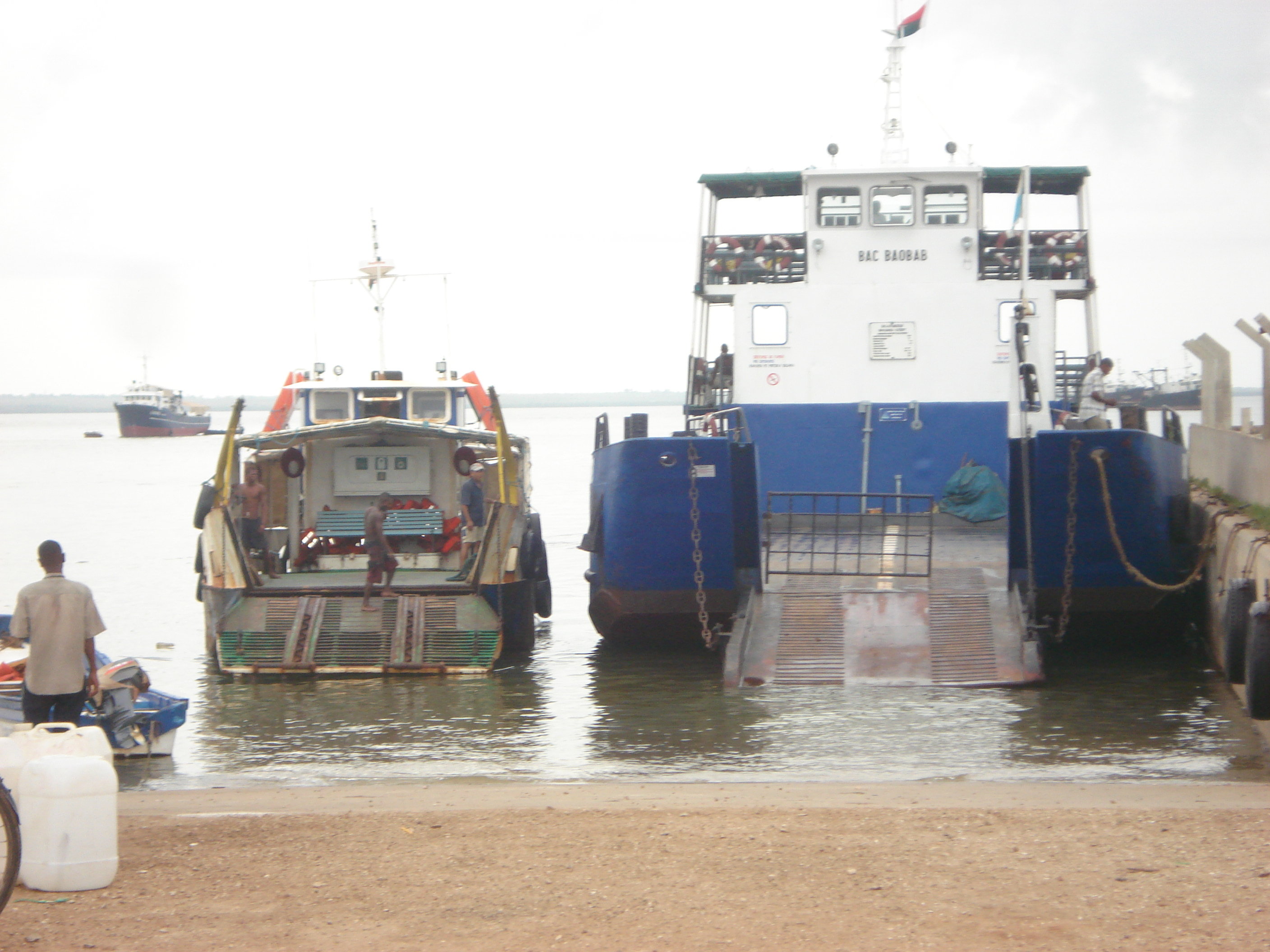
The ferry to Mahajanga

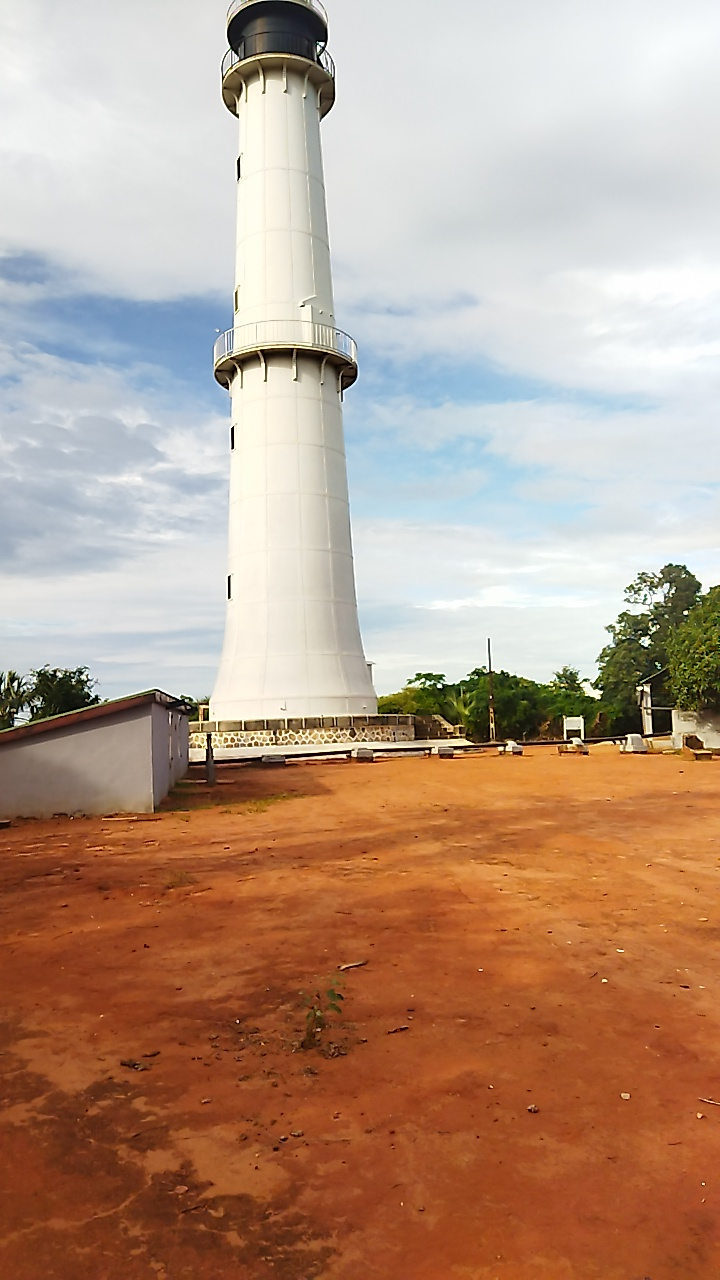
The lighthouse

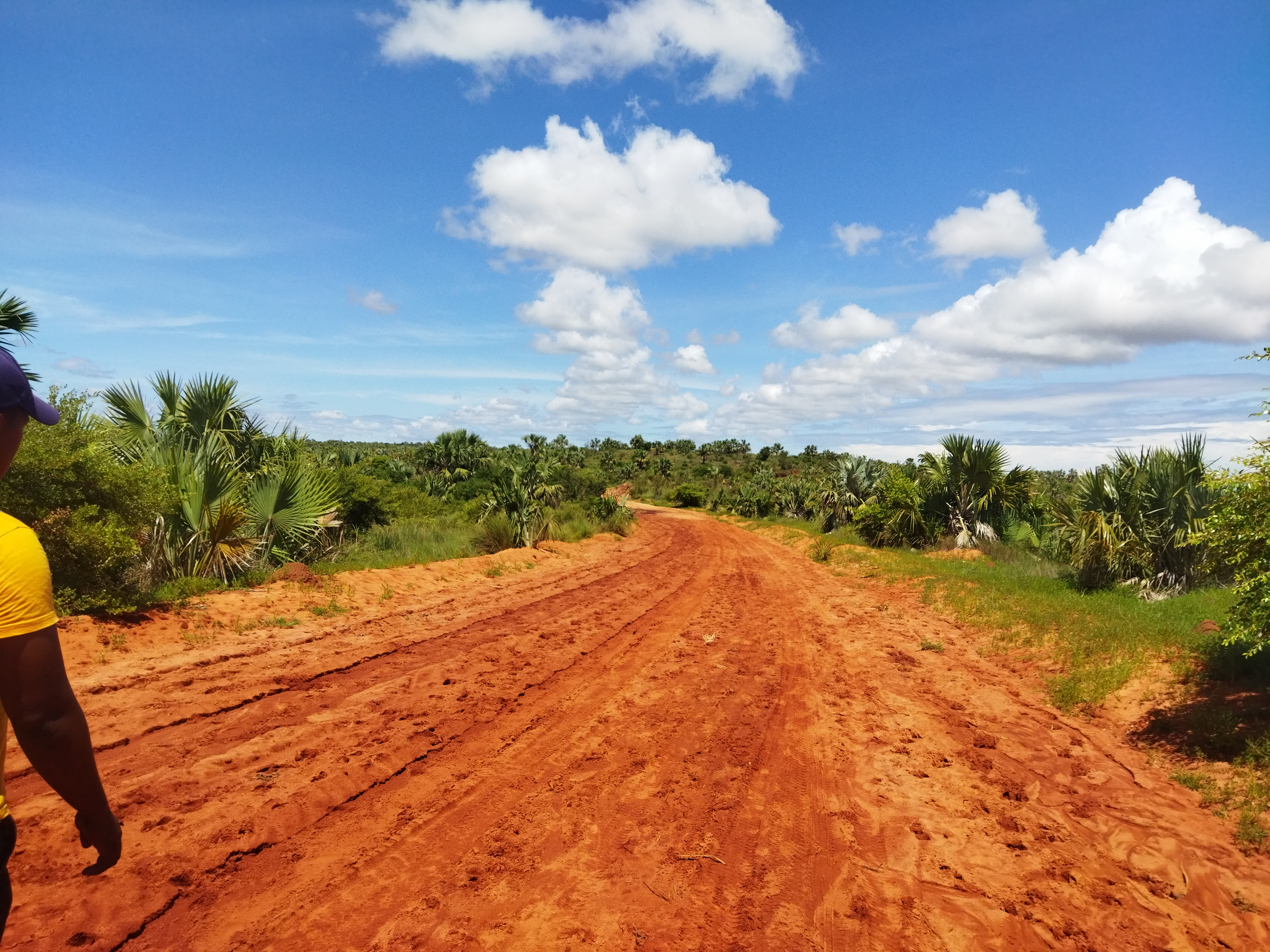
National road 19 T

== Light House ==
In Katsepy is found a light house that was constructed in 1901.
