= Ankaraobato, Marovoay =

Ankaraobato
- Location in Madagascar
- Coordinates: 16°21′S 46°11′E
- Country: Madagascar
- Region: Boeny
- District: Marovoay

Area
  - Total: 3.750 km^{2} (1.448 sq mi)
- Elevation: 56 m (184 ft)

Population (2019)Census
  - Total: 10,723
- Time zone: UTC3 (EAT)
- Postal code: 416

Ankaraobato is a rural municipality in Madagascar. It belongs to the district of Marovoay, which is a part of Boeny Region. The population of the commune was 10,723 in 2019.

Only primary schooling is available. The majority 60% of the population of the commune are farmers, while an additional 29% receives their livelihood from raising livestock. The most important crop is rice, while other important products are bananas and maize. Services provide employment for 1% of the population. Additionally fishing employs 10% of the population.

Twelve villages (fokontany) belong to this municipality:

- 01 – ANKARAOBATO - 00 km distance to the seat of the municipality
- 02 – BEANAMAMY/MALAO - 15 km
- 03 – SOAGOAGO - 12 km
- 04 – TSIANALOKA - 02 km
- 05 – ANTAMBARA/BEHANITRA - 02 km
- 06 – MORAFENO - 01 km
- 07 – MAVOZAZA - 18 km
- 08 – BEMAHOGO - 22 km
- 09 – ANDROTRA - 25 km
- 10 – BETSIKIRY - 45 km
- 11 – BEKORATSAKA - 40 km
- 12 – AMBATOFALIA - 62 km
