= Bemaharivo =

Behamarivo
- Location in Madagascar
- Coordinates: 16°8′S 46°24′E
- Country: Madagascar
- Region: Boeny
- District: Marovoay
- Elevation: 12 m (39 ft)

Population (2001)
  - Total: 9,000
- Time zone: UTC3 (EAT)

Bemaharivo is a town and commune (Malagasy: kaominina) in Madagascar. It belongs to the district of Marovoay, which is a part of Boeny Region in Mahajanga Province. The population of the commune was estimated to be approximately 9,000 in 2001 commune census.

Only primary schooling is available. The majority 55% of the population of the commune are farmers, while an additional 42% receives their livelihood from raising livestock. The most important crop is rice, while other important products are seeds of catechu and raffia palm. Services provide employment for 1% of the population. Additionally fishing employs 2% of the population.

== Geography ==
Location: Behamarivo is located in Madagascar, in the Boeny region, specifically in the Marovoay district.

Coordinates: 16°8′S, 46°24′E

Altitude: The town is situated at an altitude of 12 meters.

Time zone: UTC+3 (Madagascar time).
