= Berthe Rakotosamimanana =

Malagasy primatologist and paleontologist

- Born: 18 January 1938
- Died: 29 November 2005 (aged 67)
- Citizenship: Madagascar
- Education: University of Paris VII
- Occupations: Palaeontologist; Primatologist; Government Adviser
- Employer: University of Madagascar

Berthe Rakotosamimanana (born Berthe Rasoamialinivo, 18 January 1938, Andasibe; died on 29 November 2005, Antananarivo) was a primatologist and palaeontologist from Madagascar.

== Early life ==
Rakotosamimanana was born in Andasibe in Moramanga District on 18 January 1938. She studied at the University of Paris VII, Faculty of Sciences, for a degree in animal biology and anthropology. On her return in 1967 she was employed in the Geology Department at the University of Madagascar. She was married to the primatologist Philibert Rakotosamimanana.

== Career ==
Rakotosamimanana's work in the Department of Geology, from the first included supervising and teaching practical aspects of the subject. After seven years, she and her colleague Professor Henri Rakotoarivelo, set up the university's first palaeontology service in 1974.

In 1977 she was awarded a doctorate from University of Paris VII, entitled "La diversité anthropologique des isolats des hautes terres de l'Imerina (Madagascar). Confrontation du biologique et du social". This research examined diversity of people and species and their interactions in the Imerina Highlands.

In 1993, the palaeontology service became a full Department, mostly due to her initiatives, and she was head of it from 1995-1998. She created also created three new departments: Physical Anthropology, Nutritional Anthropology, Primatology and Evolutionary Biology. She was active in the department until 2003 and supervised doctoral students until her death.

Throughout her career Rakotosamimanana was a member of several professional bodies, including the "Groupe d'Etude et de Recherche sur les Primate de Madagascar" (GERP). Other organisations she was involved with include: Malagasy Academy, "Ranomafana National Park" project, IUCN / SSC Primate Survival Commission, the editorial Board of "International Journal of Primatology" and "Lemur News", Society of Human Biometrics, Society of Anthropology of Paris and the International Association of Anthropologists.

After the financial crisis in Madagascar in the 1980s, Rakotosamimanana was one of the architects to negotiate for foreign conservation NGOs to instigate programmes, which were to be truly beneficial to the development of the country. As Secretary-General of the 17th Congress of the International Primatological Society, Rakotosamimanana persuaded the government to provide significant funding for the university as preparation for the 1998 conference, which was hosted in Antananarivo. From 1977-83 she was Director of Scientific Research at the Malagasy Ministry for Education and Scientific Research. From 1986-92 she was a technical adviser to the same ministry. She was an active agent in the creation of Madagascar's National Environmental Action Plan.

== Legacy ==
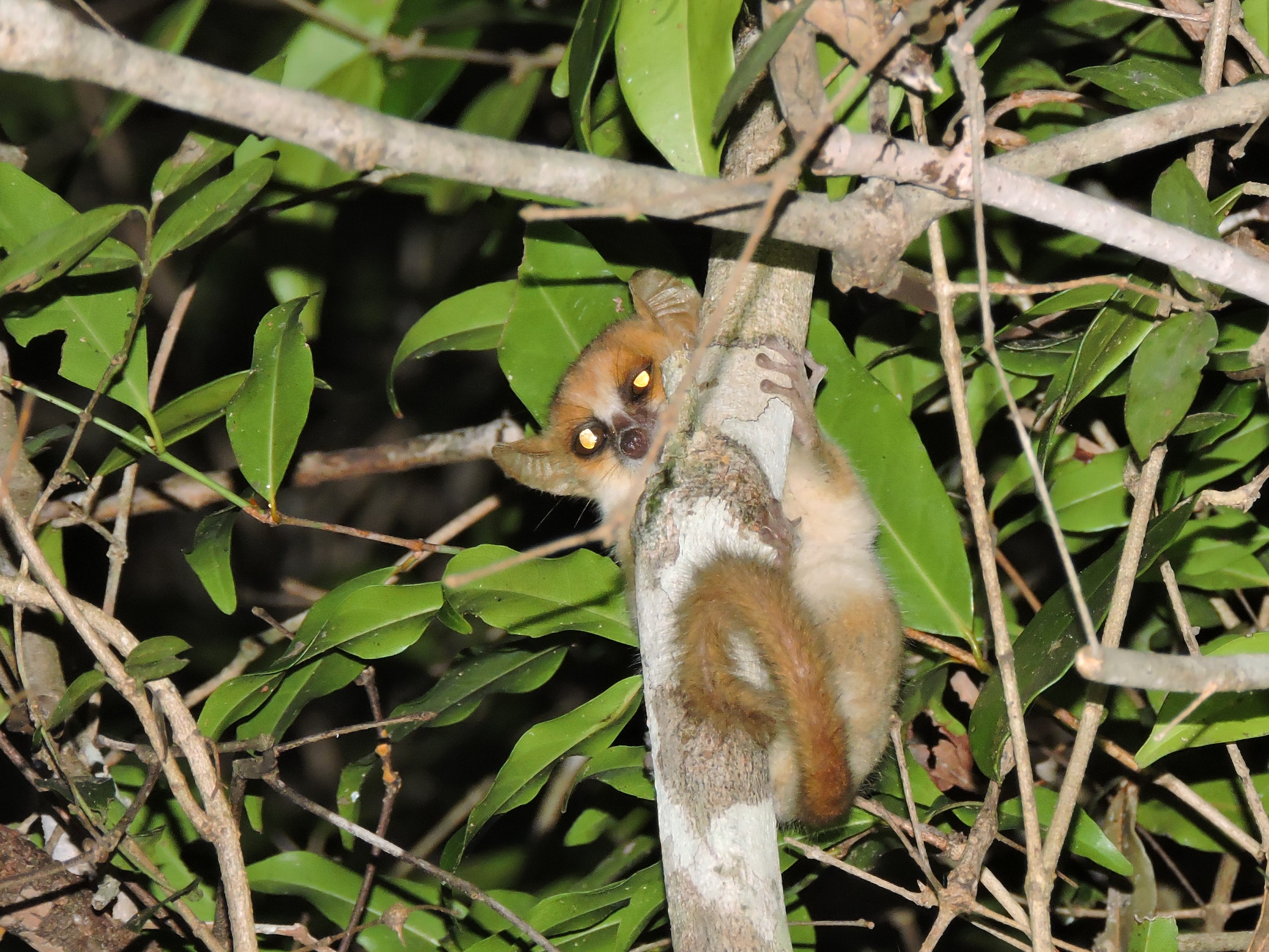
Microcebus berthae: Madame Berthe's Mouse Lemur

Rakotosamimanana's research focused on Madagascar's fossil and subfossil mammalian fauna.

=== Species named after Rakotosamimanana ===
==== Microcebus berthae ====
During Rakotosamimanana's lifetime, a newly described type of mouse lemur was named after her: Madame Berthe's mouse lemur. The authors of the first description paid tribute to their long-term coordination of research with the German Primate Centre in the Kirindy-Mitea National Park, the habitat of the new lemur.

Microcebus berthae is the world's smallest true primate and was discovered in 1992 in the forests of Menabe.

==== Coua berthae ====
In 1993, researchers named an extinct species of silk cuckoo, Coua berthae or Madame Berthe's Coua, after Rakotosamimanana.

=== First descriptions ===
Rakotosamimanana was part of the teams which first described:

- † Babakotia, a lemur genus that died out less than 1000 years ago.
- † Ambondro mahabo, an early mammal from the Malagasy Middle Jurassic.
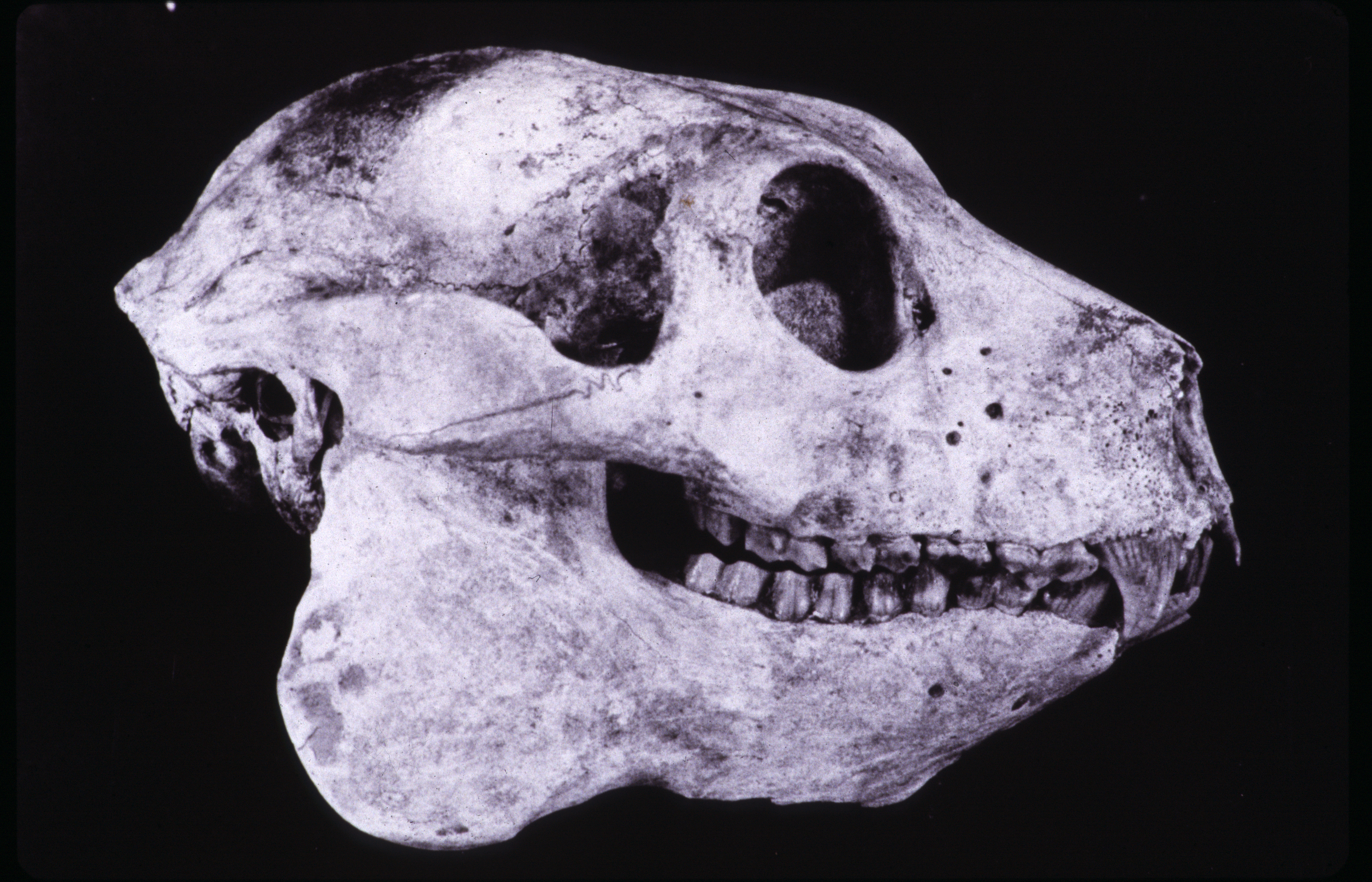
  Babakotia radofilai skull
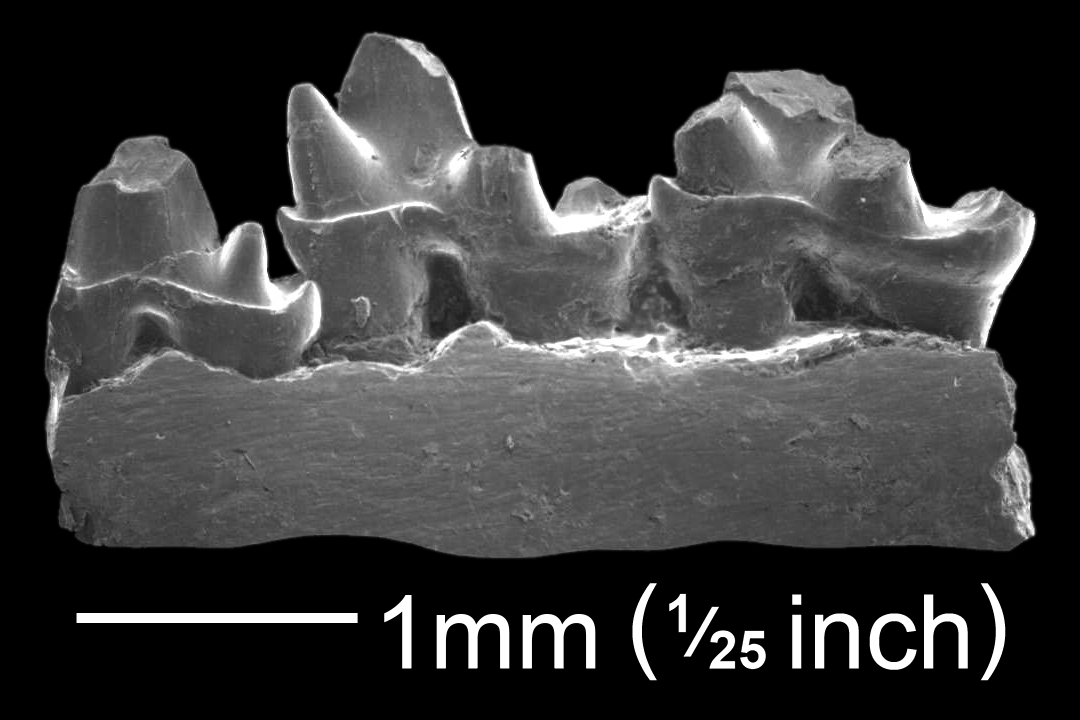
  Ambondro lingual teeth, from which both the monotypic genus and its single species A. mahabo were first described.

==== Palaeontology ====
Rakotosamimanana collaborated internationally on both palaeontological and primatological research projects and was a widely respected authority on primates from Madagascar, including their historical distributions across the island. She was part of a team which used DNA sequencing to demonstrate that all Madagascan lemurs descended from a common ancestor.

Madagascar's triassic fossil record is sparse and Rakotosamimanana was part of a team which identified new areas of deposits and as a result, was able to identify some of the island's earliest dinosaurs. These included two new species of non-mammalian eucynodonts.

==== Primatology ====
Rakotosamimanana had a keen research interest in Milne-Edwards' Sportive Lemur and studied the pair-usage of sleeping sites by them, and well as infanticide in their populations. She was part of a broader team which researched connections between genetic distance and geographic distribution in dwarf lemurs. Her work on Pachylemur insignis with colleagues demonstrated that it was closer to the genus Variecia than Lemur. She also studied lemur dermatoglyphs.
