= Antanambao Andranolava =

- Location in Madagascar
- Coordinates: 15°58′S 46°41′E
- Country: Madagascar
- Region: Boeny
- District: Marovoay
- Elevation: 45 m (148 ft)

Population (2001)
  - Total: 5,000
- Time zone: UTC3 (EAT)
- Postal code: 416

Antanambao Andranolava is a rural municipality in Madagascar. It belongs to the district of Marovoay, which is a part of Boeny Region. The population of the commune was estimated to be approximately 5,000 in 2001 commune census.

Only primary schooling is available. The majority 80% of the population of the commune are farmers, while an additional 8% receives their livelihood from raising livestock. The most important crop is rice, while other important products are maize and cassava. Services provide employment for 10% of the population. Additionally fishing employs 2% of the population.

== Roads ==
It is crossed by the National Road 4

== See also ==
- Berivotra Formation
