= Andranoboka =

- Location in Madagascar
- Coordinates: 15°38′S 46°53′E
- Country: Madagascar
- Region: Boeny
- District: Mahajanga II
- Elevation: 13 m (43 ft)

Population (2001)
  - Total: 4,000
- Time zone: UTC3 (EAT)

Andranoboka is a town and commune (Malagasy: kaominina) in Madagascar. It belongs to the district of Mahajanga II, which is a part of Boeny Region. The population of the commune was estimated to be approximately 4,000 in the 2001 commune census.

Andranoboka is served by a local airport and by riverine harbour. Only primary schooling is available. A majority of 50% of the population work in fishing while 48.5% are farmers. The most important crops are rice and sugarcane, while other important agricultural products are bananas and cassava. Services provide employment for 1.5% of the population.
