= Mitsinjo District =

- District
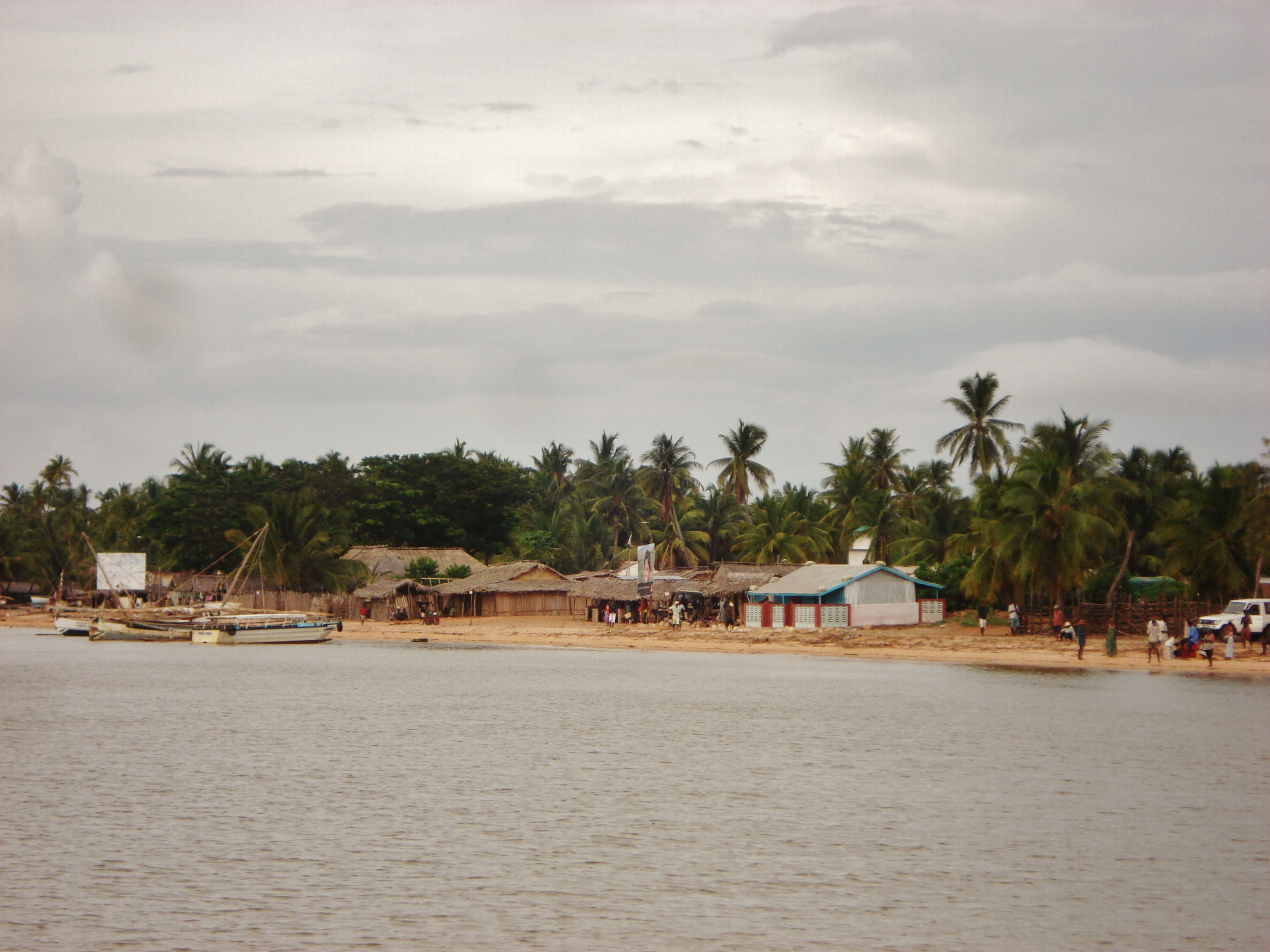
- Katsepy

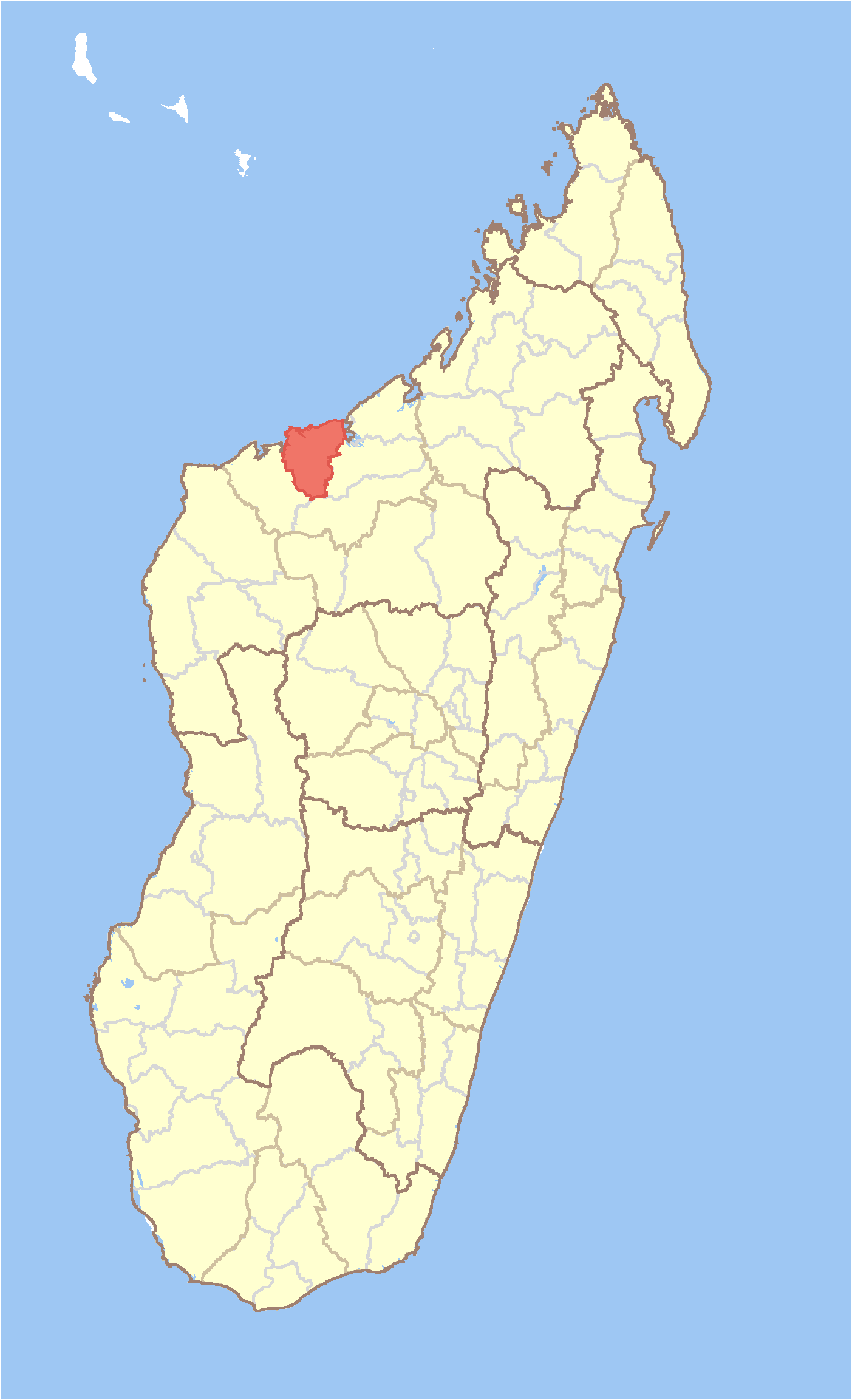
- Location in Madagascar
- Coordinates: 16°12′S 45°47′E
- Country: Madagascar
- Region: Boeny

Area
  - Total: 5,894 km^{2} (2,276 sq mi)

Population (2020)
  - Total: 87,202
  - Density: 14.80/km^{2} (38.32/sq mi)
  - Ethnicities: Sakalava
- Time zone: UTC3 (EAT)
- Postal code: 417

Mitsinjo is a district in western Madagascar. It is a part of Boeny Region and borders the districts of Marovoay in east, Ambato-Boeni in south and Soalala in west. The area is 5,894 km^{2} (2,276 sq mi) and the population was estimated to be 87,202 in 2020.

== Communes ==
The district is further divided into seven communes:

- Ambarimaninga
- Antongomena Bevary
- Antseza
- Bekipay
- Katsepy
- Matsakabanja
- Mitsinjo

== Personalities ==
- Ali Kamé - African champion in Decathlon 2012 is born in Namakia, Mitsinjo District.
