= Mahajanga II District =

Mahajanga II
- District
- Location within Madagascar
- Country: Madagascar

Mahajanga II is a district of Boeny in Madagascar.

== Communes ==
The district is further divided into nine communes:

- Ambalabe Befanjava
- Ambalakida
- Andranoboka
- Bekobay
- Belobaka
- Betsako
- Boanamary
- Mahajamba Usine
- Mariarano
