= Marovoay =

- Location in Madagascar
- Coordinates: 16°6′40″S 46°38′38″E
- Country: Madagascar
- Region: Boeny
- District: Marovoay
- Established: 1952

Area
  - Total: 102.77 km^{2} (39.68 sq mi)
- Elevation: 48 m (157 ft)

Population (2018 census)
  - Total: 39,290
  - Density: 382.3/km^{2} (990.2/sq mi)
  - Ethnicities: Sakalava Merina Betsileo
- Time zone: UTC3 (EAT)
- Postal code: 416

Marovoay (Malagasy pronunciation: [marʷˈvwaj]) is an urban municipality in north-western Madagascar. It belongs to the district of Marovoay, which is a part of Boeny Region. The population of the commune was 39,290 in the 2018 census.

== Origin of the name ==
Marovoay means "Full of crocodiles". In 1800 this locality was called Kelimaizina, later on it was named Fihaonana before it was renamed Marovoay, a name that was given by the queen Ravahiny.

It was the capital of the Sakalava Boina Kingdom, which still are predominant today but also Merina and Betsileo live in the town, mainly in the fokontany (villages) Antsatramira, Tsimahajao, Itandravaha, Soaniadanana, Mandrosoa and Ankingabe.

== Economy ==
The region of Marovoay is the 2nd largest rice producing area in Madagascar. The majority 60% of the population of the commune are farmers, while an additional 24% receives their livelihood from raising livestock. The most important crop is rice, while other important products are cassava and sweet potatoes. Industry and services provide employment for 2% and 10% of the population, respectively. Additionally fishing employs 4% of the population.

== Geography ==
Marovoay has a riverine harbour on the Betsiboka River and is situated at 94 km from Mahajanga and 41 km from the Ankarafantsika National Park.

== Rivers ==
The main rivers are the Betsiboka River and the Karambo river.

== Roads ==
The town is situated at the National road 8b that is in a bad state of conversation. Furthermore it is situated only 8 km from the National road 4 from Mahajanga to Antananarivo.

In addition to primary schooling the town offers secondarmy education at both junior and senior levels. The town provides access to hospital services to its citizens.
