= Boeny =

Coordinates: 15°43′12″S 46°19′12″E

Boeny Region
- Region
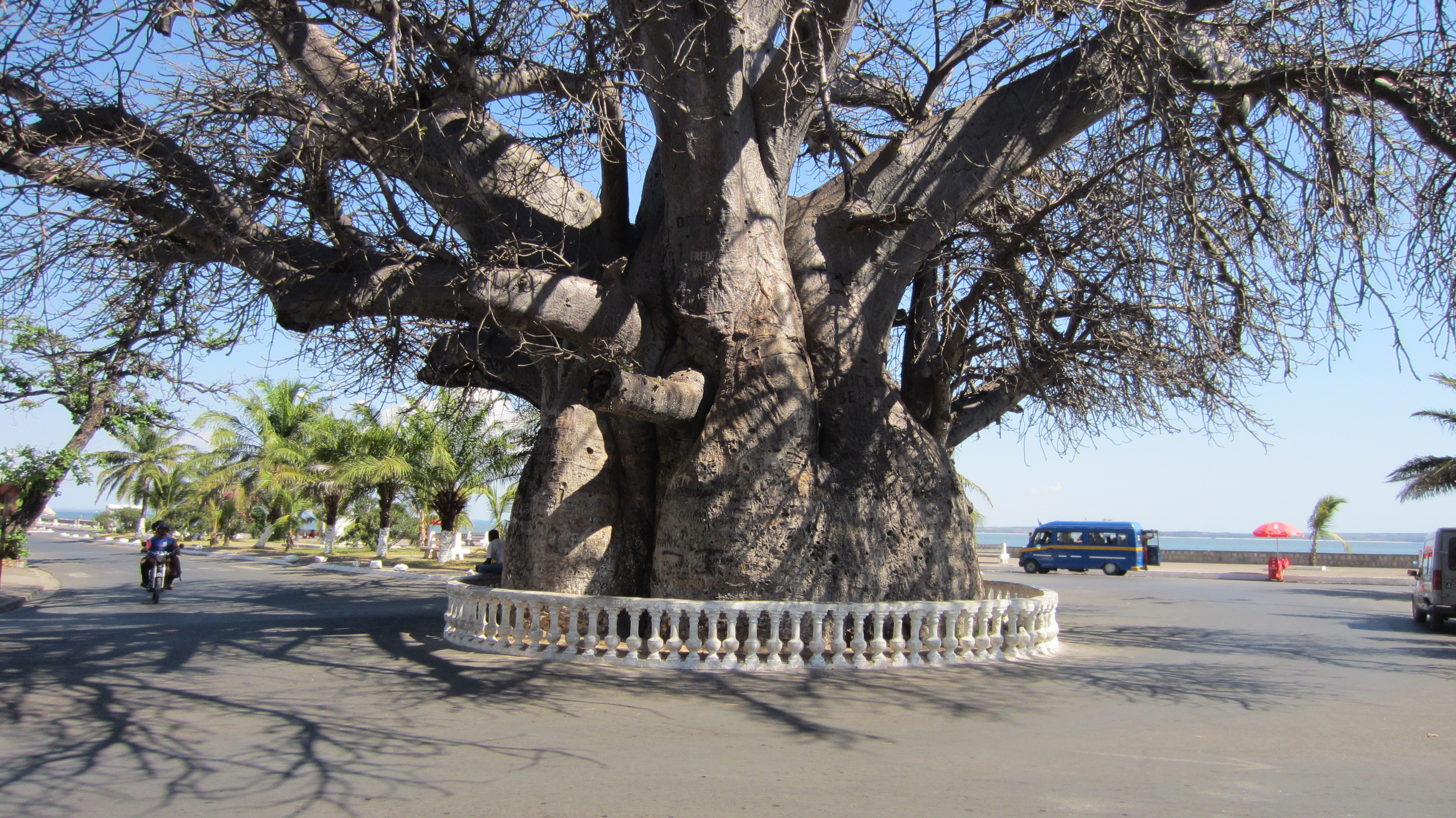
- Baobab tree in Mahajanga

- Location in Madagascar
- Country: Madagascar
- Capital: Mahajanga

Government
  - Governor: Mokhtar Andriantomanga

Area
  - Total: 31,046 km^{2} (11,987 sq mi)

Population (2018)
  - Total: 931,171
  - Density: 29.993/km^{2} (77.682/sq mi)
- Time zone: UTC3 (EAT)
- HDI (2018): 0.525 low · 10th of 22

Boeny is a region in northwestern Madagascar. It borders Sofia Region to the northeast, Betsiboka to the south and Melaky to the southwest. The capital of the region is Mahajanga, and the population was 931,171 in 2018. The area of Boeny is 31,046 km^{2} (11,987 sq mi).

== Administrative divisions ==
Boeny Region is divided into six districts, which are sub-divided into 43 communes.

- Ambato-Boeni District - 11 communes
- Mahajanga I District - 1 commune
- Mahajanga II District - 9 communes
- Marovoay District - 12 communes
- Mitsinjo District - 7 communes
- Soalala District - 3 communes

== Transport ==
=== Airports ===
- Mahajanga Airport
- Soalala Airport

== Protected areas ==
- Mahavavy-Kinkony Wetland Complex
- Bombetoka Beloboka New Protected Area
- Antrema New Protected Area
- Ankarafantsika National Park
- Baie de Baly National Park
- Tsingy de Namoroka National Park
- Bongolava Forest Corridor

Kasijy Special Reserve

== See also ==
- Boina Kingdom
