= Route nationale 33 (Madagascar) =

Road in Madagascar

Location
- Country: Madagascar

Highway system
- Roads in Madagascar

Route nationale 33 (RN 33) is a secondary highway in Madagascar from Morarano Chrome to Andriamena. It crosses the regions of Alaotra-Mangoro and Betsiboka Region.

== Selected locations on route ==
(east to west)

- Morarano Chrome (junction with RN 3a)
- Ambakireny
- Brieville (84 km)
- Andriamena

Only the part between Morarano Chrome and Brieville is paved.

== See also ==
- List of roads in Madagascar
- Transport in Madagascar
