= Kandreho District =

Kandreho (district)
- Location in Madagascar
- Coordinates: 17°29′S 46°06′E
- Country: Madagascar
- Region: Betsiboka
- District: Kandreho

Area
  - Total: 6,524 km^{2} (2,519 sq mi)

Population (2020)Estimate
  - Total: 27,997
  - Density: 4.291/km^{2} (11.11/sq mi)
- Time zone: UTC3 (EAT)
- Postal code: 411

Kandreho is a district of Betsiboka in Madagascar. It is situated at 144 km from Maevatanana.

== Communes ==
The district is further divided into seven municipalities:

- Ambaliha
- Andasibe
- Antanimbaribe
- Behazomaty
- Betaimboay
- Kandreho
- Mahatsinjo, Maevatanana

== Rivers ==
- Mahavavy Sud River, Kandreho River, Mahakamba, Namakia, Bekoratsaka River and the Menavava river.

== See also ==
- Kandreho Formation
- Kasijy Reserve
