= Morafeno =

Morafeno is the name of several municipalities in Madagascar:

- Morafeno, Befandriana-Nord, a municipality in Befandriana-Nord District, Sofia Region.
- Morafeno, Sambava, a municipality in Sambava District, Sava Region.
- Morafeno, Maevatanana, a municipality in Maevatanana District, Betsiboka Region.
- Morafeno, Maroantsetra, a municipality in Maroantsetra (district), Analanjirofo region.
- Morafeno, Ambohimahasoa, a municipality in the Ambohimahasoa District, Haute Matsiatra

== Public Buildings ==
- CHU Morafeno - the university hospital of Toamasina, Madagascar.
