= Beanana, Maevatanana =

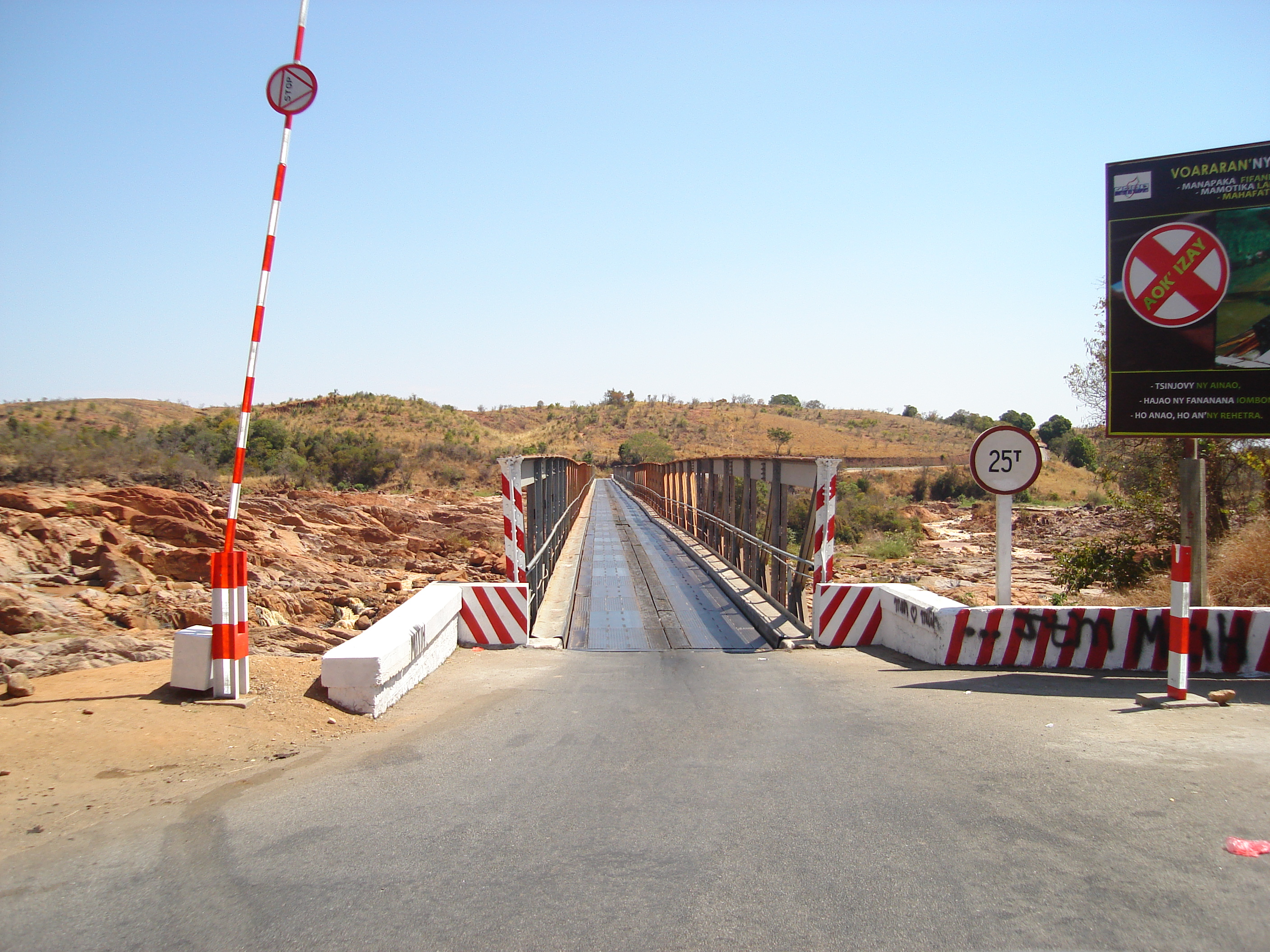
- Betsiboka Bridge, near Maevatanana

- Location in Madagascar
- Coordinates: 17°03′S 46°49′E
- Country: Madagascar
- Region: Betsiboka
- District: Maevatanana
- Time zone: UTC3 (EAT)
- Postal code: 412
- Climate: Aw

Beanana is a rural municipality in Madagascar. The city is in the central-north part of the island and is connected by the national road RN 4 to Antananarivo and Mahajanga. This municipality belongs to the district of Maevatanana, which is a part of Betsiboka Region.

== Infrastructure ==
- Route Nationale 4 from Antananarivo, Maevatanana to Mahajanga.

== Rivers ==
Beanana lies at the Ikopa River and the Betsiboka River.

== Mining ==
There are important gold mining operations near the town.
