= Ambolotarakely =

- Location in Madagascar
- Coordinates: 18°16′S 47°24′E
- Country: Madagascar
- Region: Analamanga
- District: Ankazobe

Area
  - Total: 277 km^{2} (107 sq mi)
- Elevation: 971 m (3,186 ft)

Population (2019)Census
  - Total: 10,560
- Time zone: UTC3 (EAT)
- postal code: 108

Ambolotarakely is a municipality in Analamanga Region, in the Central Highlands of Madagascar, located in the North from the capital of Antananarivo. Ambolotarakely is situated in Ankazobe, Antananarivo, Madagascar, its geographical coordinates are 18° 16' 0" South, 47° 24' 0" East.

Nearby is situated the Ambohitantely Reserve. The unique feature identifier is: 198572 and the unique name identifier is:300096.

== Places near Ambolotarakely ==
Cities, towns and places near Ambolotarakely include:

- Antananarivo
- Toamasina
- Nacala
- Nampula
- Antsahamalaza
- Ankofa
- Fenoarivo
- Vohibolo.
