= Behazomaty =

- Location in Madagascar
- Coordinates: 17°23′S 46°19′E
- Country: Madagascar
- Region: Betsiboka
- District: Kandreho

Government

Area
  - Total: 900 km^{2} (350 sq mi)

Population (2018)
  - Total: 6,974
- Time zone: UTC3 (EAT)
- Postal code: 411

Behazomaty is a rural commune in Madagascar. It belongs to the district of Kandreho, which is a part of Betsiboka. It is situated at 50km East from Kandreho, the capital of the district. It is situated at the Menavava river.
