= Maevatanana (disambiguation) =

Maevatanana may refer to several municipalities in Madagascar:

- Maevatanana, a city in Betsiboka, Madagascar
- Maevatanana II, the rural area around Maevatanana, Betsiboka
- Maevatanana, Diana, a rural municipality in Diana Region
