= Sakoamadinika =

- Location in Madagascar
- Coordinates: 17°12′00″S 48°03′10″E
- Country: Madagascar
- Region: Betsiboka
- District: Tsaratanana
- Established: 2015
- Time zone: UTC3 (EAT)
- Postal code: 421

Sakoamadinika is a rural municipality in Madagascar. It belongs to the district of Tsaratanana, which is a part of Betsiboka Region.
