= Berivotra =

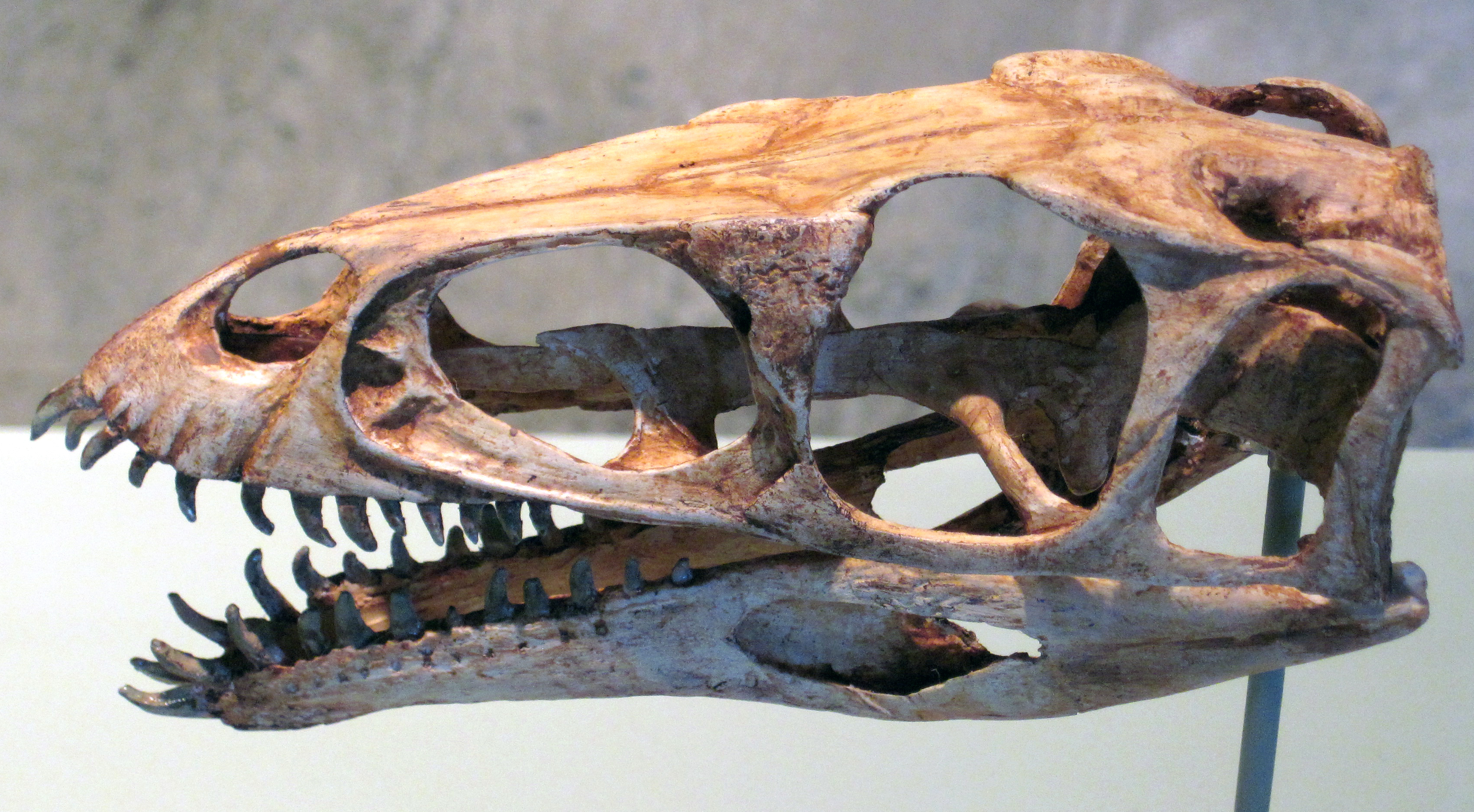
- Masiakasaurus knopfleri skull found at Berivotra

- Location in Madagascar
- Coordinates: 16°46′S 47°2′E
- Country: Madagascar
- Region: Betsiboka
- District: Maevatanana

Population (2018)Census
  - Total: 7,384
  - Ethnicities: Sakalava
- Time zone: UTC3 (EAT)
- Postal code: 412

Berivotra is a rural municipality in Madagascar. It belongs to the district of Maevatanana, which is a part of Betsiboka Region. The population of the municipality was 14,675 in 2018.

== Infrastructure ==
It is situated on the Route Nationale 4 from Antananarivo to Mahajanga (230 km). It is found at 32 km from 32 km Maevatanana.

== Economy ==
Principal activity is gold digging in the Ikalamilotra river.
