= Ankazobe District =

Ankazobe
- District
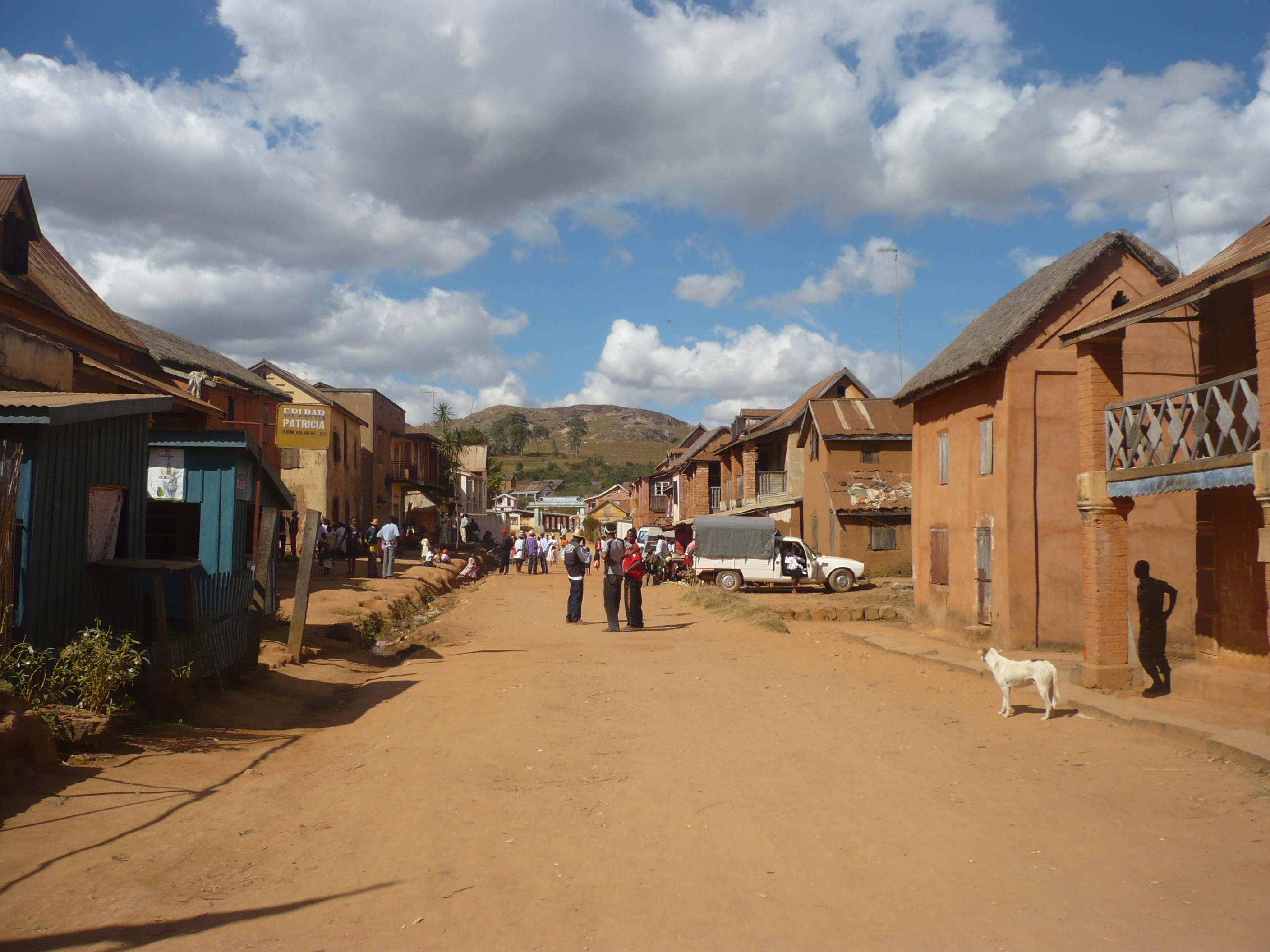
- Ankazobe

- Location within Madagascar
- Coordinates: 18°31′S 47°11′E
- Country: Madagascar
- Region: Analamanga

Area
  - Total: 2,932 sq mi (7,593 km^{2})

Population (2018)
  - Total: 226,258
- Postal code: 108

Ankazobe is a district of Analamanga in Madagascar.

== Communes ==
The district is further divided into 15 communes:

- Ambohitromby
- Ambolotarakely
- Andranomiely Sud
- Ankazobe
- Antakavana
- Antotohazo
- Fiadanana
- Fihaonana
- Kiangara
- Mahavelona
- Mangasoavina
- Marondry
- Miantso
- Talata-Angavo
- Tsaramasoandro

== Infrastructure ==
- Route Nationale 4 from Antananarivo to Mahajanga.
- Route d'Interet Provinciale 40T (RIP 40T) from the RN 4/Ankazobe to Talata-Angavo

== Nature reserves ==
The Ambohitantely Special Reserve is situated at 30 km in the North-East of the town of Ankazobe. It is situated on the territory of the municipalities of Antakavana and Ambolotarakely.

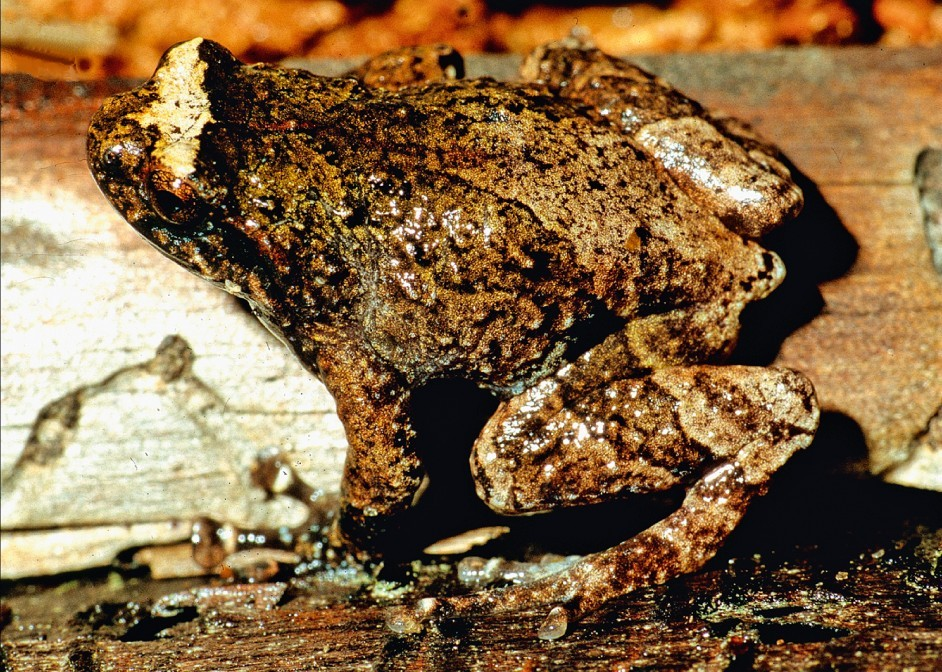
Anodonthyla vallani, a threatened frog species

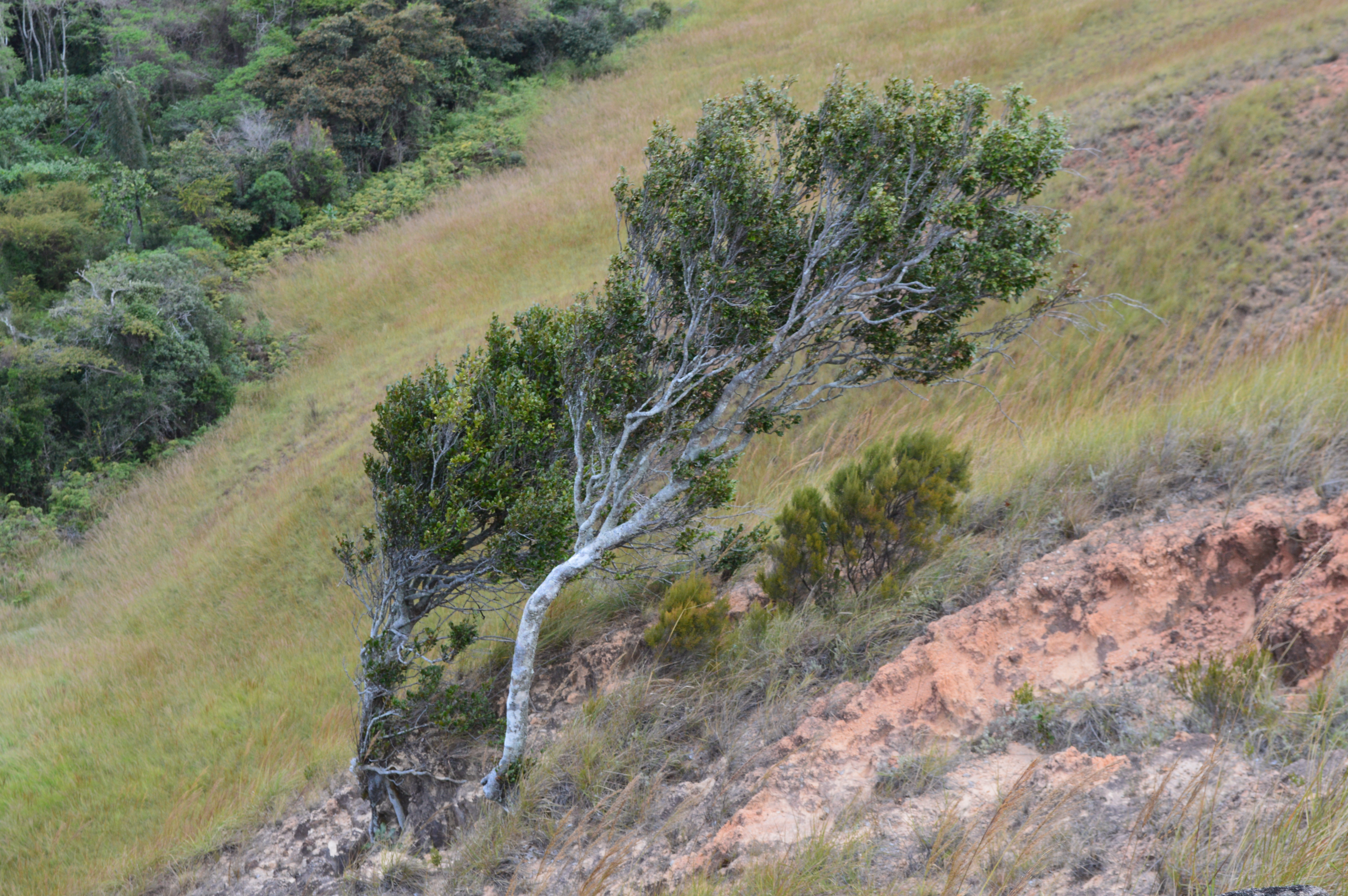
Schizolaena tampoketsana a species native to Ankazobe

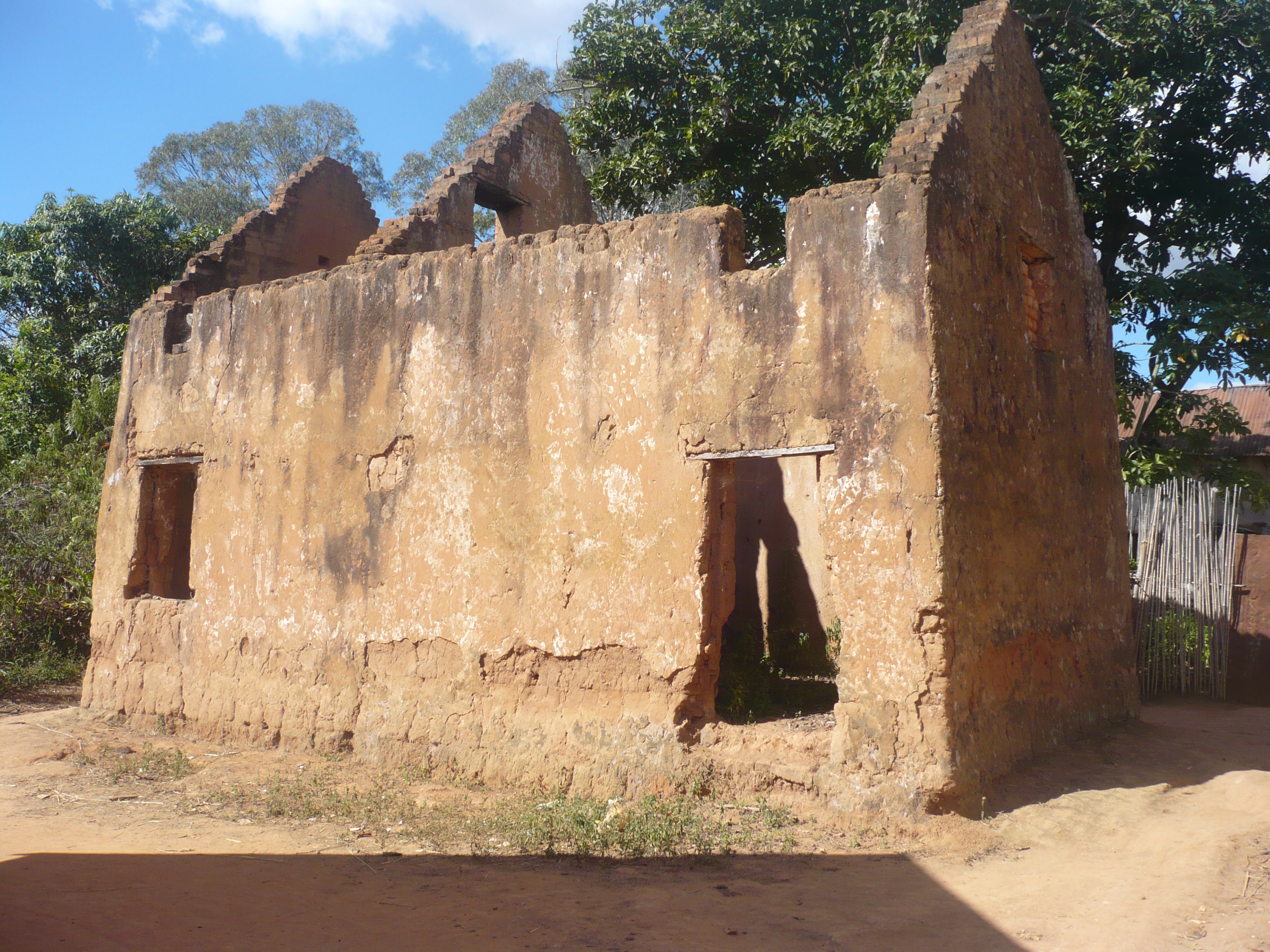
Ankazobe

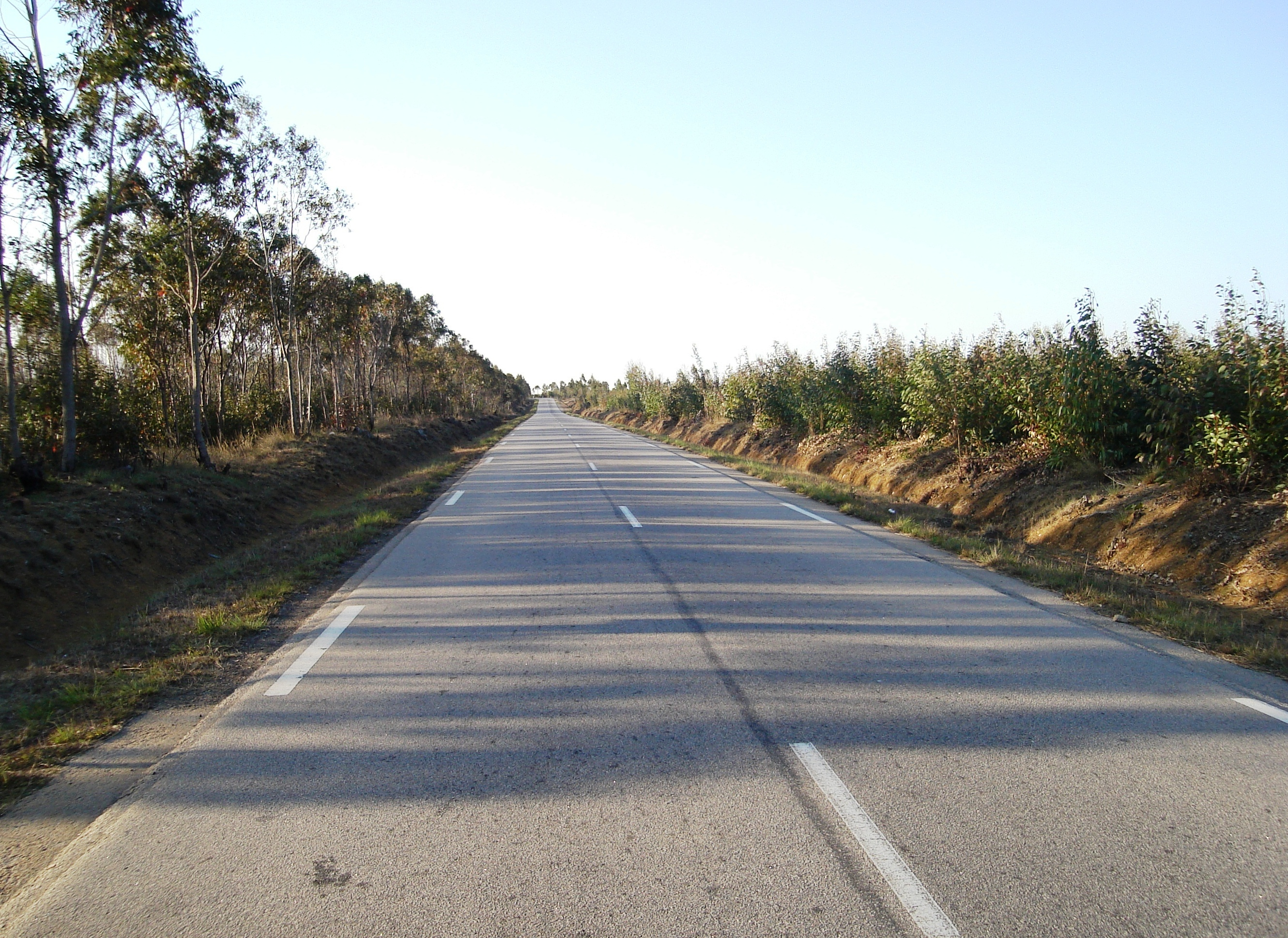
National road 4
