= Andasibe, Kandreho =

Andasibe
- Location in Madagascar
- Coordinates: 17°39′S 46°14′E
- Country: Madagascar
- Region: Betsiboka
- District: Kandreho

Area
  - Land: 975 km^{2} (376 sq mi)

Population (2018)
  - Total: 487
- Time zone: UTC3 (EAT)
- Postal code: 411

Andasibe is a rural municipality in Madagascar. It belongs to the district of Kandreho, which is a part of Betsiboka. The population of the commune was estimated to be approximately 487 in 2018, including 393 men and 94 woman.

== Roads ==
The unpaved provincial road RIP 107 connects to Maevatanana and Kandreho.
