= Maevatanana II =

Maevatanana II Suberbieville
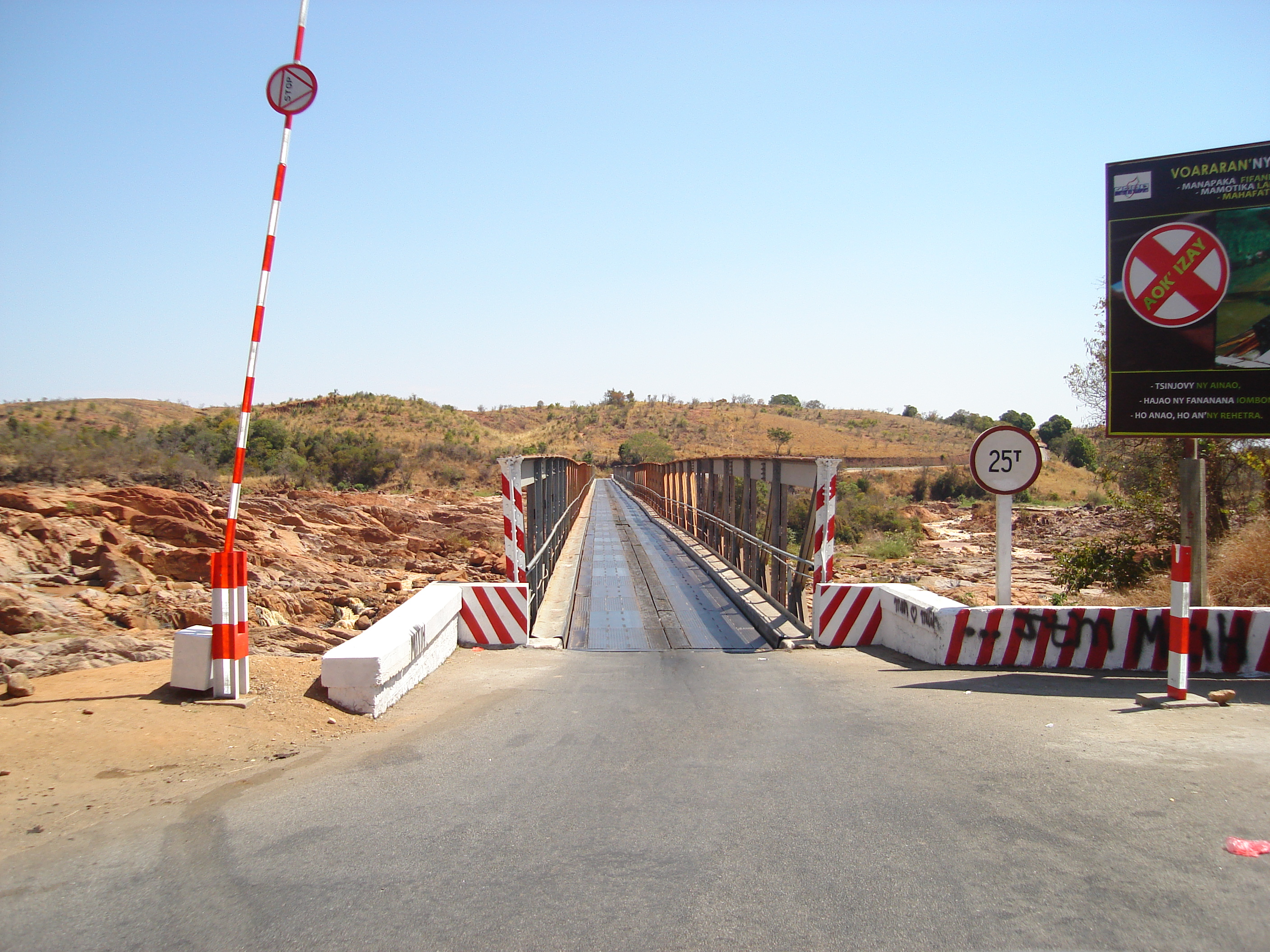
- Betsiboka Bridge, near Maevatanana

- Location in Madagascar
- Coordinates: 16°57′S 46°50′E
- Country: Madagascar
- Region: Betsiboka
- District: Maevatanana
- Elevation: 70 m (230 ft)

Population (2018 census)
  - Total: 16,000
- Time zone: UTC3 (EAT)
- Postal code: 412
- Climate: Aw

Maevatanana II is a rural municipality in Madagascar. It covers the villages around the town of Maevatanana and belongs to the district of Maevatanana, which is a part of Betsiboka Region. The population of the commune was estimated to be approximately 16,000 in 2001 commune census.

Maevatanana II has a riverine harbour. Only primary schooling is available. The majority 80% of the population of the commune are farmers, while an additional 15% receives their livelihood from raising livestock. The most important crops are rice and tobacco, while other important agricultural products are peanuts and cassava. Additionally fishing employs 5% of the population.

== Infrastructure ==
- Route Nationale 4 from Antananarivo (329 km) to Mahajanga (249 km).

== Rivers ==
Maevatanana lies between the Ikopa River & the Betsiboka River. Secondary rivers are the Menavava, Mandrava, Andriantoany, Nandronjia and the Isinko river.

== Mining ==
There are important gold mining operations near the town where 20 kgs of gold are extracted weekly.
