= Isinko =

- Location in Madagascar
- Coordinates: 17°05′00″S 47°14′10″E
- Country: Madagascar
- Region: Betsiboka
- District: Tsaratanana
- Established: 2015

Government
  - Mayor: Gilbert Telo
- Time zone: UTC3 (EAT)
- Postal code: 421

Isinko is a rural municipality in Madagascar. It belongs to the district of Tsaratanana, which is a part of Betsiboka Region. It is situated at the Isinko river.
