= Betaimboay =

- Location in Madagascar
- Coordinates: 17°46′S 46°08′E
- Country: Madagascar
- Region: Betsiboka
- District: Kandreho

Government
  - Mayor: Mr Razafimahatratra
- Time zone: UTC3 (EAT)
- Postal code: 411

Betaimboay is a municipality in western Madagascar in Betsiboka Region approximately 200 kilometres (120 mi) north-west of the capital Antananarivo.
