= Mahavelona (disambiguation) =

Mahavelona can stand for:

- Mahavelona, Ankazobe - a commune in Analamanga, Madagascar.
- Mahavelona, Soavinandriana - a commune in Itasy, Madagascar.
- Mahavelona - also called: Foulpointe. A commune in Atsinanana, Madagascar
