= Betrandraka =

- Location in Madagascar
- Coordinates: 17°2′S 47°33′E
- Country: Madagascar
- Region: Betsiboka
- District: Tsaratanana
- Elevation: 481 m (1,578 ft)

Population (2001)
  - Total: 10,000
- Time zone: UTC3 (EAT)

Betrandraka is a town and commune (Malagasy: kaominina) in Madagascar. It belongs to the district of Tsaratanana, which is a part of Betsiboka Region. The population of the commune was estimated to be approximately 10,000 in 2001 commune census. The Mahajamba River flows to the northeast.

Only primary schooling is available. The majority 59% of the population of the commune are farmers, while an additional 40% receives their livelihood from raising livestock. The most important crop is rice, while other important products are maize and cassava. Services provide employment for 1% of the population.
