= Marondry =

- Location in Madagascar
- Coordinates: 18°25′S 47°00′E
- Country: Madagascar
- Region: Analamanga
- District: Ankazobe

Area
  - Land: 344 km^{2} (133 sq mi)

Population (2018)
  - Total: 10,110
- Time zone: UTC3 (EAT)
- Postal code: 108

Marondry is a village in Analamanga Region, in the Central Highlands of Madagascar, located north-west from the capital of Antananarivo. The population was 10,110 in 2018.

The municipality was created in 2003. Before it belonged to the municipality of Antotohazo.
