= Ambalajia =

- Location in Madagascar
- Coordinates: 17°29′S 46°7′E
- Country: Madagascar
- Region: Betsiboka
- District: Maevatanana
- Elevation: 232 m (761 ft)

Population (2001)
  - Total: 9,000
- Time zone: UTC3 (EAT)

Ambalajia is a town and commune (Malagasy: kaominina) in Madagascar. It belongs to the district of Maevatanana, which is a part of Betsiboka Region. The population of the commune was estimated to be approximately 9,000 in 2001 commune census.

Only primary schooling is available. The majority 94% of the population of the commune are farmers, while an additional 4% receives their livelihood from raising livestock. The most important crops are rice and peanuts; also cowpeas are an important agricultural product. Additionally fishing employs 2% of the population.
