= Tsararano =

Tsararano may refer to:

- Tsararano, Marovoay, Madagascar
- Tsararano, Maevatanana, Madagascar
- Tsararano, Mayotte, France
