= Charles Ralazasoa =

Malagasy politician

Charles Ralazasoa is a Malagasy politician. A member of the National Assembly of Madagascar, he was elected as a member of the Tiako i Madagasikara party; he represents the constituency of Tsaratanana.
