= Euphorbia ankazobensis =

Conservation status
- Critically Endangered (IUCN 3.1)

Scientific classification
- Kingdom: Plantae
- Clade: Tracheophytes
- Clade: Angiosperms
- Clade: Eudicots
- Clade: Rosids
- Order: Malpighiales
- Family: Euphorbiaceae
- Genus: Euphorbia
- Species: E. ankazobensis

Binomial name
- Euphorbia ankazobensis Rauh & Hoftätter

Species of flowering plant

Euphorbia ankazobensis is a species of plant in the family Euphorbiaceae. It is endemic to Madagascar.

It is known from one single collection in the Ankazobe area of Madagascar's Central Highlands. Its natural habitat is in remnant montane forest. It is threatened by habitat loss, and its natural habitat is extremely fragmented and degraded by human activity. It is assessed as critically endangered.

Trade in this species is regulated under Appendix II of CITES.
