= Antsiafabositra =

- Location in Madagascar
- Coordinates: 17°18′S 46°57′E
- Country: Madagascar
- Region: Betsiboka
- District: Maevatanana
- Elevation: 388 m (1,273 ft)

Population (2001)
  - Total: 8,000
- Time zone: UTC3 (EAT)

Antsiafabositra is a town and commune (Malagasy: kaominina) in central Madagascar approximately 170 kilometres north-west of the capital Antananarivo. It belongs to the district of Maevatanana, which is a part of Betsiboka Region. The population of the commune was estimated to be approximately 8,000 in 2001 commune census.

Primary and junior level secondary education are available in town. The majority 70% of the population of the commune are farmers, while an additional 15% receives their livelihood from raising livestock. The most important crop is rice, while other important products are bananas, cassava and raffia palm. Services provide employment for 5% of the population. Additionally fishing employs 10% of the population.
