= Maurisson Randrianarivony =

Malagasy politician

Maurisson Randrianarivony is a Malagasy politician. A member of the National Assembly of Madagascar, he was elected as an independent; he represents the constituency of Maevatanana.
