= Mangabe, Maevatanana =

Mangabe
- Location in Madagascar
- Coordinates: 16°43′S 46°49′E
- Country: Madagascar
- Region: Betsiboka
- District: Maevatanana
- Elevation: 27 m (89 ft)

Population (2001)
  - Total: 16,000
- Time zone: UTC3 (EAT)

Mangabe is a town and commune (Malagasy: kaominina) in Madagascar. It belongs to the district of Maevatanana, which is a part of Betsiboka Region. The population of the commune was estimated to be approximately 16,000 in 2001 commune census.

Primary and junior level secondary education are available in town. The majority 65% of the population of the commune are farmers, while an additional 15% receives their livelihood from raising livestock. The most important crop is onions, while other important products are maize and rice. Additionally fishing employs 20% of the population.

There are 8 Fokontany within the rural commune of Mangabe: Ambinanikely, Anosimiadana, Antanambao, Kamotro, Kapingo, Madirobe, Merimandroso, Mangabe.
