= Andasibe (disambiguation) =

Andasibe is a commune in Mananara Nord, Analanjirofo, Madagascar.

Andasibe may also refer to:

- Andasibe, Kandreho, a commune in Betsiboka, Madagascar
- Andasibe, Moramanga, a commune in Alaotra-Mangoro, Madagascar
  - Andasibe-Mantadia National Park, a protected area near Andasibe, Moramanga
- Andasibe, Vavatenina, a commune in Analanjirofo, Madagascar
