= Antanimbaribe =

- Location in Madagascar
- Coordinates: 17°20′S 46°13′E
- Country: Madagascar
- Region: Betsiboka
- District: Kandreho

Area
  - Total: 1,125 km^{2} (434 sq mi)
- Elevation: 499 m (1,637 ft)

Population (2018)
  - Total: 3,926
- Time zone: UTC3 (EAT)
- Postal code: 411

Antanimbaribe is a rural commune in Madagascar. It belongs to the northern part of the district of Kandreho, which is a part of Betsiboka. It borders the regions of Boeny and Melaky.

The Kasijy Reserve is situated in this municipality.
