= Sarobaratra =

- Location in Madagascar
- Coordinates: 16°27′S 47°20′E
- Country: Madagascar
- Region: Betsiboka
- District: Tsaratanana
- Elevation: 83 m (272 ft)

Population (2001)
  - Total: 6,000
- Time zone: UTC3 (EAT)

Sarobaratra is a town and commune (Malagasy: kaominina) in Madagascar. It belongs to the district of Tsaratanana, which is a part of Betsiboka Region. The population of the commune was estimated to be approximately 6,000 in 2001 commune census.

Only primary schooling is available. The majority 65% of the population of the commune are farmers, while an additional 34% receives their livelihood from raising livestock. The most important crop is rice, while other important products are peanuts and maize. Services provide employment for 0.5% of the population. Additionally fishing employs 0.5% of the population.
