= Talata-Angavo =

- Location in Madagascar
- Coordinates: 18°12′S 47°06′E
- Country: Madagascar
- Region: Analamanga
- District: Ankazobe
- Elevation: 1,124 m (3,688 ft)

Population (2019)Census
  - Total: 9,240
- Time zone: UTC3 (EAT)
- Postal code: 108

Talata-Angavo is a village in Analamanga Region, in the Central Highlands of Madagascar, located north-west from the capital of Antananarivo. The population was 9,240 in 2019.

The village can be reached by the unpaved Route d'Interet Provinciale 40T (RIP 40T) from Ankazobe and the RN 4.
