= Tsararova =

- Location in Madagascar
- Coordinates: 16°42′S 47°40′E
- Country: Madagascar
- Region: Betsiboka
- District: Tsaratanana
- Elevation: 431 m (1,414 ft)

Population (2001)
  - Total: 7,000
- Time zone: UTC3 (EAT)

Tsararova or Tsaravova is a town and commune (Malagasy: kaominina) in Madagascar. It belongs to the district of Tsaratanana, which is a part of Betsiboka Region. The population of the commune was estimated to be approximately 7,000 in 2001 commune census.

Primary and junior level secondary education are available in town. The majority 60% of the population of the commune are farmers, while an additional 39% receives their livelihood from raising livestock. The most important crop is rice, while other important products are maize and cassava. Services provide employment for 1% of the population.
