= Barison Claude Andriambololona =

Malagasy politician

Barson Claude Andriambololona is a Malagasy politician. A member of the National Assembly of Madagascar, he was elected as a member of the Tiako I Madagasikara party in the 2007 Malagasy parliamentary elections; he represents the constituency of Kandreho.

He was named director of the cabinet of the ministry of finance in 2017.
