= Keliloha =

- Location in Madagascar
- Coordinates: 17°16′S 47°40′E
- Country: Madagascar
- Region: Betsiboka
- District: Tsaratanana
- Elevation: 666 m (2,185 ft)

Population (2001)
  - Total: 7,000
- Time zone: UTC3 (EAT)

Keliloha is a town and commune (Malagasy: kaominina) in Madagascar. It belongs to the district of Tsaratanana, which is a part of Betsiboka Region. The population of the commune was estimated to be approximately 7,000 in 2001 commune census.

Only primary schooling is available. The majority 59% of the population of the commune are farmers, while an additional 40% receives their livelihood from raising livestock. The most important crop is rice, while other important products are peanuts and cassava. Services provide employment for 1% of the population.
