= Ambohitromby, Ankazobe =

Ambohitromby
- Location in Madagascar
- Coordinates: 18°26′S 47°09′E
- Country: Madagascar
- Region: Analamanga
- District: Ankazobe

Area
  - Total: 277 km^{2} (107 sq mi)

Population (2019)Census
  - Total: 10,560
- Time zone: UTC3 (EAT)
- postal code: 108

Ambohitromby is a municipality in Analamanga Region, in the Central Highlands of Madagascar, located north from the capital of Antananarivo. The municipality lies along the National road No.4.
