= Andriba =

- Location in Madagascar
- Coordinates: 17°35′S 46°56′E
- Country: Madagascar
- Region: Betsiboka
- District: Maevatanana
- Elevation: 633 m (2,077 ft)

Population (2001)
  - Total: 32,000
- Time zone: UTC3 (EAT)
- Postal code: 412

Andriba is a municipality in Madagascar. It belongs to the district of Maevatanana, which is a part of Betsiboka Region. The population of the commune was estimated to be approximately 32,000 in 2001 commune census.

Primary and junior level secondary education are available in town. The majority 70% of the population of the commune are farmers, while an additional 25% receives their livelihood from raising livestock. The most important crops are rice and raffia palm, while other important agricultural products are cassava and bambara groundnut. Services provide employment for 5% of the population.

== History ==
On 20 August 1895 French invasion forces approached the town of Andriba that was taken on the following day, after brief combats with the Hova defenders.
