= Bekapaika =

- Location in Madagascar
- Coordinates: 16°45′S 47°34′E
- Country: Madagascar
- Region: Betsiboka
- District: Tsaratanana
- Elevation: 336 m (1,102 ft)

Population (2001)
  - Total: 12,000
- Time zone: UTC3 (EAT)

Bekapaika is a town and commune (Malagasy: kaominina) in Madagascar. It belongs to the district of Tsaratanana, which is a part of Betsiboka Region. The population of the commune was estimated to be approximately 12,000 in 2001 commune census.

Only primary schooling is available. The majority 50% of the population of the commune are farmers, while an additional 35% receives their livelihood from raising livestock. The most important crop is rice, while other important products are bananas and cassava. Services provide employment for 15% of the population.
