= Maria, Madagascar =

Maria
- Location in Madagascar
- Coordinates: 17°17′S 46°26′E
- Country: Madagascar
- Region: Betsiboka
- District: Maevatanana
- Elevation: 106 m (348 ft)

Population (2001)
  - Total: 7,000
- Time zone: UTC3 (EAT)

Maria is a town and commune (Malagasy: kaominina) in Madagascar. It belongs to the district of Maevatanana, which is a part of Betsiboka Region. The population of the commune was estimated to be approximately 7,000 in 2001 commune census.

Only primary schooling is available. The town provides access to hospital services to its citizens. The majority 90% of the population of the commune are farmers, while an additional 7% receives their livelihood from raising livestock. The most important crop is rice, while other important products are bananas, sugarcane, cassava and sweet potatoes. Services provide employment for 1% of the population. Additionally fishing employs 2% of the population.
