= Beratsimanana =

- Location in Madagascar
- Coordinates: 16°53′S 46°53′E
- Country: Madagascar
- Region: Betsiboka
- District: Maevatanana
- Elevation: 54 m (177 ft)

Population (2001)
  - Total: 8,000
- Time zone: UTC3 (EAT)

Beratsimanana is a town and commune (Malagasy: kaominina) in Madagascar. It belongs to the district of Maevatanana, which is a part of Betsiboka Region. The population of the commune was estimated to be approximately 8,000 in 2001 commune census.

Only primary schooling is available. The majority 80% of the population of the commune are farmers, while an additional 20% receives their livelihood from raising livestock. The most important crops are rice and peanuts, while other important agricultural products are sweet potatoes and tobacco.
