= Mahazoma =

- Location in Madagascar
- Coordinates: 17°10′S 46°34′E
- Country: Madagascar
- Region: Betsiboka
- District: Maevatanana
- Elevation: 81 m (266 ft)

Population (2001)
  - Total: 18,000
- Time zone: UTC3 (EAT)

Mahazoma is a town and commune (Malagasy: kaominina) in Madagascar. It belongs to the district of Maevatanana, which is a part of Betsiboka Region. The population of the commune was estimated to be approximately 18,000 in 2001 commune census.

Primary and junior level secondary education are available in town. The town provides access to hospital services to its citizens. It is also a site of industrial-scale mining.

The majority 80% of the population of the commune are farmers, while an additional 10% receives their livelihood from raising livestock. The most important crop is rice, while other important products are maize, cassava and sweet potatoes. Services provide employment for 5% of the population. Additionally fishing employs 5% of the population.
