= Antanimbary =

- Location in Madagascar
- Coordinates: 17°11′S 46°51′E
- Country: Madagascar
- Region: Betsiboka
- District: Maevatanana
- Elevation: 268 m (879 ft)

Population (2001)
  - Total: 3,000
- Time zone: UTC3 (EAT)

Antanimbary is a town and commune (Malagasy: kaominina) in Madagascar. It belongs to the district of Maevatanana, which is a part of Betsiboka Region. The population of the commune was estimated to be approximately 3,000 in 2001 commune census.

Antanimbary has a riverine harbour. Only primary schooling is available. The majority 60% of the population of the commune are farmers, while an additional 25% receives their livelihood from raising livestock. The most important crops are rice and raffia palm, while other important agricultural products are cassava and sweet potatoes. Services provide employment for 5% of the population. Additionally fishing employs 10% of the population.

== Infrastructure ==
- Route Nationale 4 from Antananarivo to Mahajanga.
