= Fihaonana =

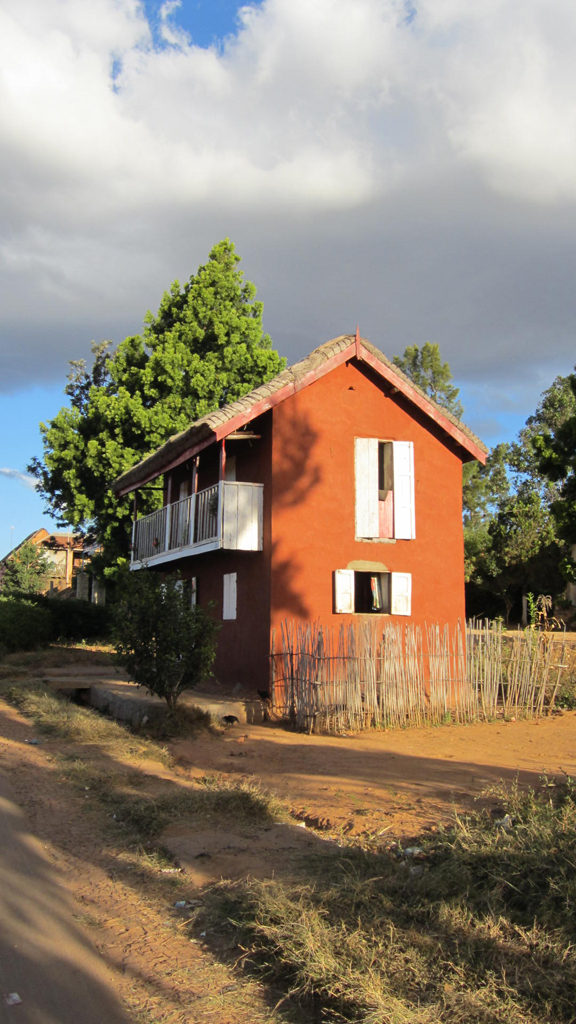
- Fiahonana

- Location in Madagascar
- Coordinates: 18°36′S 47°12′E
- Country: Madagascar
- Region: Analamanga
- District: Ankazobe
- Elevation: 1,345 m (4,413 ft)

Population (2012)
  - Total: 18,846
- Time zone: UTC3 (EAT)

Fihaonana is a town in Analamanga Region, in the Central Highlands of Madagascar, located north at 60 km from the capital of Antananarivo, 5 km off from the highway RN 4 to Mahajunga.

The commune is composed of 16 villages (fokontany):

Andriatsibibiarivony, Tsitakondaza, Manankasina, Lovasoa, Manantenasoa, Tsaramivondrona, Tsimialona, Tsimiamboholahy, Fihaonana, Masindray-Est, Fokotsambo, Sambatra, Madiokororoka, Antsapanimahazo, Ambohimpiainana, Andranovelona, Andranofotsifandrosoana, Ambohitraina.

== Buddhist Temple ==
Along the RN4 is situated the largest Buddhist temple in Madagascar (in Andranovelona).
