= Antakavana =

- Location in Madagascar
- Coordinates: 18°02′S 47°23′E
- Country: Madagascar
- Region: Analamanga
- District: Ankazobe
- Elevation: 958 m (3,143 ft)
- Time zone: UTC3 (EAT)

Ambohidratrimo or Antakavana-Andranomiady is a town in Analamanga Region, in the Central Highlands of Madagascar, located north at 140 km from the capital of Antananarivo.

The only reserve in Analamanga, Ambohitantely Reserve is located in this town.
