= Manakana, Tsaratanana =

Manakana
- Location in Madagascar
- Coordinates: 17°45′S 47°31′E
- Country: Madagascar
- Region: Betsiboka
- District: Tsaratanana
- Elevation: 806 m (2,644 ft)

Population (2001)
  - Total: 8,000
- Time zone: UTC3 (EAT)

Manakana is a town and commune (Malagasy: kaominina) in Madagascar. It belongs to the district of Tsaratanana, which is a part of Betsiboka Region. The population of the commune was estimated to be approximately 8,000 in 2001 commune census.

Primary and junior level secondary education are available in town. It is also a site of industrial-scale mining. The majority 68% of the population of the commune are farmers, while an additional 30% receives their livelihood from raising livestock. The most important crop is rice, while other important products are peanuts and onions. Industry and services provide employment for 0.5% and 1.5% of the population, respectively.
