= Mahavavy-Kinkony =

Protected area in Madagascar

Mahavavy-Kinkony Reserve
- IUCN category V (protected landscape/seascape)
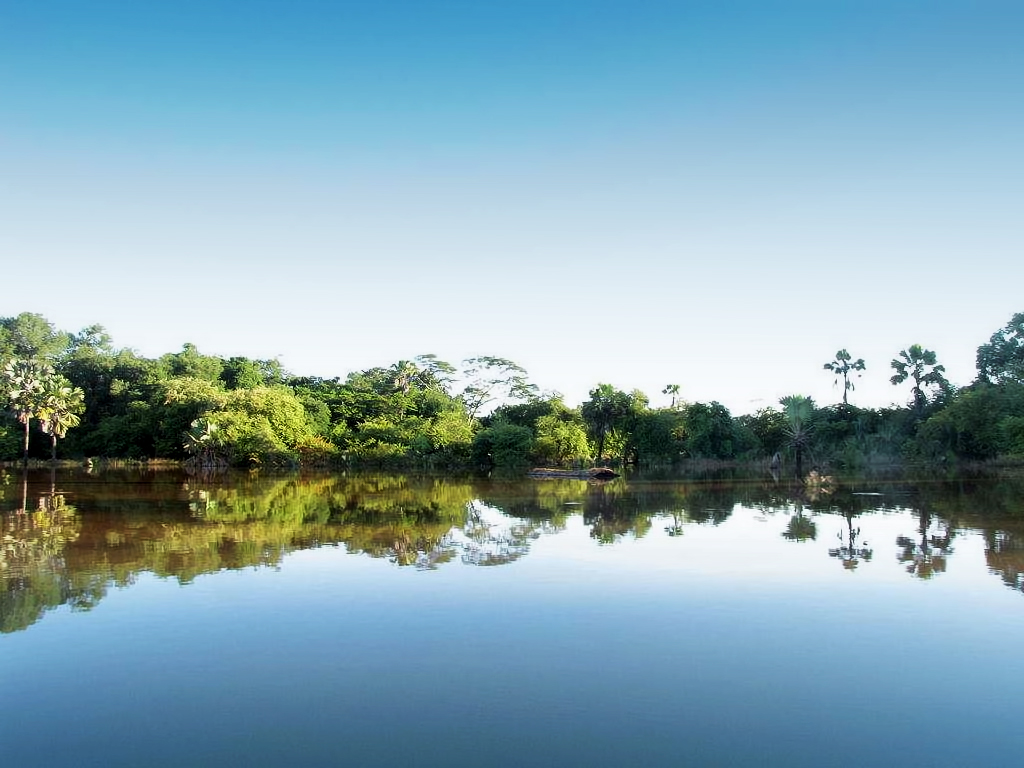

- Location within Madagascar
- Location: Boeny, Madagascar
- Nearest city: Mahajanga, Mitsinjo
- Coordinates: 16°08′19″S 45°50′50″E
- Area: 3,020 km^{2} (1,170 sq mi)
- Established: 21 April 2015
- Governing body: Asity Madagascar

The Mahavavy-Kinkony Reserve is a protected area consisting principally of dry deciduous forest and wetlands in the western part of Madagascar.

It owes its name to the Mahavavy Sud River and Lake Kinkony. Nine primate species, 30 fish species, 37 reptile and amphibian species, 133 bird species have been recorded on the wildlife diversity. The Mahavavy-Kinkony Complex IBA, a 300,000-ha landscape including coastal and freshwater wetlands and forests (mangrove and dryland) in Madagascar, including Lake Kinkony Ramsar site and the Mahavavy River Delta, is important to local people for fishing, hunting and agriculture and is home to a large number of threatened wildlife species.

== Conservation ==
Tsiombikibo Classified Forest (Forêt Classée de Tsiombikibo) was established on 19 October 1957 under Order No. 299-AE/PL, covering 21,600 ha. Lake Kinkony was declared a hunting reserve (réserve de chasse) on 13 January 1972 by Order No. 0126-SEHAEF/DIR/FOR, with an area of 15,000 ha covering the eastern and southeastern portions of the lake. These sites were incorporated into the Mahavavy-Kinkony harmonious protected landscape (paysage harmonieux protégé) on 21 April 2015 by Decree No. 2015-718.

== See also ==
- National parks of Madagascar
