= Bemokotra =

- Location in Madagascar
- Coordinates: 17°3′S 46°42′E
- Country: Madagascar
- Region: Betsiboka
- District: Maevatanana
- Elevation: 69 m (226 ft)

Population (2001)
  - Total: 5,000
- Time zone: UTC3 (EAT)

Bemokotra is a town and commune (Malagasy: kaominina) in Madagascar. It belongs to the district of Maevatanana, which is a part of Betsiboka Region. The population of the commune was estimated to be approximately 5,000 in 2001 commune census.

Only primary schooling is available. The majority 70% of the population of the commune are farmers, while an additional 22% receives their livelihood from raising livestock. The most important crop is rice, while other important products are peanuts and sweet potatoes. Services provide employment for 1% of the population. Additionally fishing employs 7% of the population.
