= Tsaratanana =

- Location in Madagascar
- Coordinates: 16°47′50″S 47°39′10″E
- Country: Madagascar
- Region: Betsiboka
- District: Tsaratanana
- Elevation: 350 m (1,150 ft)

Population (2018)
  - Total: 24,971
- Time zone: UTC3 (EAT)
- Postal code: 421

Tsaratanana is a rural municipality in Madagascar. It belongs to the district of Tsaratanana, which is a part of Betsiboka Region. The population of the commune was 24,971 in 2018.

Tsaratanana is served by a local airport. In addition to primary schooling, the town offers secondary education at both junior and senior levels. The town provides access to hospital services to its citizens.

The majority 65% of the population of the commune are farmers, while an additional 33% receive their livelihood from raising livestock. The most important crop is rice, while other important products are bananas and cassava. Services provide employment for 2% of the population.

== Roads ==
It is situated on the Route Nationale 33a and the Kamoro River.
