= Andriamena =

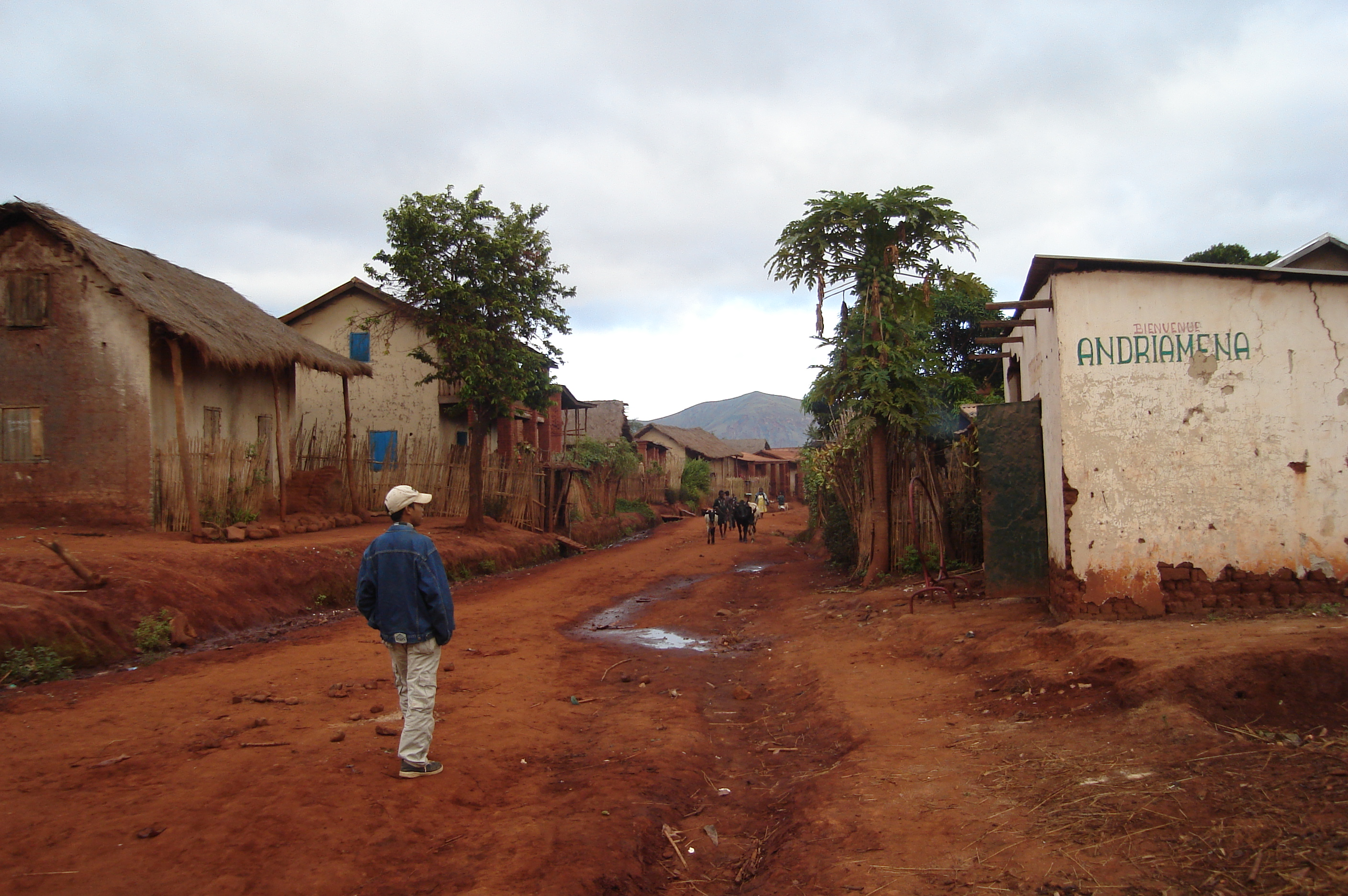

- Location in Madagascar
- Coordinates: 17°26′S 47°30′E
- Country: Madagascar
- Region: Betsiboka
- District: Tsaratanana
- Elevation: 771 m (2,530 ft)

Population (2018)census
  - Total: 2,698
- Time zone: UTC3 (EAT)
- Postal code: 421

Andriamena is a rural municipality in Madagascar. It belongs to the district of Tsaratanana, which is a part of Betsiboka Region. The population of the municipality was 2,698 inhabitants in 2018.

Primary and junior level secondary education are available in town. The majority 54% of the population of the commune are farmers, while an additional 44% receives their livelihood from raising livestock. The most important crop is rice, while other important products are peanuts and cassava. Services provide employment for 2% of the population.
