= Mahatsinjo, Maevatanana =

Mahatsinjo
- Location in Madagascar
- Coordinates: 17°44′S 47°2′E
- Country: Madagascar
- Region: Betsiboka
- District: Maevatanana
- Elevation: 816 m (2,677 ft)

Population (2018)Census
  - Total: 14,675
- Time zone: UTC3 (EAT)
- Postal code: 412

Mahatsinjo is a rural municipality in Madagascar. It belongs to the district of Maevatanana, which is a part of Betsiboka Region. The population of the municipality was 14675 in 2018.

Only primary schooling is available. The majority 85% of the population of the commune are farmers, while an additional 12% receives their livelihood from raising livestock. The most important crop is rice, while other important products are maize, cassava, barley and sweet potatoes. Services provide employment for 3% of the population.

== Infrastructure ==
- Route Nationale 4 from Antananarivo to Mahajanga.
