= Morafeno, Maevatanana =

Morafeno
- Location in Madagascar
- Coordinates: 17°36′S 47°15′E
- Country: Madagascar
- Region: Betsiboka
- District: Maevatanana
- Elevation: 652 m (2,139 ft)

Population (2001)
  - Total: 3,000
- Time zone: UTC3 (EAT)
- Postal code: 412

Morafeno is a rural municipality in Madagascar. It belongs to the district of Maevatanana, which is a part of Betsiboka Region. The population of the commune was estimated to be approximately 3,000 in 2001.

Only primary schooling is available. The majority 75% of the population of the commune are farmers, while an additional 20% receives their livelihood from raising livestock. The most important crop is rice, while other important products are peanuts and cassava. Services provide employment for 5% of the population.

== Rivers ==
Morafeno is situated at the Betsiboka River.
