= Ambalanjanakomby =

- Location in Madagascar
- Coordinates: 16°42′S 47°5′E
- Country: Madagascar
- Region: Betsiboka
- District: Maevatanana
- Elevation: 78 m (256 ft)

Population (2001)
  - Total: 10,000
- Time zone: UTC3 (EAT)

Ambalanjanakomby is a town and commune (Malagasy: kaominina) in Madagascar. It belongs to the district of Maevatanana, which is a part of Betsiboka Region. The population of the commune was estimated to be approximately 10,000 in 2001 commune census.

Only primary schooling is available. The majority 85% of the population of the commune are farmers. The most important crops are rice and peas, while other important agricultural products are beans and maize. Industry provides employment for 10% of the population. Additionally fishing employs 5% of the population.
