= Morarano Chrome =

- Location in Madagascar
- Coordinates: 17°45′S 48°10′E
- Country: Madagascar
- Region: Alaotra-Mangoro
- District: Amparafaravola
- Elevation: 787 m (2,582 ft)

Population
  - Total: 42,147
- Time zone: UTC3 (EAT)

Morarano Chrome is a town and commune (Malagasy: kaominina) in Madagascar. It belongs to the district of Amparafaravola, which is a part of the Alaotra-Mangoro Region. The population of the commune was estimated to be approximately 42,127.

This town lies on the junction of National road 3a and National road 33 and also the MLA (Moramanga-Lac Alaotra) railways.

Primary and junior-level secondary education are available in town. The majority (92%) of the population of the commune are farmers. The most important crop is rice; other important products are maize and cassava. Services provide employment for 7% of the population, and fishing employs 1%.
