= Kiangara =

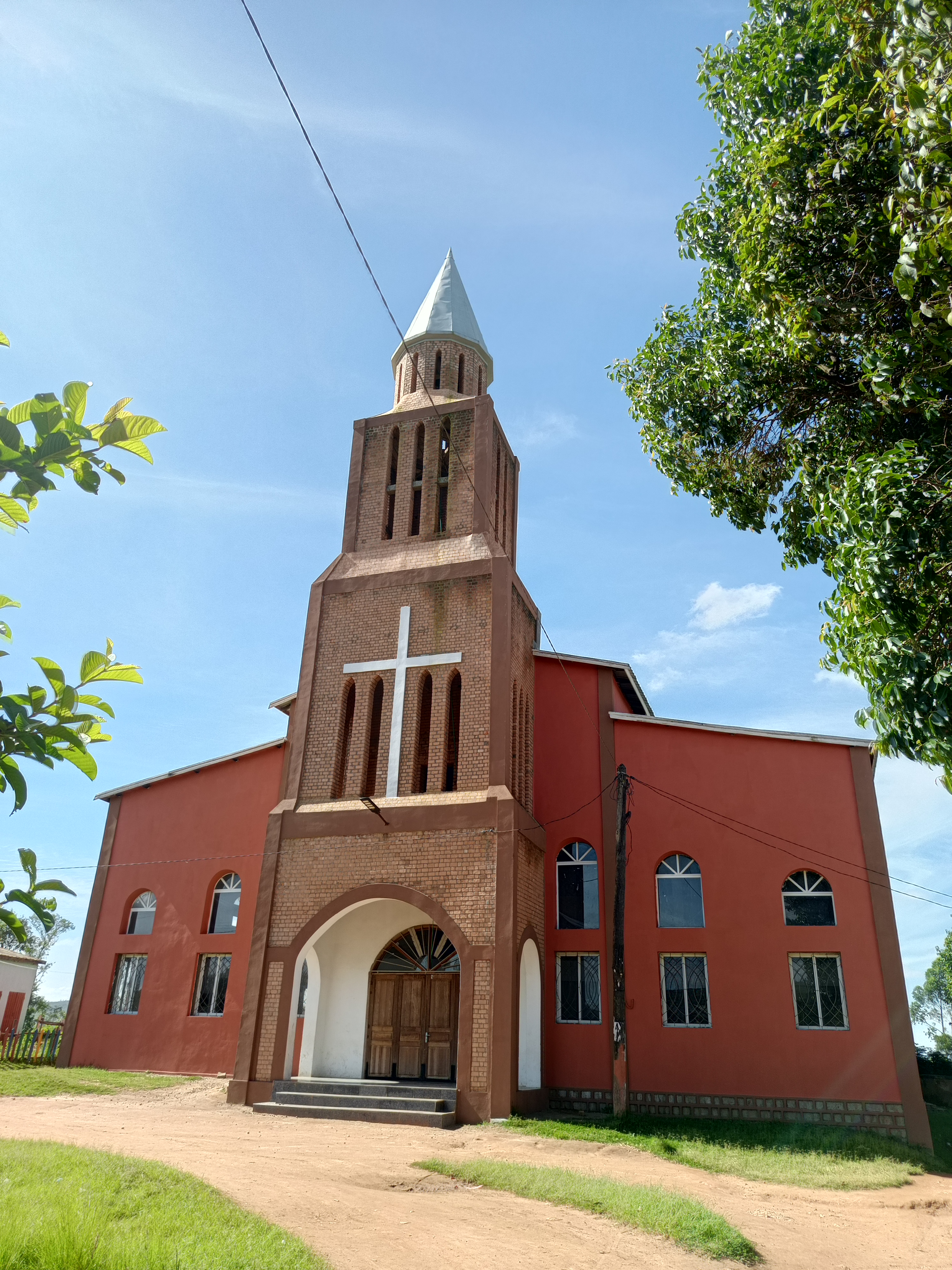
- FJKM church in Mandrarahody (fokontany)

- Location in Madagascar
- Coordinates: 17°58′S 47°02′E
- Country: Madagascar
- Region: Analamanga
- District: Ankazobe
- Elevation: 895 m (2,936 ft)

Population (2018)
  - Total: 18,197
- Time zone: UTC3 (EAT)
- postal code: 108

Kiangara is a town in Analamanga Region, in the Central Highlands of Madagascar, in the district of Ankazobe. It is located north-west from the capital of Antananarivo. It has a population of 18,197 inhabitants in 2018.
