= Tsaratanana Airport =

Airport in Madagascar

- IATA: TTS; ICAO: FMNT

Summary
- Airport type: Public/Military
- Operator: ADEMA (Aéroports de Madagascar)
- Serves: Tsaratanana
- Location: Betsiboka, Madagascar
- Elevation AMSL: 1,073 ft / 372 m
- Coordinates: 16°45′03″S 47°37′08″E

Map
- Location within Madagascar

Runways
Direction	Length		Surface
Direction	ft	m	Surface
(16/34)	(3,100)	(950)	grass

Tsaratanana Airport is an airport in Tsaratanana, Betsiboka Region, Madagascar (IATA: TTS, ICAO: FMNT).
