= Ambakireny =

- Location in Madagascar
- Coordinates: 17°40′S 47°51′E
- Country: Madagascar
- Region: Betsiboka
- District: Tsaratanana
- Elevation: 882 m (2,894 ft)

Population (2001)
  - Total: 13,000
- Time zone: UTC3 (EAT)

Ambakireny is a town and commune (Malagasy: kaominina) in Madagascar. It belongs to the district of Tsaratanana, which is a part of Betsiboka Region. The population of the commune was estimated to be approximately 13,000 in 2001 commune census.

Primary and junior level secondary education are available in town. The majority 54% of the population of the commune are farmers, while an additional 44% receives their livelihood from raising livestock. The most important crop is rice, while other important products are peanuts and sugarcane. Industry and services provide both employment for 1% of the population.
