= Andranomiely Sud =

Andranomiely Sud Andranomiely Atsimo
- Location in Madagascar
- Coordinates: 17°14′S 47°50′E
- Country: Madagascar
- Region: Analamanga
- District: Ankazobe
- Elevation: 814 m (2,671 ft)

Population (2019)Census
  - Total: 6,556
- Time zone: UTC3 (EAT)
- postal code: 108

Andranomiely Sud (also called: Andranomiely Atsimo) is a village in Analamanga Region, in the Central Highlands of Madagascar, located north-west from the capital of Antananarivo.
