= Tsararano, Maevatanana =

Tsararano
- Location in Madagascar
- Coordinates: 17°20′S 46°21′E
- Country: Madagascar
- Region: Betsiboka
- District: Maevatanana
- Elevation: 133 m (436 ft)

Population (2001)
  - Total: 10,000
- Time zone: UTC3 (EAT)

Tsararano is a town and commune (Malagasy: kaominina) in Madagascar. It belongs to the district of Maevatanana, which is a part of Betsiboka Region. The population of the commune was estimated to be approximately 10,000 in the 2001 commune census.

Primary and junior level secondary education are available in town. 98% of the population of the commune are farmers. The most important crops are rice and tobacco, while other important agricultural products are peas and cotton. Additionally, fishing employs 2% of the population.
