= Mahavavy Sud River =

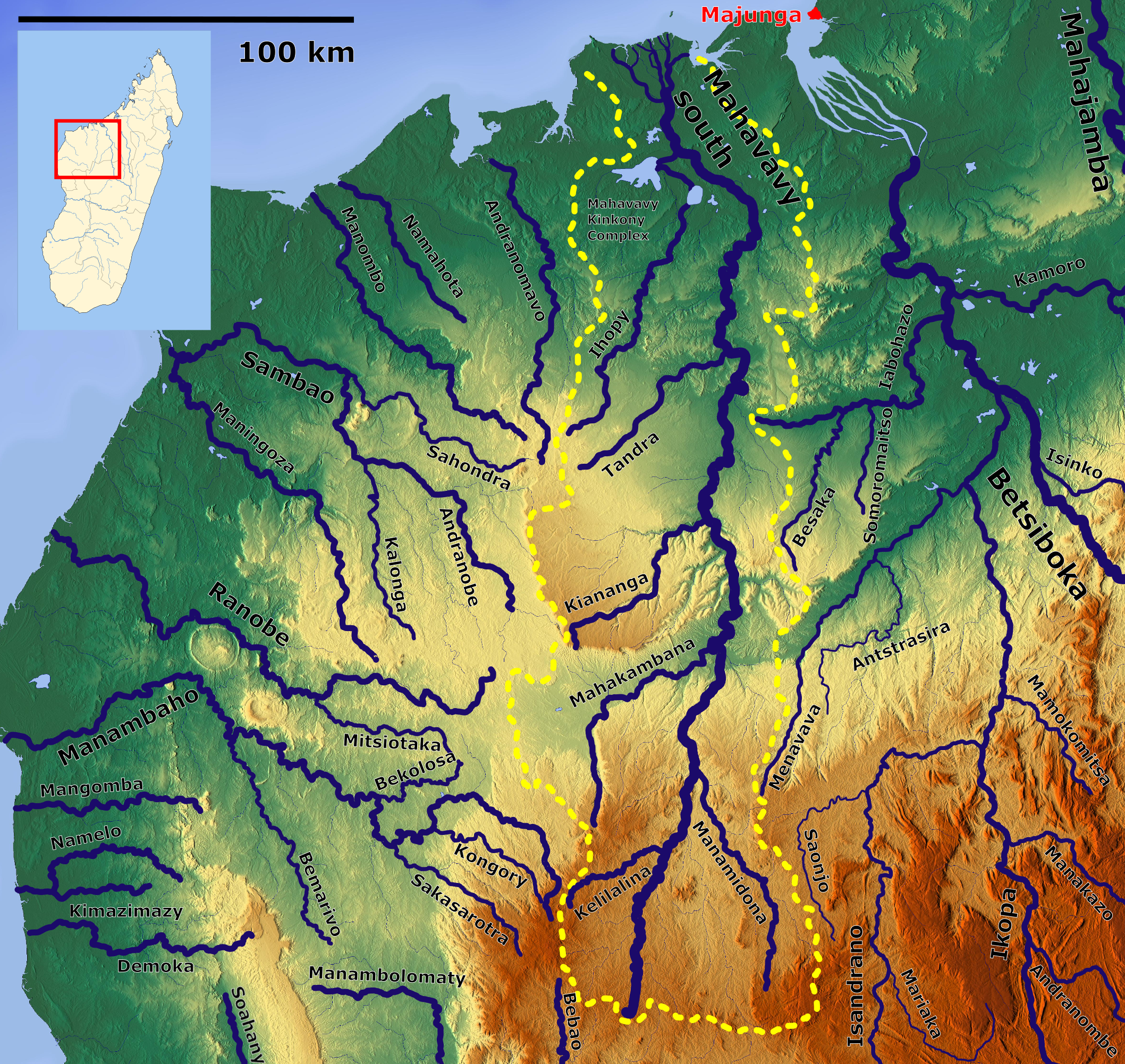

Location
- Country: Madagascar
- Region: Betsiboka, Boeny, Bongolava, Melaky

Physical characteristics
- Source
  - location: Andranofotsibe Massif
  - elevation: 1,000 m (3,300 ft)
- Mouth: Mozambique Channel, Indian Ocean
  - coordinates: 15°47′47″S 45°46′54″E
  - elevation: 0 m (0 ft)
- Length: 410 km (250 mi)
- Basin size: 16,475 km^{2} (6,361 sq mi)
- Discharge
  - location: Mahavavy Delta
  - average: (Period: 1971–2000)578.4 m^{3}/s (20,430 cu ft/s)

Basin features
- River system: Mahavavy Sud River
- Tributaries
  - left: Mahakambana
  - right: Kiranomena, Manamidona

The Mahavavy Sud, also known as the Mahavavy South, is a river in western Madagascar. It flows from south to north through the regions of Melaky, Betsiboka, Bongolava and Boeny. It has a length of approximately 410 km (250 mi), and drains a basin of 16,475 km^{2} (6,361 mi^{2}). It is distinct from the Mahavavy Nord several hundred km to the north.

The Mahavavy Sud rises on the Andranofotsibe Massif at about 1000 meters elevation. It flows southwards, joined by the Kiranomena and Manamidona rivers which originate on the Famoizankova massif. The first 125 km of the river's course has a steep gradient, about 7 meters per kilometer. At Kandreho the river enters an east–west depression and is joined by the Mahakambana, which drains the western portion of the depression.

Leaving the depression the river flows southwards through the Ankara and Kelifely limestone plateaus in deep gorges, and Kasijy Special Reserve is on the west bank of the river.

The lower course of the river, below Sitampiky at 280 km from its source, runs through level country. The river's gradient is low, with a slope of 40 cm per km. The river is edged with marshes and shallow lakes, including lakes Kinkony and Katondro, which are replenished by the river during high water periods. The river forms a large delta as it empties into the Mozambique Channel.

The Mahavavy-Kinkony protected area covers much of the lower watershed, including Lake Kinkony and the river delta. It was designated Mahavavy-Kinkony harmonious protected landscape (paysage harmonieux protégé) on 21 April 2015 by Decree No. 2015-718, combining the 15,000-ha Lake Kinkony hunting reserve, created in 1972, and the Tsiombikibo Classified Forest (Forêt Classée de Tsiombikibo), established in 1957. Mahavavy-Kinkony is designated an Important Bird Area.
