= Mangasoavina =

- Location in Madagascar
- Coordinates: 18°10′S 47°02′E
- Country: Madagascar
- Region: Analamanga
- District: Ankazobe

Population (2019)
  - Total: 5,384
- Time zone: UTC3 (EAT)
- Postal code: 108

Mangasoavina is a town in Analamanga Region, in the Central Highlands of Madagascar, located north from the capital of Antananarivo. The population is 5,384 by 2019.
