= Tsaramasoandro =

- Location in Madagascar
- Coordinates: 17°59′S 47°12′E
- Country: Madagascar
- Region: Analamanga
- District: Ankazobe
- Elevation: 1,100 m (3,600 ft)

Population (2018)
  - Total: 9,747
- Time zone: UTC3 (EAT)
- postal code: 108

Tsaramasoandro is a town in Analamanga Region, in the Central Highlands of Madagascar, in the district of Ankazobe. It is located north-west of the capital of Antananarivo. It has a population of 9,747 inhabitants in 2018.
