= Brieville =

- Location in Madagascar
- Coordinates: 17°34′S 47°40′E
- Country: Madagascar
- Region: Betsiboka
- District: Tsaratanana
- Elevation: 881 m (2,890 ft)

Population (2001)
  - Total: 14,000
- Time zone: UTC3 (EAT)

Brieville is a town and commune (Malagasy: kaominina) in Madagascar. It belongs to the district of Tsaratanana, which is a part of Betsiboka Region. The population of the commune was estimated to be approximately 14,000 in a 2001 commune census.

== Extraction of Chrome ==
The only mine of extraction of chromite is located in Brieville. They are presently exploited by KRAOMA.

Primary and junior level secondary education are available in town. It is also a site of industrial-scale mining. The majority 53.2% of the population of the commune are farmers, while an additional 43% receives their livelihood from raising livestock. The most important crop is rice, while other important products are maize and cassava. Industry and services provide employment for 2.8% and 1% of the population, respectively.
