= Lake Kinkony =

Lake in Madagascar

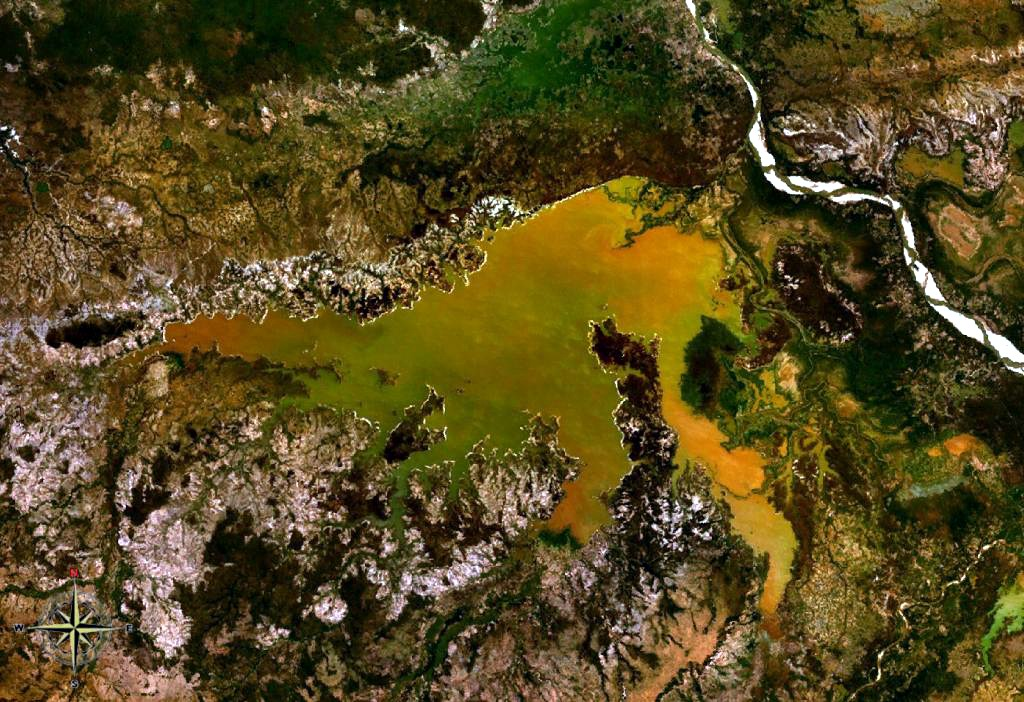
- from space

- Location within Madagascar
- Location: Mahajanga Province
- Coordinates: 16°9′0″S 45°50′0″E
- Basin countries: Madagascar
- Surface area: ca. 100 km^{2} (39 sq mi)

Ramsar Wetland
- Official name: Lac Kinkony
- Designated: 5 June 2012
- Reference no.: 2048

Lake Kinkony is a large lake in the northwestern part of Madagascar, in the lower Mahavavy Sud River watershed in Boeny region (former Mahajanga Province). It is located at around 16°9′0″S 45°50′0″E and has an area of about 100 km^{2}. The lake is an important wetland site for birds.
