= Miantso =

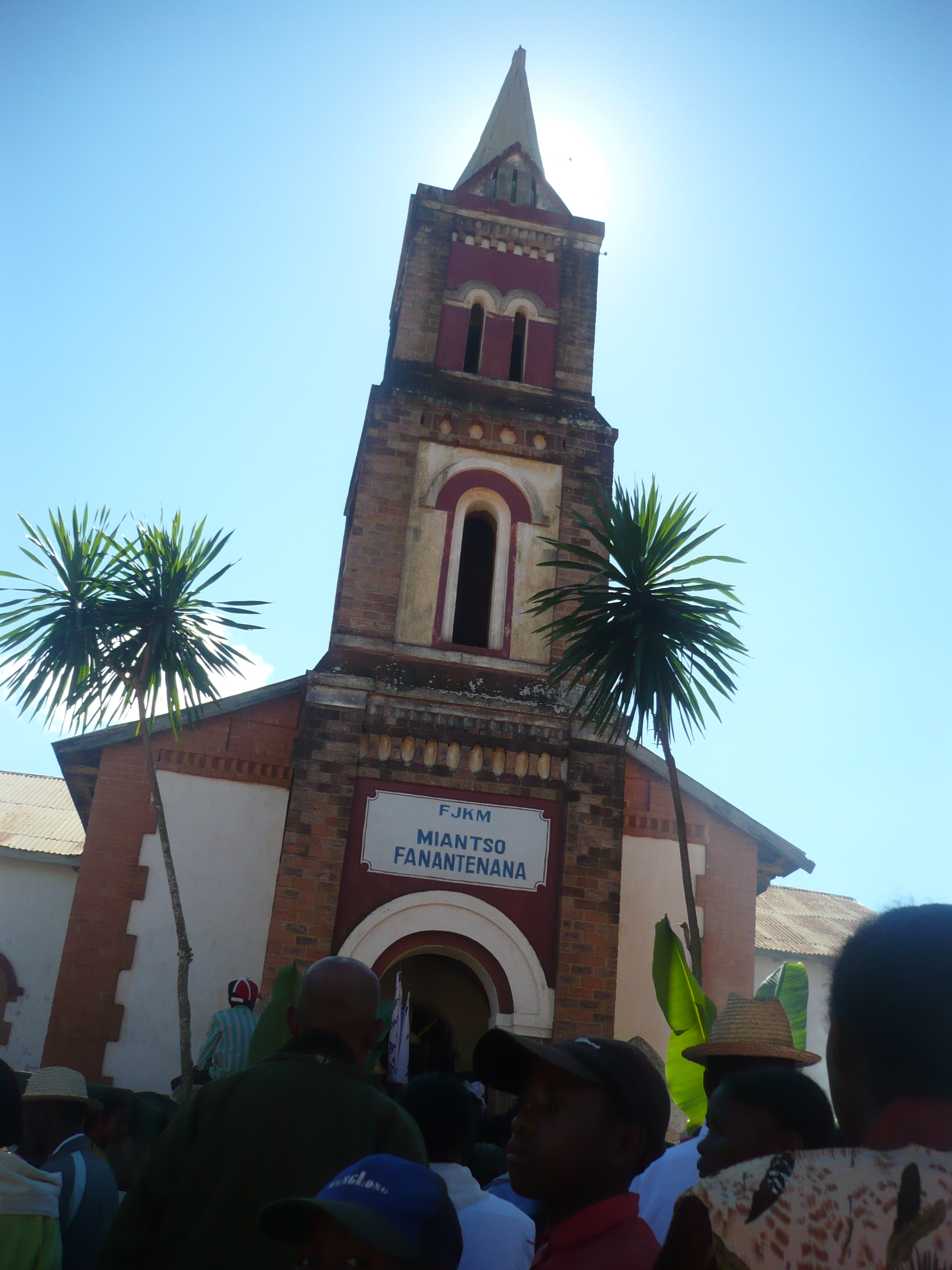
- church of Miantso

- Location in Madagascar
- Coordinates: 18°43′S 47°09′E
- Country: Madagascar
- Region: Analamanga
- District: Ankazobe

Area
  - Total: 19,537 km^{2} (7,543 sq mi)

Population (2019)
  - Total: 23,691
- Time zone: UTC3 (EAT)
- Postal code: 108

Miantso is a town in Analamanga Region, in the Central Highlands of Madagascar, located north-west from the capital of Antananarivo.

The town is linked by the RNT 36 in bad state of conservation to Antananarivo, via Ampanotokana and Mahitsy.

== Commune ==
12 villages belong to the Fokontany (village) of Miantso:

Fokontany (village) Surface (km2)

- ANTSAMPANIMAHAZO - 9,61 km2
- TAFAINA - 23,78
- FKT FENOSOA - 23,00
- MANDROSORASAHA - 14,87
- TALATA AVARADRANO - 35,86
- ANDRIATEIARA - 8,17
- ANDRAISO - 5,33
- MIANTSO - 10,56
- MANDRIANKENIHENY - 20,91
- SOAVINA - 22,53
- AVARATRAMBATO - 10,69
- ANDREFAMBATO - 10,06

TOTAL 195,37 km2
