= Mahavelona, Ankazobe =

Mahavelona
- Location in Madagascar
- Coordinates: 18°31′S 47°15′E
- Country: Madagascar
- Region: Analamanga
- District: Ankazobe

Population (2018)
  - Total: 16,028
- Time zone: UTC3 (EAT)
- Postal code: 108

Mahavelona (Ankozobe) is a town in Analamanga Region, in the Central Highlands of Madagascar, located north-west from the capital of Antananarivo. The population is 16,028 by 2018.
