= Kandreho =

- Location in Madagascar
- Coordinates: 17°29′S 46°06′E
- Country: Madagascar
- Region: Betsiboka
- District: Kandreho

Area
  - Total: 1,275 km^{2} (492 sq mi)

Population (2018)Census
  - Total: 7,400
- Time zone: UTC3 (EAT)
- Postal code: 411

Kandreho is a municipality in western Madagascar in Betsiboka Region approximately 200 kilometres (120 mi) north-west of the capital Antananarivo. It is situated at 144 km from Maevatanana.

== See also ==
- Mahavavy Sud River
- Kandreho Formation
- Kasijy Reserve
