= Antotohazo =

- Location in Madagascar
- Coordinates: 18°28′S 47°05′E
- Country: Madagascar
- Region: Analamanga
- District: Ankazobe

Area
  - Total: 277 km^{2} (107 sq mi)
- Elevation: 1,305 m (4,281 ft)

Population
  - Total: 18,774
- Time zone: UTC3 (EAT)
- postal code: 108

Antotohazo is a town in Analamanga Region, in the Central Highlands of Madagascar, located north-west from the capital of Antananarivo.
