= Kasijy Special Reserve =

- IUCN category IV (habitat/species management area)
- Location within Madagascar
- Location: Betsiboka Region, Madagascar
- Nearest city: Antanimbaribe, Kandreho
- Coordinates: 17°04′S 45°55′E
- Area: 229.56 km^{2} (88.63 sq mi)
- Established: 10 September 1956; 69 years ago
- Governing body: Madagascar National Parks

Kasijy Special Reserve is a 19,800 hectares (49,000 acres) wildlife reserve in the Betsiboka region of Madagascar. Nearly half of the species of plants and animals recorded within the reserve are endemic to Madagascar and BirdLife International have listed the reserve as an Important Bird Area.)

== Geography ==
Kasijy Special Reserve is 20 kilometres (12 mi) north-west of Bemonto (municipality of Antanimbaribe) in the Betsiboka region of Madagascar. Access is difficult because of the poor roads and there is no accommodation or Park Office in the reserve. The nearest accommodation is in the port of Mahajanga, to the north. There are two outcrops of karst, the Kasijy massif and the smaller Analamajera massif; both are covered in forest. Kasijy Special Reserve covers 19,800 hectares (49,000 acres), of which 14,931 hectares (36,900 acres) are savanna and 4,394 hectares (10,860 acres) tropical rainforest. There is also swamp and open water on the reserve. The site is bordered by three rivers; in the north is the Andranomaitso River, the Mahavavy Sud River in the east and the Mahiarere River to the south. The climate is harsh with a dry season from April to November when the rivers run dry, and the reserve is closed to visitors in the wet season which runs from December to April. Annual rainfall is 1,679 millimetres (66.1 in) and temperatures can reach 38 °C (100 °F).

The dominant ethnic groups are the Sakalava people and Tsimihety people.

== Wildlife ==
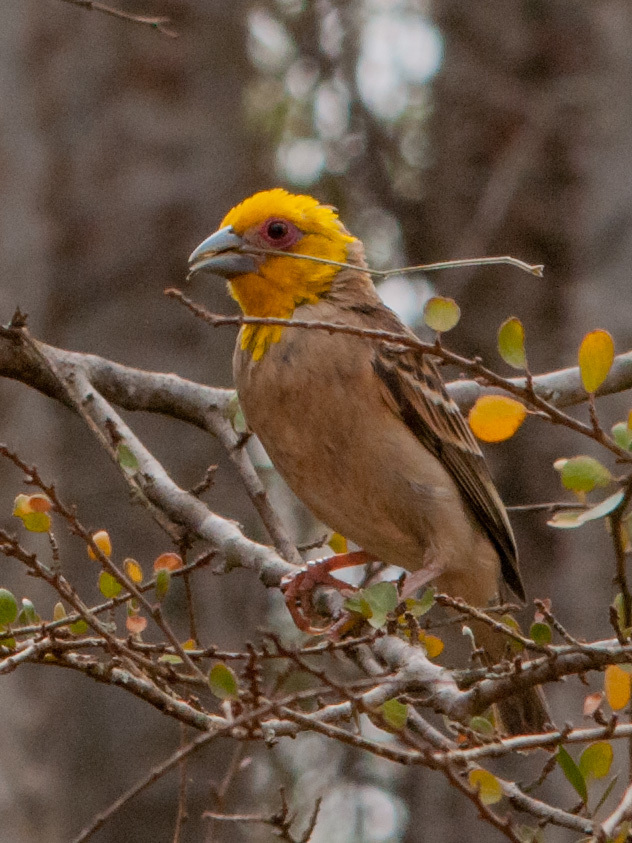
Ploceus sakalava

The karst outcrops are covered in dense, semi-deciduous, and dry forest and the typical trees are species of Adansonia, Cedrelopsis and Hildegardia. In the southern part of the reserve is savannah with woody shrubs.

Fifteen species of mammals, six species of amphibian, 22 species of reptiles and 67 species of birds have, so far, been recorded on the reserve. Some of the species found:

- Accipiter henstii (Henst's goshawk)
- Coua coquereli (Coquerel's coua)
- Coua gigas (giant coua)
- Falculea palliata (sickle-billed vanga)
- Philepitta schlegeli (Schlegel's asity)
- Ploceus sakalava (Sakalava weaver)

== Threats ==
The savanna is graze by herds of introduced zebu.
