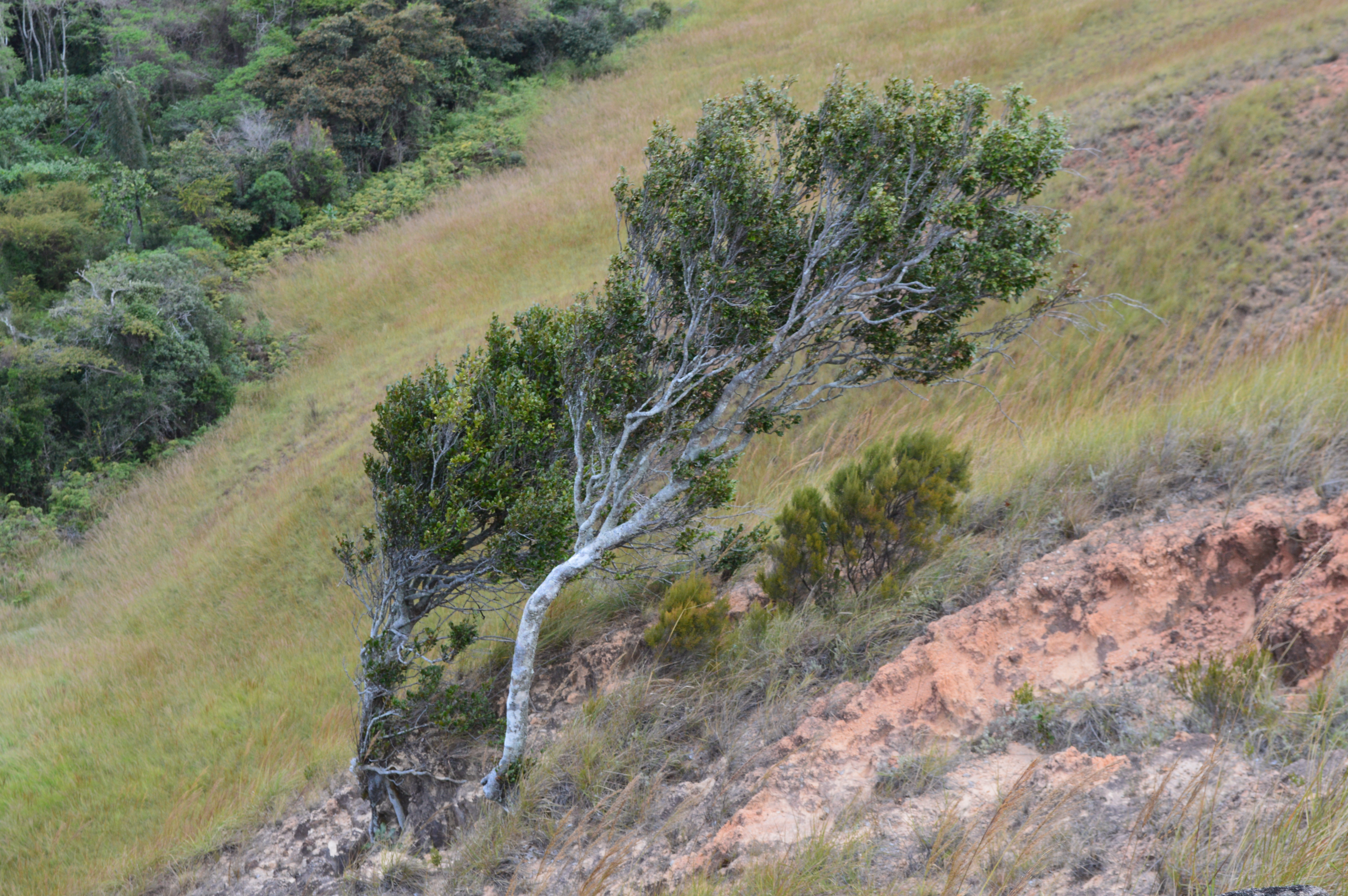
- Mature tree, Ankazobe, Madagascar

Conservation status
- Critically Endangered (IUCN 3.1)

Scientific classification
- Kingdom: Plantae
- Clade: Tracheophytes
- Clade: Angiosperms
- Clade: Eudicots
- Clade: Rosids
- Order: Malvales
- Family: Sarcolaenaceae
- Genus: Schizolaena
- Species: S. tampoketsana

Binomial name
- Schizolaena tampoketsana Lowry, G.E. Schatz, J.-F. Leroy & A.-E. Wolf

= Schizolaena tampoketsana =

Species of tree

Schizolaena tampoketsana (Malagasy: sohisika) is a species of tree in the family Sarcolaenaceae endemic to the mid-altitude savanna of Ankazobe, Madagascar. It is threatened by wildfires and habitat loss due to rice farming. The International Union for Conservation of Nature designates it as critically endangered, as only 203-340 mature individuals are believed to exist.
