= Maevatanana District =

Maevatanana
- Location in Madagascar
- Coordinates: 16°57′S 46°50′E
- Country: Madagascar
- Region: Betsiboka
- District: Maevatanana

Area
  - Total: 10,750 km^{2} (4,150 sq mi)
- Elevation: 70 m (230 ft)

Population (2020 estimate)
  - Total: 236,791
  - Density: 22.03/km^{2} (57.05/sq mi)
- Time zone: UTC3 (EAT)
- Postal code: 412
- Climate: Aw

Maevatanana is a district of Betsiboka in Madagascar.

== Communes ==
The district is further divided into 20 communes:

- Ambalajia
- Ambalanjanakomby
- Ambodimanga
- Andriba
- Antanimbary
- Antsiafabositra
- Beanana, Maevatanana
- Bemokotra
- Beratsimanana
- Berivotra
- Madiromirafy
- Maevatanana
- Maevatanana II
- Mahatsinjo
- Mahazoma
- Mangabe
- Maria
- Marokoro
- Morafeno
- Tsararano

== Mining ==
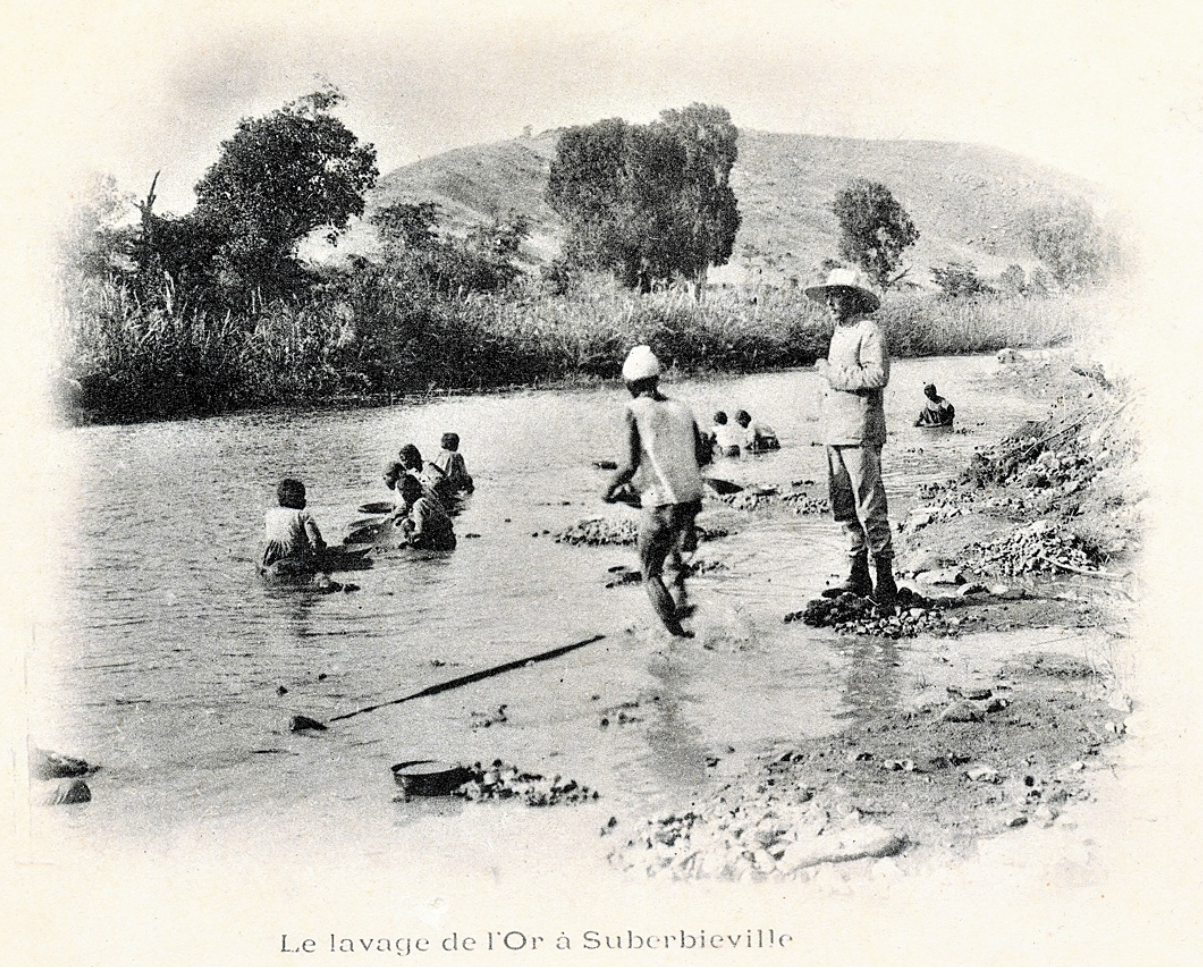
Gold panning in Maevatanana (Suberbieville) around 1900

There are important gold mining operations in the district of Maevatanana where 20 kg of gold are extracted weekly. Particularly the Kamoro River is rich in gold, several dozens of kilogramm are extracted every month in Marokoro.

== Rivers ==
- Kamoro River
