= Tsaratanana District =

Tsaratanana
- District
- Location within Madagascar
- Country: Madagascar
- Region: Betsiboka

Area
  - Total: 12,139 km^{2} (4,687 sq mi)

Population (2020)
  - Total: 152,822
  - Density: 12.589/km^{2} (32.606/sq mi)
- Postal code: 421

Tsaratanana is a district of Betsiboka in Madagascar. The area is 12,139 km^{2} (4,687 sq mi) and the population was estimated to be 152,822 in 2020.

== Communes ==
The district is further divided into ten communes:

- Ambakireny
- Andriamena
- Bekapaika
- Betrandraka
- Brieville
- Keliloha
- Manakana
- Sarobaratra
- Tsararova
- Tsaratanana
