= Ambohitantely Special Reserve =

- IUCN category IV (habitat/species management area)
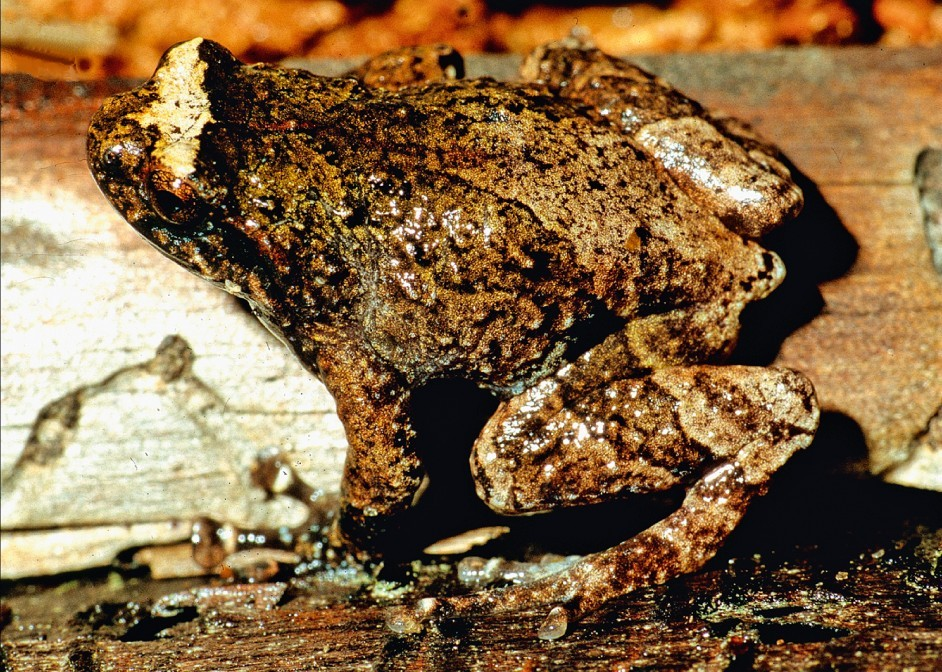
- Anodonthyla vallani is not known outside the Ambohitantely Reserve.

- Location within Madagascar
- Location: Ankazobe, Analamanga, Madagascar
- Coordinates: 18.161°S 47.302°E
- Area: 5,600 ha (14,000 acres)
- Established: 1982

Ambohitantely Special Reserve is a 5,600-hectare (14,000-acre) wildlife reserve of Madagascar.

== Geography ==
This reserve is situated in Analamanga region, 140 km (87 mi) north-west of the town of Antananarivo in the district of Ankazobe. It covers 1,800 ha (4,400 acres) of primary rainforests and 3,800 ha (9,400 acres) of grassland savannah. It consists of several sections of the last primary rainforest, on the high plateau in central Madagascar, along with grasslands, caves and waterfalls, at an altitude of 1,300 metres (4,300 ft) to 1,650 metres (5,410 ft). The mean annual rainfall is 1,823 millimetres (71.8 in). The entrance to the reserve is on route 4, near the village of Arazana and the nearest hotel is at Ankazobe.

The ethnic groups living in and around the reserve are the Betsileo, Betsimisaraka, and Merina peoples.

== Flora and fauna ==
The main habitats of the reserve are primary rainforests and grassland savannah. The black-bark tree, Fanola (Asteropeia amblyocarpa) is registered as critically endangered on the IUCN Red List, and Schizolaena tampoketsana with its twisted fissured trunk is believed to have only 160–370 mature individuals in existence. Sihara palm (Dypsis onilahensis), Manambe palm (Dypsis decipiens), and rosewood (Dalbergia monticola) are all registered as vulnerable species.

Three lemur species are found in the reserve: brown mouse lemur (Microcebus rufus), eastern woolly lemur (Avahi laniger), and common brown lemur (Eulemur fulvus). Rare birds found in the reserve include the Malagasy harrier (Circus macrosceles) and Madagascar ibis (Lophotibis cristata). The frog Anodonthyla vallani is likely occurs only within the reserve.

The reserve is the only known habitat of the critically endangered Darth Vader giant pill millipede (Zoosphaerium darthvaderi).

== Threats ==
The area is threatened with slash-and-burn agriculture and irrigation for rice paddies.
