= Ankazobe =

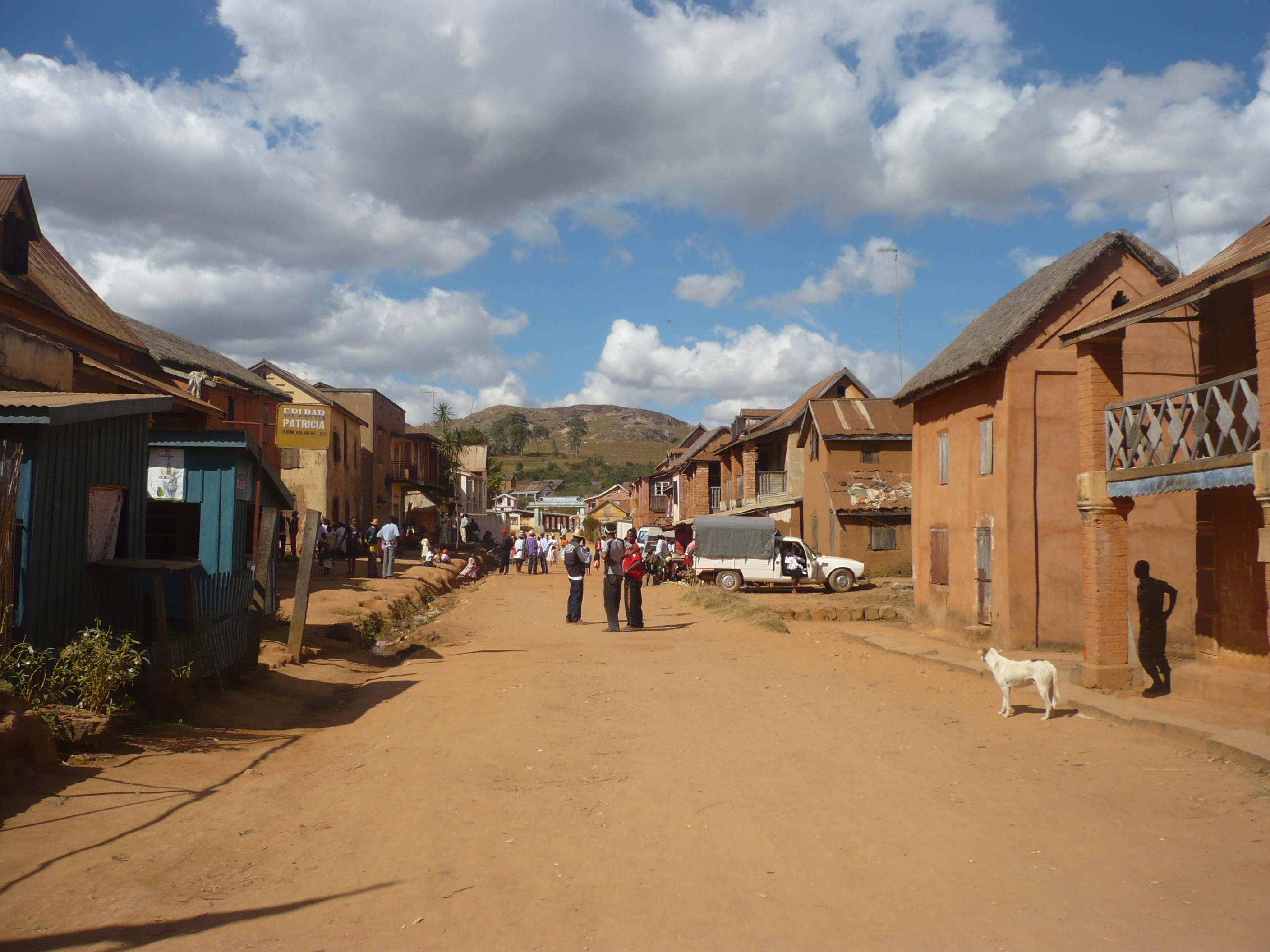

- Location in Madagascar
- Coordinates: 18°31′S 47°11′E
- Country: Madagascar
- Region: Analamanga
- District: Ankazobe
- Time zone: UTC3 (EAT)
- Postal code: 107

Ankazobe is a municipality in Analamanga Region, in the Central Highlands of Madagascar. It is the administrative capital of Ankazobe District and is situated at 75 km north of the capital Antananarivo (94 km by RN 4).

== Infrastructure ==
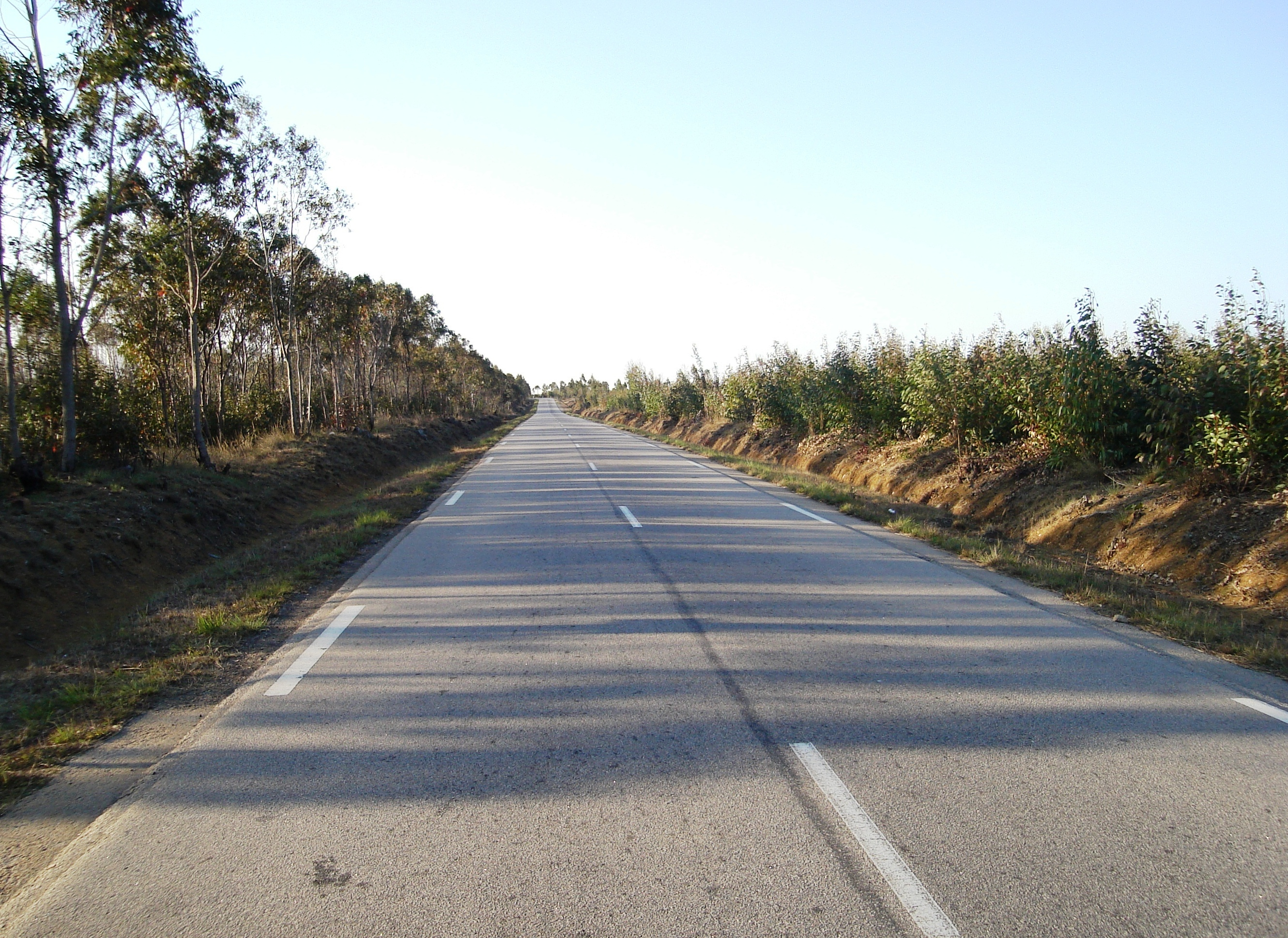
RN 4 near Ankazobe

- Route Nationale 4 from Antananarivo to Mahajanga.
- Route d'Interet Provinciale 40T (RIP 40T) from the RN 4/Ankazobe to Talata-Angavo

== Epidemics ==
In November 2022 the pest had been reported from this municipality.

== Killing of Ankazobe ==
Only few months earlier in August 2022 the killing of Ankazobe took place. 35 people of this village were locked up in a cabin that was set on fire by some dahalo (bandits).

== Nature reserves ==
The Ambohitantely Special Reserve is situated at 30 km in the North-East of the town.

The region of Ankazobe is also home of the critically endangered tree Schizolaena tampoketsana and the frog Anilany helenae.
