= Route nationale 4 (Madagascar) =

Primary highway in Madagascar

Route information
- Length: 570 km (350 mi)

Major junctions
- From: Antananarivo
- Ambondromamy – (junction RN 6)
- To: Mahajanga

Location
- Country: Madagascar

Highway system
- Roads in Madagascar

Route nationale 4 (RN4) is a primary highway in Madagascar. The route runs from the capital city of Antananarivo to Mahajanga, a city on the northeast coast of Madagascar. It covers a distance of 570 km (350 mi).

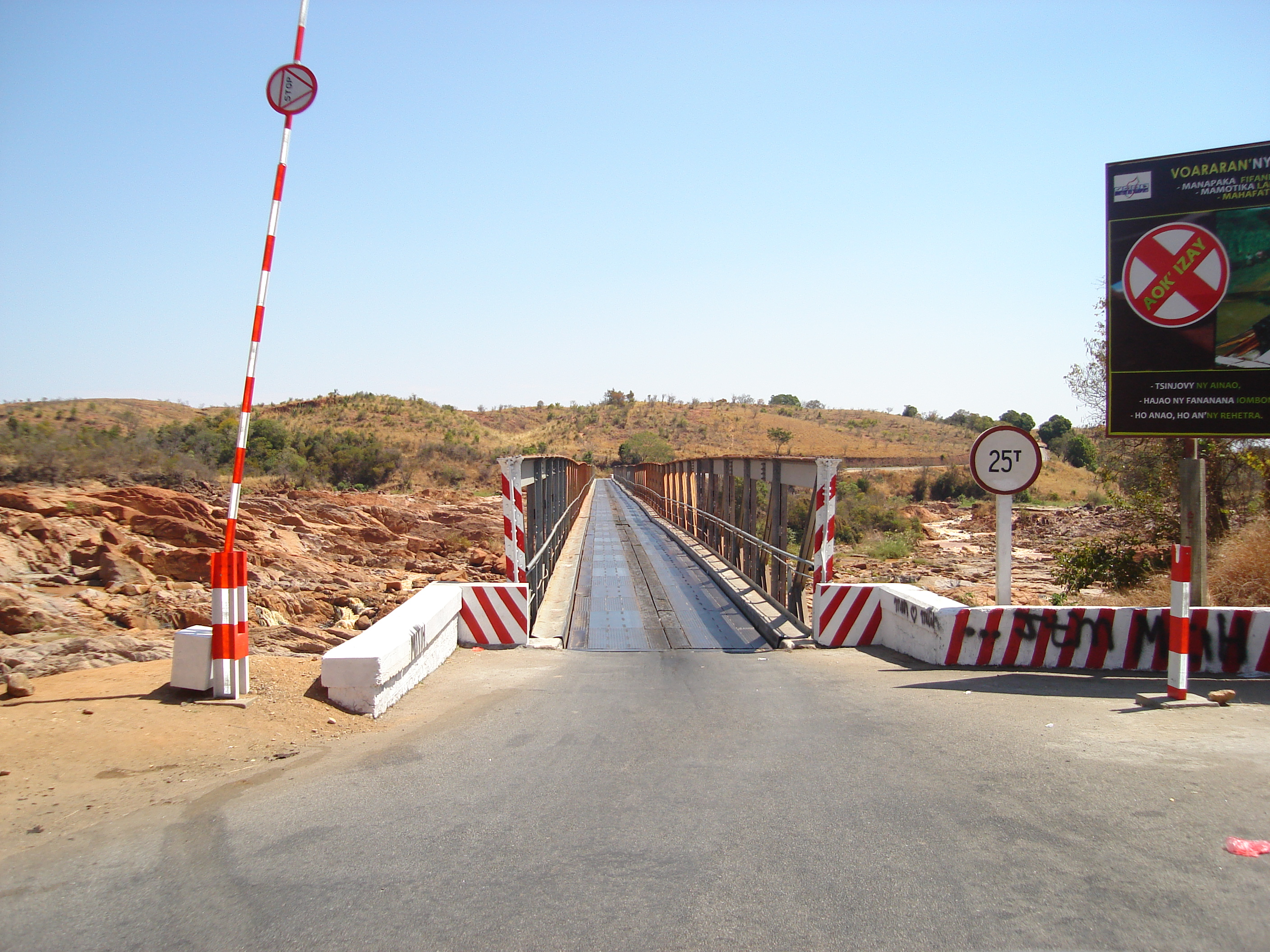
Besiboka Bridge on RN 4

== Selected locations on route (from south to north) ==
- Antananarivo
- Ampanotokana (junction to Morarano/Miantso by the RNT 36)
- Andranovelona (PK 45 km (28 mi) – water power plant & Buddhist temple)
- Ankazobe – (94 km (58 mi) from Antananarivo)
- Ankazosary
- Andranofeno
- Manerinerina
- Ankarambe
- Mahatsinjo
- Andrioa
- Antanimbary
- Andranobevava
- Beanana
- Maevatanana – (329 km (204 mi))
- Andramy
- Bridge over Betsiboka River
- Ambalanjanakomby
- Maromalandy
- Andranomamy
- Mahajamba River – bridge
- Ambondromamy – (junction with RN 6 – 450 km (280 mi))
- Ankarafantsika National Park National Park
- Mahajanga

== See also ==
- List of roads in Madagascar
- Transport in Madagascar
