= Maevatanana =

Maevatanana Suberbieville
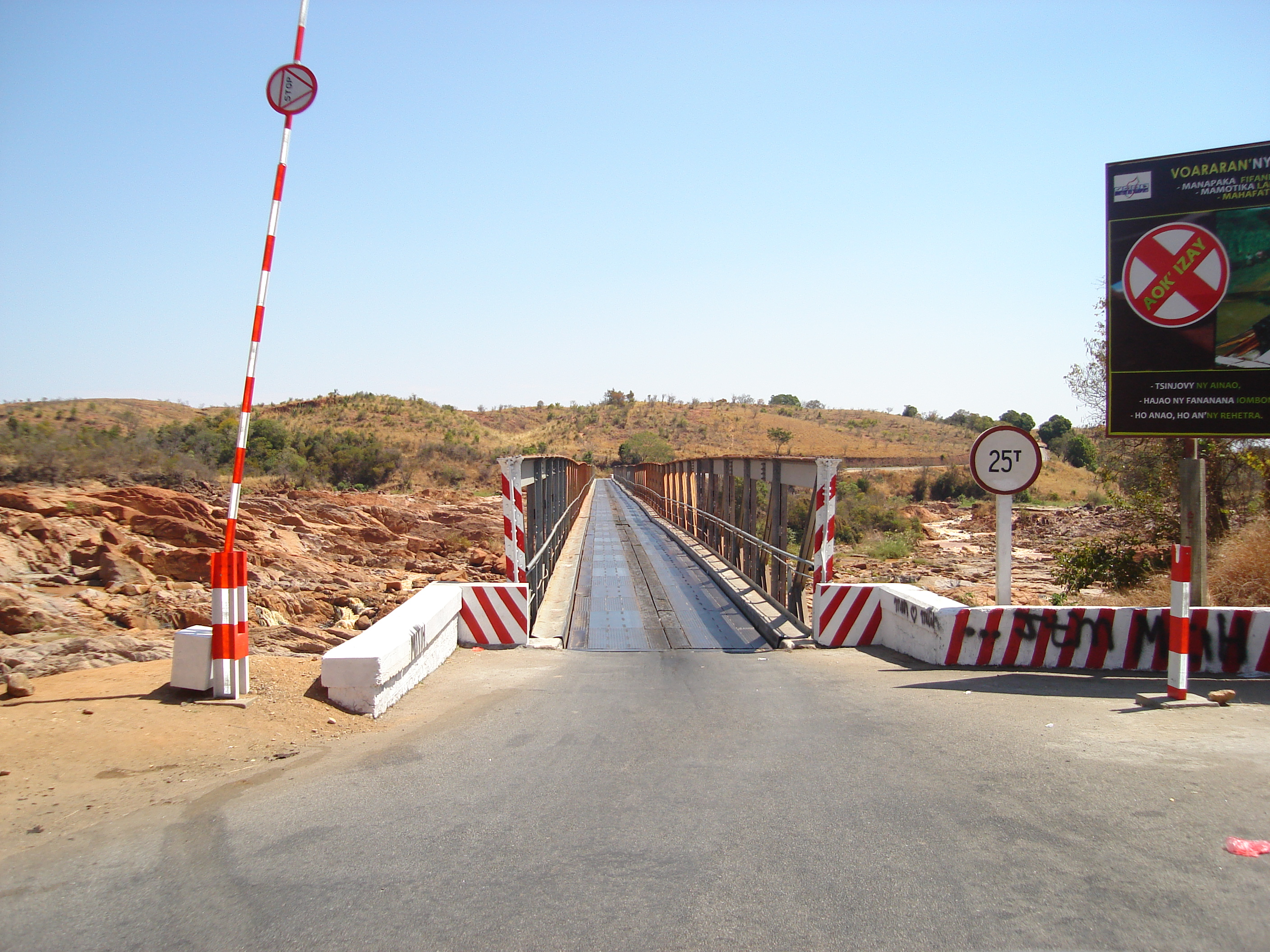
- Betsiboka Bridge, near Maevatanana

- Location in Madagascar
- Coordinates: 16°57′S 46°50′E
- Country: Madagascar
- Region: Betsiboka
- District: Maevatanana

Government

Area
  - Total: 33.1 km^{2} (12.8 sq mi)
- Elevation: 70 m (230 ft)

Population (2018 census)
  - Total: 25,928
  - Density: 783/km^{2} (2,030/sq mi)
- Time zone: UTC3 (EAT)
- Postal code: 412
- Climate: Aw

Maevatanana is an urban municipality in Madagascar. The city is in the central-north part of the island, at the Ikopa River, and is connected by the national road RN 4 to Antananarivo and Mahajanga. The altitude is low and as it is located far from the coast, temperatures tend to be high. The city belongs to the district of Maevatanana, which is a part of Betsiboka Region. Maevatanana is the capital of the Betsiboka region, and the population of the commune was estimated to be approximately 24,000 in 2001 commune census.

In addition to primary schooling the town offers secondary education at both junior and senior levels. Maevatanana hosts the annex of the University Institute of Management and Administration (IUGM) of the University of Mahajanga.

The town has a permanent court and hospital. The majority 60% of the population of the commune are farmers, while an additional 7% receive their livelihood from raising livestock. The most important crops are rice and tobacco; also sweet potatoes are an important agricultural product. Industry and services provide employment for 5% and 15% of the population, respectively. Additionally fishing employs 13% of the population.

== Infrastructure ==
- Route Nationale 4 from Antananarivo (329 km) to Mahajanga (249 km).

== Rivers ==
Maevatanana lies between the Ikopa River and the Betsiboka River.

== Mining ==
There are important gold mining operations near the town where 20 kgs of gold are extracted weekly.
