= Betsiboka =

Coordinates: 16°57′00″S 46°49′48″E

Betsiboka Region
- Region
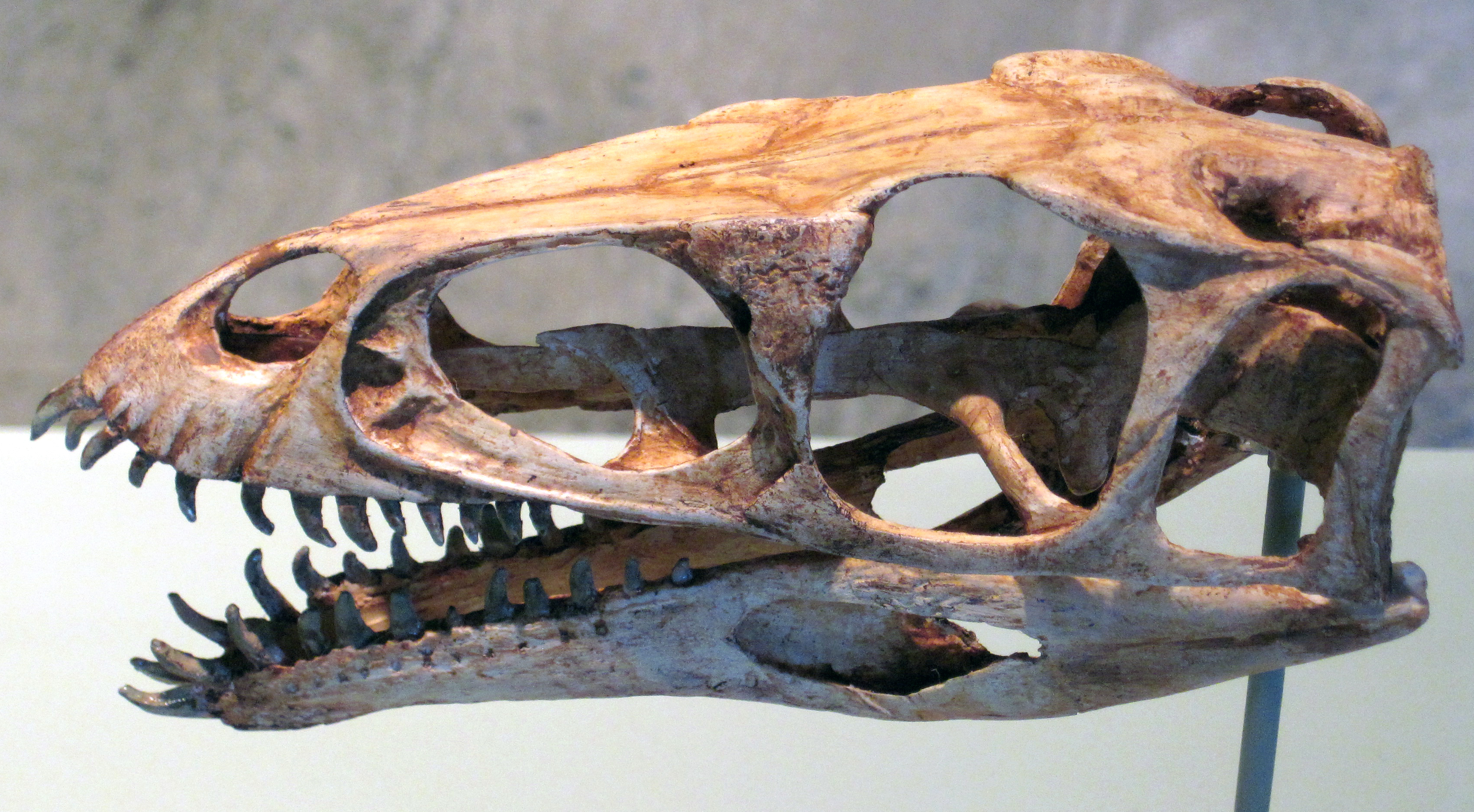
- Fossils found near Berivotra, Betsiboka

- Location in Madagascar
- Country: Madagascar
- Capital: Maevatanana

Government
  - Gouverneur: Jean Roger Randrianjafinindrina

Area
  - Total: 30,025 km^{2} (11,593 sq mi)

Population (2018)
  - Total: 394,561
  - Density: 13.141/km^{2} (34.035/sq mi)
- Time zone: UTC3 (EAT)
- HDI (2018): 0.465 low · 15th of 22

Betsiboka is a region of Madagascar. It borders Boeny Region in north, Sofia in northeast, Alaotra-Mangoro in east, Analamanga and Bongolava in south and Melaky in west. The capital of the region is Maevatanana. Until 2009 Betsiboka belonged to Mahajanga Province. The population was 394,561 in 2018 within the area of 30,025 km^{2} (11,593 sq mi). Betsiboka is one of the least densely populated regions in Madagascar.

== Administrative divisions ==
Betsiboka Region is divided into three districts, which are sub-divided into 37 communes.

- Kandreho District – 7 communes
- Maevatanana District – 20 communes
- Tsaratanana District – 10 communes

== Transport ==
=== Airport ===
- Tsaratanana Airport

== Protected Area ==
- The Kasijy Reserve is located in this region.

== See also ==
- Betsiboka Bridge
- Betsiboka River
