= Ikalamavony =

- Location in Madagascar
- Coordinates: 21°09′S 46°35′E
- Country: Madagascar
- Region: Haute Matsiatra
- District: Ikalamavony

Area
  - Total: 1,225 km^{2} (473 sq mi)
- Elevation: 799 m (2,621 ft)

Population (2018)
  - Total: 35,114
  - Metro density: 12.7/km^{2} (33/sq mi)
- Time zone: UTC3 (EAT)
- Postal code: 314

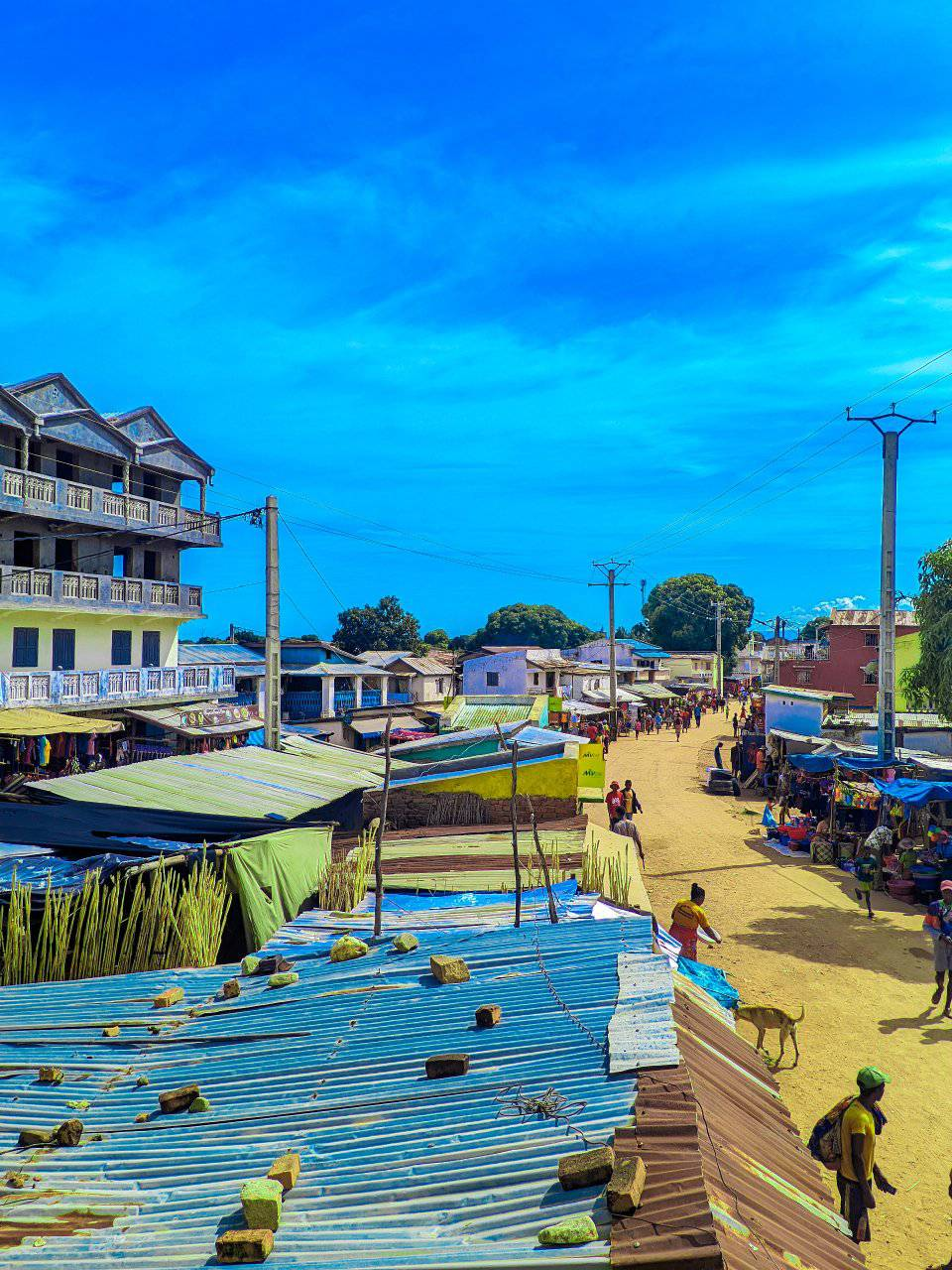
An-tsena Ikalamavony

Ikalamavony is a small town in Haute Matsiatra region, in the hills of southern central Madagascar with a population of 35,114 in 2018. It is the capital of the district.

== Demographics ==
According to the 2018 General Census of Population and Housing, the commune of Ikalamavony had a population of 35,114. The population is predominantly rural and young, with a median age estimated at 18 years. The population density is low, reflecting the rural and mountainous character of the area.

Ethnically, the population is mostly composed of the Betsileo (approximately 75–90%), followed by the Bara (10–25%) and the Antandroy (5–10%). A notable subgroup in the region is known as the Bara bory, which represents a cultural and social blend of Betsileo and Bara heritage.

== Economy ==
The economy of Ikalamavony is primarily based on agro-pastoral activities, especially zebu cattle herding. Artisanal mining is also an important source of income for the local population.

The Bevaondrano area, located about 25 km west of the main town, is known for its two major granite pegmatite deposits, rich in gemstones. Among the minerals found are fluoro-liddicoatite, a rare variety of tourmaline known for its vivid pink and green hues, as well as sapphires and garnets. These are highly valued both by collectors and in the jewelry market.

Mining is mostly artisanal and informal, attracting workers from surrounding areas. Although it contributes significantly to the local economy, it remains largely unregulated and presents sustainability challenges.

== Communes ==
To the district of Ikalamavony also belong the communes:

- Ambatomainty - (45 km from Ikalamavony)
- Fitampito - (50 km from Ikalamavony)
- Ikalamavony
- Mangidy - (35 km from Ikalamavony)
- Solila - (46 km from Ikalamavony)
- Tanamarina Sakay
- Tanamarina (also named Tanamarina Bekisopa)
- Tsitondroina

== Roads ==
The partly unpaved National road 42 links the town to Isorana and Fianarantsoa (90 km).

== Rivers ==
Matsiatra in the North, and the Mananantanana river in the South.
