= Vohibato District =

Vohibato
- District
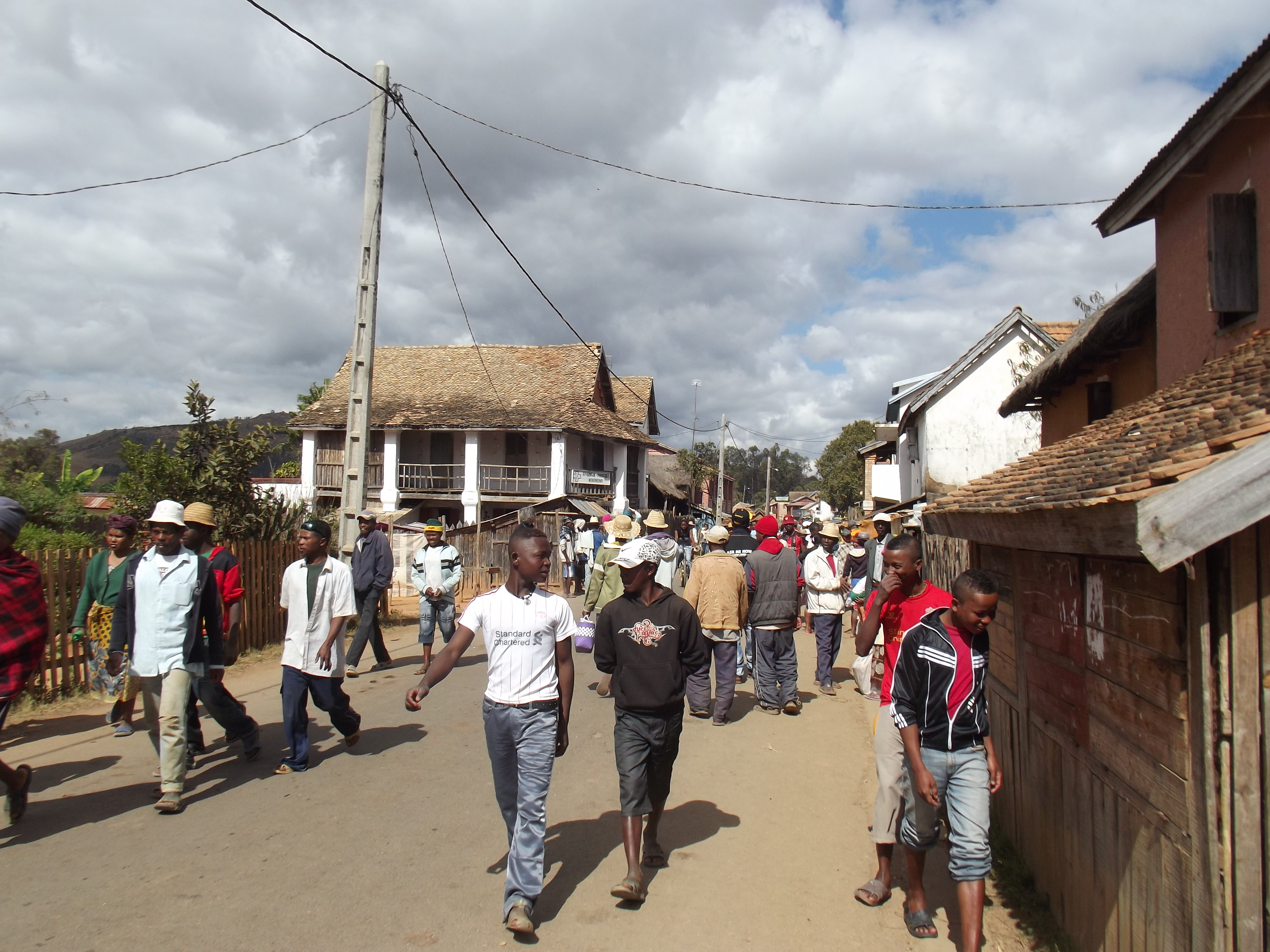
- at Talata Ampano

- Location within Madagascar
- Coordinates: 21°36′S 47°21′E
- Country: Madagascar
- Region: Haute Matsiatra

Area
  - Land: 1,251 sq mi (3,239 km^{2})

Population (2018)
  - Total: 222.629
- Postal code: 305

Vohibato is a district of Haute Matsiatra in Madagascar.

== Communes ==
The district is further divided into 15 communes:

- Alakamisy Itenina
- Andranomiditra
- Andranovorivato
- Ankaromalaza Mifanasoa
- Ihazoara
- Lamosina
- Mahaditra
- Mahasoabe
- Maneva
- Soaindrana
- Talata Ampano
- Vinanitelo
- Vohibato Ouest
- Vohimarina
- Vohitrafeno

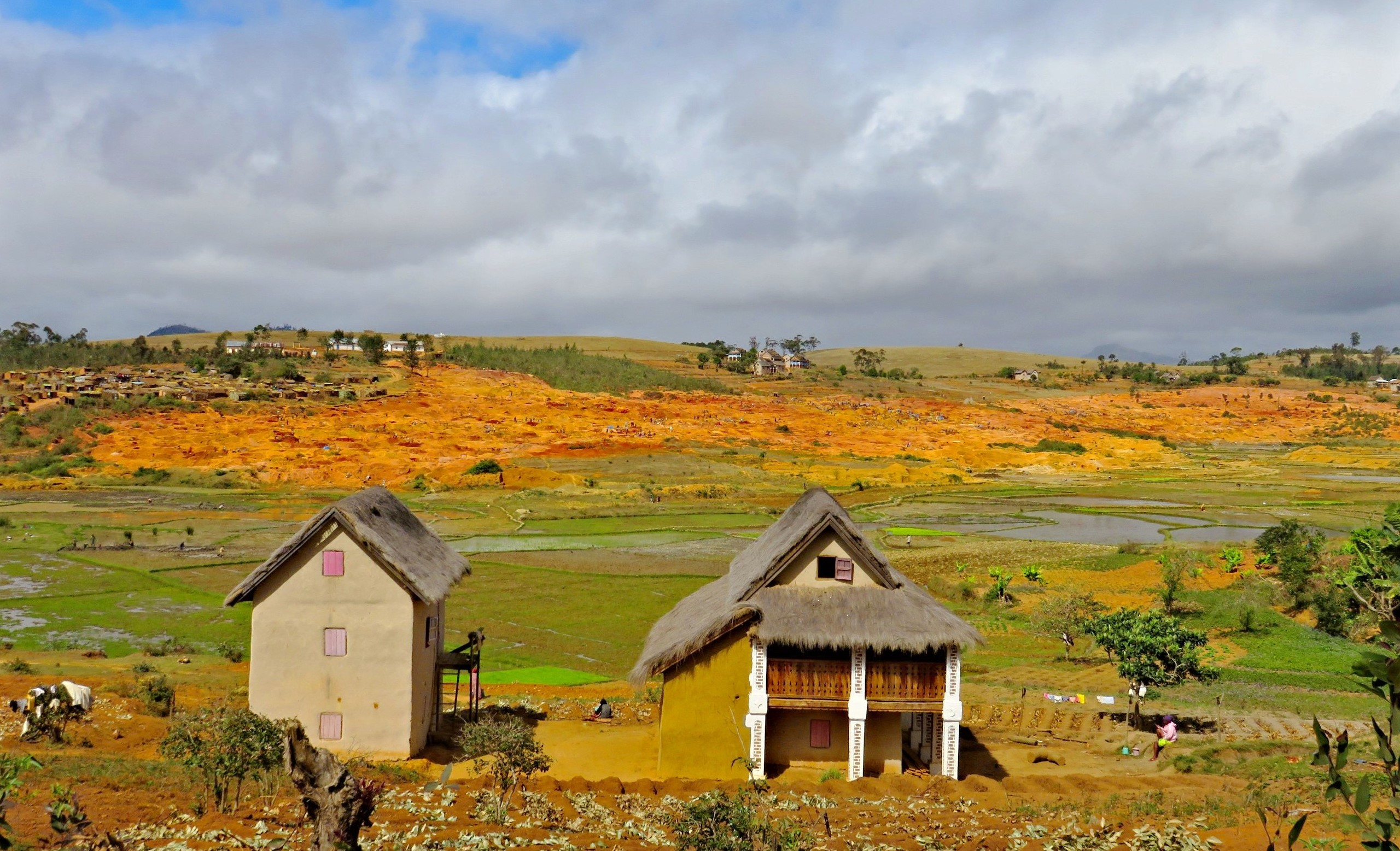
near Mahaditra

== Roads ==
This district is crossed by the National road 7 from the North (Fianarantsoa) to the South (direction Ihosy).

== Protected areas ==
- Part of the Ambositra-Vondrozo Forest Corridor, a protected harmonious landscape
- Part of Ranomafana National Park.
