= Lalangina District =

Lalangina
- District
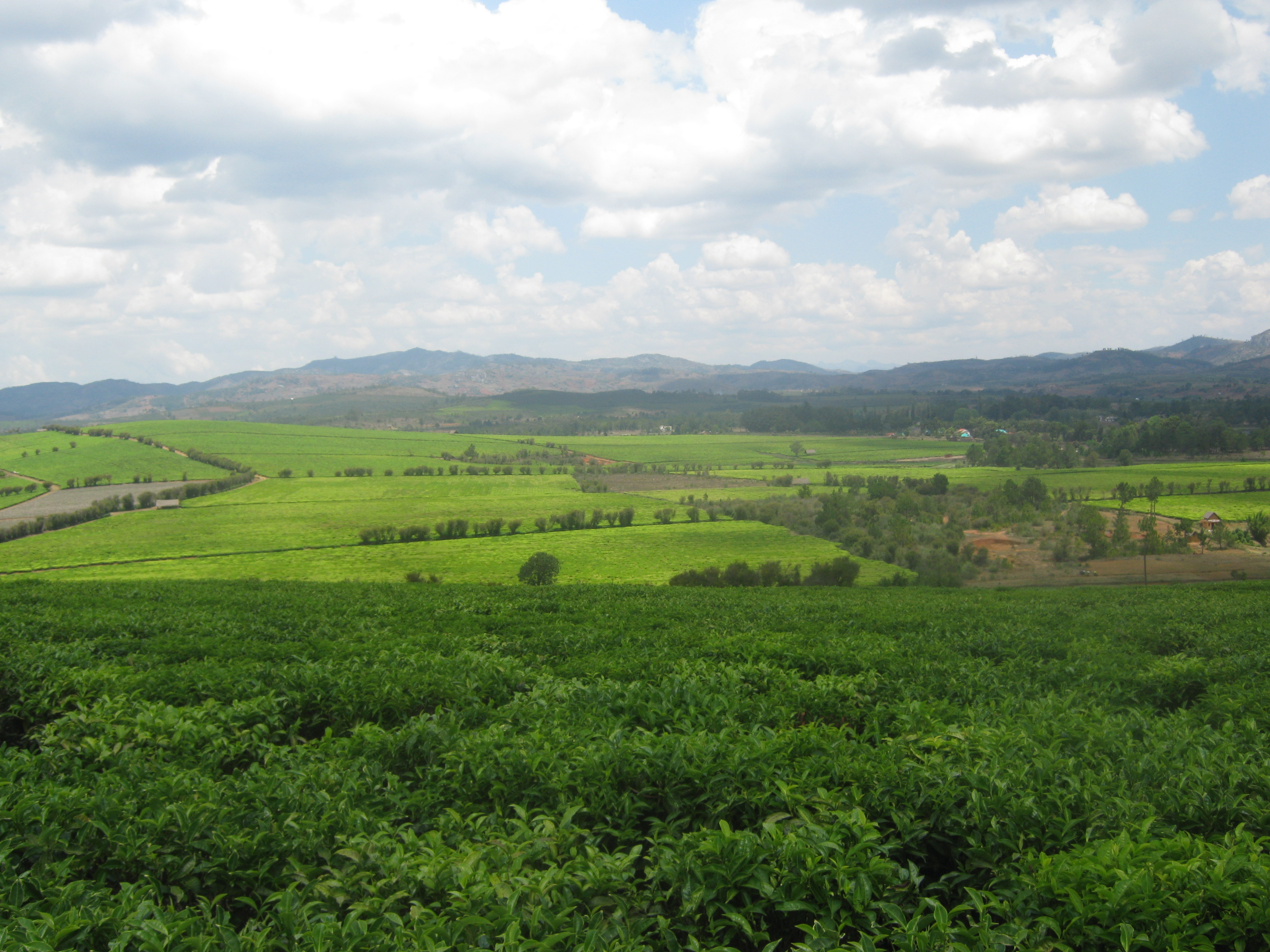
- tea plantations at Sahambavy

- Location within Madagascar
- Coordinates: 21°26′S 47°17′E
- Country: Madagascar
- Region: Haute Matsiatra

Population (2018)
  - Total: 222,629
- Postal code: 303

Lalangina is a district of Haute Matsiatra in Madagascar.

== Communes ==
The district is further divided into 13 communes:

- Alakamisy Ambohimaha
- Alatsinainy Ialamarina
- Ambalakely
- Ambalamahasoa
- Andrainjato Centre
- Andrainjato Est
- Androy, Fianarantsoa
- Fandrandava
- Ialananindro
- Ivoamba
- Mahatsinjony
- Sahambavy
- Taindambo

== Lakes ==
- Lake Sahambavy
