= Ikalamavony District =

Ikalamavony (district)
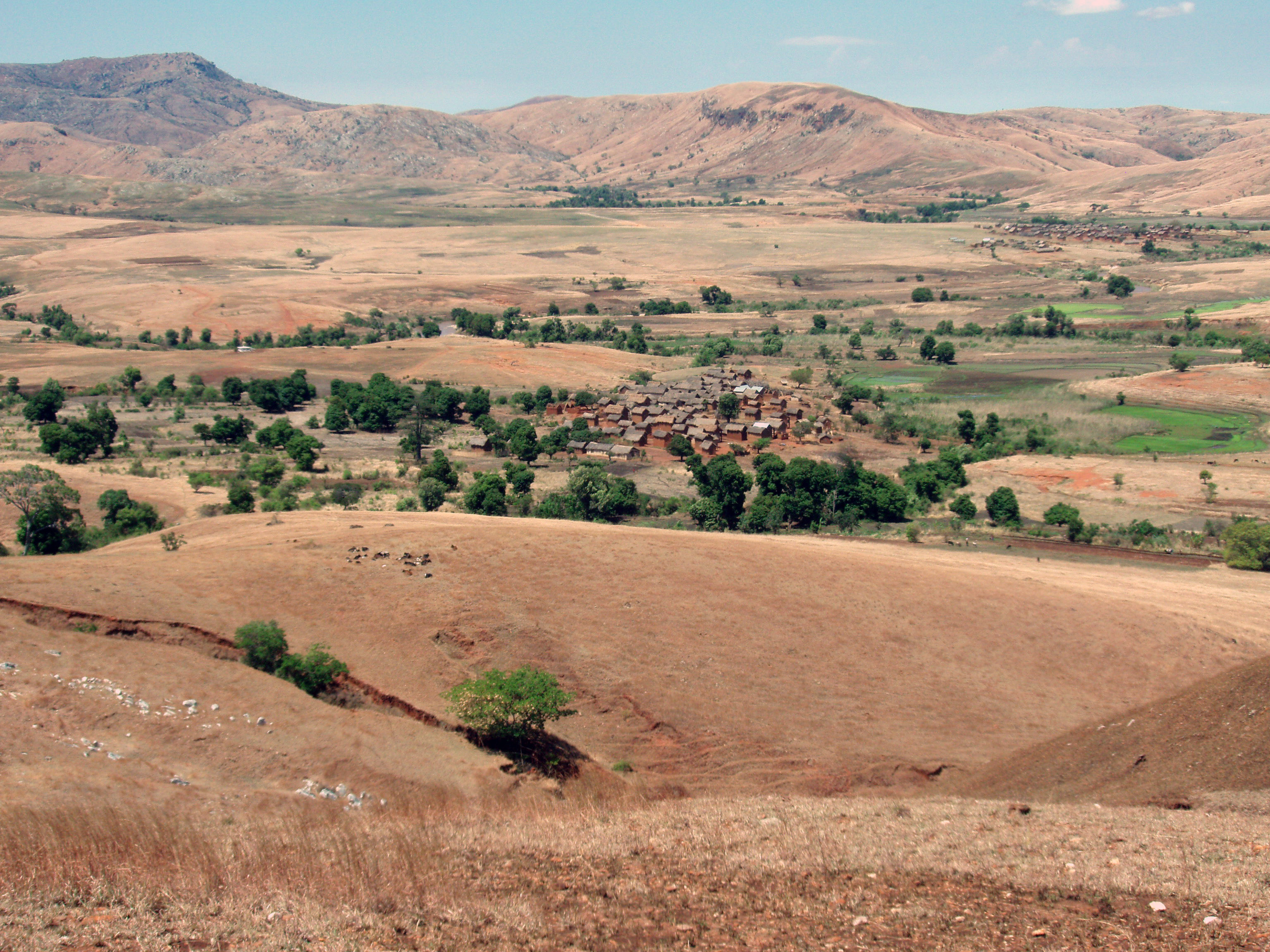
- Anosivola, a fokontany of Mangidy

- Location in Madagascar
- Coordinates: 21°09′S 46°35′E
- Country: Madagascar
- Region: Haute Matsiatra
- District: Ikalamavony

Area
  - Total: 10,163 km^{2} (3,924 sq mi)
- Elevation: 799 m (2,621 ft)

Population (2018)
  - Total: 151,056
- Time zone: UTC3 (EAT)
- Postal code: 314

Ikalamavony is a district and a small town in Haute Matsiatra region, in the hills of southern central Madagascar with a population of 35,114 in 2018. The district has a total population of 151,056 inhabitants. With 10,163 km2 it occupies almost half of the surface of Haute Matsiatra. The capital of the district is Ikalamavony.

== Geography ==
The district is situated at 96 km north-west of Fianarantsoa. Its main town, Ikalamavony is situated on the National road 42.

== Communes ==
The district is further divided into eight communes:

- Ambatomainty - (45 km from Ikalamavony)
- Fitampito - (50 km from Ikalamavony)
- Ikalamavony
- Mangidy - (35 km from Ikalamavony)
- Solila - (46 km from Ikalamavony)
- Tanamarina Sakay
- Tanamarina (also named Tanamarina Bekisopa)
- Tsitondroina

== Roads ==
The partly unpaved National road 42 links the town to Isorana and Fianarantsoa (90 km).

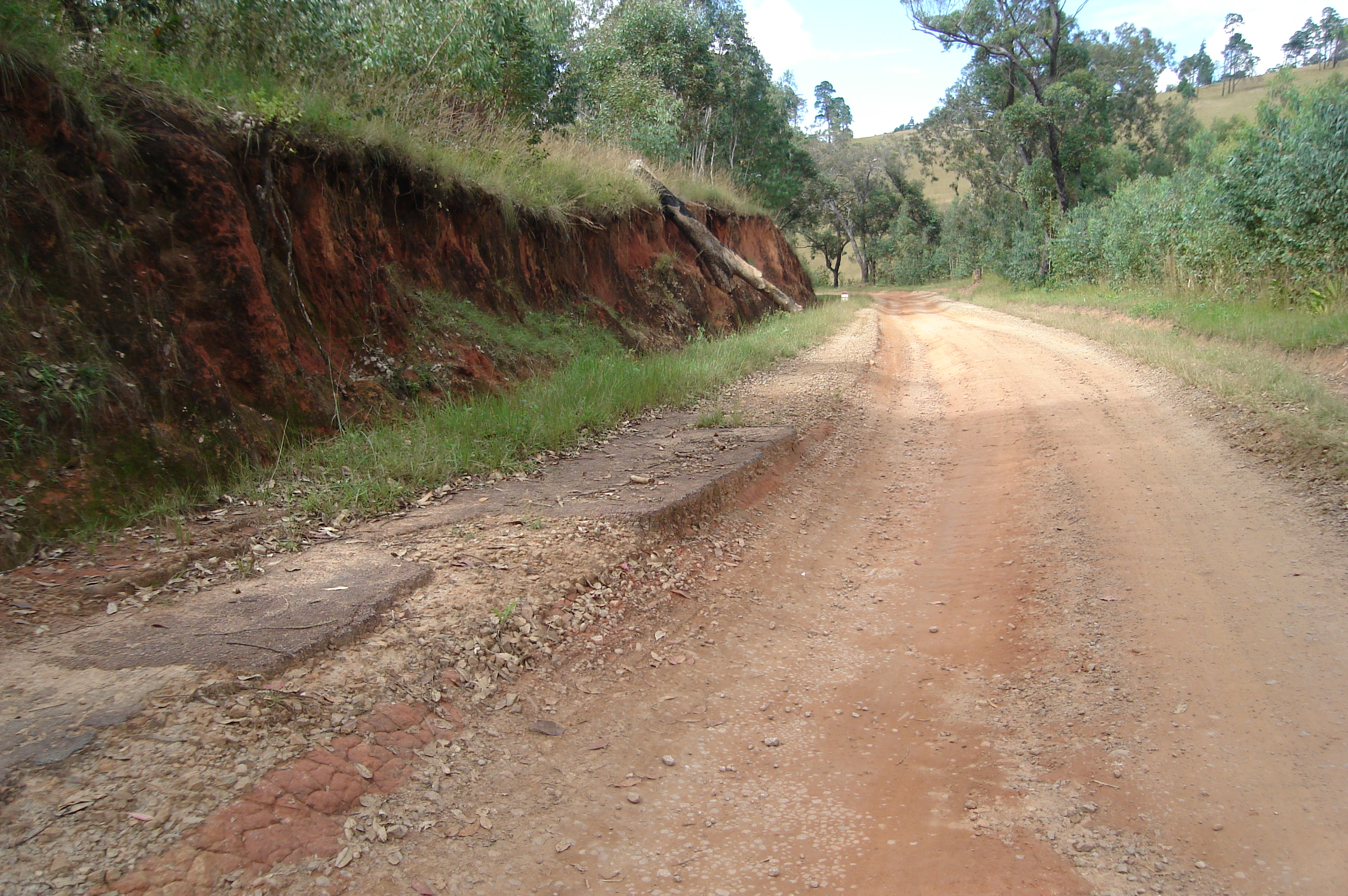
Madagascar National Road 42

== Rivers ==
Matsiatra in the North, and the Mananantanana river in the South cross the district. The Zomandao river is another river of importance.
