= Bekisopa =

- Village
- Location in Madagascar
- Coordinates: 21°39′S 45°53′E
- Country: Madagascar
- Region: Haute Matsiatra
- District: Ikalamavony
- Elevation: 750 m (2,460 ft)
- Time zone: UTC3 (EAT)
- Postal code: 314

Bekisopa is a village in the region of Haute Matsiatra in central Madagascar. It is part of the municipality of Tanamarina. The village is notable for a rich nearby iron mine, which is entirely owned by Australian mining company Akora Resources Limited. The mine hosts an estimated 194.7 million tons of iron ore, with over four million tons of iron ore having been extracted. Over $3.8 million has been used to secure additional resources.
