= Ialananindro =

Ialananindro Sendrinialina
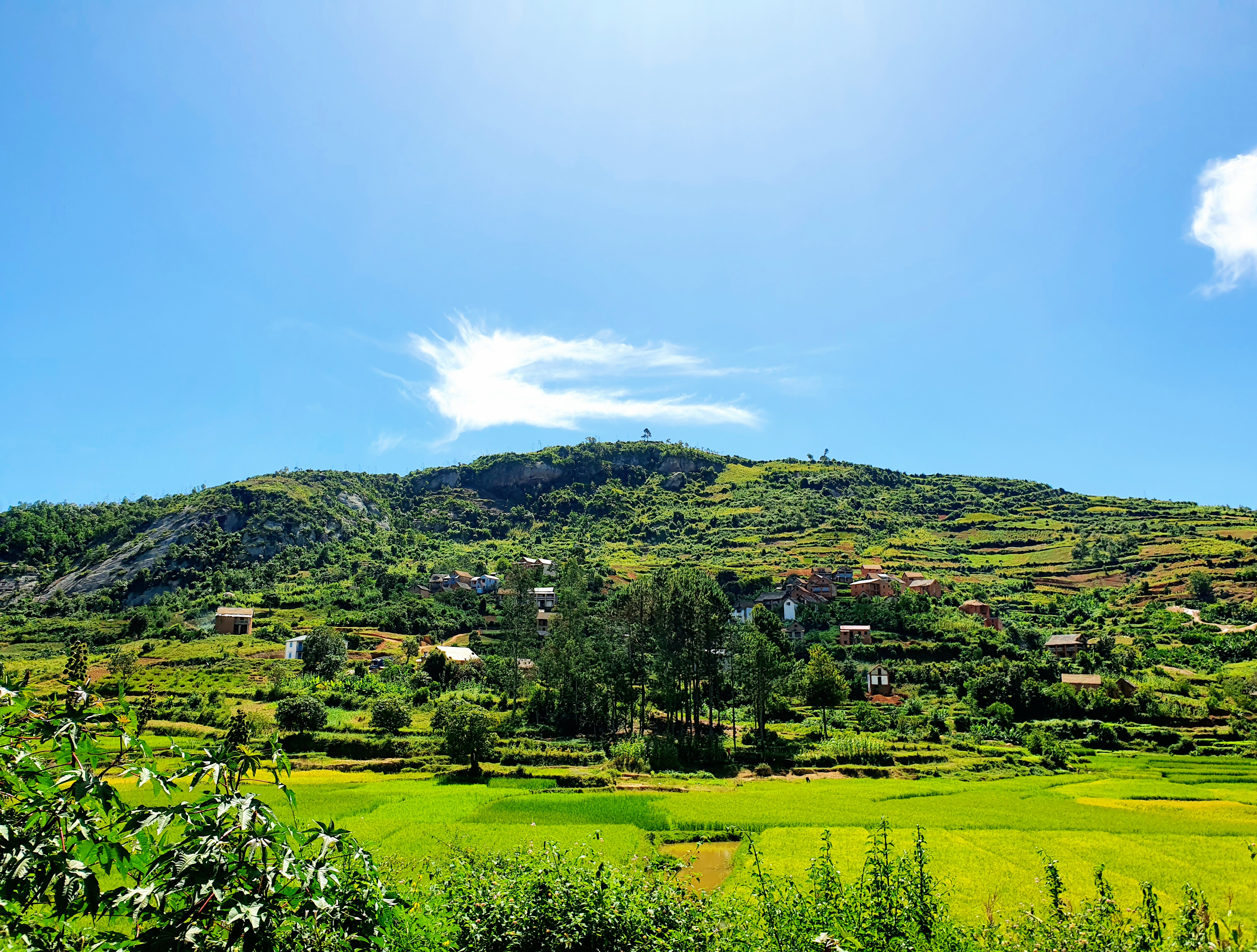
- Ialananindro

- Location in Madagascar
- Coordinates: 21°25′S 47°08′E
- Country: Madagascar
- Region: Haute Matsiatra
- District: Lalangina

Area
  - Land: 27 km^{2} (10 sq mi)
- Elevation: 1,136 m (3,727 ft)

Population (2018)
  - Total: 6,554
- Time zone: UTC3 (EAT)
- Postal code: 302

Ialananindro is a rural municipality in Madagascar. It belongs to the district of Lalangina, which is a part of Haute Matsiatra Region. It has four villages in the municipality, which are : Sendrinalina - Tetezambato - Antsoibe and Ampasakambana.

The population of this municipality was 6554 in 2018. Primary and junior level secondary education are available in town. The majority, 76.5%, of the population of the commune are farmers, while an additional 12% receives their livelihood from raising livestock. The most important crop is rice, while other important products are cassava, sweet potatoes and potatoes. Industry and services provide employment for 10% and 1% of the population, respectively. Additionally, fishing employs 0.5% of the population.

== Geography ==
This municipality is situated at 8 km East of Fianarantsoa on the National road 7 on the Matsiatra river.
