= Vohimarina =

Coordinates: 21°38′24″S 46°53′56″E

- Interactive map of Vohimarina
- Country: Madagascar
- Region: Haute Matsiatra
- District: Vohibato District

Population (2018)
  - Total: 12,559
- Time zone: UTC3 (EAT)
- Postal code: 305

Vohimarina (formerly: Vohimarina Lamosina) is a village and commune in Madagascar. It belongs to the district of Vohibato District, which is a part of Haute Matsiatra Region. The population of the commune was estimated 12559 in 2018.

Vohimarina was formerly known as Vohimarina Lamosina but Lamosina has become an independent rural commune.

Vohimarina is situated 26 km from Fianarantsoa, the nearest town and capital of the Betsileo, in the centre of Madagascar Island, in The Hauts Plateaux ("High Lands") and 450 km from Antananarivo, the capital.

== Overview ==
Vohimarina (literally "flat mountain") and Lamosina (literally "back") are two villages separated by a few miles walking distance. The origin of the name Vohimarina came from the mountain made of a huge rock dominating the village. This mountain has a strange layout of having a flat surface on its top. It has a mysterious long and tubular shape like a beast with a huge bump and a queue (150–200 m high, 700 m length, 70 m width). The front of the rock represents a face of an animal facing the village located down to the west direction. This rock is seen from a radius of 10 km and Lamosina is the farthest village seen from the top of the mountain.

One can reach Vohimarina only through a 4 x 4 wheel car and follow the national Road RN7 [direction South to Tulear]. From Fianarantsoa, one must pass Mahazengy, Soaindrana, Talata Ampano and upon reaching Andranovorivato one must turn right where the road is no longer asphalted. From Andranovorivato, Vohimarina is approximately 12 kilometres away and the duration of travel is 45 minutes/one hour.

Vohimarina is made of typical Malagasy houses that surround the Place du Marche [Market Place]. The market day is Sabotsy (Saturday) and therefore Vohimarina is nicknamed Sabotsy.

The Vohimarina Rock [mountain] has been for many years subject of angano (myths), tantara (stories), and fady (taboos) in Malagasy oral culture. It is potentially an attraction for tourists and mainly for those involved in trekking and walk, but still need to be explored [climbing the mountain need an inhabitant's help and guide]. Le Programme Regional de Developpement [Regional Plan for Development]is aiming to protect areas presenting "fauna and flora in danger" in the Haute Mahatsiatra. Vohimarina Lamosina is classified in " ZONES DE CONSERVATIONS NATURELLES" (=AREAS OF NATURAL CONSERVATION) that is filed under "RELIQUE DE FORET NATURELLE SERVANT D'HABITAT A DES LEMURIENS" (translated: REMAINING OF NATURAL FOREST USED BY LEMURS AS HABITAT)

Primary and junior level secondary education are available at Vohimarina. The majority 98% of the population of the commune are farmers. The most important crops are rice and beans, while other important agricultural products are peanuts and cassava. Services provide employment for 2% of the population.
