= Mangidy =

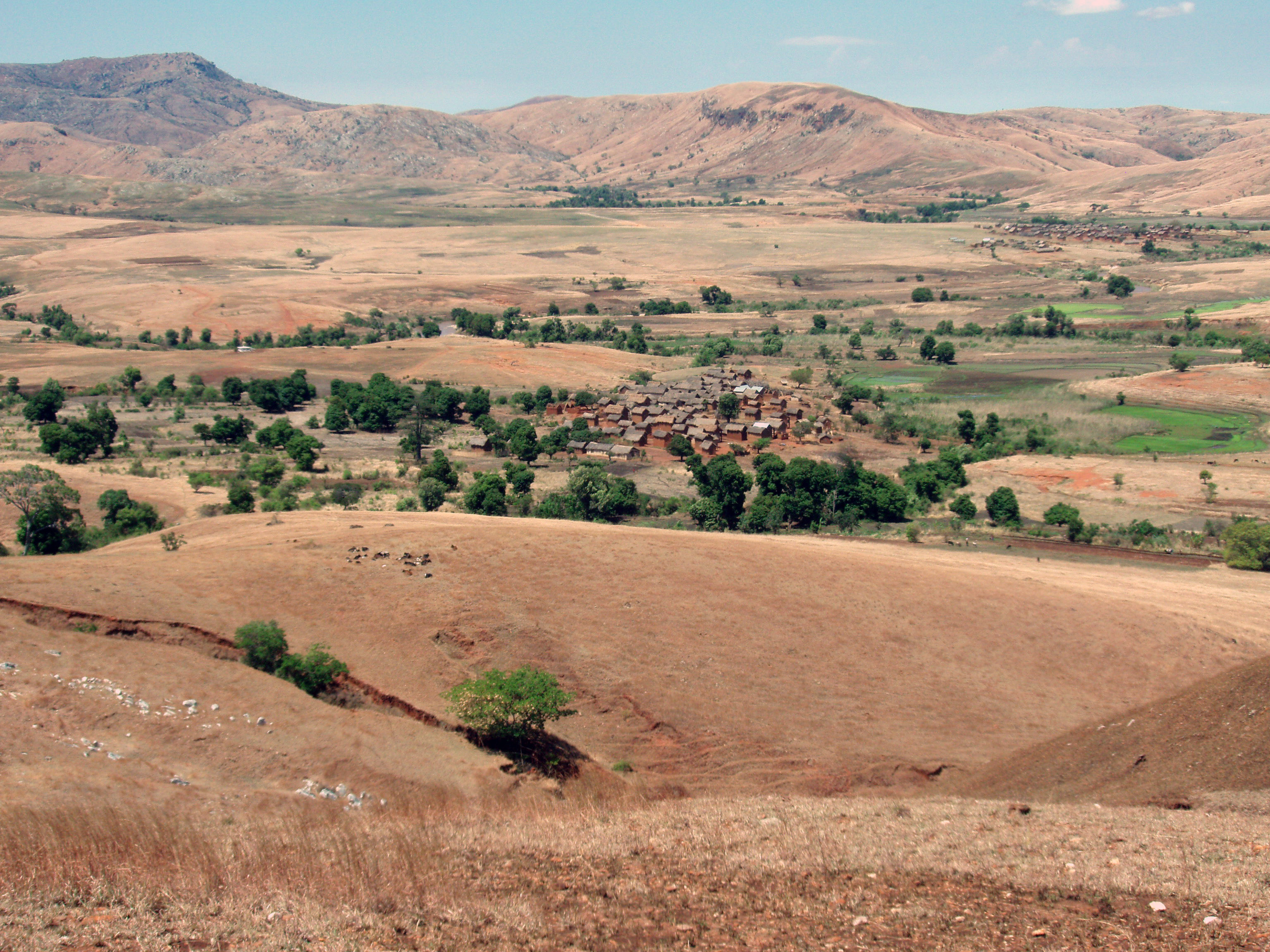
- Anosivola, a fokontany of Mangidy

- Location in Madagascar
- Coordinates: 21°15′S 46°48′E
- Country: Madagascar
- Region: Haute Matsiatra
- District: Ikalamavony
- Elevation: 1,248 m (4,094 ft)

Population (2018)
  - Total: 23,033
- Time zone: UTC3 (EAT)
- Postal code: 314

Mangidy is a rural municipality in Madagascar. It belongs to the district of Ikalamavony, which is a part of Haute Matsiatra Region. The population of the commune was estimated to be approximately 23,033 in 2018.

Primary and junior level secondary education are available in town. The majority 60% of the population of the commune are farmers, while an additional 39.9% receives their livelihood from raising livestock. The most important crops are rice and beans, while other important agricultural products are maize and cassava. Services provide employment for 0.1% of the population.

== Roads ==
The partly unpaved National road 42 links the town to Isorana and Fianarantsoa.

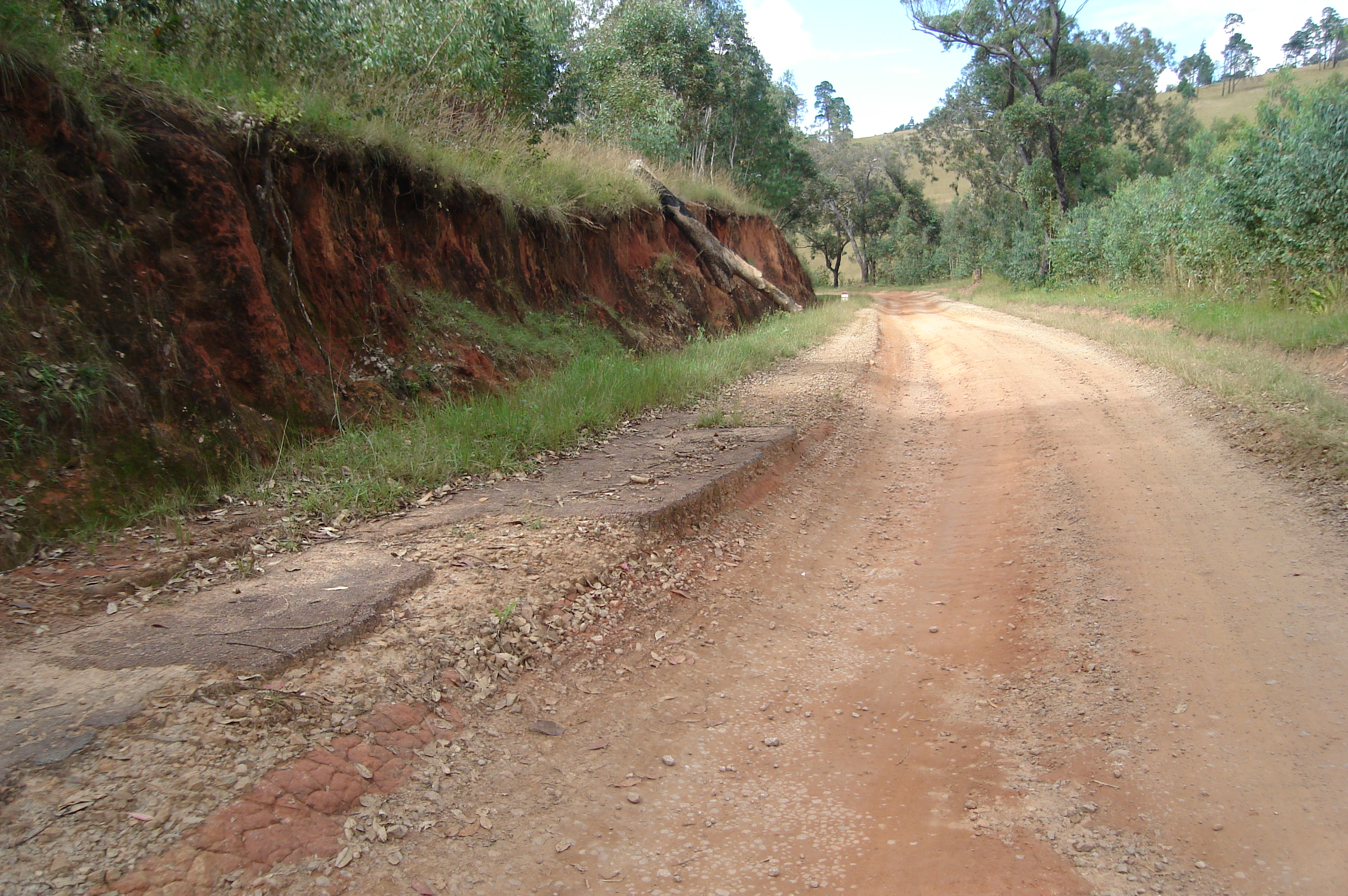
Madagascar National Road 42
