= Ankaramena, Ambalavao =

Ankaramena
- Location in Madagascar
- Coordinates: 21°56′S 46°38′E
- Country: Madagascar
- Region: Haute Matsiatra
- District: Ambalavao
- Elevation: 905 m (2,969 ft)

Population (2001)
  - Total: 7,000
- Time zone: UTC3 (EAT)

Ankaramena is a town and commune in Madagascar. It belongs to the district of Ambalavao, which is a part of Haute Matsiatra Region. The population of the commune was estimated to be approximately 7,000 in 2001 commune census.

Primary and junior level secondary education are available in town. The majority 70% of the population of the commune are farmers, while an additional 25% receives their livelihood from raising livestock. The most important crops are rice and cassava; also maize is an important agricultural product. Services provide employment for 5% of the population.
