= Fenoarivo mine =

Iron ore mine in Haute Matsiatra, Madagascar

- Location: Fenoarivo, Ambalavao, Haute Matsiatra, Madagascar
- Products: Iron ore

The Fenoarivo mine is a large iron mine located in central Madagascar in Haute Matsiatra, near Fenoarivo, Ambalavao. Fenoarivo represents one of the largest iron ore reserves in Madagascar and in the world having estimated reserves of 100 million tonnes of ore grading 40% iron metal.

== See also ==
- Mining industry of Madagascar
