= Iarintsena =

- Location in Madagascar
- Coordinates: 21°49′S 46°52′E
- Country: Madagascar
- Region: Haute Matsiatra
- District: Ambalavao
- Elevation: 1,011 m (3,317 ft)

Population (2001)
  - Total: 22,000
- Time zone: UTC3 (EAT)
- Postal code: 303

Iarintsena is a rural municipality in the Central Highlands of Madagascar. It belongs to the district of Ambalavao, which is a part of Haute Matsiatra Region. The population of the commune was estimated to be approximately 22,000 in 2001.

Only primary schooling is available. The majority 80% of the population of the commune are farmers, while an additional 14% receives their livelihood from raising livestock. The most important crop is rice, while other important products are cassava and tobacco. Services provide employment for 5% of the population. Additionally fishing employs 1% of the population.

== Sports ==
- FC Mananantanana (football)
