= Ambinanindovoka =

- Location in Madagascar
- Coordinates: 21°55′S 47°6′E
- Country: Madagascar
- Region: Haute Matsiatra
- District: Ambalavao
- Elevation: 1,029 m (3,376 ft)

Population (2001)
  - Total: 11,000
- Time zone: UTC3 (EAT)

Ambinanindovoka is a rural commune in the Central Highlands of Madagascar. It belongs to the district of Ambalavao, which is a part of Haute Matsiatra Region. The population of the commune was estimated to be approximately 11,000 in 2001 commune census.

Primary and junior level secondary education are available in town. The majority 90% of the population of the commune are farmers, while an additional 8% receives their livelihood from raising livestock. The most important crop is rice, while other important products are beans, maize and tobacco. Services provide employment for 2% of the population.
