= Miarinarivo, Ambalavao =

Miarinarivo
- Location in Madagascar
- Coordinates: 22°5′S 47°3′E
- Country: Madagascar
- Region: Haute Matsiatra
- District: Ambalavao
- Elevation: 1,080 m (3,540 ft)

Population (2001)
  - Total: 10,000
- Time zone: UTC3 (EAT)

Miarinarivo is a town and commune in Madagascar. It belongs to the district of Ambalavao, which is a part of Haute Matsiatra Region. The population of the commune was estimated to be approximately 10,000 in 2001 commune census.

Only primary schooling is available. The majority 99% of the population of the commune are farmers. The most important crop is rice, while other important products are cassava, sweet potatoes and tobacco. Services provide employment for 1% of the population.
