= Ambohimahamasina =

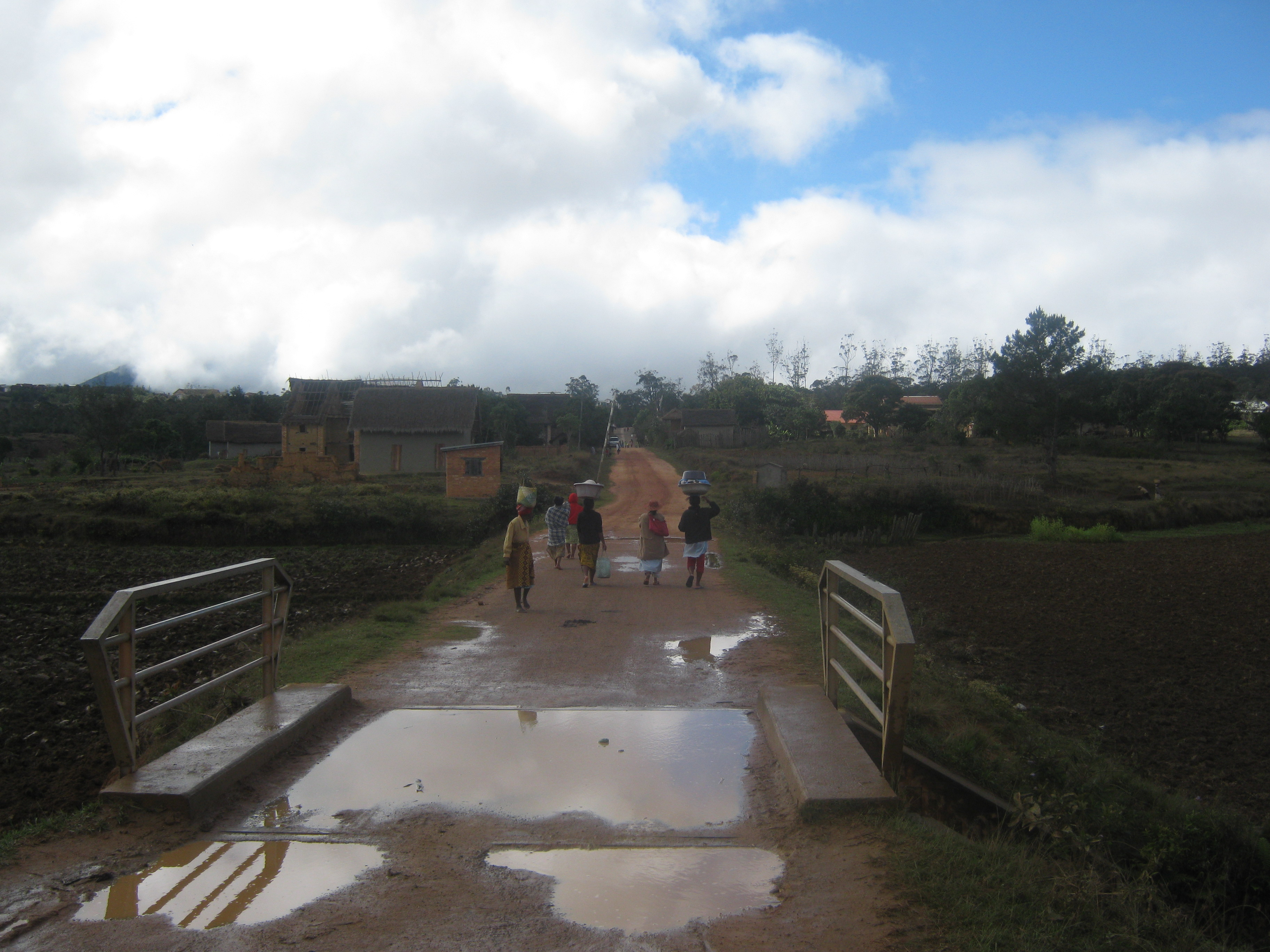
- Bridge entering Ambohimahamasina

- Location in Madagascar
- Country: Madagascar
- Region: Haute Matsiatra
- District: Ambalavao District
- Elevation: 1,009 m (3,310 ft)

Population (2018)Census
  - Total: 23,949
- Postal code: 303

Ambohimahamasina is a rural municipality in the Ambalavao District in Haute Matsiatra Region in central Madagascar. It is situated near the Andringitra National Park. Ambohimahamasina can be reached by the Provincial road 201 from Ambalavao (39 km).

== Rivers ==
It is situated at the Mananatana river.
