= Ivoamba =

- Location in Madagascar
- Coordinates: 21°24′S 47°10′E
- Country: Madagascar
- Region: Haute Matsiatra
- District: Lalangina
- Elevation: 1,089 m (3,573 ft)

Population (2001)
  - Total: 12,000
- Time zone: UTC3 (EAT)
- Postal code: 303

Ivoamba is rural municipality in Madagascar. It belongs to the district of Lalangina, which is a part of Haute Matsiatra Region. The population of the commune was estimated to be approximately 12,000 in 2001 commune census.

In addition to primary schooling the town offers secondary education at both junior and senior levels. The majority 88% of the population of the commune are farmers. The most important crop is rice, while other important products include beans, maize and cassava. Industry and services provide employment for 8% and 2% of the population, respectively. Additionally, fishing employs 2% of the population.
