= Solila =

- Location in Madagascar
- Coordinates: 21°25′S 46°47′E
- Country: Madagascar
- Region: Haute Matsiatra
- District: Ikalamavony

Area
  - Land: 1,152 km^{2} (445 sq mi)

Population (2018)
  - Total: 14,553
  - Ethnicities: Betsileo >90 % Antandroy 5−10 % Tanala
- Time zone: UTC3 (EAT)
- Postal code: 314

Solila is a rural municipality in Haute Matsiatra Region in central Madagascar. It is some 30 kilometres west of Fianarantsoa.

Next to the village of Solila also the following fokontany (villages) belong to this municipality: Soanierana, Tearomizaha, Ambalamahatsara, Ipaka, Kirano, Fihasinana, Ambatovory and Ankazomanga It lies at the Mananantanana river.

== Roads ==
Solila is situated on the National road 42 though it's almost impossible to join the town during the rainy season because of the rivers that need to be crossed.
