= Andrainjato =

- Location in Madagascar
- Coordinates: 21°56′S 46°59′E
- Country: Madagascar
- Region: Haute Matsiatra
- District: Ambalavao
- Elevation: 986 m (3,235 ft)

Population (2001)
  - Total: 6,000
- Time zone: UTC3 (EAT)

Andrainjato is a town and commune in Madagascar. It belongs to the district of Ambalavao, which is a part of Haute Matsiatra Region. The population of the commune was estimated to be approximately 6,000 in the 2001 commune census.

Only primary schooling is available. Farmers make up 98% of the commune's population, while an additional 1% receives their livelihood from raising livestock. The most important crop is rice, while other important products are onions and tobacco. Services provide employment for 1% of the population.
