= Ambinanindroa =

Coordinates: 20.6500°S 47.8000°E

- Interactive map of Ambinanindroa
- Country: Madagascar
- Region: Haute Matsiatra
- District: Ambalavao

Population (2001)
  - Total: 15,000
- Time zone: UTC3 (EAT)

Ambinanindroa is a town and commune in Madagascar. It belongs to the district of Ambalavao, which is a part of Haute Matsiatra Region. The population of the commune was estimated to be approximately 15,000 in 2001 commune census.

Primary and junior level secondary education are available in town. The majority 80% of the population of the commune are farmers, while an additional 15% receives their livelihood from raising livestock. The most important crop is cassava, while other important products are maize and rice. Services provide employment for 5% of the population.
