= Fenoarivo, Ambalavao =

Fenoarivo
- Location in Madagascar
- Coordinates: 21°42′S 46°22′E
- Country: Madagascar
- Region: Haute Matsiatra
- District: Ambalavao
- Elevation: 757 m (2,484 ft)

Population (2001)
  - Total: 8,000
- Time zone: UTC3 (EAT)

Fenoarivo is a town and commune in Madagascar. It belongs to the district of Ambalavao, which is a part of Haute Matsiatra Region. The population of the commune was estimated to be approximately 8,000 in 2001 commune census.

Only primary schooling is available. The majority 98% of the population of the commune are farmers. The most important crop is rice, while other important products are maize and cassava. Services provide employment for 2% of the population.

== See also ==
- Fenoarivo mine
