= Talata Ampano =

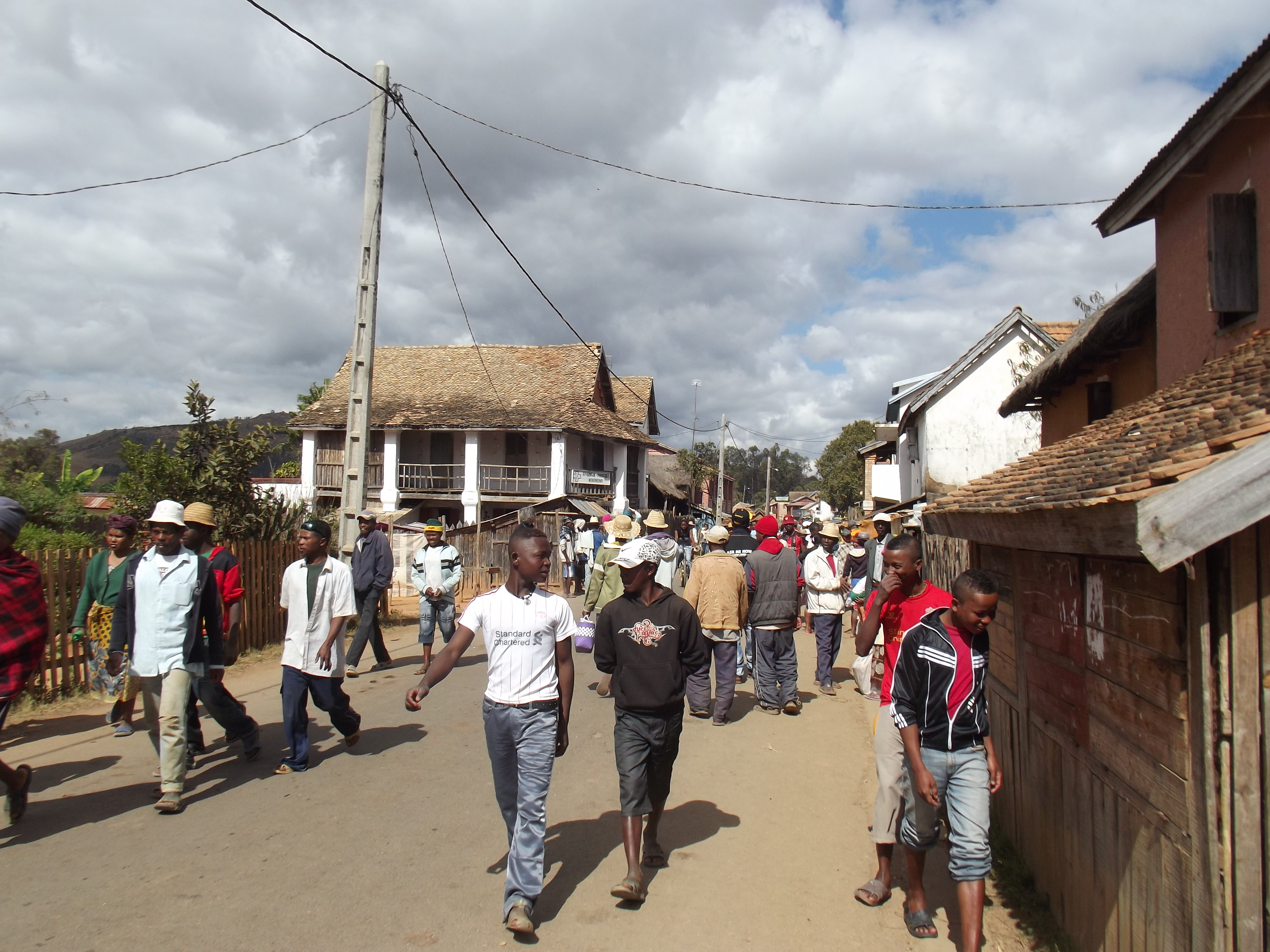
- Talata Ampano

- Location in Madagascar
- Coordinates: 21°33′S 47°2′E
- Country: Madagascar
- Region: Haute Matsiatra
- District: Vohibato District

Government
  - Mayor: Fidèle Ramanantsalama
- Elevation: 1,124 m (3,688 ft)

Population (2001)
  - Total: 15,000
- Time zone: UTC3 (EAT)
- Postal code: 305

Talata Ampano is a rural municipality in Madagascar. It belongs to the district of Vohibato District, which is a part of Haute Matsiatra Region. The population of the commune was estimated to be approximately 15,000 in 2001 commune census.

Primary and junior level secondary education are available in town. The majority 86% of the population of the commune are farmers, while an additional 5% receives their livelihood from raising livestock. The most important crop is rice, while other important products are vegetables, cassava, sweet potatoes and tomato. Industry and services provide employment for 6% and 2% of the population, respectively. Additionally fishing employs 1% of the population.

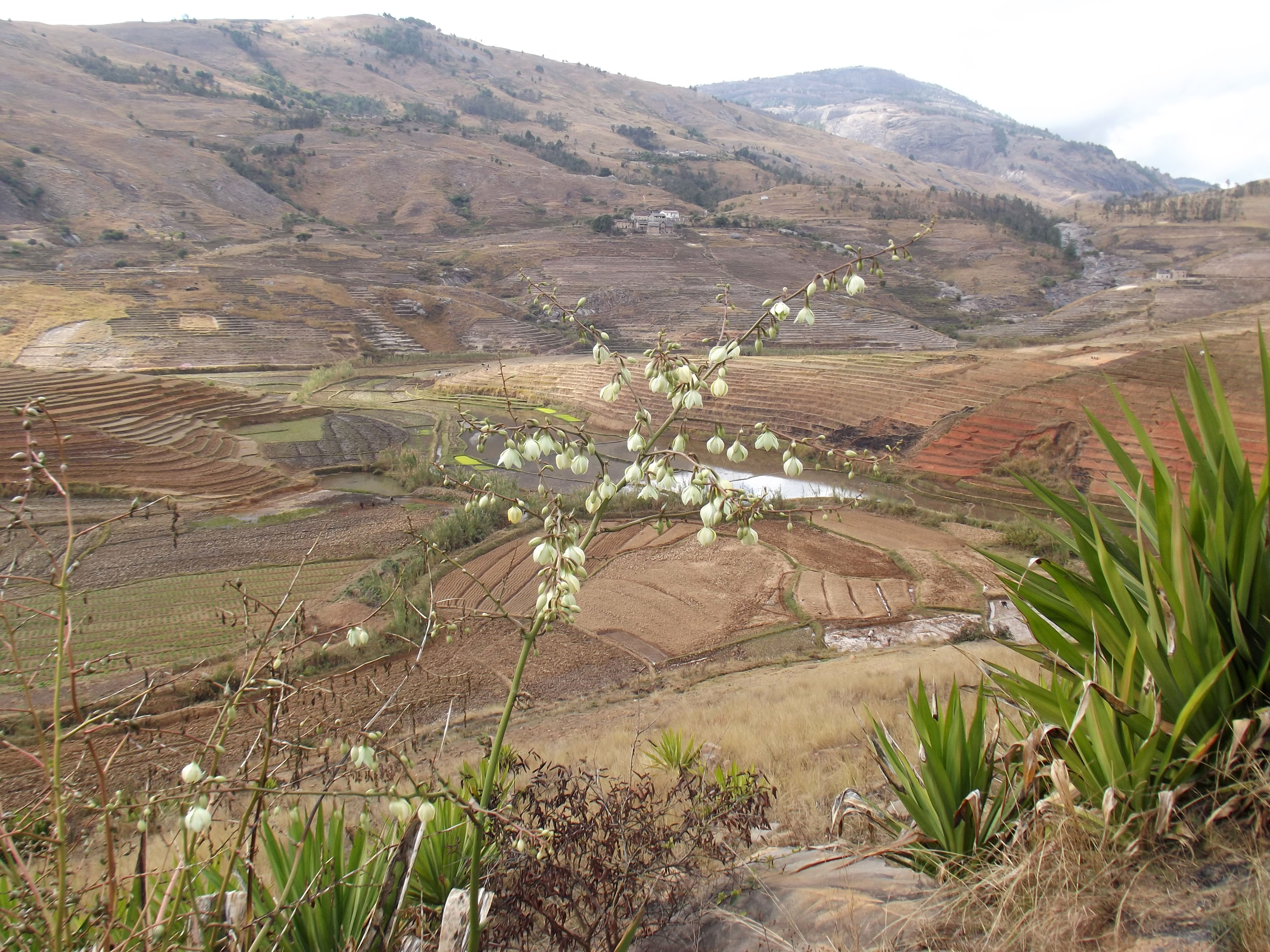
Landscape between Talata Ampano and Ambalavao

== Roads ==
The commune is crossed by the RN 7. It is situated at 18 km from Fianarantsoa.
