= Mahazony =

- Location in Madagascar
- Coordinates: 21°59′S 47°1′E
- Country: Madagascar
- Region: Haute Matsiatra
- District: Ambalavao
- Elevation: 1,055 m (3,461 ft)

Population (2001)
  - Total: 11,000
- Time zone: UTC3 (EAT)

Mahazony is a town and commune in Madagascar. It belongs to the district of Ambalavao, which is a part of Haute Matsiatra Region. The population of the commune was estimated to be approximately 11,000 in 2001 commune census.

Primary and junior level secondary education are available in town. The majority 99% of the population of the commune are farmers. The most important crop is rice, while other important products are cassava and tobacco. Services provide employment for 1% of the population.
