= Besoa =

- Location in Madagascar
- Coordinates: 21°54′S 46°46′E
- Country: Madagascar
- Region: Haute Matsiatra
- District: Ambalavao
- Elevation: 1,089 m (3,573 ft)

Population (2001)
  - Total: 7,000
- Time zone: UTC3 (EAT)

Besoa is a rural commune in the Central Highlands of Madagascar. It belongs to the district of Ambalavao, which is a part of Haute Matsiatra Region. The population of the commune was estimated to be approximately 7,000 in 2001 commune census.

Only primary schooling is available. The majority 98% of the population of the commune are farmers. The most important crops are rice and peanuts, while other important agricultural products are beans, maize and cassava. Services provide employment for 2% of the population.
