= Ambatomainty, Ikalamavony =

Ambatomainty
- Location in Madagascar
- Coordinates: 20°54′S 46°27′E
- Country: Madagascar
- Region: Haute Matsiatra
- District: Ikalamavony
- Elevation: 749 m (2,457 ft)

Population (2018)
  - Total: 12,421
- Time zone: UTC3 (EAT)
- Climate: Cwa

Ambatomainty is a rural municipality in Madagascar. It belongs to the district of Ikalamavony District, which is a part of Haute Matsiatra Region. The population of the commune was estimated to be approximately 12,421 in 2018.

Only primary schooling is available. The majority 95% of the population of the commune are farmers, while an additional 5% receives their livelihood from raising livestock. The most important crop is rice, while other important products are peanuts, beans and cassava.

== Roads ==
The partly unpaved National road 42 links the town to Isorana and Fianarantsoa.
