= Vohitsaoka =

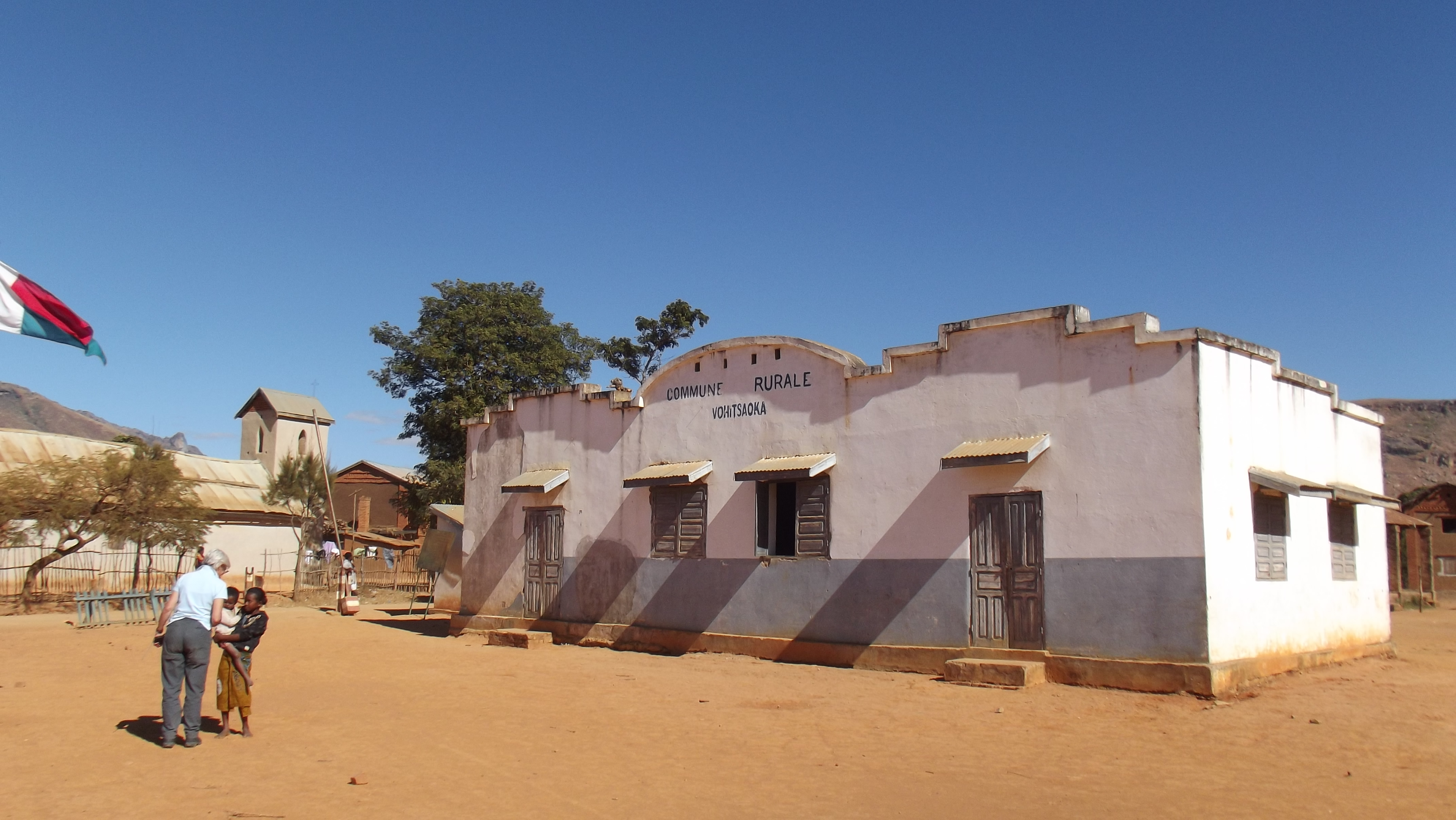
- Vohitsaoka, town hall

- Location in Madagascar
- Coordinates: 22°2′S 46°43′E
- Country: Madagascar
- Region: Haute Matsiatra
- District: Ambalavao
- Elevation: 860 m (2,820 ft)

Population (2001)
  - Total: 10,000
- Time zone: UTC3 (EAT)

Vohitsaoka is a rural commune in the Central Highlands of Madagascar. It belongs to the district of Ambalavao, which is a part of Haute Matsiatra Region. The population of the commune was estimated to be approximately 10,000 in 2001 commune census.

Only primary schooling is available. The majority 85% of the population of the commune are farmers, while an additional 10% receives their livelihood from raising livestock. The most important crop is rice, while other important products are maize, cassava and bambara groundnut. Services provide employment for 5% of the population.

== Protected Area ==
The eastern part of the commune is included in the Andringitra National Park.
