= Manamisoa =

- Location in Madagascar
- Coordinates: 21°46′S 46°58′E
- Country: Madagascar
- Region: Haute Matsiatra
- District: Ambalavao
- Elevation: 1,076 m (3,530 ft)

Population (2001)
  - Total: 4,000
- Time zone: UTC3 (EAT)

Manamisoa is a rural commune in the Central Highlands of Madagascar. It belongs to the district of Ambalavao, which is a part of Haute Matsiatra Region. The population of the commune was estimated to be approximately 4,000 in 2001 commune census.

Only primary schooling is available. The majority 96% of the population of the commune are farmers, while an additional 1% receives their livelihood from raising livestock. The most important crops are rice and grapes; also cassava is an important agricultural product. Industry and services provide employment for 1% and 2% of the population, respectively.
