= Jean Ernest Rakotonomenjanahary =

Malagasy politician

Jean Ernest Rakotonomenjanahary is a Malagasy politician. A member of the National Assembly of Madagascar, he was elected as a member of the Tiako I Madagasikara party; he represents the constituency of Lalangina in the 2007 Malagasy parliamentary elections.
