= Androy, Fianarantsoa =

- Location in Madagascar
- Coordinates: 21°20′S 47°16′E
- Country: Madagascar
- Region: Haute Matsiatra
- District: Lalangina
- Elevation: 1,119 m (3,671 ft)

Population (2018)
  - Total: 15,938
- Time zone: UTC3 (EAT)
- Postal code: 302

Androy, Fianarantsoa is a town and commune in Madagascar. It belongs to the district of Lalangina, which is a part of Haute Matsiatra Region. The population of the commune was 15938 in 2018.

Primary and junior level secondary education are available in town. The majority 76.5% of the population of the commune are farmers, while an additional 12% receives their livelihood from raising livestock. The most important crop is rice, while other important products are cassava, sweet potatoes and potatoes. Industry and services provide employment for 10% and 1% of the population, respectively. Additionally fishing employs 0.5% of the population.
