= Ihazoara =

- Location in Madagascar
- Coordinates: 21°35′S 47°16′E
- Country: Madagascar
- Region: Haute Matsiatra
- District: Vohibato District
- Elevation: 1,113 m (3,652 ft)

Population (2018)
  - Total: 7,376
- Time zone: UTC3 (EAT)
- Postal code: 305

Ihazoara is a town and commune in Madagascar. It belongs to the district of Vohibato, which is a part of Haute Matsiatra Region. The population of the commune was estimated to be 7376 in 2018.

Primary and junior level secondary education are available in town. The majority 99.3% of the population of the commune are farmers. The most important crop is rice. Other important products include beans, cassava and sweet potatoes. Services provide employment for 0.7% of the population.
