= Anjoma =

- Location in Madagascar
- Coordinates: 21°13′S 46°55′E
- Country: Madagascar
- Region: Haute Matsiatra
- District: Ambalavao
- Elevation: 1,102 m (3,615 ft)

Population (2001)
  - Total: 13,000
- Time zone: UTC3 (EAT)
- Postal code: 303

Anjoma is a rural municipality in Madagascar. It belongs to the district of Ambalavao, which is a part of Haute Matsiatra Region. The population of the commune was estimated to be approximately 13,000 in 2001 commune census.

Primary and junior level secondary education are available in town. The majority 98% of the population of the commune are farmers, while an additional 1% receives their livelihood from raising livestock. The most important crop is rice, while other important products are beans, maize and cassava. Services provide employment for 1% of the population.

== Nature ==
The Tapia forest of Anjoma supplies the town with fruits, champignons and wild silk.
