= Sendrisoa =

- Location in Madagascar
- Coordinates: 22°0′S 46°57′E
- Country: Madagascar
- Region: Haute Matsiatra
- District: Ambalavao
- Elevation: 1,217 m (3,993 ft)

Population (2001)
  - Total: 12,000
- Time zone: UTC3 (EAT)
- Postal code: 303

Sendrisoa is a rural municipality in the Central Highlands of Madagascar. It belongs to the district of Ambalavao, which is a part of Haute Matsiatra Region. The population of the commune was estimated to be approximately 12,000 in 2001 commune census.

Primary and junior level secondary education are available in town. The majority 98% of the population of the commune are farmers. The most important crop is rice, while other important products are peanuts, cassava and sweet potatoes. Services provide employment for 2% of the population.

== Protected Area ==
Sendrisoa is the northern entry point to the Andringitra National Park.

== Roads ==
Sendrisoa is situated at 28 km South of Ambalavao by the Provincial road 203 to Namoly (42 km) and the Andringitra National Park entrance.
