= Mahaditra =

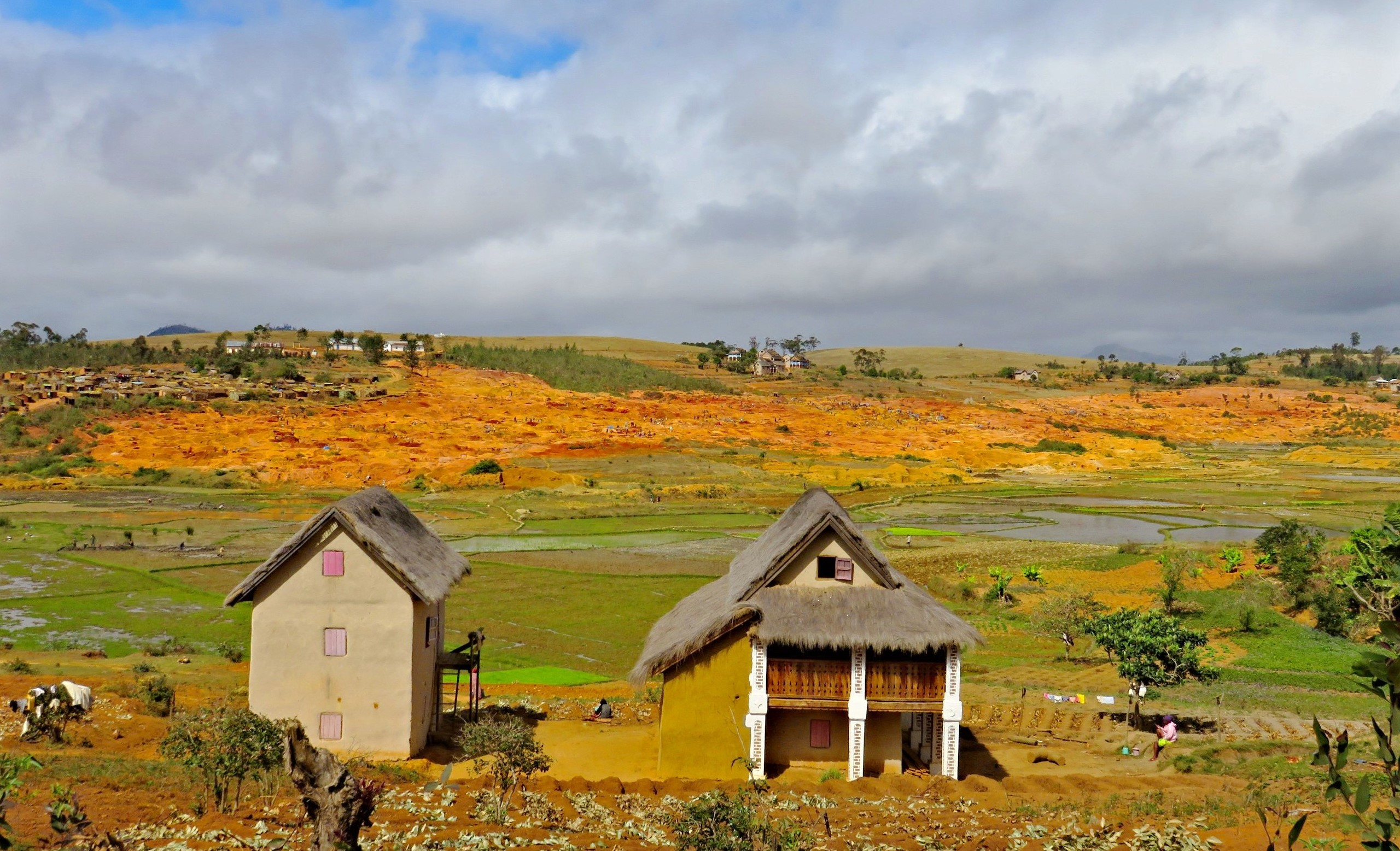
- Mahaditra

- Location in Madagascar
- Coordinates: 21°45′S 47°6′E
- Country: Madagascar
- Region: Haute Matsiatra
- District: Fianarantsoa II
- Elevation: 1,224 m (4,016 ft)

Population (2018)Census
  - Total: 20,068
- Time zone: UTC3 (EAT)

Mahaditra is a town and commune in Madagascar. It belongs to the district of Fianarantsoa II, which is a part of Haute Matsiatra Region. The population of the municipality was 20068 in 2018.

Primary and junior level secondary education are available in town. The majority 99.47% of the population of the commune are farmers, while an additional 0.03% receives their livelihood from raising livestock. The most important crop is rice, while other important products are beans, cassava and sweet potatoes. Services provide employment for 0.5% of the population.
