= Soaindrana =

- Location in Madagascar
- Coordinates: 21°31′S 47°2′E
- Country: Madagascar
- Region: Haute Matsiatra
- District: Fianarantsoaii
- Elevation: 1,194 m (3,917 ft)

Population (2001)
  - Total: 8,000
- Time zone: UTC3 (EAT)

Soaindrana is a town and commune in Madagascar. It belongs to the district of Fianarantsoaii, which is a part of Haute Matsiatra Region. The population of the commune was estimated to be approximately 8,000 in 2001 commune census.

Only primary schooling is available. The majority 90% of the population of the commune are farmers, while an additional 8% receives their livelihood from raising livestock. The most important crops are rice and cabbage, while other important agricultural products are beans and cassava. Industry and services provide both employment for 1% of the population.
