= Andranomiditra =

- Location in Madagascar
- Coordinates: 21°40′S 47°19′E
- Country: Madagascar
- Region: Haute Matsiatra
- District: Fianarantsoa II
- Elevation: 1,205 m (3,953 ft)

Population (2001)
  - Total: 13,000
- Time zone: UTC3 (EAT)

Andranomiditra is a town and commune in Madagascar. It belongs to the district of Fianarantsoa II, which is a part of Haute Matsiatra Region. The population of the commune was estimated to be approximately 13,000 in 2001 commune census.

Primary and junior level secondary education are available in town. It is also a site of industrial-scale mining. The majority 98% of the population of the commune are farmers. The most important crop is rice, while other important products are beans, cassava and sweet potatoes. Industry and services provide employment for 0.1% and 1.9% of the population, respectively.
