= Alatsinainy Ialamarina =

- Location in Madagascar
- Coordinates: 21°32′S 47°18′E
- Country: Madagascar
- Region: Haute Matsiatra
- District: Fianarantsoa II
- Elevation: 1,116 m (3,661 ft)

Population (2001)
  - Total: 18,000
- Time zone: UTC3 (EAT)

Alatsinainy Ialamarina is a town and commune in Madagascar. It belongs to the district of Fianarantsoa II, which is a part of Haute Matsiatra Region. The population of the commune was estimated to be approximately 18,000 in 2001 commune census.

Primary and junior level secondary education are available in town. The majority 94.7% of the population of the commune are farmers, while an additional 4% receives their livelihood from raising livestock. The most important crop is rice, while other important products are cassava and sweet potatoes. Industry and services provide employment for 0.8% and 0.5% of the population, respectively.
