= Taindambo =

- Location in Madagascar
- Coordinates: 21°28′S 47°9′E
- Country: Madagascar
- Region: Haute Matsiatra
- District: Fianarantsoa II
- Elevation: 1,250 m (4,100 ft)

Population (2001)
  - Total: 10,000
- Time zone: UTC3 (EAT)

Taindambo is a town and commune in Madagascar. It belongs to the district of Fianarantsoa II, which is a part of Haute Matsiatra Region. The population of the commune was estimated to be approximately 10,000 in 2001 commune census.

Primary and junior level secondary education are available in town. The majority 97.5% of the population of the commune are farmers. The most important crop is rice, while other important products are beans, cassava and sweet potatoes. Industry and services provide employment for 0.1% and 1.4% of the population, respectively. Additionally fishing employs 1% of the population.
