= Tanamarina Sakay =

- Location in Madagascar
- Coordinates: 22°28′S 46°37′E
- Country: Madagascar
- Region: Haute Matsiatra
- District: Ikalamavony

Area
  - Total: 1,205 km^{2} (465 sq mi)
- Elevation: 799 m (2,621 ft)

Population (2018)
  - Total: 9,235
- Time zone: UTC3 (EAT)
- Postal code: 314

Tanamarina Sakay is a rural municipality in Madagascar. It belongs to the district of Ikalamavony, which is a part of Haute Matsiatra Region. The population of the commune was estimated to be approximately 9,235 in 2018.

Villages: this municipality is constituted by the villages Sakay, Fompohony, Ambalamahasoa, Antsamby and Manomboarivo.
