= Andrainjato Centre =

- Location in Madagascar
- Coordinates: 21°29′S 47°7′E
- Country: Madagascar
- Region: Haute Matsiatra
- District: Fianarantsoaii
- Elevation: 1,136 m (3,727 ft)

Population (2001)
  - Total: 10,000
- Time zone: UTC3 (EAT)

Andrainjato Centre is a town and commune in Madagascar. It belongs to the district of Fianarantsoaii, which is a part of Haute Matsiatra Region. The population of the commune was estimated to be approximately 10,000 in 2001 commune census.

Primary and junior level secondary education are available in town. The majority 89% of the population of the commune are farmers, while an additional 6% receives their livelihood from raising livestock. The most important crops are cassava and rice, while other important agricultural products are maize and sweet potatoes. Industry and services provide employment for 1% and 3% of the population, respectively. Additionally fishing employs 1% of the population.
