= Mahatsinjony =

- Location in Madagascar
- Coordinates: 21°25′S 47°12′E
- Country: Madagascar
- Region: Haute Matsiatra
- District: Fianarantsoa II
- Elevation: 1,102 m (3,615 ft)

Population (2001)
  - Total: 14,000
- Time zone: UTC3 (EAT)

Mahatsinjony is a town and commune in Madagascar located in the district of Fianarantsoa II, a part of Haute Matsiatra Region. The population of the commune was estimated to be approximately 14,000 in the 2001 commune census.

Primary and junior level secondary education are available in town. The majority (98%) of the population of the commune are farmers, while an additional 1% receives their livelihood from raising livestock. The most important crops are sweet potatoes and rice, while other important agricultural products are beans and cassava. Additionally, 1% of the population are employed in the fishing industry.
