= Ambalakely =

- Location in Madagascar
- Coordinates: 21°25′S 47°10′E
- Country: Madagascar
- Region: Haute Matsiatra
- District: Fianarantsoa II
- Elevation: 1,091 m (3,579 ft)

Population (2001)
  - Total: 6,000
- Time zone: UTC3 (EAT)
- Climate: Cwb

Ambalakely is a town and commune in Madagascar. It belongs to the district of Fianarantsoa II, which is a part of Haute Matsiatra Region. The population of the commune was estimated to be approximately 6,000 in 2001 commune census.

Primary and junior level secondary education are available in the town. The majority of the population, which consists of 88% of the commune, are farmers, while an additional 0.5% of the people receive their livelihood from raising livestock. The most important crop is rice, while other major products are beans, cassava and potatoes. Industry and services provide employment for 6% and 5% of the population, respectively. Additionally fishing 0.5% of the population are engaged in fishing
