= Ambalamahasoa =

- Location in Madagascar
- Coordinates: 21°14′S 47°7′E
- Country: Madagascar
- Region: Haute Matsiatra
- District: Fianarantsoa II
- Elevation: 1,404 m (4,606 ft)

Population (2001)
  - Total: 8,000
- Time zone: UTC3 (EAT)

Ambalamahasoa is a town and commune in Madagascar. It belongs to the district of Fianarantsoa II, which is a part of Haute Matsiatra Region. The population of the commune was estimated to be approximately 8,000 in 2001 commune census.

Only primary schooling is available. The majority 91% of the population of the commune are farmers, while an additional 5.5% receives their livelihood from raising livestock. The most important crops are maize and rice; also beans is an important agricultural product. Industry and services provide employment for 1.5% and 0.5% of the population, respectively. Additionally fishing employs 1.5% of the population.
