= Mangoky River =

River in Madagascar

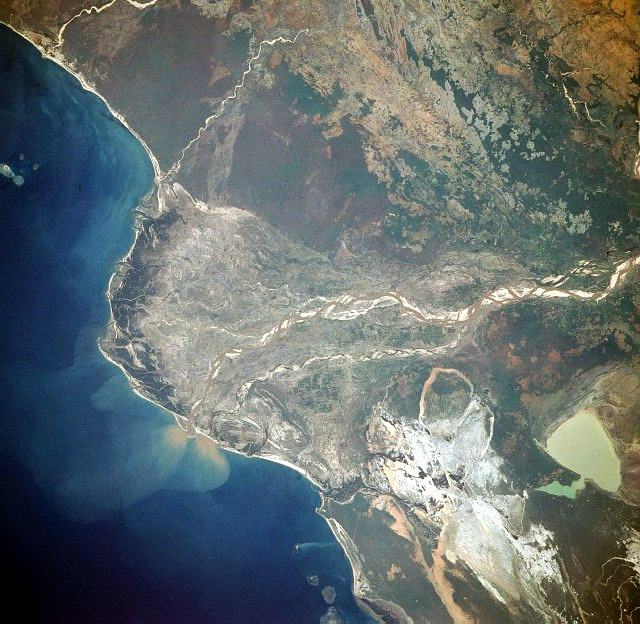
Mangoky River Delta from space, November 1989 (south is to the top) (NASA)

The Mangoky River is a 564-kilometer-long (350 mi) river in Madagascar in the regions of Atsimo-Andrefana and Anosy. It is formed by the Mananantanana and the Matsiatra. Another important affluent is the Zomandao River.

It rises in the Central Highlands of Madagascar just east of the city of Fianarantsoa. The river flows generally in a westerly direction out of the highlands, crosses the southern extension of the Bemaraha Plateau, reaches the coastal plain and its delta, and enters the Mozambique Channel north of the city of Morombe at 21.316667°S 43.533333°E.

Most of Madagascar has undergone serious deforestation during the last 40 years, chiefly from slash-and-burn practises by indigenous peoples. This loss of forest has led to extreme soil erosion in the Mangoky River basin, as evidenced by the many sandbars located within the river channel. Silt-laden, greenish-tan Lake Ihotry is clearly discernible south of the river. Between the lake and the coast is a rather large, whitish area of sand interspersed with silt-laden ponds. The southern portion of the delta is dominated by successive barrier island and spit formation. In contrast, the northern, protected portion of the delta is dominated by tidal passes and mangrove swamps.

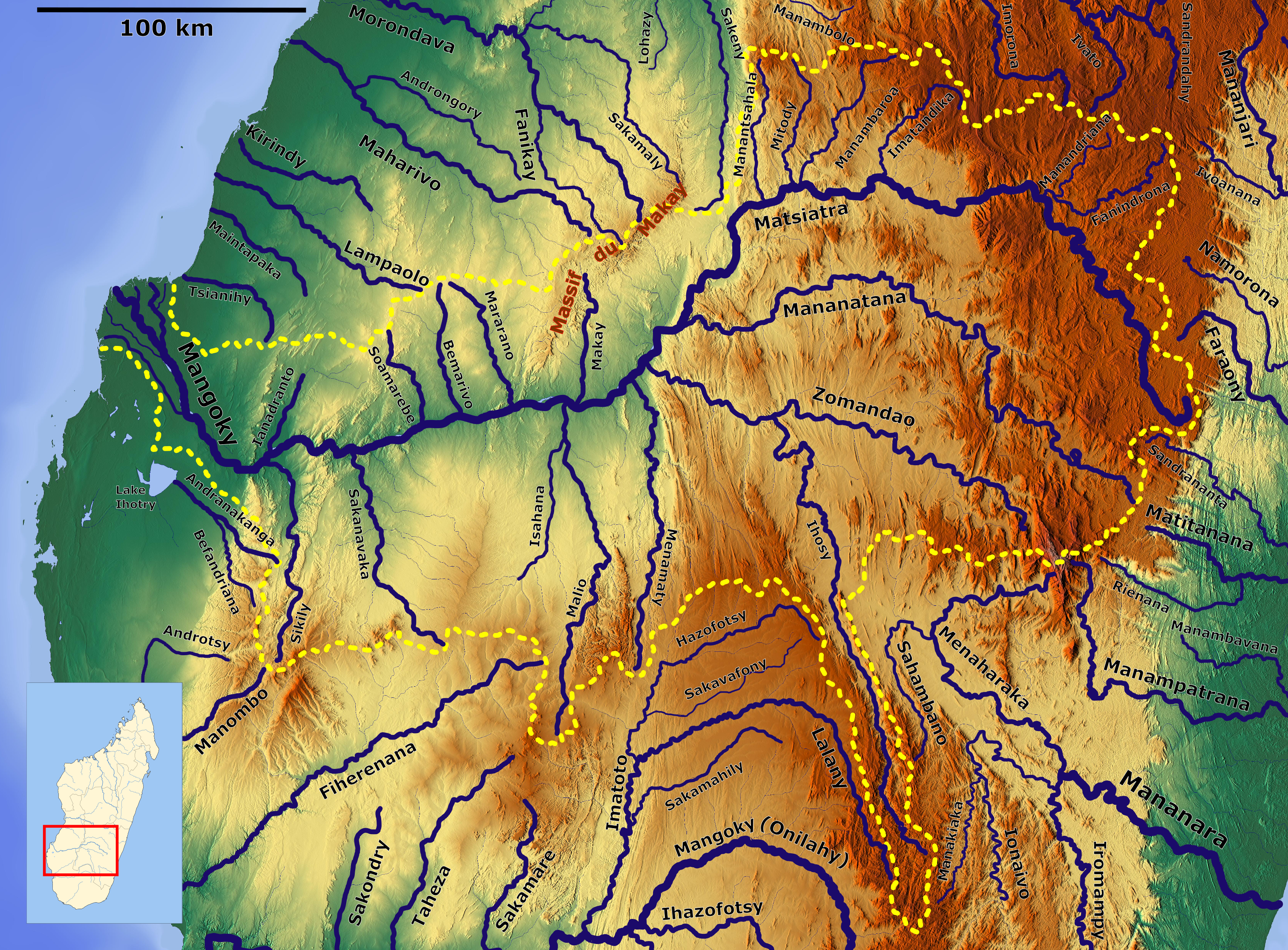
Mangoky Bassin

== Bridge ==
Plans for a Mangoky river bridge on the RN 9 began in 2020. It will be the longest bridge of Madagascar at 880 m. It will be built by the China Road and Bridge Corporation.

== See also ==
- List of rivers of Madagascar
