= Mananantanana =

River in Madagascar

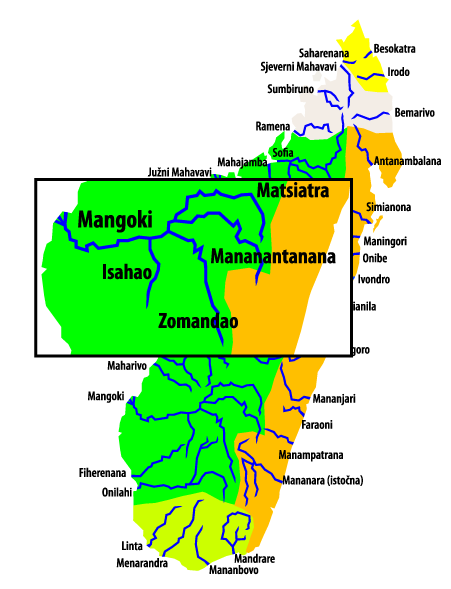
- Mananantanana

- Map of Malagasy rivers.

Location
- Country: Madagascar
- Region: Haute Matsiatra

Physical characteristics
- Source
  - location: Tsitondroina
  - elevation: 1850 m
- Mouth: Mangoky River
  - coordinates: 21°26′00″S 45°34′00″E
- Length: 350 km (220 mi)
- Basin size: 7680 km2

Basin features
- Progression: Solila, Ambalavao
- River system: Mangoky River
- Tributaries
  - right: Manambovona

The Mananantanana is a river in Haute Matsiatra region, is located in eastern Madagascar. It flows into the Mangoky River.

It has its springs in the Andringitra Massif. Together with the Matsiatra it forms the Mangoky River.

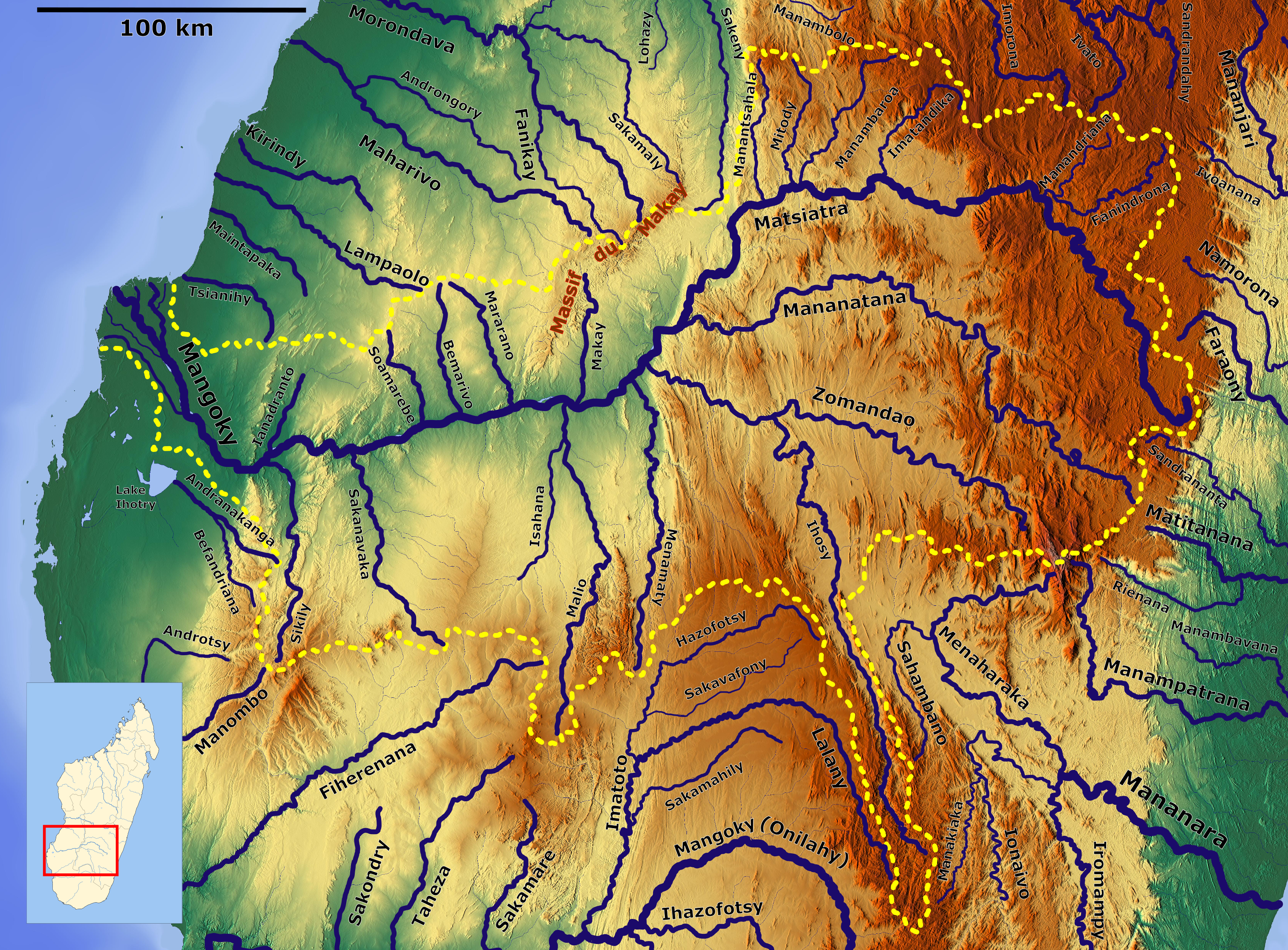
Mangoky Bassin
