= Mahasoabe, Fianarantsoa II =

Mahasoabe
- Location in Madagascar
- Coordinates: 21°35′S 47°13′E
- Country: Madagascar
- Region: Haute Matsiatra
- District: Fianarantsoa II
- Elevation: 1,100 m (3,600 ft)

Population (2001)
  - Total: 34,000
- Time zone: UTC3 (EAT)

Mahasoabe is a town and commune in Madagascar. It belongs to the district of Fianarantsoa II, which is a part of Haute Matsiatra Region. The population of the commune was estimated to be approximately 34,000 in 2001 commune census.

In addition to primary schooling the town offers secondary education at both junior and senior levels. The majority 98% of the population of the commune are farmers. The most important crops are rice and oranges, while other important agricultural products are cassava, sweet potatoes and potatoes. Services provide employment for 1% of the population. Additionally fishing employs 1% of the population.
