= Fitampito =

- Location in Madagascar
- Coordinates: 20°58′S 46°19′E
- Country: Madagascar
- Region: Haute Matsiatra
- District: Ikalamavony

Area *Atlas de la Réunion Haute Matsiatra
  - Total: 2,202 km^{2} (850 sq mi)
- Elevation: 652 m (2,139 ft)

Population (2018)
  - Total: 9,546
- Time zone: UTC3 (EAT)
- Postal code: 314

Fitampito is a rural municipality in Madagascar. It belongs to the district of Ikalamavony, which is a part of Haute Matsiatra Region. The population of the commune was estimated to be approximately 9,546 in 2018.

Only primary schooling is available. Farming and raising livestock provides employment for 44% and 55% of the working population. The most important crop is rice, while other important products are peanuts, beans and cassava. Services provide employment for 1% of the population.

== Rivers ==
The town lies at the Matsiatra river.
