= Tanamarina =

- Location within Madagascar
- Coordinates: 21°35′S 45°56′E
- Country: Madagascar
- Region: Haute Matsiatra
- District: Ikalamavony
- Elevation: 750 m (2,460 ft)

Population (2001)
  - Total: 10,000
- Time zone: UTC3 (EAT)
- Postal code: 314

Tanamarina or Tanamarina Bekisopa is a rural municipality in Madagascar. It belongs to the district of Ikalamavony, which is a part of Haute Matsiatra Region. The population of the commune was estimated to be approximately 10,000 in 2001 commune census.

Only primary schooling is available. The majority 50% of the population of the commune are farmers, while an additional 50% receives their livelihood from raising livestock. The most important crops are rice and cassava, while other important agricultural products are beans and taro.

== Mining ==
There is an iron ore mine in the small village of Bekisopa. This mine is entirely owned by Akora Resources Limited, an Australian mining company. It hosts an estimated 194.7 million tons of iron ore, with over four million tons of iron ore having been extracted. Over $3.8 million has been used to secure additional resources.
