= Ambalavao District =

District in Haute Matsiatra, Madagascar

Coordinates: 21.2333°S 47.2333°E

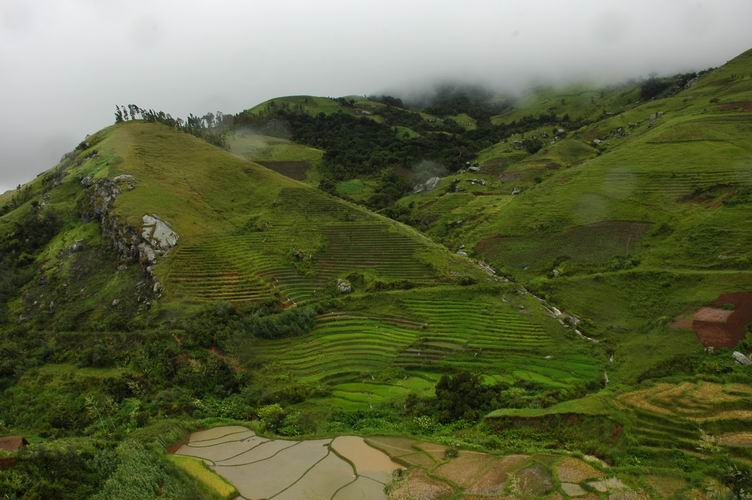
Rice terrace outside Ambalavao

Ambalavao District is a district in central Madagascar. It covers an area of 4,798.47 km^{2}, and had a population estimated at 209,417 in 2013. It is part of Haute Matsiatra Region. Its capital is Ambalavao.

== Communes ==
The district is further divided into 19 communes:

- Ambalavao
- Ambinanindovoka
- Ambinanindroa
- Ambohimahamasina
- Ambohimandroso
- Andrainjato
- Anjoma
- Ankaramena
- Besoa
- Fenoarivo
- Iarintsena
- Kirano
- Mahazony
- Manamisoa
- Miarinarivo
- Namoly
- Sendrisoa
- Vohitsaoka
- One name unknown

== Geography ==
Ambalavao is situated at the National road 7 Fianarantsoa-Ihosy-Tuléar at 160 km from Ihosy and 56 km from Fianarantsoa. An airport serves the town.

== Nature ==
- The Anja Community Reserve, situated about 13 km south of Ambalavao, is a small community-based reserve created to preserve and manage local natural resources.
- Part of Andringitra National Park.
- Part of the Ambositra-Vondrozo Forest Corridor, a protected harmonious landscape.
