= Andranovorivato =

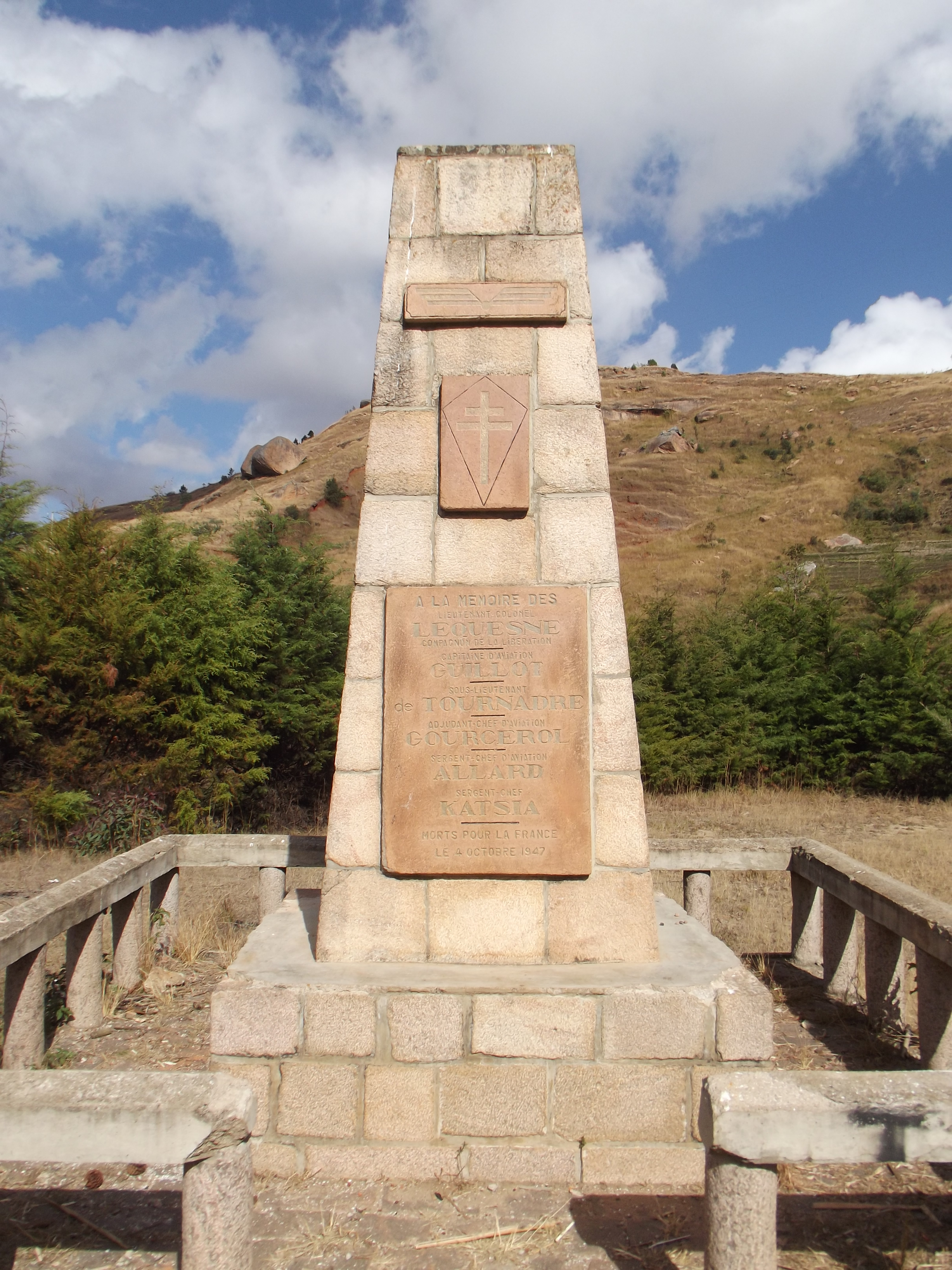
- a monument near Andranovorivato

- Location in Madagascar
- Coordinates: 21°38′S 46°59′E
- Country: Madagascar
- Region: Haute Matsiatra
- District: Fianarantsoa II
- Elevation: 1,236 m (4,055 ft)

Population (2001)
  - Total: 22,000
- Time zone: UTC3 (EAT)

Andranovorivato is a rural municipality Madagascar. It belongs to the district of Fianarantsoa II, which is a part of Haute Matsiatra Region. The population of the commune was estimated to be approximately 22,000 in 2001 commune census.

Primary and junior level secondary education are available in town. The majority 93% of the population of the commune are farmers. The most important crops are rice and beans, while other important agricultural products are cassava and sweet potatoes. Services provide employment for 7% of the population.
