= Tsitondroina =

- Location in Madagascar
- Coordinates: 21°18′S 45°59′E
- Country: Madagascar
- Region: Haute Matsiatra
- District: Ikalamavony
- Elevation: 674 m (2,211 ft)

Population (2001)
  - Total: 30,000
- Time zone: UTC3 (EAT)

Tsitondroina is a town and commune in Madagascar. It belongs to the district of Ikalamavony, which is a part of Haute Matsiatra Region. The population of the commune was estimated to be approximately 30,000 in 2001 commune census.

Only primary schooling is available. The majority 52% of the population of the commune are farmers, while an additional 48% receives their livelihood from raising livestock. The most important crop is rice, while other important products are beans, maize, cassava and onions.
