= Lamosina =

Coordinates: 21°38′24″S 46°53′56″E

- Interactive map of Lamosina
- Country: Madagascar
- Region: Haute Matsiatra
- District: Vohibato District

Population (2018)
  - Total: 11,534
- Time zone: UTC3 (EAT)
- Postal code: 305

Lamosina is a village and commune in Madagascar. It belongs to the district of Vohibato, which is a part of Haute Matsiatra Region. The population of the commune was estimated to be 11534 in 2018.

Lamosina is situated 26 km from Fianarantsoa, the nearest town and capital of the Betsileo, in the centre of Madagascar Island, in The Hauts Plateaux ("High Lands") and 450 km from Antananarivo, the capital.

== Naming ==
Lamosina (literally "back") had its name because it is the extreme village seen from the roof [tafo] of the rock, roof that is like a bump or a back lamosina.

Primary and junior level secondary education are available at Lamosima. The majority 98% of the population of the commune are farmers. The most important crops are rice and beans, while other important agricultural products are peanuts and cassava. Services provide employment for 2% of the population.
