= Route nationale 42 (Madagascar) =

Road in Madagascar

Location
- Country: Madagascar

Highway system
- Roads in Madagascar

Route nationale 42 (RN 42) is a secondary highway in Madagascar, running from Fianarantsoa to Ambatomainty. It crosses the region of Haute Matsiatra.

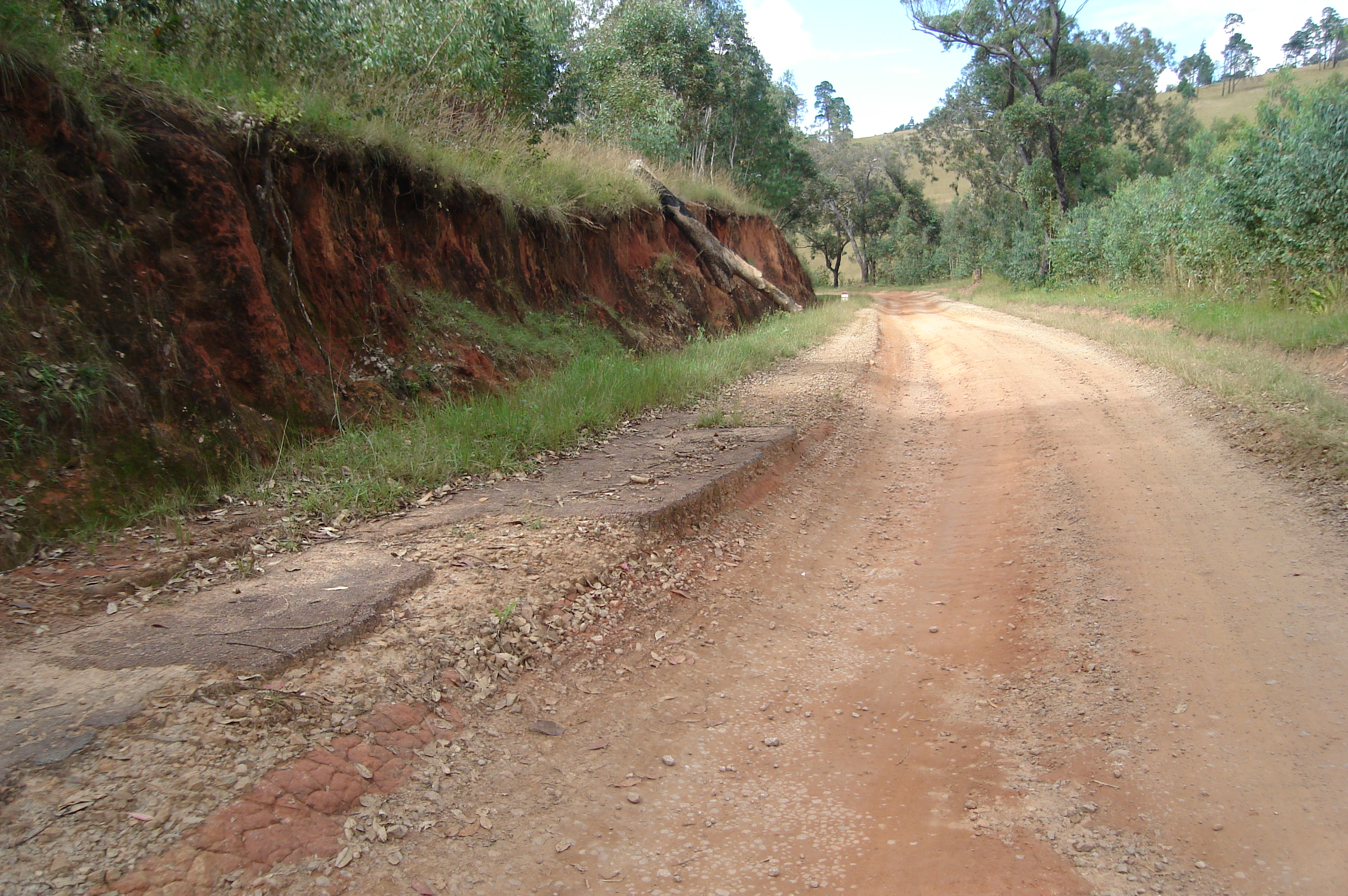
Madagascar National Road 42

== Selected locations on route ==
(east to northwest)

- Fianarantsoa - (intersection with RN 7)
- Isorana
- Ikalamavony - 94 km
- crossing Matsiatra river
- Ambatomainty - 134 km

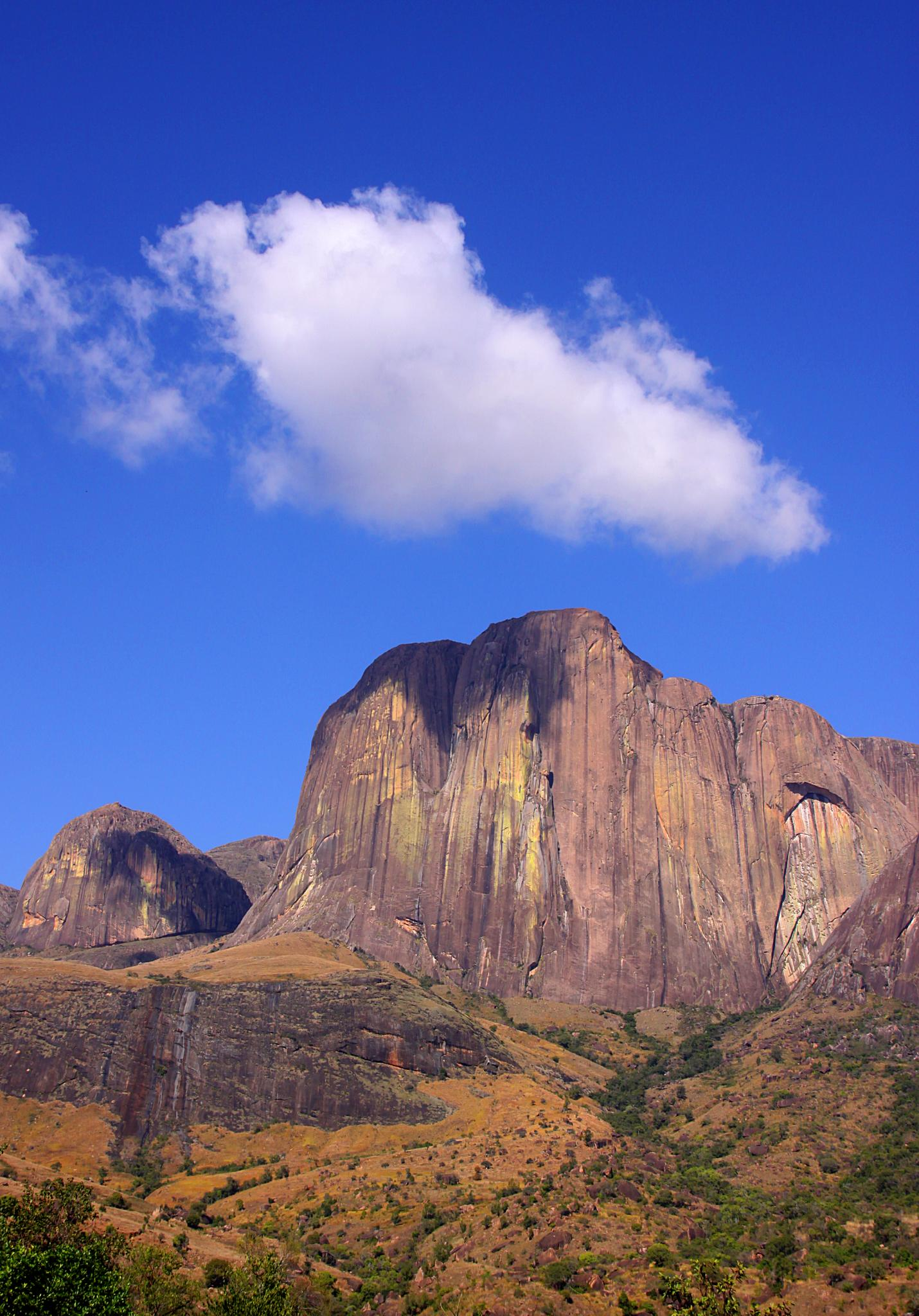
Cliff in Isandra

== See also ==
- List of roads in Madagascar
- Transport in Madagascar
