= Isorana =

- Location in Madagascar
- Coordinates: 21°19′S 46°56′E
- Country: Madagascar
- Region: Haute Matsiatra
- District: Isandra

Area
  - Total: 85.36 km^{2} (32.96 sq mi)
- Elevation: 1,123 m (3,684 ft)

Population (2018)
  - Total: 15,472
- Time zone: UTC3 (EAT)
- Postal code: 314

Isorana is a rural municipality in Madagascar. It belongs to the Isandra district, which is a part of Haute Matsiatra Region. The population of the commune was 15,472 in 2018.

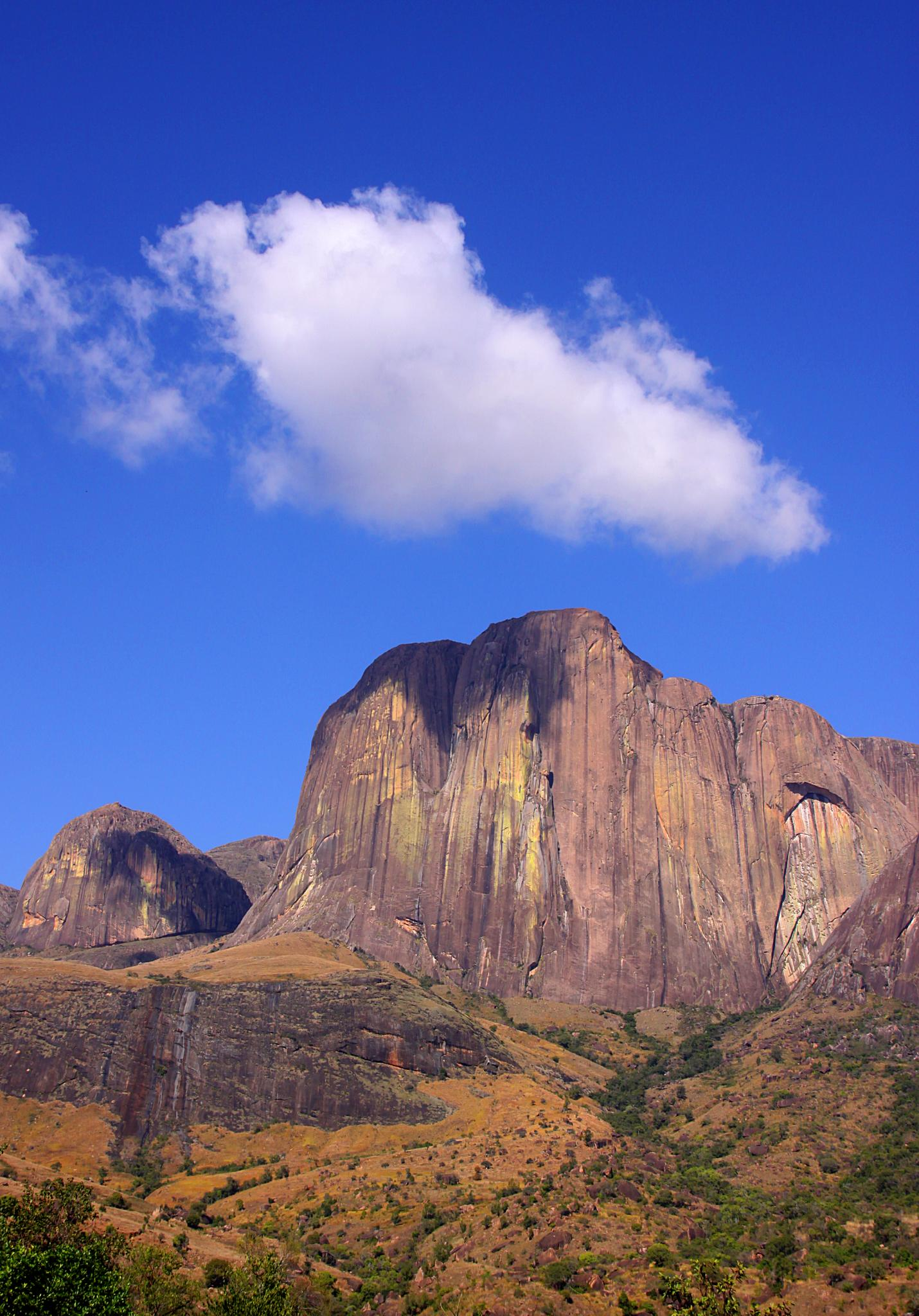
Cliff Isandra

Primary and junior level secondary education are available in town. The majority 80% of the population of the commune are farmers, while an additional 10% receives their livelihood from raising livestock. The most important crop is rice, while other important products are maize and cassava. Services provide employment for 10% of the population.

== Roads ==
The National road 42 links the town to Fianarantsoa.

== Rivers ==
The municipality is crossed by the Isandra river in its center, the Matsiatra in the North-East, and the Ranomaitso in the South.
