= Matsiatra =

River in Madagascar

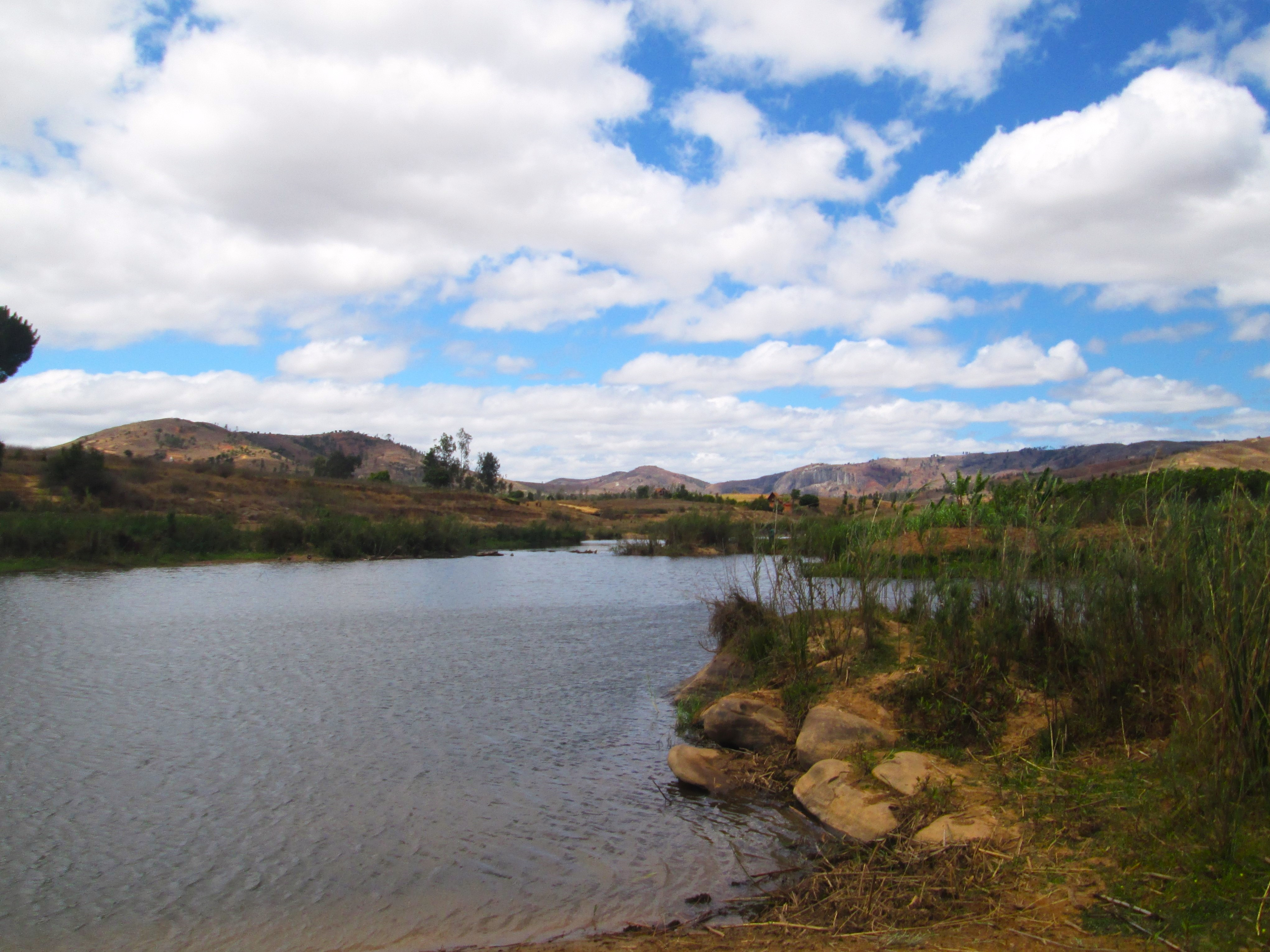
- Matsiatra

- Map of Malagasy rivers.

Location
- Country: Madagascar
- Region: Haute Matsiatra

Physical characteristics
- Source
  - elevation: 1250 m
- Mouth: Mangoky River
  - coordinates: 21°26′00″S 45°34′00″E
- Length: 410 km (250 mi)
- Basin size: 13370 km2

Basin features
- Progression: Iovolo, Fitampito
- River system: Mangoky River
- Tributaries
  - right: Manantsahala' Mitody, Manambaroa, Imatandika, Manandriana, Fanindrona

The Matsiatra is a river in Haute Matsiatra region, is located in central and western Madagascar. It flows into the Mangoky River.

Together with the Mananantanana, it forms the Mangoky River.

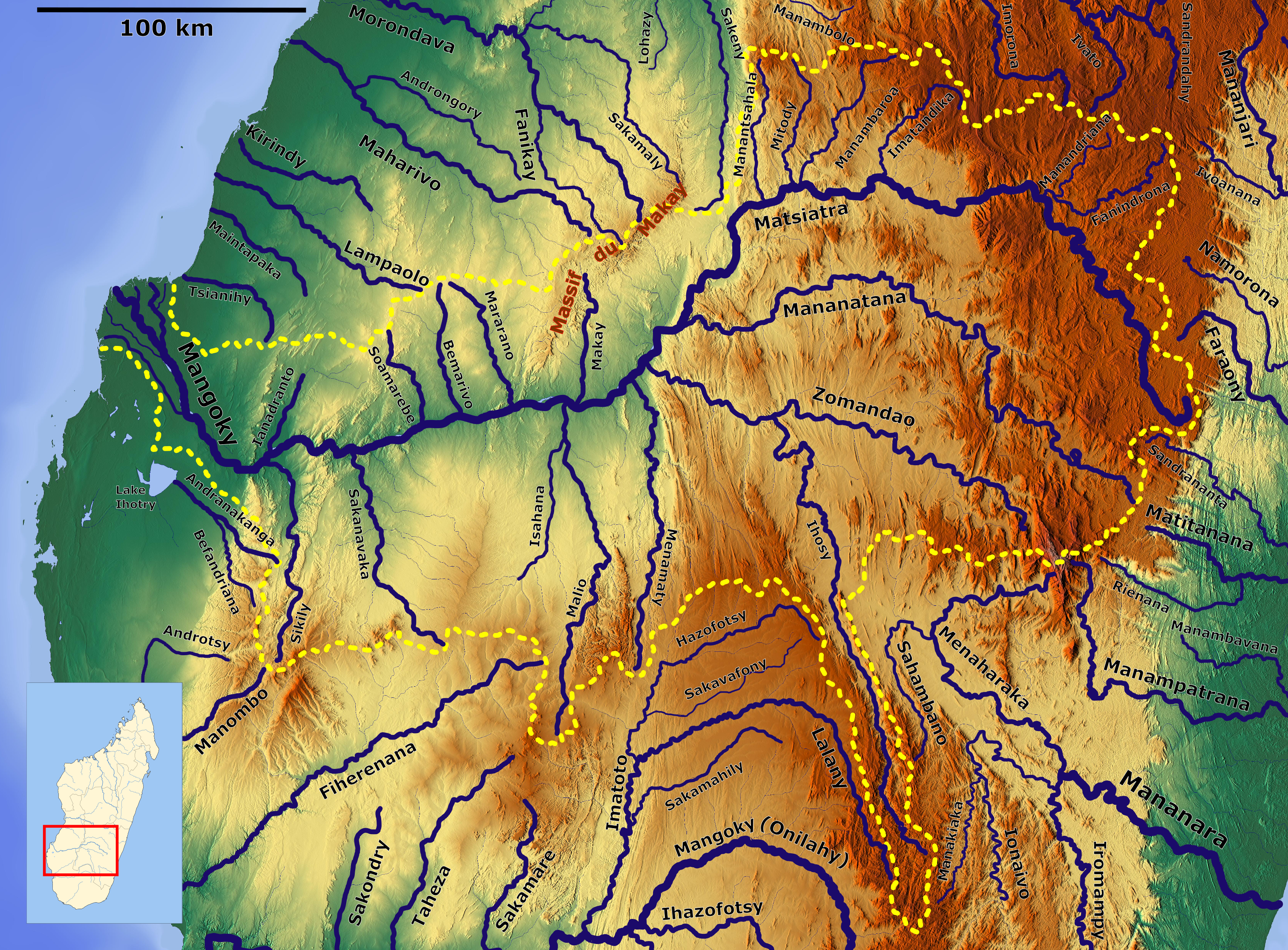
Mangoky Bassin
