= Haute Matsiatra =

Coordinates: 21.45°S 47.087°E

Haute Matsiatra Region Matsiatra Ambony
- Region
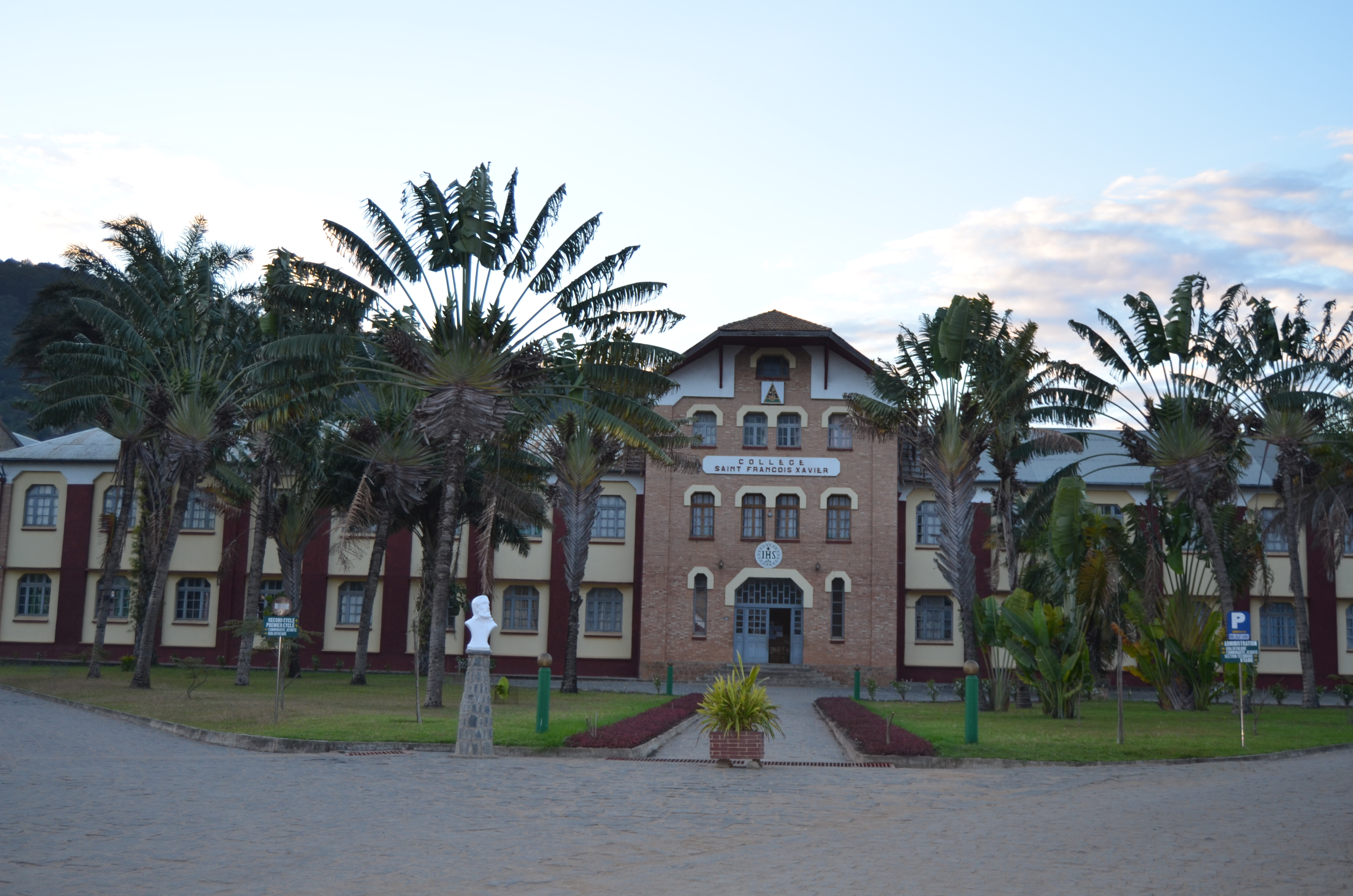
- Collège Saint François Xavier in Fianarantsoa

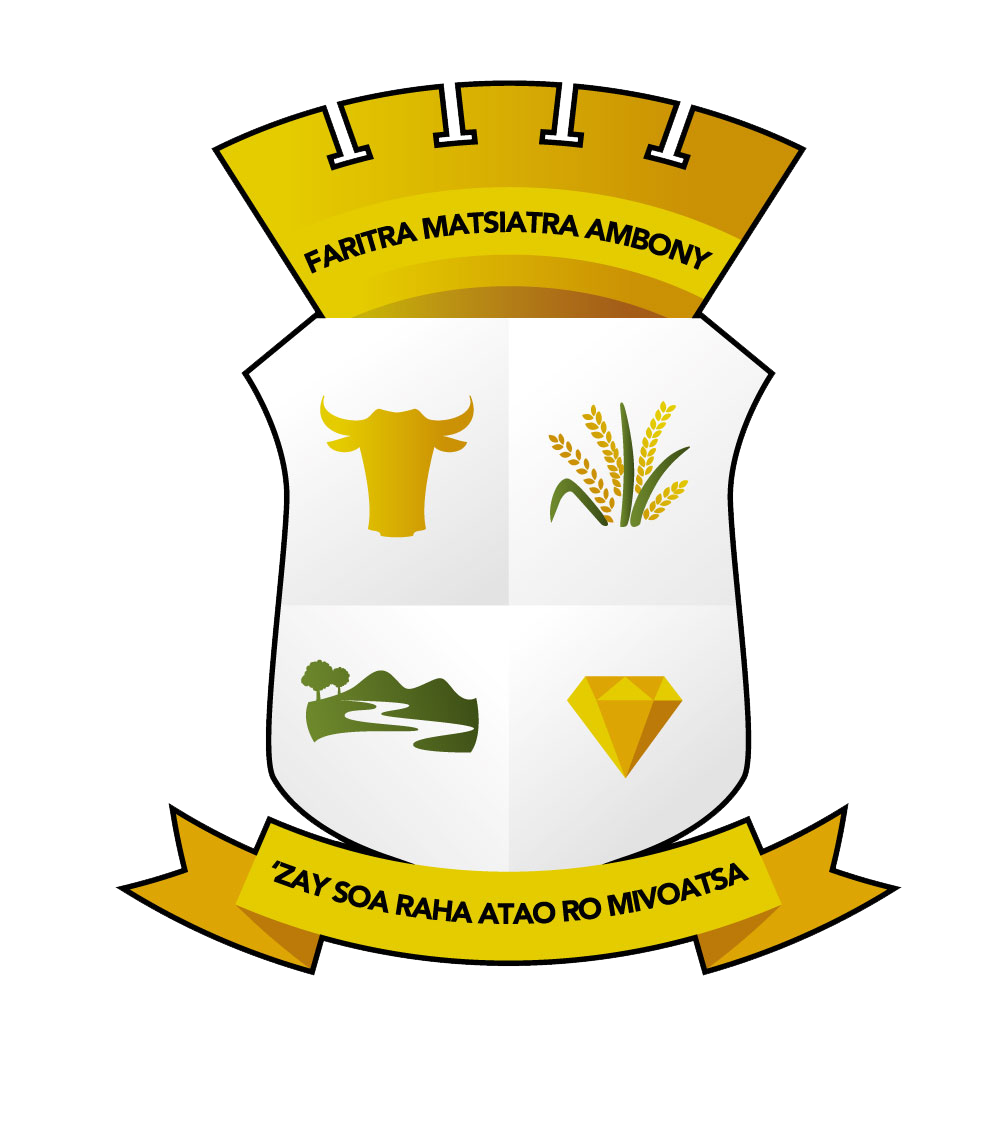
- Coat of arms

- Location in Madagascar
- Country: Madagascar
- Capital: Fianarantsoa

Government
  - Chef: Pierre Raymond Raherinjanahary

Area
  - Total: 21,080 km^{2} (8,140 sq mi)

Population (2018)
  - Total: 1,447,296
  - Density: 53.5/km^{2} (139/sq mi)
- Time zone: UTC3 (EAT)
- HDI (2018): 0.516 low · 12th of 22

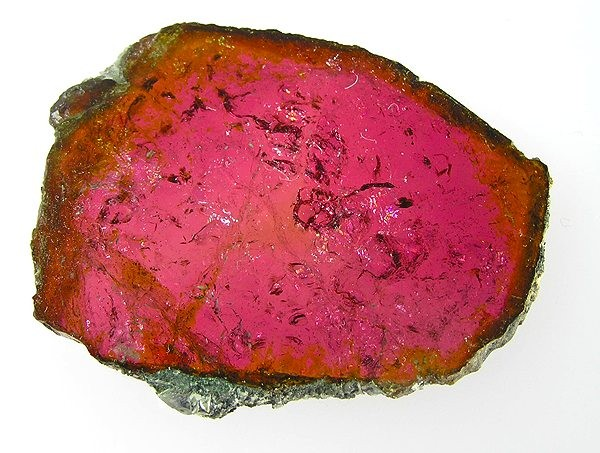
Liddicoatite, a tourmaline from Ambohimahasoa District. Size: 5.8 x 4.7 x 0.4 cm., polished slice.

Haute Matsiatra (in Malagasy: Matsiatra Ambony) is a region in Madagascar. It borders Amoron'i Mania region in north, Vatovavy-Fitovinany in east, Ihorombe in south and Atsimo-Andrefana in west. The capital of the region is Fianarantsoa, and the population was 1,447,296 in 2018. The area is 21,080 km^{2} (8,139 sq mi).

== Economy ==
Matsiatra Ambony is the top wine producing region of Madagascar, with wineyards in Ambalavao, Famoriana and Isandra (district). In Sahambavy is found the only tea production of the country.

== Administrative divisions ==
Haute Matsiatra Region is divided into seven districts, which are sub-divided into 84 communes.

- Ambalavao District - 17 communes; 215,094 inhabitants
- Ambohimahasoa District - 17 communes; 220,525 inhabitants
- Fianarantsoa District - 1 commune; 195,478 inhabitants
- Ikalamavony District - 8 communes; 91,797 inhabitants
- Isandra District - 13 communes; 132,971 inhabitants
- Lalangina District - 13 communes; 174,165 inhabitants
- Vohibato District - 15 communes; 201,666 inhabitants

== Transport ==
=== Airports ===
- Ambalavao Airport
- Fianarantsoa Airport

=== Railways ===
The Fianarantsoa-Côte Est railway has its endpoint in Fianarantsoa. It leads to the east coast and Manakara.

=== Roads ===
- National road 7 (Antananarivo - Tulear)
- National road 25 (Fianarantsoa - Mananjary)
- National road 42 A short secondary highway from Fianarantsoa to Isorana.
- National road 45 - a shortcut from National road 7 to National road 25.

== Rivers ==
The main river is the Matsiatra.

== Protected areas ==
- Part of Fandriana-Vondrozo Corridor
- Andringitra National Park
- Part of Ranomafana National Park
- Anja Community Reserve
- the cliffs & caves of Isandra
