= Sakalalina =

- Location in Madagascar
- Coordinates: 22°20′S 46°29′E
- Country: Madagascar
- Region: Ihorombe
- District: Ihosy
- Elevation: 707 m (2,320 ft)

Population (2001)
  - Total: 7,000
  - Ethnicities: Bara
- Time zone: UTC3 (EAT)

Sakalalina is a municipality in Madagascar. It belongs to the district of Ihosy, which is a part of Ihorombe Region. The population of the commune was estimated to be approximately 7,000 in 2001 commune census.

Primary and junior level secondary education are available in the town. The town provides access to hospital services to its citizens. The majority 99% of the population of the commune are farmers. The most important crop is rice, while other important products are bananas and cassava. Services provide employment for 1% of the population.

Five fokontany (villages) are part of this municipality: Bekijoly, Andemaka, Mahatsinjorano, Iangaty and Soaserana.

== Roads ==
Sakalalina is connected with Ihosy (56km) and the National road 7 by a secondary, unpaved road of 36 km.
