= Antsoha =

- Location in Madagascar
- Coordinates: 21°53′S 46°11′E
- Country: Madagascar
- Region: Ihorombe
- District: Ihosy
- Founded: 2004

Government
  - Mayor: Solay Manantsoa

Population (2018)
  - Total: 4,676
- Time zone: UTC3 (EAT)
- Postal code: 313

Antsoha is a municipality in Madagascar. It belongs to the district of Ihosy, which is a part of Ihorombe Region. The population of the commune was 4,676 in 2018.

== Geography ==
It is situated at 60 km north of the regions capital Ihosy by the National road 7, followed by 61 km of an unpaved road. The municipality is crossed by the Manatara river.

== Education ==
98% of the population are analphabets. A school exists only since 2006 inside the town hall.
