= Zazafotsy =

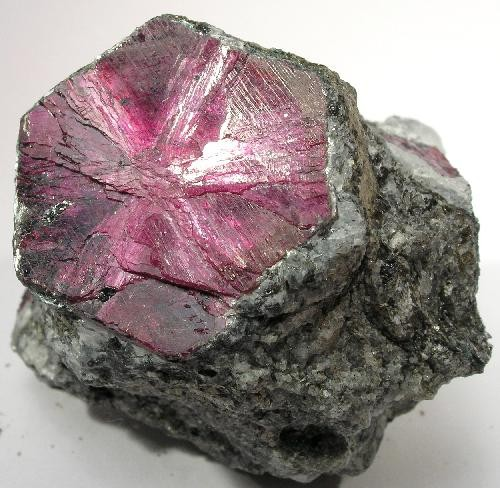
- Corundum from Zazafotsy

- Location in Madagascar
- Coordinates: 22°12′S 46°21′E
- Country: Madagascar
- Region: Ihorombe
- District: Ihosy
- Elevation: 832 m (2,730 ft)

Population (2018)
  - Total: 14,062
- Time zone: UTC3 (EAT)
- Postal code: 313

Zazafotsy (or Zaxafotsy) is a town and commune in Madagascar. It belongs to the district of Ihosy, which is a part of Ihorombe Region. The population of the commune was 14,062 in 2018.

Primary and junior level secondary education are available in town. The majority 90% of the population of the commune are farmers, while an additional 10% receives their livelihood from raising livestock. The most important crop is rice: other important products are peanuts and cassava.

== Geography ==
Zazafotsy is situated at the route nationale No. 7 (Fianarantsoa-Ihosy-Tuléar) at 36 km from Ihosy and 124 km from Ambalavao.

== Mining ==
At Zazafotsy (Amboarohy) there is a saphir corundum deposit and mine.
