= Ilakaka =

Town in Ihorombe Region, Madagascar

Coordinates: 22.68°S 45.21°E

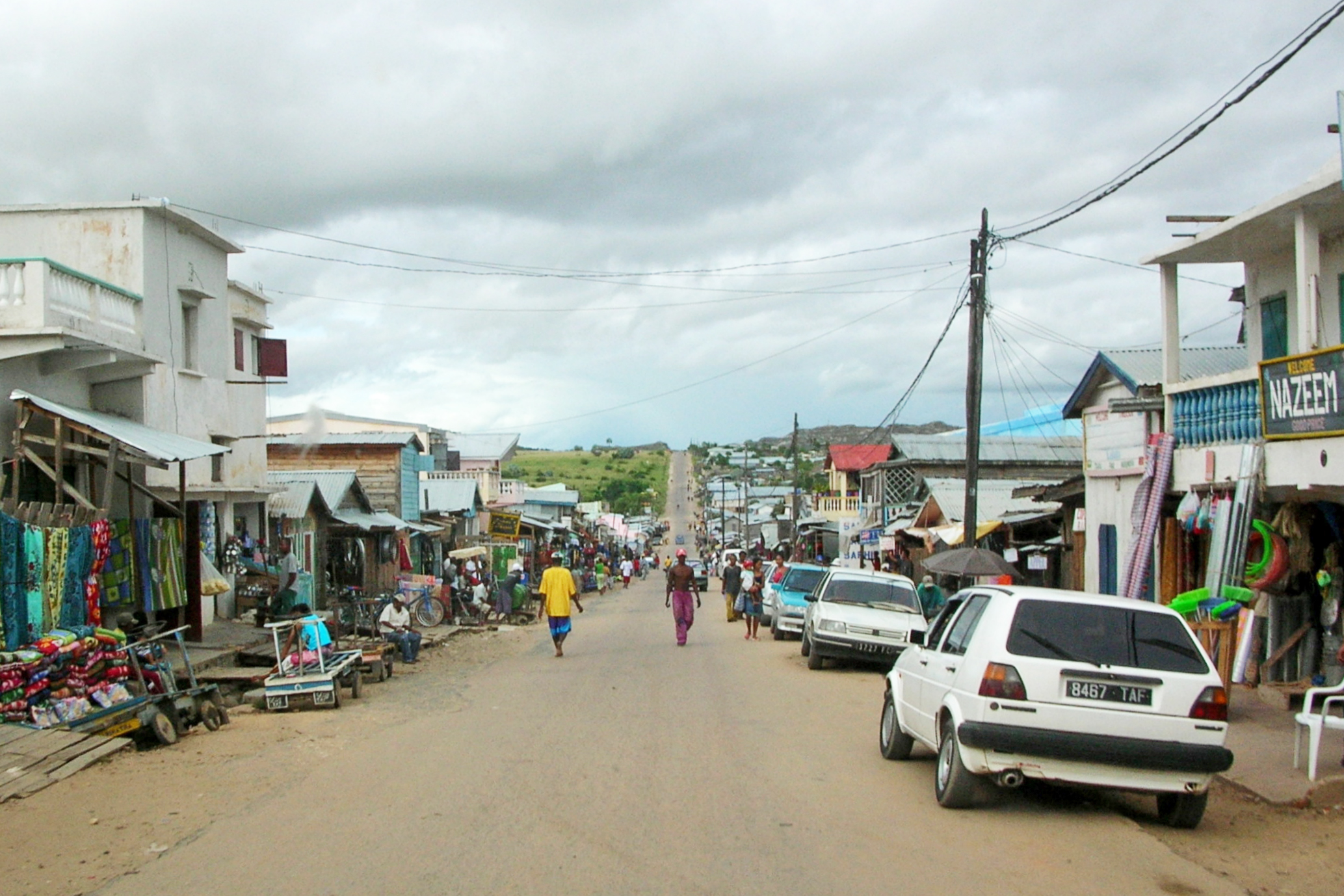
Ilakaka

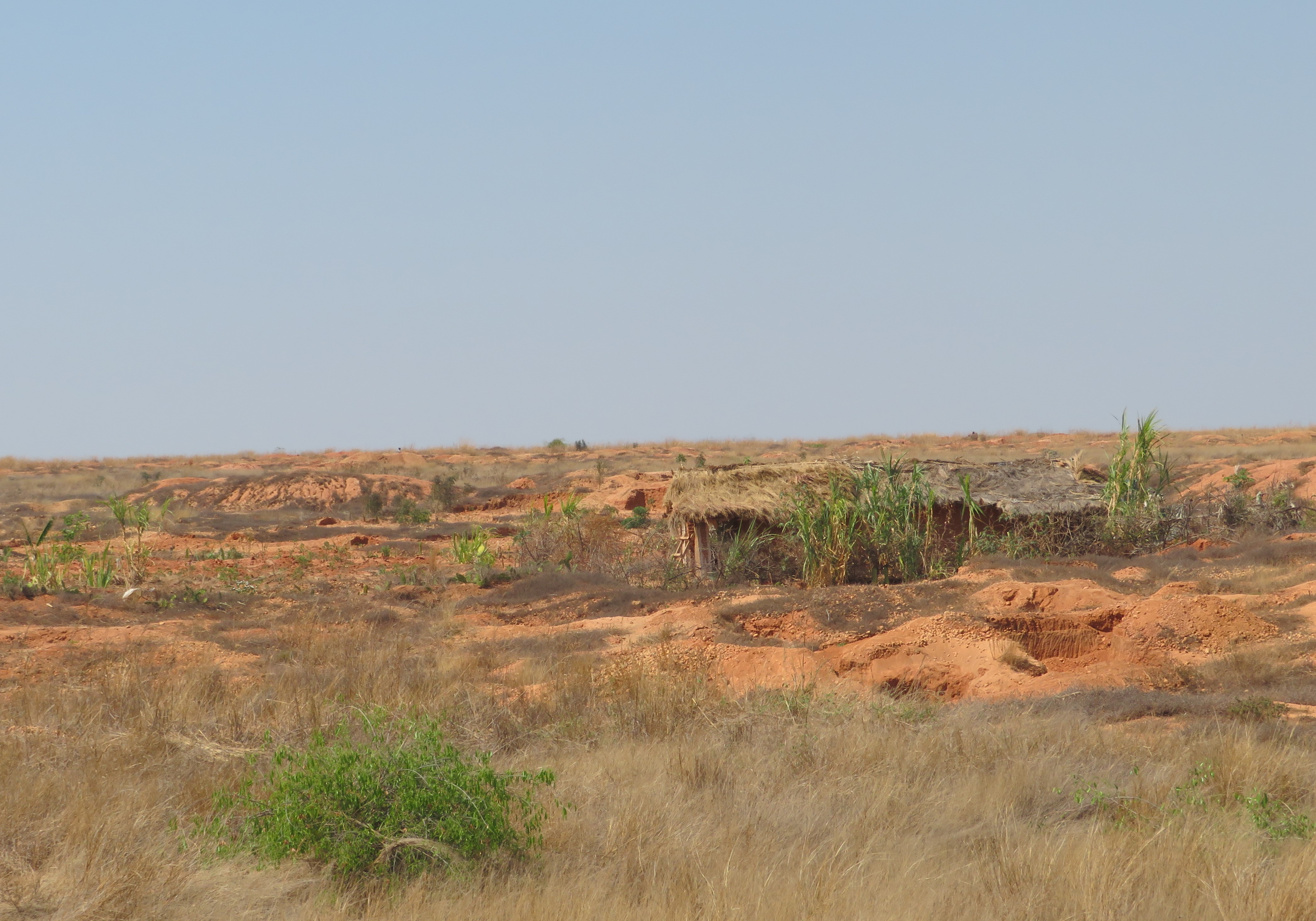
Miners' huts and tailings dump near Ilakaka

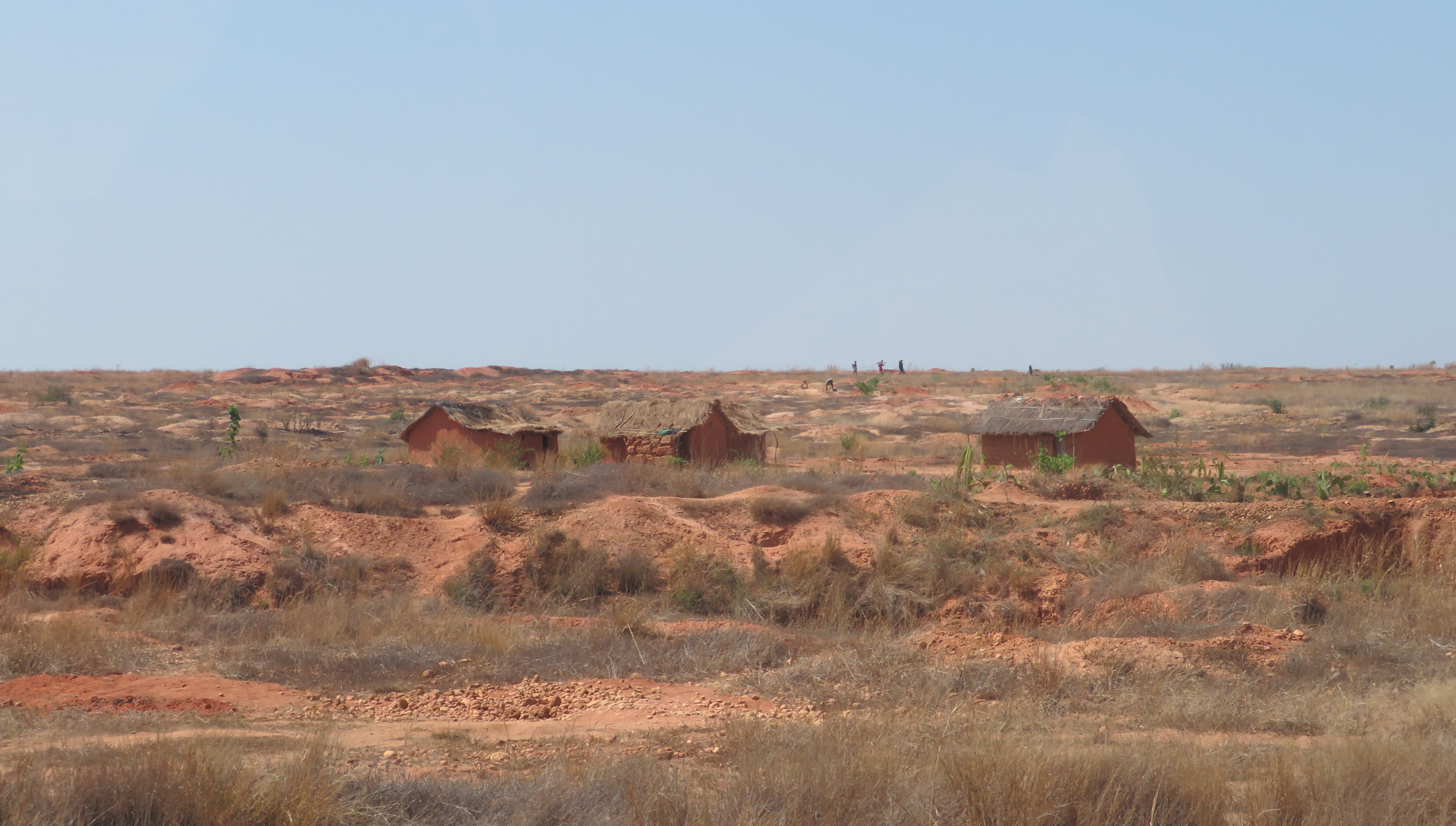
Miners' huts and tailings dump near Ilakaka

Ilakaka is a small town in Ihorombe Region in the south western part of Madagascar. In the early 1990s there were only about 40 residents in the area. After the discovery of one of Earth's largest known alluvial sapphire deposits in the valley of the Ilakaka river in 1998, the population had boomed to nearly 60,000 in 2005. Since high profits are at stake, violence is common in the town.

== Geography ==
Ilakaka is in Ihosy District, Ihorombe Region, 735 km south of Antananarivo, near Isalo National Park.

It is found along the Route nationale No.7 from Toliara (210 km) to Fianarantsoa (307 km) in southwestern Madagascar. It is situated at 210 km from Tuléar, 26 km from Ranohira and 84 km from Sakaraha.

== History ==
In 1998, after the discovery of an important sapphire mine, what was once a quiet rural village has been transformed into a Wild West town, a victim of "Sapphire fever," with thousands of arrivals hoping to stake a claim, complete with bars, brothels, and scores to settle. The fever has overrun the entire country and every day hundreds of people flow in from throughout the region.

== Demography ==
The village has exploded with the incessant influx. As of 2008 the population was about 30,000 according to local authorities, but the number is highly approximate given the incessant turnover. All 18 ethnic groups of Madagascar are represented.

== Religion ==
There is a mosque and a Church Rhema in Ilakaka.

== Administration ==
Ilakaka belongs to the district of Ihosy, in the region of Ihorombe, in the province of Fianarantsoa.

== Environment and infrastructure ==
Unofficial plots are pitted with wells, into which the miners descend to find a seam. The landscape has been remade by such operations.

The sheet metal shacks where the miners live have neither running water nor electricity, and there are very few paved roads.

The area is spotted with giant baobabs.
