= Soamatasy =

- Location in Madagascar
- Coordinates: 22°40′S 46°0′E
- Country: Madagascar
- Region: Ihorombe
- District: Ihosy
- Elevation: 992 m (3,255 ft)

Population (2001)
  - Total: 3,000
- Time zone: UTC3 (EAT)
- Postal code: 313

Soamatasy is a rural municipality in Madagascar. It belongs to the district of Ihosy, which is a part of Ihorombe Region. The population of the commune was estimated to be approximately 3,000 in 2001 commune census.

Only primary schooling is available. The majority 55% of the population of the commune are farmers, while an additional 43% receives their livelihood from raising livestock. The most important crops are rice and beans, while other important agricultural products are peanuts, maize and cassava. Services provide employment for 2% of the population.

== Geography ==
Soamatasy is situated at 50 km from Ihosy.
