= Tolohomiady =

- Location in Madagascar
- Coordinates: 22°12′S 46°21′E
- Country: Madagascar
- Region: Ihorombe
- District: Ihosy
- Elevation: 766 m (2,513 ft)

Population (2018)
  - Total: 3,768
- Time zone: UTC3 (EAT)
- Postal code: 313

Tolohomiady is a rural municipality in Madagascar. It belongs to the district of Ihosy, which is a part of Ihorombe Region. The population of the commune was 3,768 in 2018.

Primary and junior level secondary education are available in town. The majority 90% of the population of the commune are farmers, while an additional 10% receives their livelihood from raising livestock. The most important crop is rice: other important products are peanuts and cassava.

== Geography ==
Tolohomiady is situated at 6 km from Ihosy.
