= Analaliry =

- Location in Madagascar
- Coordinates: 22°47′S 46°15′E
- Country: Madagascar
- Region: Ihorombe
- District: Ihosy
- Elevation: 909 m (2,982 ft)

Population (2001)
  - Total: 5,000
- Time zone: UTC3 (EAT)
- Postal code: 313

Analaliry is a rural municipality in Madagascar. It belongs to the district of Ihosy, which is a part of Ihorombe Region. The population of the commune was estimated to be approximately 5,000 in 2001 commune census.

Only primary schooling is available. Farming and raising livestock provides employment for 10% and 90% of the working population. The most important crop is rice, while other important products are peanuts, beans, cassava and sweet potatoes.

== Geography ==
Analaliry is situated at 40 km from Ihosy.
