= Ranohira =

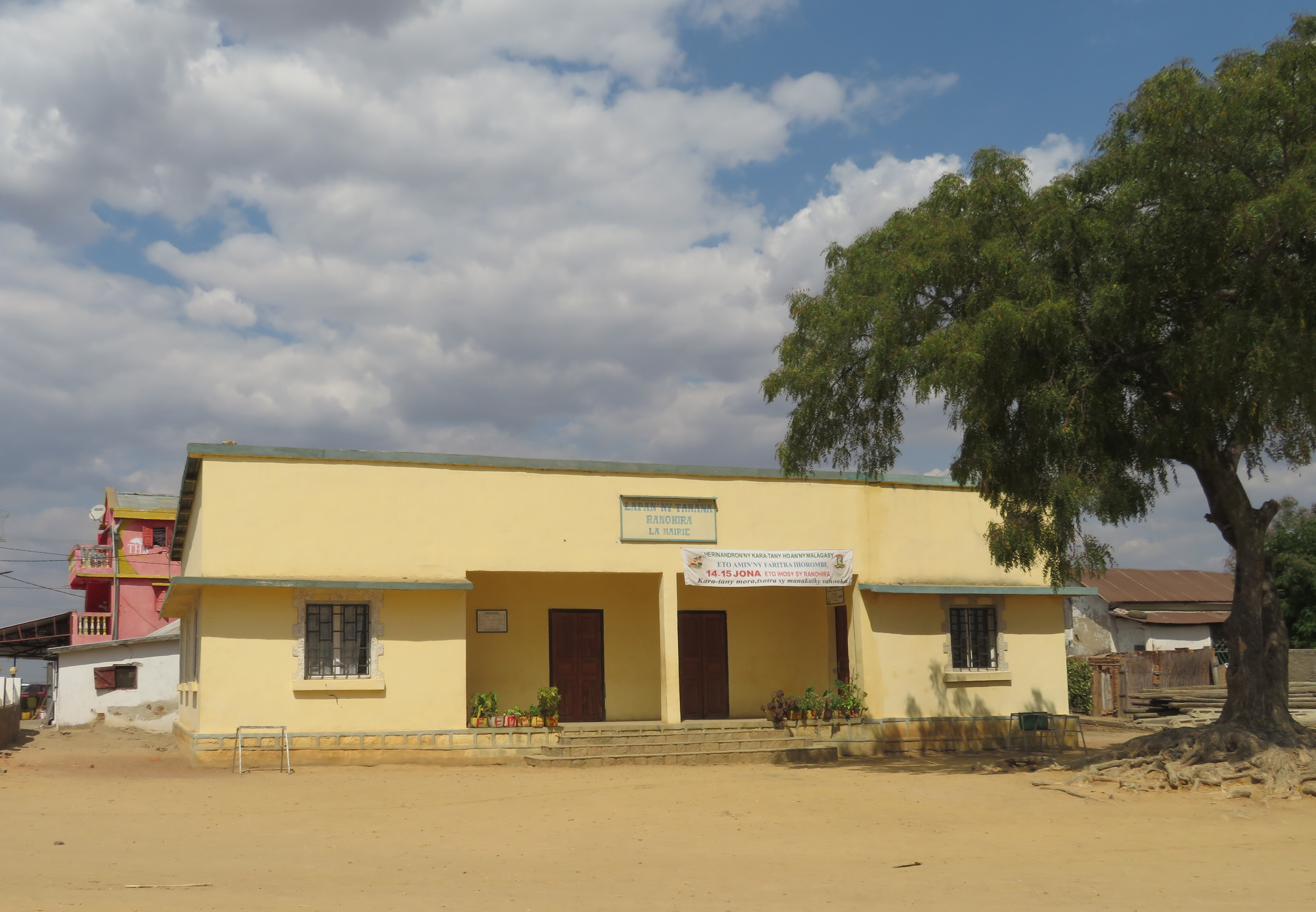
- Ranohira Town Hall

- Location in Madagascar
- Coordinates: 22°26′S 45°21′E
- Country: Madagascar
- Region: Ihorombe
- District: Ihosy
- Elevation: 1,090 m (3,580 ft)

Population (2018)Census
  - Total: 16,041
  - Ethnicities: Bara
- Time zone: UTC3 (EAT)
- Postal code: 313

Ranohira is a town and commune in Madagascar. It belongs to the district of Ihosy, which is a part of Ihorombe Region. The population of the commune was 16,041 in 2018. The nearest towns are Ilakaka at 26 km and Ihosy 93 km distance.

== Infrastructure ==
Ranohira is situated on the route nationale No. 7 from Tuléar to Fianarantsoa in the South-West of Madagascar. This highway passes the centre of the town. Ranohira has a hospital and several hotels. There is a small supermarket in the town as well as many shops. Primary and junior level secondary education are available in town. One of the mosts famous schools is Collège Notre Dame de l'Isalo.

== Economy ==
Ranohira is also a site of industrial-scale mining. The majority 85% of the population of the commune are farmers, while an additional 10% receives their livelihood from raising livestock. The most important crop is rice, while other important products are peanuts and cassava. Services provide employment for 5% of the population.

== Sights ==
Opposite the Town Hall (Mairie) a sports ground with a stand and various monuments can be visited. L'Eglise de Notre Dame de l'Isalo is a modern octagonal catholic church. Ranohira is the closest town to the Isalo National Park.

=== Climate ===
Climate data for Ranohira (1991–2020)
Month	Jan	Feb	Mar	Apr	May	Jun	Jul	Aug	Sep	Oct	Nov	Dec	Year
Record high °C (°F)	35.7 (96.3)	36.5 (97.7)	34.0 (93.2)	34.2 (93.6)	31.6 (88.9)	30.3 (86.5)	32.0 (89.6)	33.9 (93.0)	35.1 (95.2)	37.8 (100.0)	38.2 (100.8)	37.5 (99.5)	38.2 (100.8)
Mean daily maximum °C (°F)	29.0 (84.2)	29.0 (84.2)	29.3 (84.7)	28.5 (83.3)	26.3 (79.3)	24.3 (75.7)	23.7 (74.7)	25.8 (78.4)	28.5 (83.3)	30.6 (87.1)	31.1 (88.0)	30.0 (86.0)	28.0 (82.4)
Daily mean °C (°F)	24.3 (75.7)	24.2 (75.6)	24.1 (75.4)	22.6 (72.7)	20.3 (68.5)	18.1 (64.6)	17.3 (63.1)	18.9 (66.0)	21.2 (70.2)	23.4 (74.1)	24.6 (76.3)	24.6 (76.3)	22.0 (71.6)
Mean daily minimum °C (°F)	19.6 (67.3)	19.4 (66.9)	18.8 (65.8)	16.8 (62.2)	14.2 (57.6)	11.9 (53.4)	11.0 (51.8)	12.0 (53.6)	13.7 (56.7)	16.2 (61.2)	18.1 (64.6)	19.1 (66.4)	15.9 (60.6)
Record low °C (°F)	15.2 (59.4)	14.4 (57.9)	12.4 (54.3)	8.8 (47.8)	4.4 (39.9)	4.0 (39.2)	3.4 (38.1)	4.6 (40.3)	7.0 (44.6)	9.0 (48.2)	9.4 (48.9)	14.2 (57.6)	3.4 (38.1)
Average precipitation mm (inches)	228.9 (9.01)	156.9 (6.18)	95.6 (3.76)	39.6 (1.56)	11.6 (0.46)	3.7 (0.15)	4.0 (0.16)	2.7 (0.11)	9.0 (0.35)	35.4 (1.39)	83.3 (3.28)	150.8 (5.94)	821.5 (32.34)
Average precipitation days (≥ 1.0 mm)	15.2	11.6	8.2	3.4	1.7	0.7	0.6	0.6	1.1	3.8	6.6	13.0	66.5
Source: NOAA

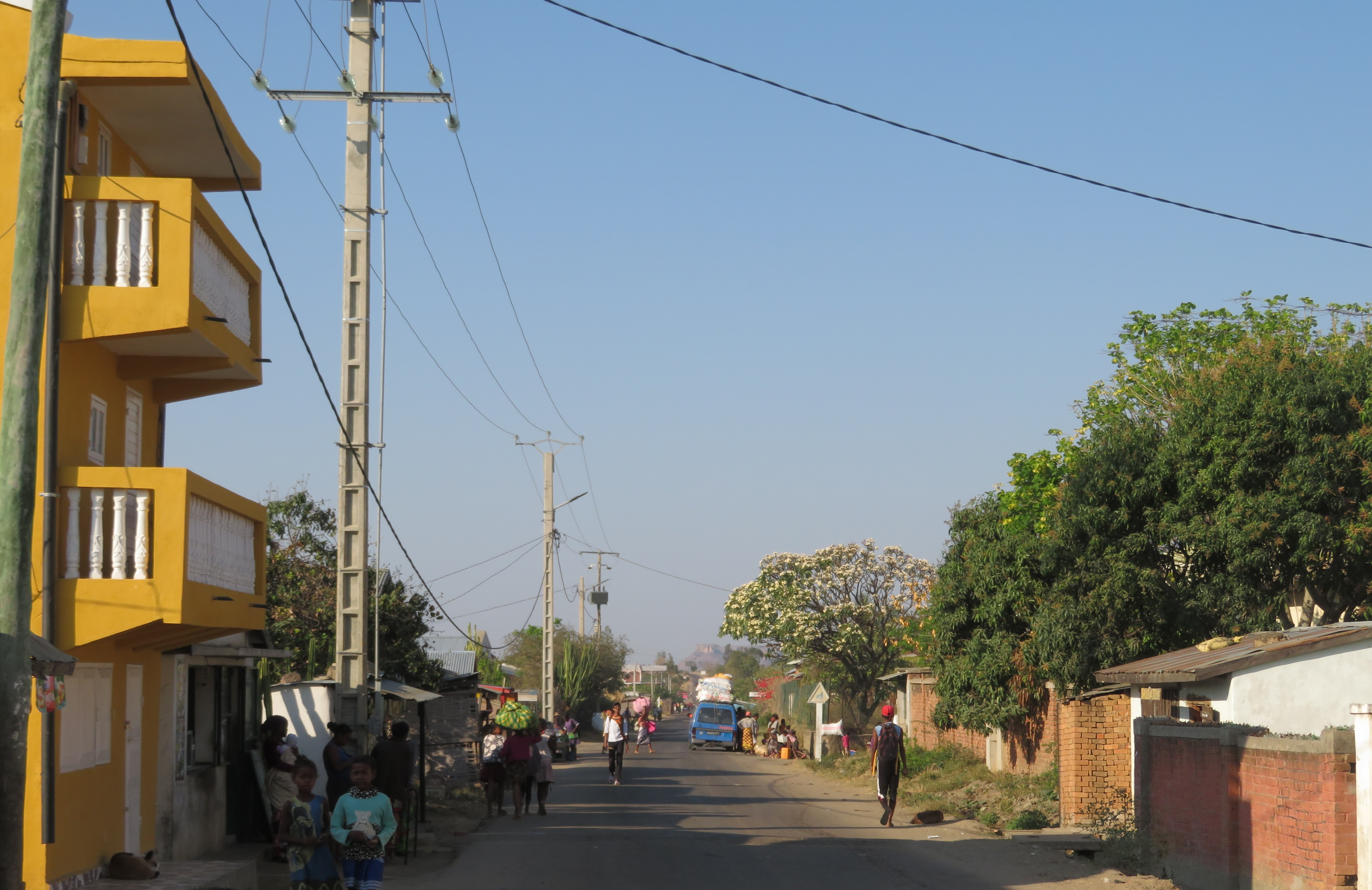
National road no. 7

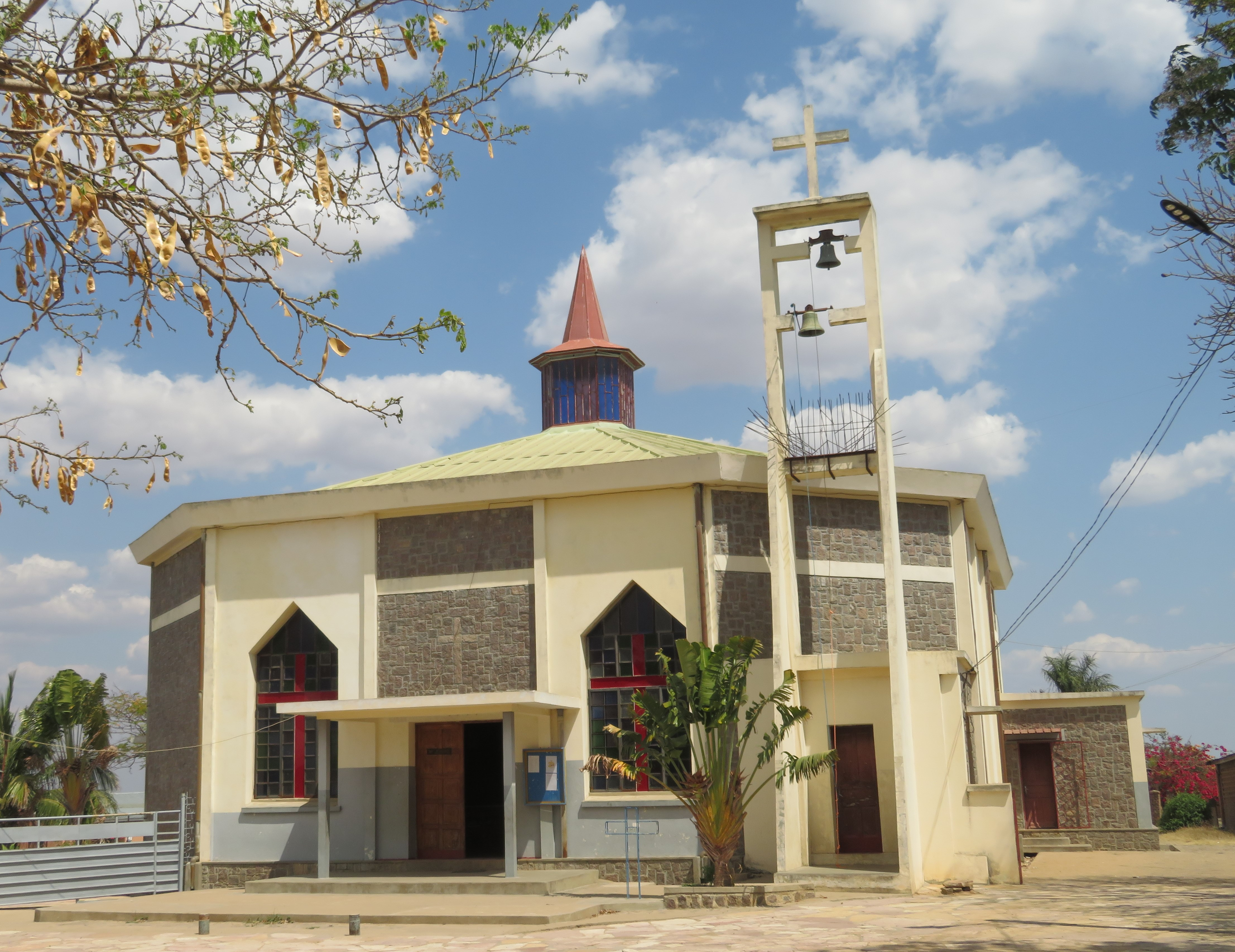
Catholic church

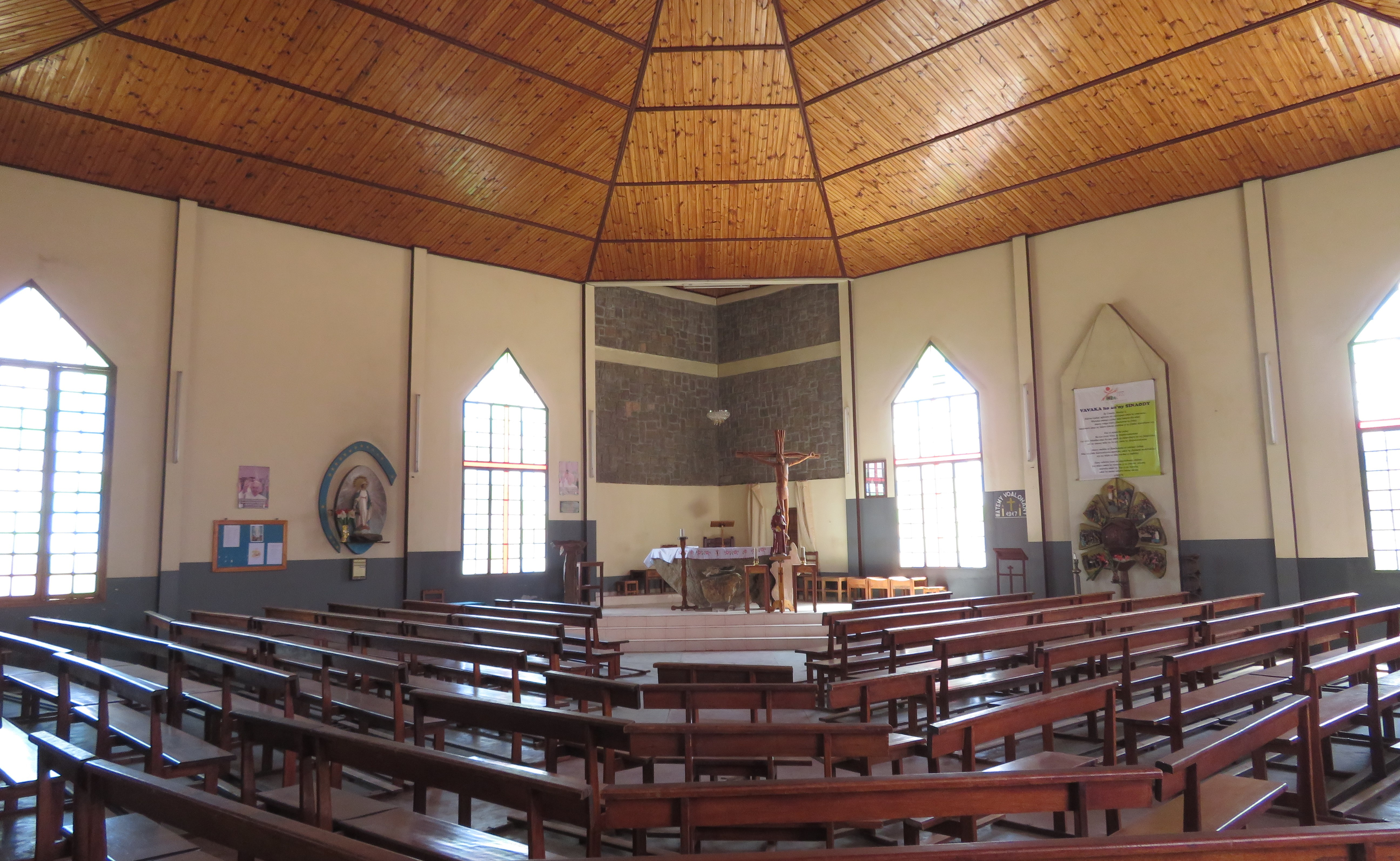
Catholic church

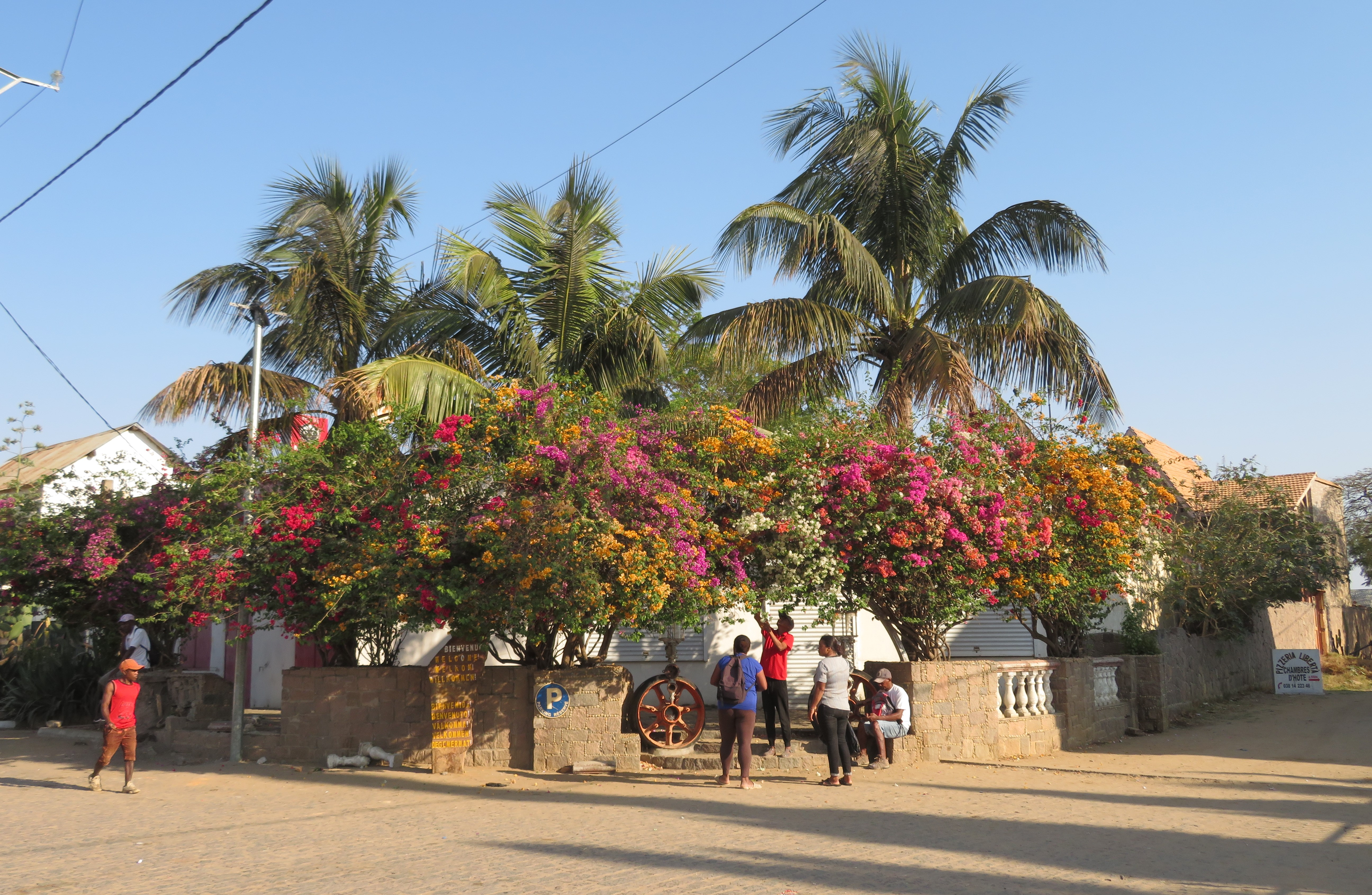
Main Street

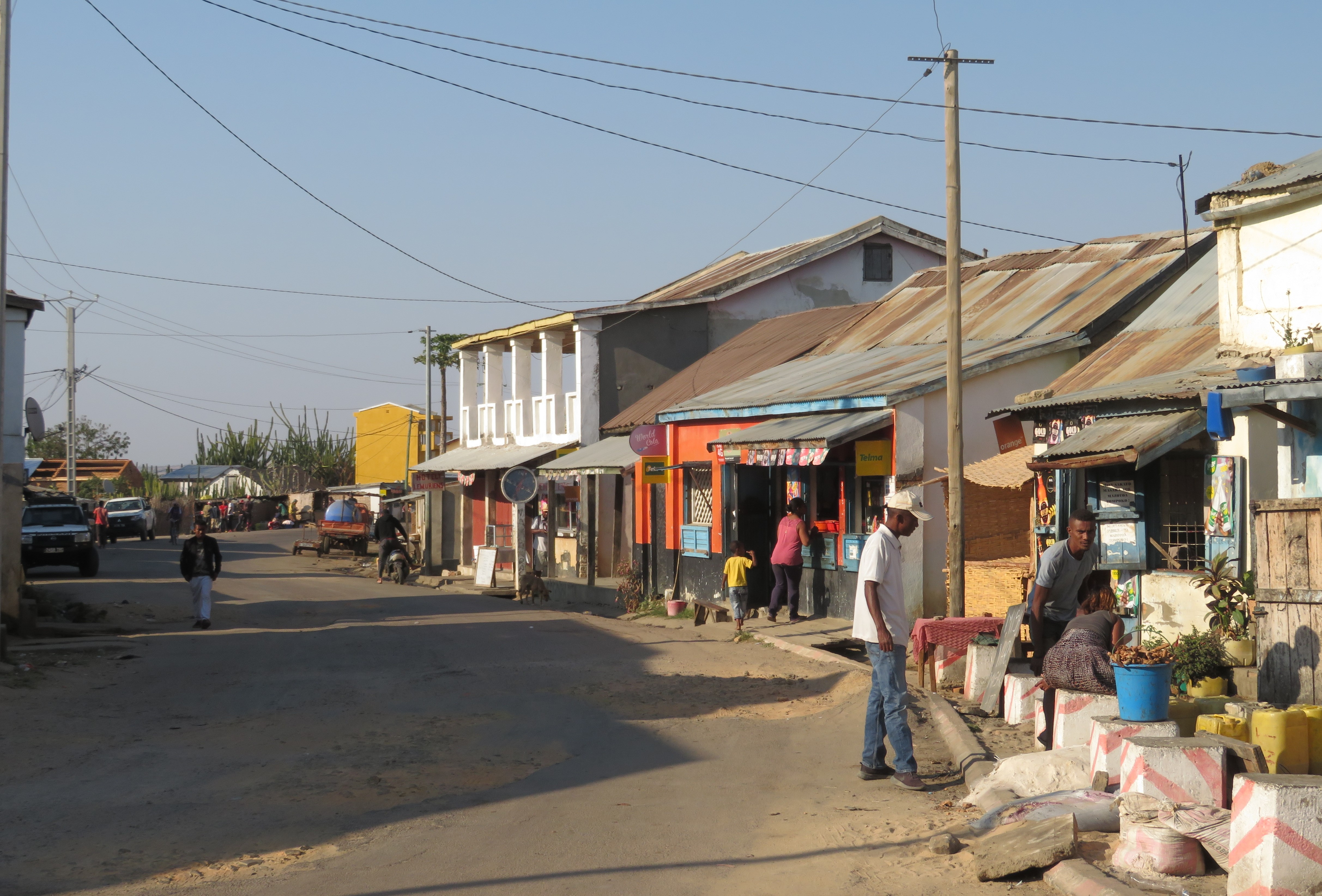
Main Street

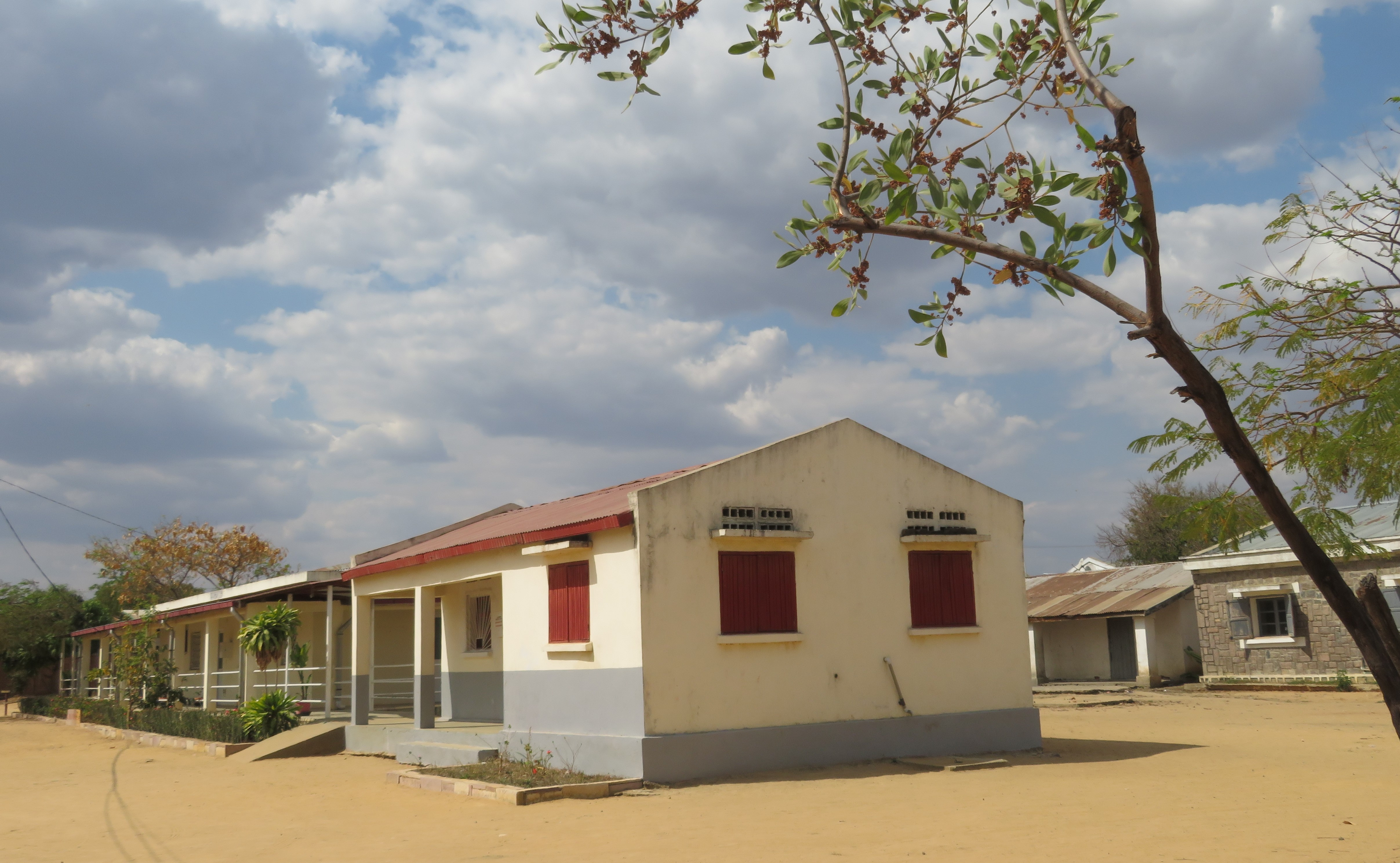
Hospital

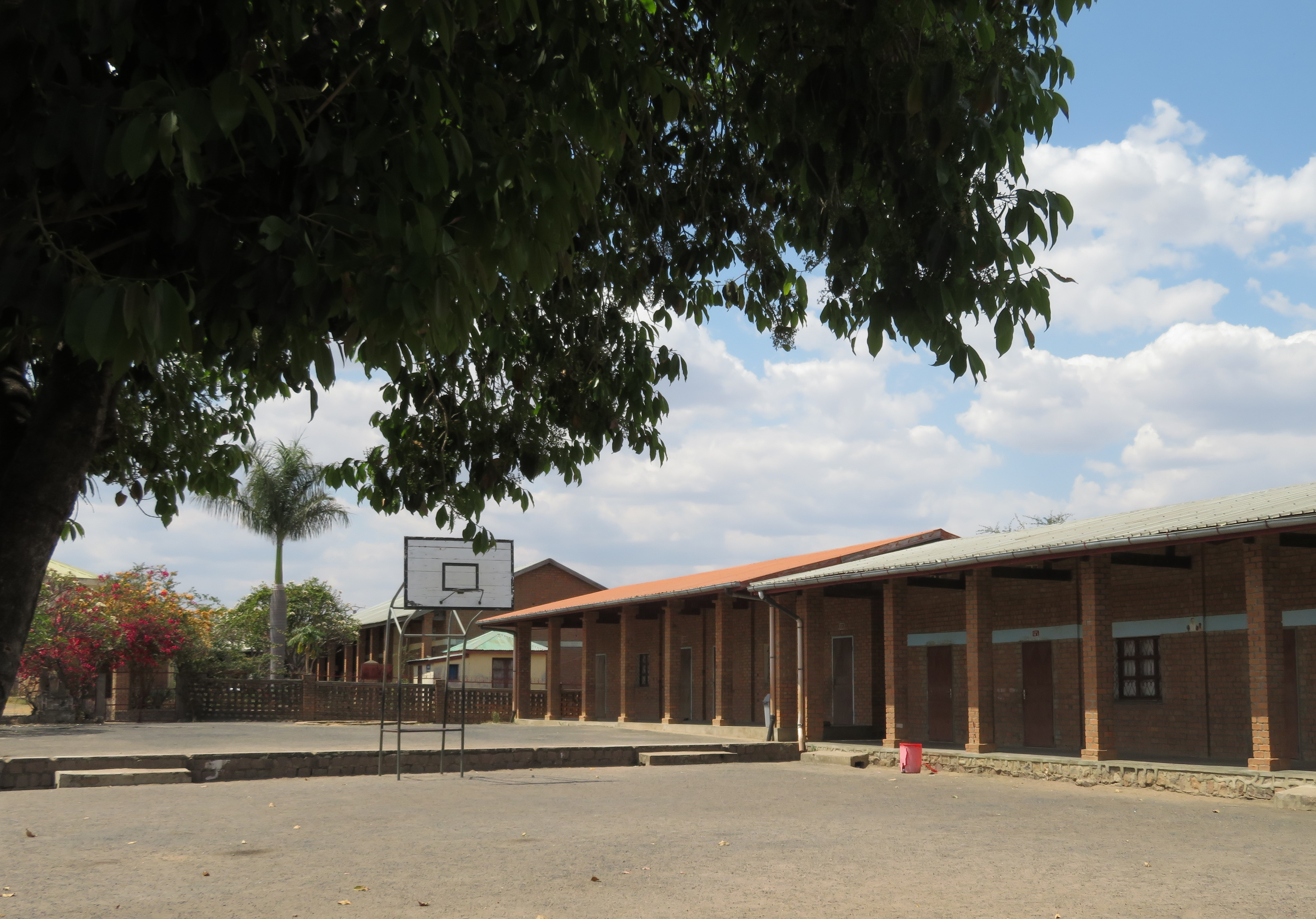
Collège Notre Dame de l'Isalo

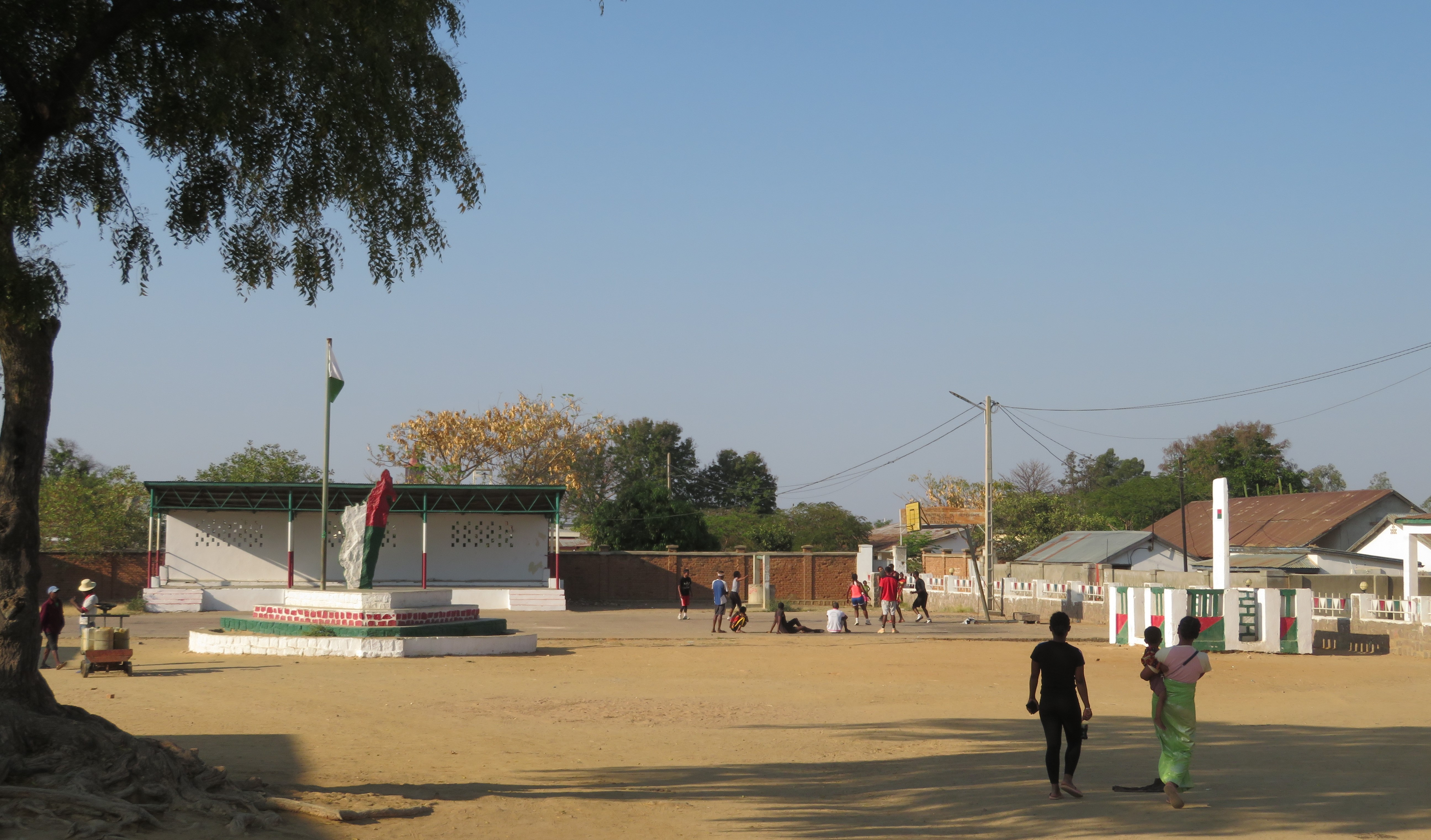
Sports ground and monuments
