= Andohan'Ilakaka =

Andohan'ilakaka
- Location in Madagascar
- Coordinates: 22°12′S 46°21′E
- Country: Madagascar
- Region: Ihorombe
- District: Ihosy
- Elevation: 832 m (2,730 ft)

Population (2018)
  - Total: 33,002
- Time zone: UTC3 (EAT)
- Postal code: 313

Andohan'ilakaka is a commune in Madagascar. It belongs to the district of Ihosy, which is a part of Ihorombe Region. The population of the commune was 33,002 in 2018.

Primary and junior level secondary education are available in town. The majority 90% of the population of the commune are farmers, while an additional 10% receives their livelihood from raising livestock. The most important crop is rice: other important products are peanuts and cassava.

This commune has known a rapid growth due to the discovery of sapphires in the 1990s.
