= Volambita =

- Location in Madagascar
- Coordinates: 22°10′S 46°46′E
- Country: Madagascar
- Region: Ihorombe
- District: Iakora

Population (2018)
  - Total: 5,617
- Time zone: UTC3 (EAT)
- Postal code: 311

Volambita is a commune in Madagascar. It belongs to the district of Iakora, which is a part of Ihorombe Region. The population of the commune was 5,617 in 2018.
