= Andiolava =

- Location in Madagascar
- Coordinates: 22°31′S 45°36′E
- Country: Madagascar
- Region: Ihorombe
- District: Ihosy
- Elevation: 915 m (3,002 ft)

Population (2001)
  - Total: 6,000
- Time zone: UTC3 (EAT)

Andiolava is a town and commune in Madagascar. It belongs to the district of Ihosy, which is a part of Ihorombe Region. The population of the commune was estimated to be approximately 6,000 in 2001 commune census.

Andiolava is served by a local airport. Only primary schooling is available. The majority 70% of the population of the commune are farmers, while an additional 30% receives their livelihood from raising livestock. The most important crop is rice, while other important products are peanuts and cassava.
