= Ranotsara =

Ranotsara may refer to the following municipalities in Madagascar:

- Ranotsara Nord or Ranotsara Avaratra, a municipality in Iakora District, Ihorombe
- Ranotsara Sud or Ranotsara Atsimo, a municipality in Befotaka Sud District, Atsimo-Atsinanana
