= Analavoka =

- Location in Madagascar
- Coordinates: 22°32′S 46°30′E
- Country: Madagascar
- Region: Ihorombe
- District: Ihosy
- Elevation: 632 m (2,073 ft)

Population (2001)
  - Total: 5,000
- Time zone: UTC3 (EAT)

Analavoka is a town and commune in Madagascar. It belongs to the district of Ihosy, which is a part of Ihorombe Region. The population of the commune was estimated to be approximately 5,000 in 2001 commune census.

Only primary schooling is available. Farming and raising livestock provides employment for 49.5% and 49.5%, respectively, of the working population. The most important crop is rice, while other important products are peanuts and cassava. Services provide employment for 1% of the population.
