= Satrokala =

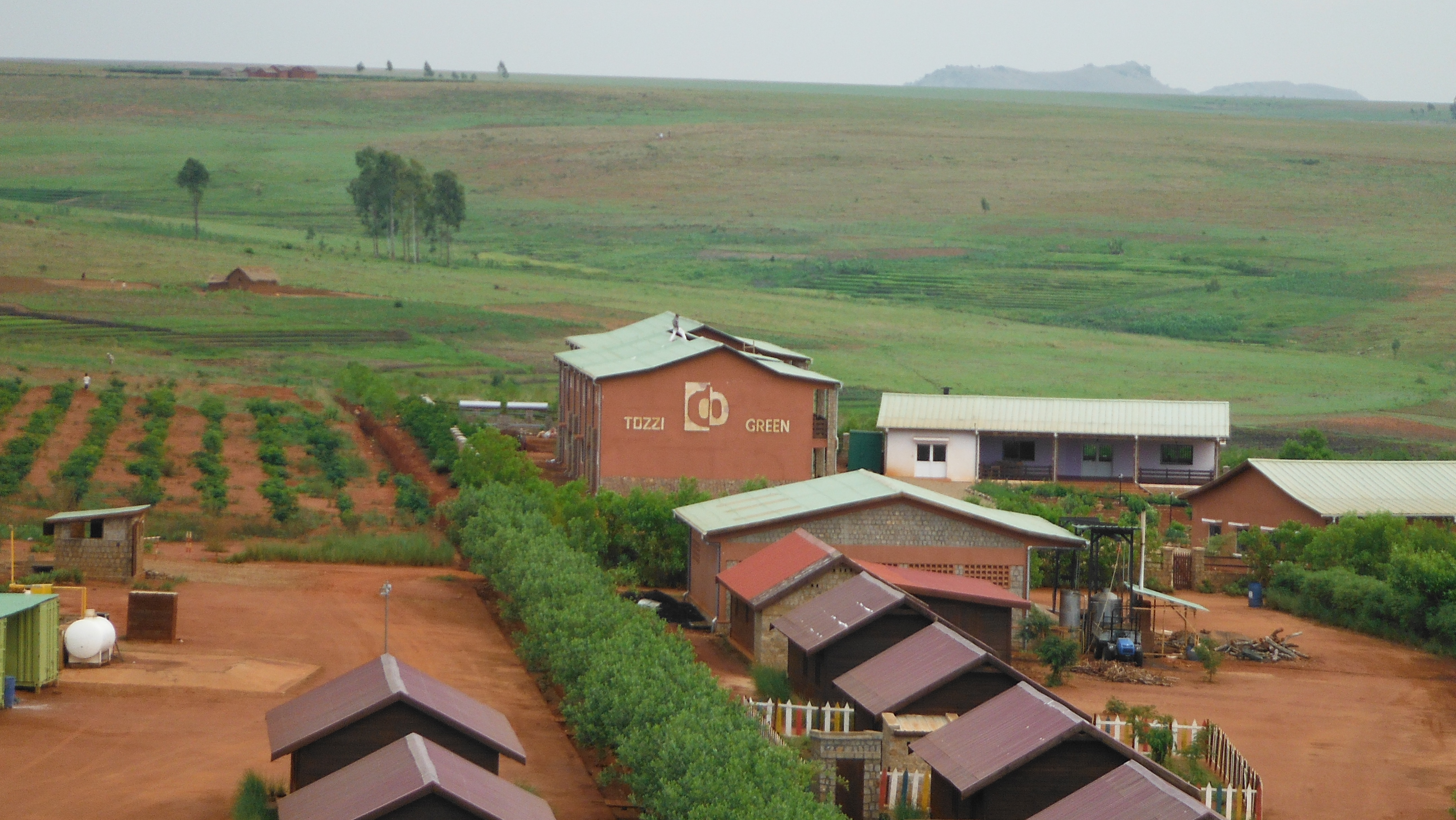
- Satrokala

- Location in Madagascar
- Coordinates: 22°3′S 45°37′E
- Country: Madagascar
- Region: Ihorombe
- District: Ihosy
- Elevation: 806 m (2,644 ft)

Population (2001)
  - Total: 10,000
- Time zone: UTC3 (EAT)

Satrokala is a town and commune in Madagascar. It belongs to the district of Ihosy, which is a part of Ihorombe Region. The population of the commune was estimated to be approximately 10,000 in 2001 commune census.

Only primary schooling is available. The majority 70% of the population of the commune are farmers, while an additional 30% receives their livelihood from raising livestock. The most important crops are cassava and peanuts, while other important agricultural products are beans, rice and taro.
