= Kilalaky (music genre) =

Traditional Malagasy music and dance genre

- Stylistic origins: Menabe Sakalava music
- Cultural origins: Menabe, southwestern Madagascar
- Typical instruments: Kabosy; Drum kit; Vocals; Keyboard; Bass guitar

Other topics
- Malagasy music

Kilalaky is a traditional music genre and dance from the Menabe region in southwestern Madagascar. It is recognized as one of the most energetic and popular traditional music styles in the country.

== History ==
Kilalaky has its roots in the cultural traditions of the Sakalava people in Menabe. The genre has evolved over time while maintaining a prominent role in local ceremonies and celebrations, such as the fitampoha festivities near the Tsiribihina River.

Kilalaky was very popular in Madagascar from the mid-2000s to the late 2010s. During the mid-2000s, the genre was modernized with the inclusion of modern instruments such as keyboard, bass guitar, and drum kit, used alongside traditional instruments like the kabosy.

== Dance ==
The kilalaky dance features coordinated movements of the head and hands, grounded footwork, and expressive hip motions. It is commonly performed in successive rows with synchronized choreography, emphasizing community participation and rhythm. During performances, dancers often form circles, kicking up dust and mimicking the movements of the lead dancer, frequently whipping their hair back and forth.

== Notable artists ==
Notable performers in the kilalaky genre include Barinjaka from the Bara region, Tsiliva and Bagzana from Menabe, as well as Rojovola, Sylange la Reine, Girl du Mena, and Tsiky Jolie. Emerging artist Malama Samborina comes from the Bongolava region.

== Controversy ==
Although kilalaky is widely celebrated in the central-southern and southern regions of Madagascar, particularly in Bara territory and surrounding areas, it remains less popular in urbanized zones and in the province of Antananarivo and Northern regions. It is known to be associated with rural people and often called in malagasy mozikan'ny tambanivolo. The genre has also faced controversy due to its association with dahalo (cattle thieves), who are known to favor kilalaky music during gatherings. This connection has contributed to a negative reputation in some parts of the country.
