= Mahasoa =

- Location in Madagascar
- Coordinates: 21°59′S 45°57′E
- Country: Madagascar
- Region: Ihorombe
- District: Ihosy
- Elevation: 748 m (2,454 ft)

Population (2018)Cenus
  - Total: 24,877
- Time zone: UTC3 (EAT)
- Postal code: 313

Mahasoa is a rural municipality in Madagascar. It belongs to the district of Ihosy, which is a part of Ihorombe Region. The population was 24877 inhabitants in 2018.

Primary and junior level secondary education are available in town. The majority 98% of the population of the commune are farmers. The most important crop is rice, while other important products are peanuts, maize and cassava. Additionally fishing employs 2% of the population.
