= FC Ihosy =

Malagasy football club

Ihosy
- Full name: Ihosy FC
- Ground: Stade Maître Kira; Toliara, Madagascar
- Capacity: 5,000
- League: THB Champions League

Ihosy FC is a Malagasy football club based in Ihosy in the Ihorombe Region in central south Madagascar.

The team plays in THB Champions League.

== Stadium ==
Currently the team plays at the 5000 capacity Stade Maître Kira.

== League participations ==
- THB Champions League: 2011-
- Madagascar Second Division:
