= Irina, Madagascar =

Irina
- Location in Madagascar
- Coordinates: 22°26′S 46°6′E
- Country: Madagascar
- Region: Ihorombe
- District: Ihosy
- Elevation: 740 m (2,430 ft)

Population (2001)
  - Total: 5,000
- Time zone: UTC3 (EAT)
- Postal code: 313

Irina is a rural municipality in Madagascar. It belongs to the district of Ihosy, which is a part of Ihorombe Region. The population of the commune was estimated to be approximately 5,000 in 2001 commune census.

It is situated on the western banks of the Ihosy River.

Only primary schooling is available. The majority 66.6% of the population of the commune are farmers, while an additional 33.3% receives their livelihood from raising livestock. The most important crop is rice, while other important products are cassava, tobacco and tomato. Services provide employment for 0.1% of the population.
