= Begogo =

- Location in Madagascar
- Coordinates: 23°29′S 46°43′E
- Country: Madagascar
- Region: Ihorombe
- District: Iakora
- Elevation: 718 m (2,356 ft)

Population (2018)
  - Total: 11,146
- Time zone: UTC3 (EAT)

Begogo is a rural commune in Madagascar. It belongs to the district of Iakora, which is a part of Ihorombe Region. The population of the commune was 11,146 in 2018.

Only primary schooling is available. Farming and raising livestock provides employment for 49.95% and 49.95% of the working population. The most important crops are rice and beans, while other important agricultural products are peanuts and cassava. Services provide employment for 0.1% of the population.

== See also ==
- the Kalambatritra Reserve that is situated in this municipality.
