= Ambatolahy, Ihosy =

Ambatolahy
- Location in Madagascar
- Coordinates: 22°32′S 46°0′E
- Country: Madagascar
- Region: Ihorombe
- District: Ihosy
- Elevation: 1,059 m (3,474 ft)

Population (2001)
  - Total: 10,000
- Time zone: UTC3 (EAT)

Ambatolahy is a town and commune in Madagascar. It belongs to the district of Ihosy, which is a part of Ihorombe Region. The population of the commune was estimated to be approximately 10,000 in 2001 commune census.

Only primary schooling is available. The majority 90% of the population of the commune are farmers, while an additional 10% receives their livelihood from raising livestock. The most important crop is rice, while other important products are sugarcane and cassava.
