= Menamaty Iloto =

- Location in Madagascar
- Coordinates: 21°57′S 45°24′E
- Country: Madagascar
- Region: Ihorombe
- District: Ihosy
- Elevation: 376 m (1,234 ft)

Population (2001)
  - Total: 5,000
- Time zone: UTC3 (EAT)

Menamaty Iloto is a town and commune in Madagascar. It belongs to the district of Ihosy, which is a part of Ihorombe Region. The population of the commune was estimated to be approximately 5,000 in 2001 commune census.

Only primary schooling is available. Farming and raising livestock provides employment for 15% and 85% of the working population. The most important crops are rice and cassava; also peanuts is an important agricultural product.
