= Ihosy District =

- District
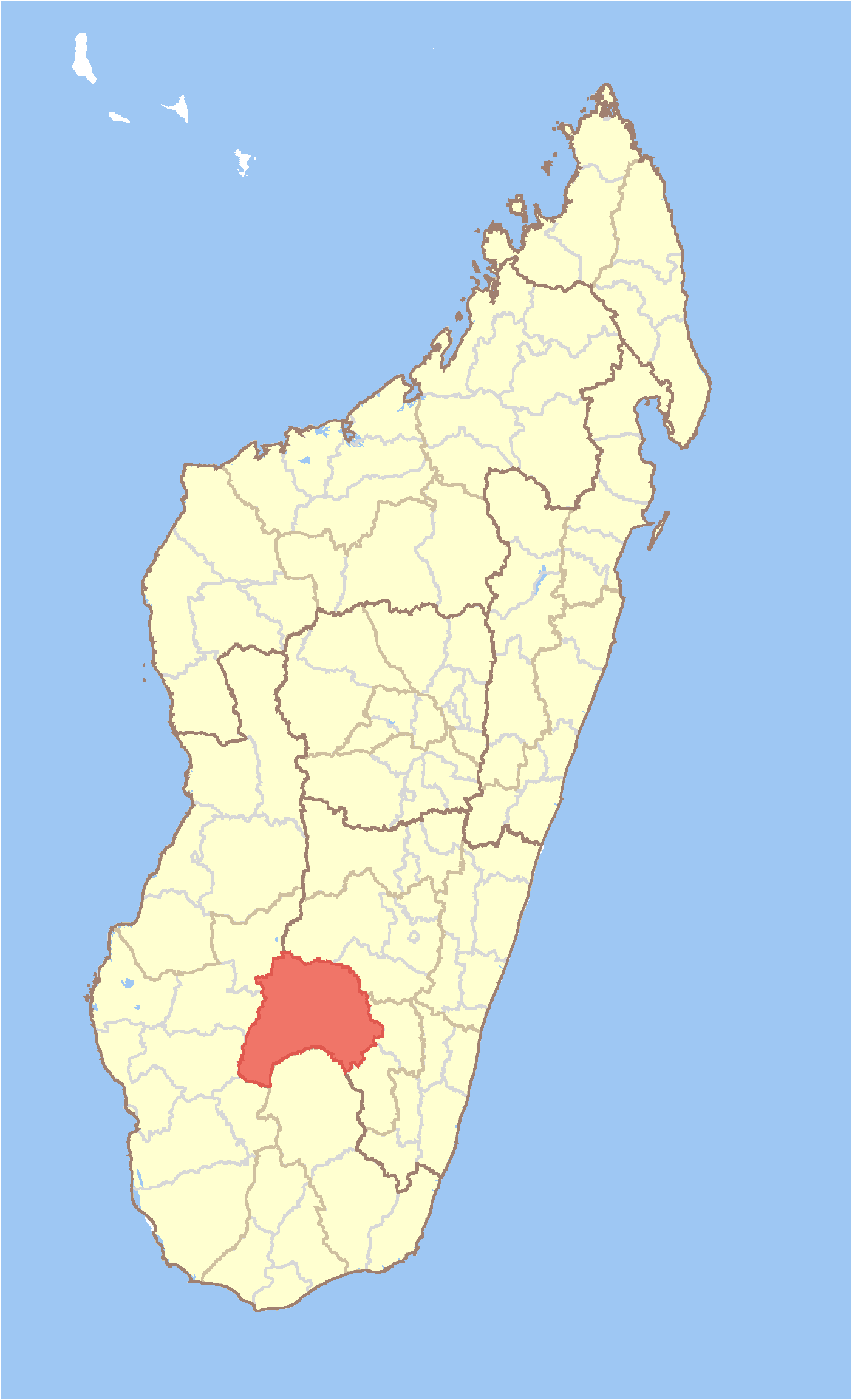
- Location in Madagascar
- Coordinates: 22°24′S 46°07′E
- Country: Madagascar
- Region: Ihorombe

Area
  - Total: 17,358 km^{2} (6,702 sq mi)

Population (2018)
  - Total: 292,880
  - Ethnicities: Bara
- Time zone: UTC3 (EAT)
- Postal code: 313

Ihosy is a district in south-eastern Madagascar. It is a part of Ihorombe Region and borders the districts of Ikalamavony in north, Ambalavao in northeast, Ivohibe in east, Iakora in southeast, Betroka in south, Benenitra in southwest, Sakaraha and Ankazoabo Sud in west and Beroraha in the South West. The area is 17,358 km^{2} (6,702 sq mi) and the population was 292,880 in 2018.

== Communes ==
The district is further divided into 20 communes:

- Ambatolahy
- Ambia
- Analaliry
- Analavoka
- Andiolava
- Andohan'ilakaka
- Ankily
- Antsoha
- Ihosy
- Ilakaka
- Irina
- Mahasoa
- Menamaty Iloto
- Ranohira
- Sahambano
- Sakalalina
- Satrokala
- Soamatasy
- Tolohomiady
- Zazafotsy
