= Ankily =

- Location in Madagascar
- Coordinates: 22°23′S 46°5′E
- Country: Madagascar
- Region: Ihorombe
- District: Ihosy
- Elevation: 750 m (2,460 ft)

Population (2007)
  - Total: 10,121
- Time zone: UTC3 (EAT)
- Postal code: 313

Ankily is a rural municipality in Madagascar. It belongs to the district of Ihosy, which is a part of Ihorombe Region.

Only primary schooling is available. The majority 74% of the population of the commune are farmers, while an additional 10% receives their livelihood from raising livestock. The most important crop is rice, while other important products are peanuts, beans, maize and cassava. Services provide employment for 1% of the population. Additionally fishing employs 15% of the population.

== Geography ==
Ankily is situated at 4 km from Ihosy.
