= Ranotsara Nord =

Ranotsara Nord Ranotsara Avaratra
- Location in Madagascar
- Coordinates: 22°47′S 46°35′E
- Country: Madagascar
- Region: Ihorombe
- District: Iakora
- Elevation: 635 m (2,083 ft)

Population (2018)
  - Total: 3,533
- Time zone: UTC3 (EAT)
- Postal code: 311

Ranotsara Nord (or: Ranotsara Avaratra) is a rural municipality in Madagascar. It belongs to the district of Iakora, which is a part of Ihorombe Region. The population of the commune was 3,533 in 2018.

Ranotsara Nord has a riverine harbour. Primary and junior level secondary education are available in town. The majority 95% of the population of the municipality are farmers, while an additional 4% receives their livelihood from raising livestock. The most important crop is rice, while other important products are peanuts and beans. Services provide employment for 1% of the population.

It is situated at the Ionaivo river and the unpaved National road 16.

== Mining ==
The region is rich in deposits of sapphires, ruby and chrysoberyl.
