= Iakora District =

- District
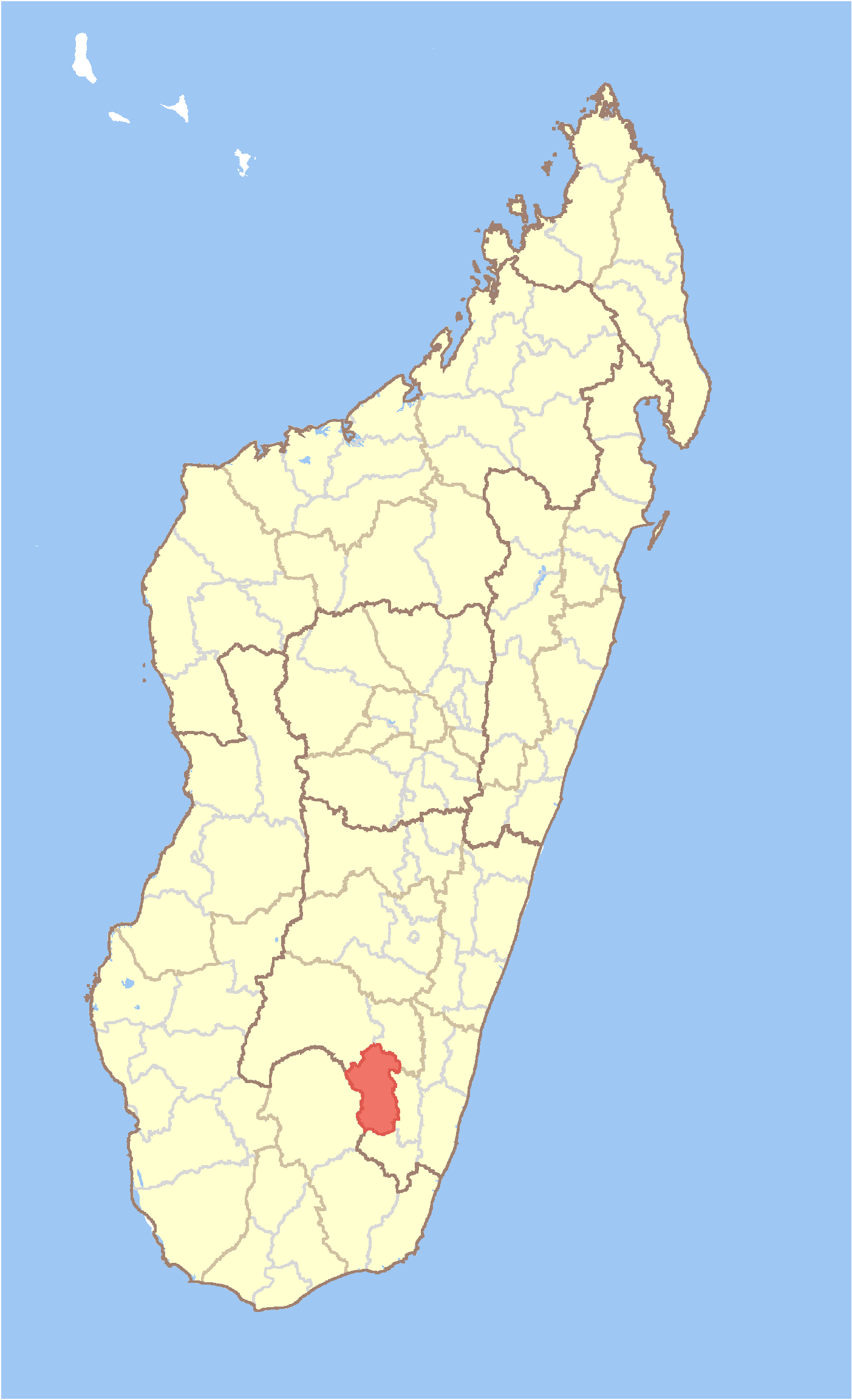
- Location in Madagascar
- Coordinates: 23°06′S 46°39′E
- Country: Madagascar
- Region: Ihorombe

Area
  - Total: 4,556.49 km^{2} (1,759.27 sq mi)

Population (2018)
  - Total: 55,380
  - Density: 12.15/km^{2} (31.48/sq mi)
- Time zone: UTC3 (EAT)
- Postal code: 311

Iakora District is a district in south-eastern Madagascar. It is a part of Ihorombe Region and borders the districts of Ihosy to the northwest, Ivohibe to the northeast, Midongy Sud to the east, Befotaka to the south and Betroka to the west. The area is 4,556.49 km^{2} (1,759 sq mi) and the population was estimated at 55,380 in 2018.

== Communes ==
The district is further divided into five communes:

- Andranombao
- Begogo
- Iakora
- Ranotsara Nord
- Volambita
