= Ambia, Ihosy =

Ambia
- Location in Madagascar
- Coordinates: 22°22′S 46°11′E
- Country: Madagascar
- Region: Ihorombe
- District: Ihosy
- Elevation: 699 m (2,293 ft)

Population (2001)
  - Total: 5,000
- Time zone: UTC3 (EAT)

Ambia is a town and commune in Madagascar. It belongs to the district of Ihosy, which is a part of Ihorombe Region. The population of the commune was estimated to be approximately 5,000 in 2001 commune census.

Only primary schooling is available. The majority 90% of the population of the commune are farmers, while an additional 9% receives their livelihood from raising livestock. The most important crop is rice, while other important products are vegetables and tomato. Services provide employment for 1% of the population.
