= Sahambano =

- Location in Madagascar
- Coordinates: 22°29′S 46°17′E
- Country: Madagascar
- Region: Ihorombe
- District: Ihosy
- Elevation: 687 m (2,254 ft)

Population (2001)
  - Total: 6,000
- Time zone: UTC3 (EAT)

Sahambano is a town and commune in Madagascar. It belongs to the district of Ihosy, which is a part of Ihorombe Region. The population of the commune was estimated to be approximately 6,000 in the 2001 commune census.

Only primary schooling is available. The majority 85% of the population are farmers, while an additional 14.5% receives their livelihood from raising livestock. The most important crop is rice, while other important products are peanuts, beans, maize and cassava. Services provide employment for 0.5% of the population.

== Mineral deposits ==
At Sahambano there are sapphire and corundum deposits.
