= Tsiliva =

- Born: Christophe Tsiliva Diddiot; 25 July 1982 (age 44); Ambovombe Androy, Madagascar
- Genre: Kilalaka
- Occupations: Singer, songwriter
- Instruments: Voice, percussion, bass guitar, electric guitar
- Formerly of: Terakaly

Tsiliva, born Christophe Tsiliva Diddiot, is a Malagasy musician who performs Kilalaky, a traditional genre of music from the southwestern interior of Madagascar. The son of a pastor, he was born on 25 July 1982 and raised in the western coastal town of Ambovombe Androy, near Morondava. As a child he enjoyed playing music and composing songs. Upon reaching secondary school, he formed or joined many local groups, including Cabalero Music, Tsirangoty, Diddiot Pro, Calypso, Mentalis Music and Fouad music, with whom he both performed and composed music. After graduating high school and earning his baccalaureat in management and communications, he played bass for the group Dadah de Fort Dauphin, later joining the groups Terana and Terakaly as a percussionist. With Terakaly, he performed for the first time at a major music festival, the Donia music festival at Nosy Be.

He launched his solo career in 2004, and the popularity of his first single, "Oh! le Tsiliva", released in December that year, catapulted him to success. His first concert was held on 27 March 2005. He has released two albums and three VCDs, as well as a single with Vaiavy Chila entitled "Chilalaky", which have been highly successful across the island. He tours continually throughout Madagascar and the Indian Ocean islands with an average of two shows per week, and often performs for the Malagasy diaspora in France. He typically performs with a large ensemble comprising six musicians, five backup singers and four dancers. He has expressed the goal of rendering Malagasy music universally accessible, following Bob Marley's example in popularizing reggae.

Tsiliva sings, dances, and plays percussion and guitar. Although he mainly performs kilalaka, he occasionally also performs other genres, including pop and ragga. In addition to his musical performances, he is a sound engineer for other bands and has expressed an interest in owning his own business in the future. He is also a father.

== See also ==
- Music of Madagascar
