= Route nationale 7 (Madagascar) =

Road in Madagascar

Location
- Country: Madagascar

Highway system
- Roads in Madagascar

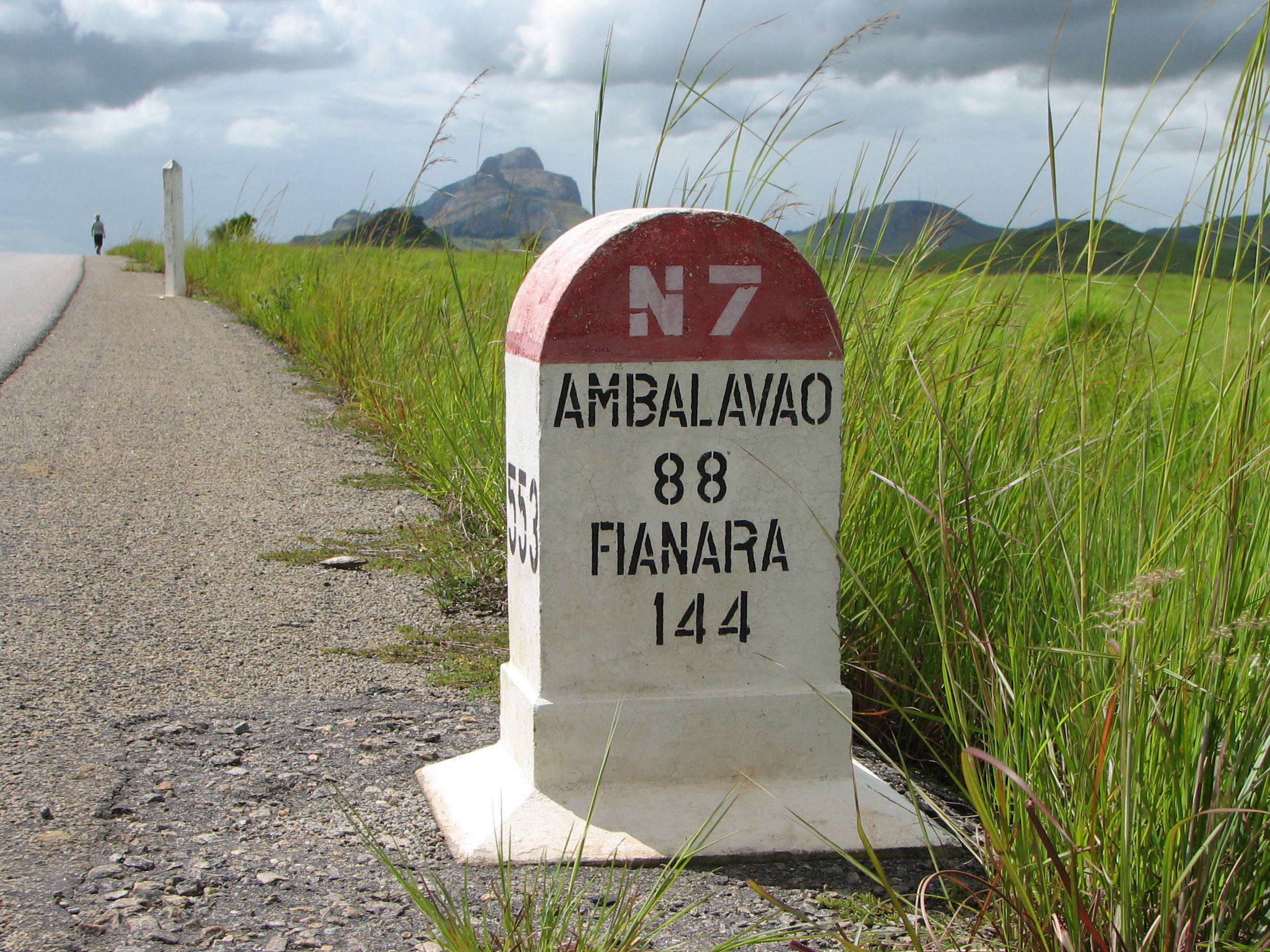
Route Nationale 7

Route nationale 7 (RN7) is a primary highway in Madagascar running 980km from the capital Antananarivo to Tulear at the south-west coast of the country. It crosses the regions of Analamanga, Vakinankaratra, Amoron'i Mania, Haute Matsiatra, Ihorombe, and Atsimo-Andrefana.

This is one of the most important roads of the country and relatively well maintained.

== Selected locations on route ==
(north to south)

- Antananarivo
- Ambohibary - intersection of RN43
- Ambatolampy (69 km)
- Antsirabe (170 km) - (junction with RN34 to Miandrivazo and Malaimbandy)
- Ambositra - (junction with RN35 to Malaimbandy and Morondava)
- Ambohimahasoa - (junction with RN25 to Mananjary)
- Fianarantsoa (412 km) - (Ranomafana National Park)
- Ambalavao (462 km) - (Andringitra National Park)
- Anja Community Reserve
- Zazafotsy (586 km)
- Ihosy - (604 km) (junction with RN27 to Farafangana)
- Ihosy - (junction with RN13 to Betroka and Tolanaro (Fort-Dauphin)
- Caves of Andranomilitry - (10 km from Ihosy)
- Ranohira - (697 km) - (Isalo National Park)
- Ilakaka
- Sakaraha - (793 km) (Zombitse-Vohibasia National Park)
- Andranovory - (junction with RN10 to Ampanihy and Ambovombe)
- Toliara (Tulear) (923 km)

== Gallery ==
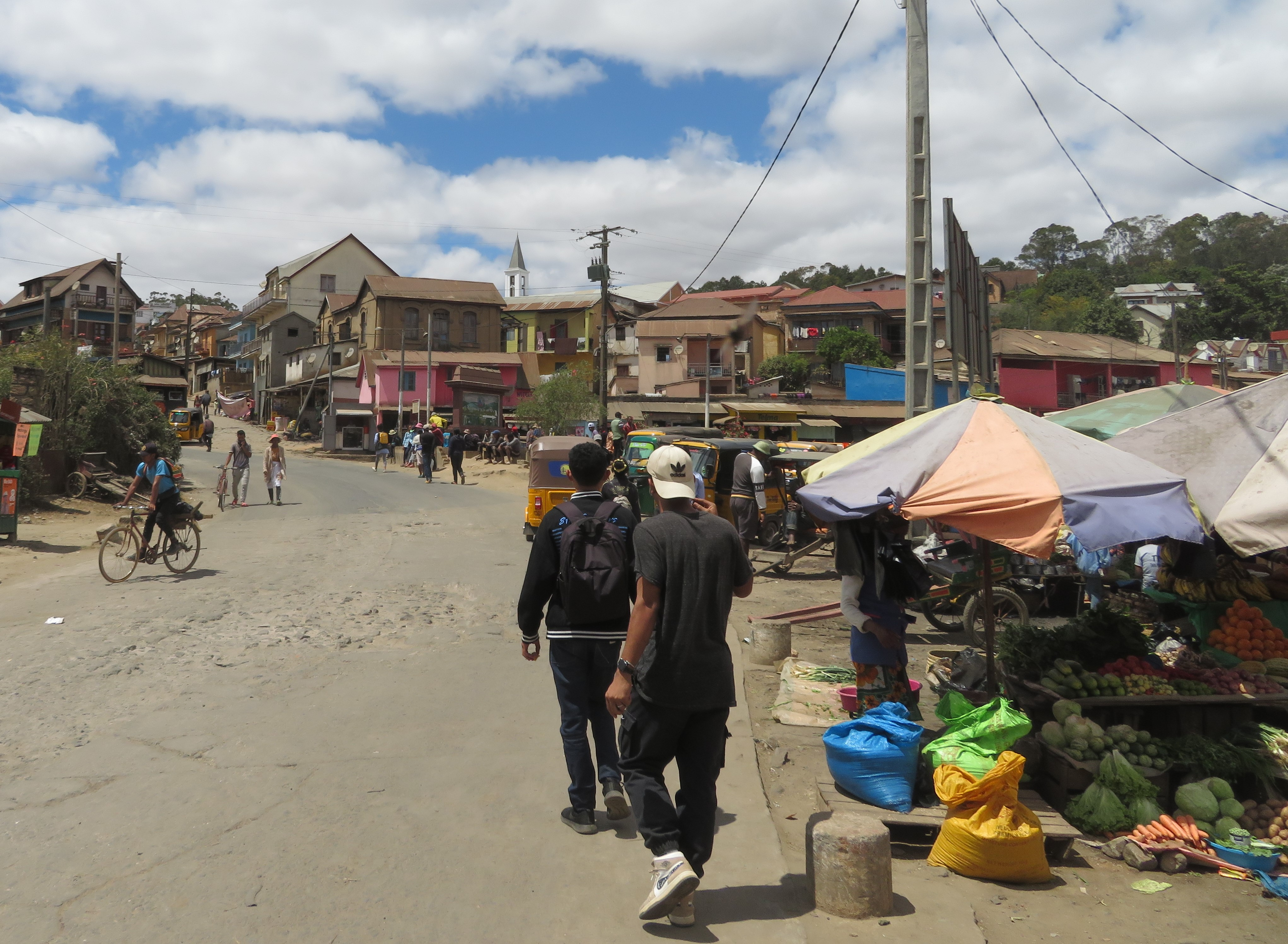
Ambatolampy Main street

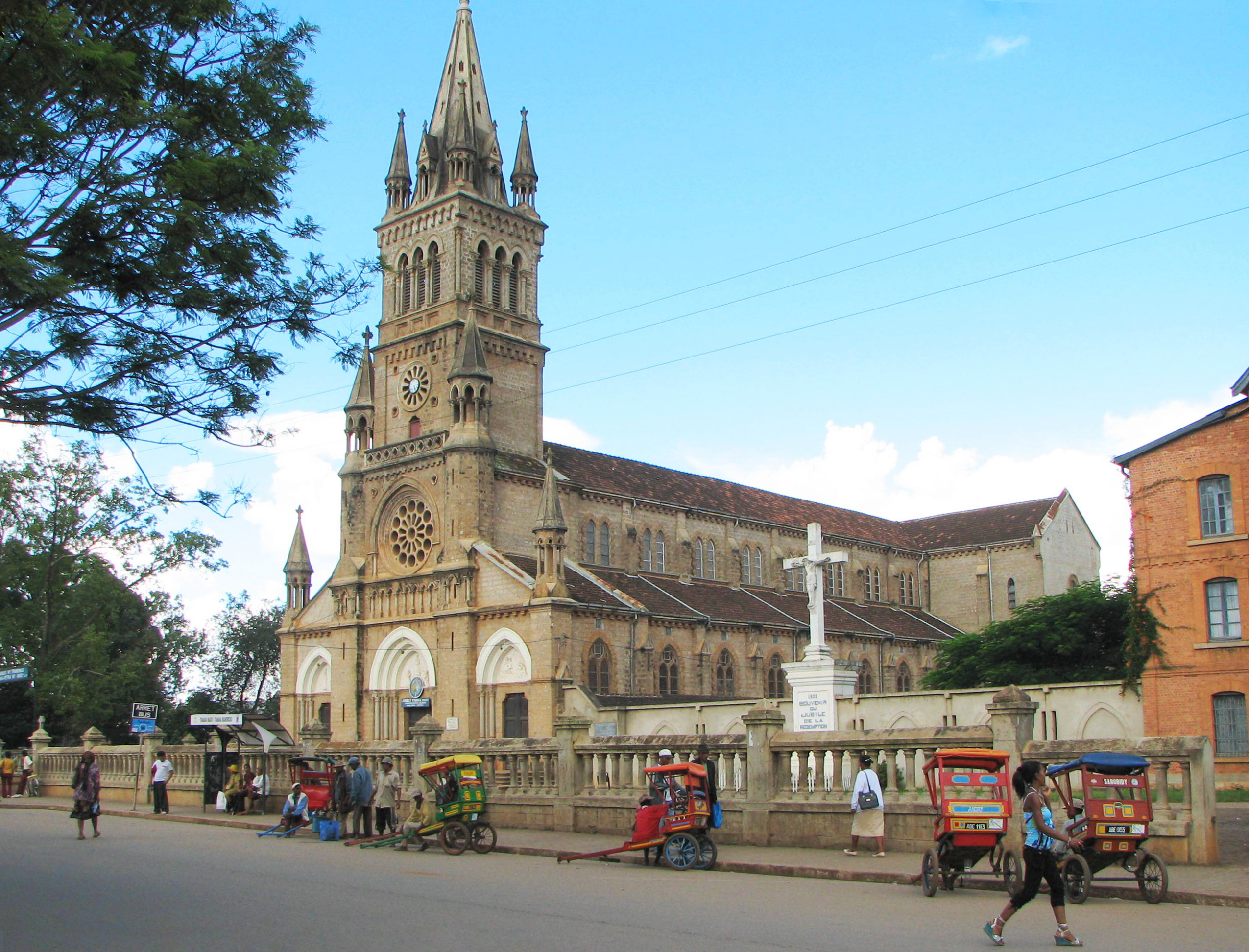
Cathedral of Antsirabe

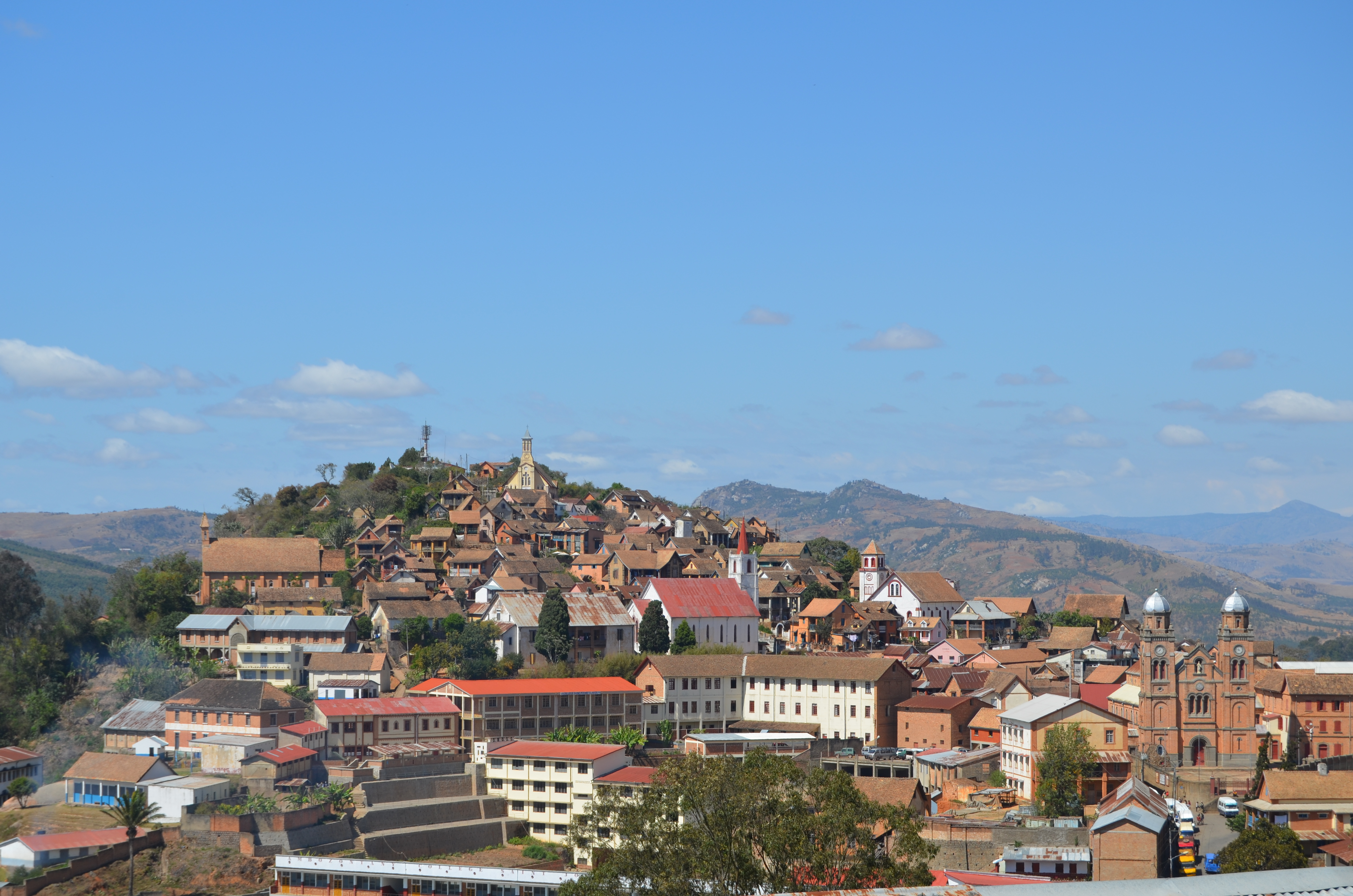
Fianarantsoa

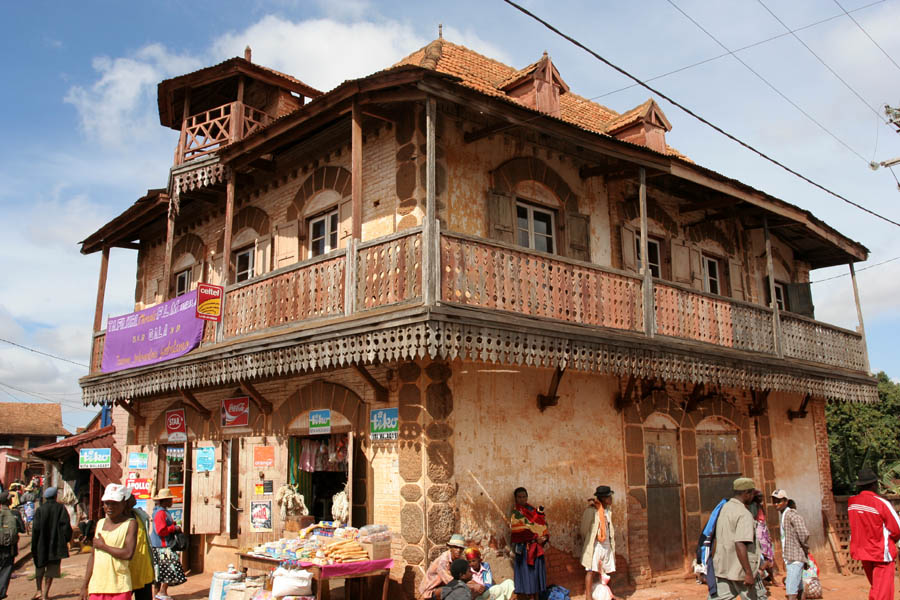
Ambalavao

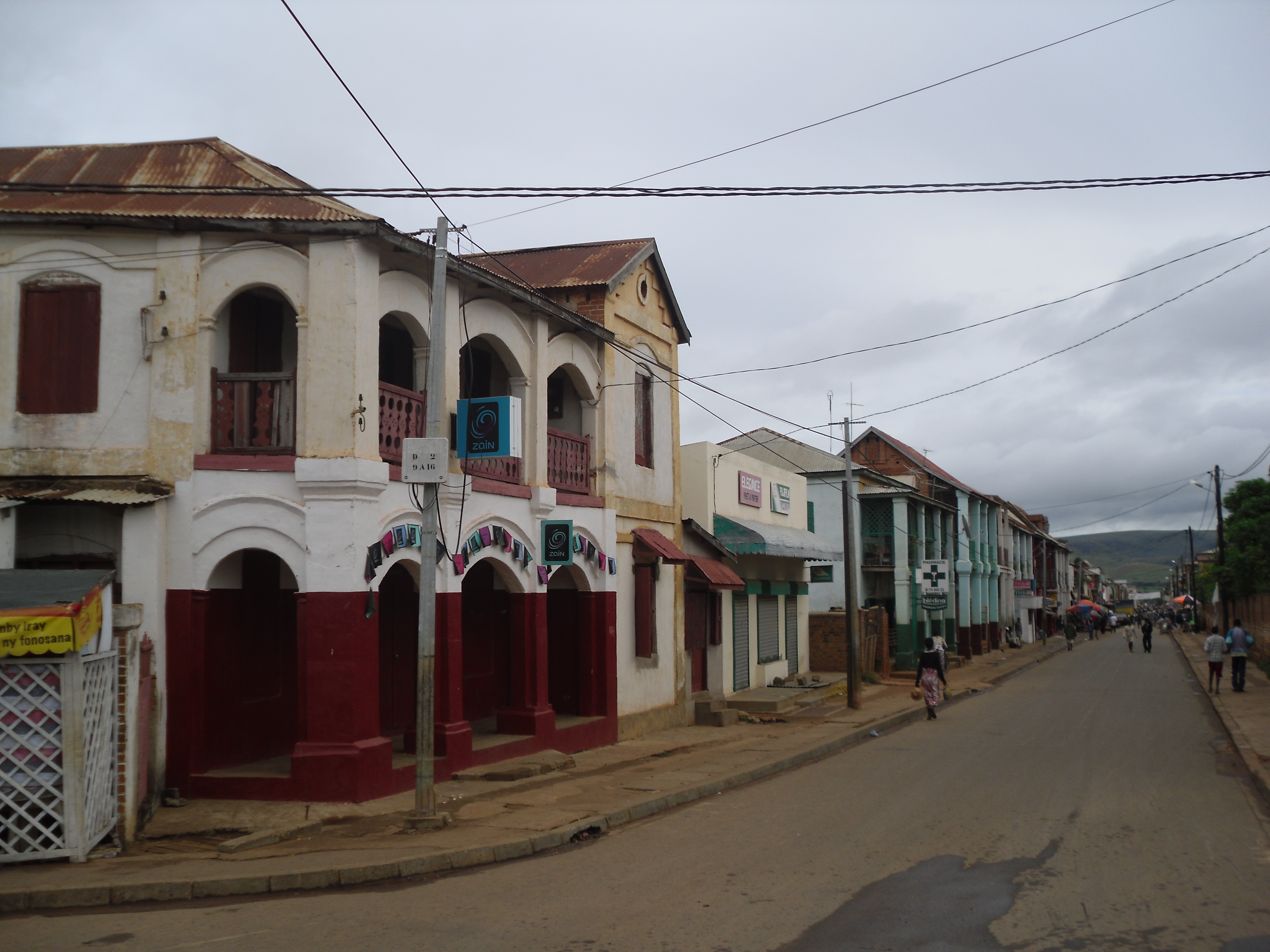
Ihosy

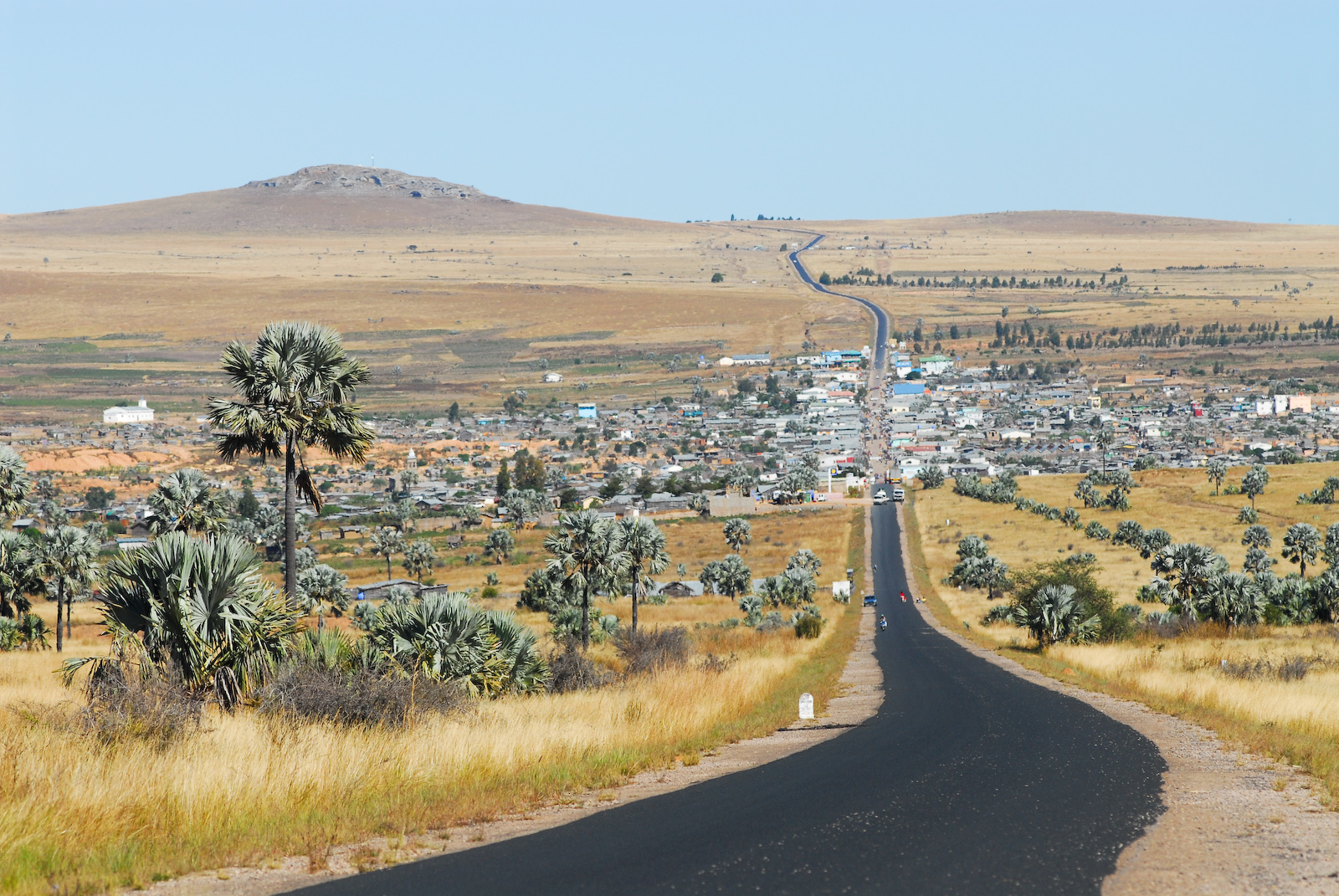
crossing Ilakaka

== See also ==
- List of roads in Madagascar
- Transport in Madagascar
