= Bara people =

Malagasy ethnic group

Bara
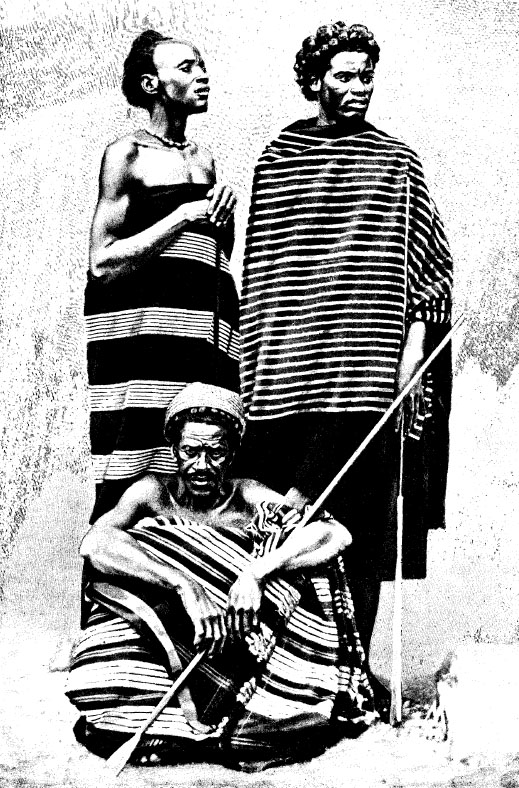
- Isambo, king of the Bara people (1906)

Total population
- c. 520,000

Regions with significant populations
- Madagascar

Languages
- Bara dialect

Related ethnic groups
- Other Malagasy groups, Bantu peoples, Austronesian peoples

The Bara people are a Malagasy ethnic group living in the southern part of the central plateaus of Madagascar, in the Toliara Province, concentrated around their historic capital at Ihosy. The Bara are the largest of the island's zebu-herding peoples and have historically lived a semi-nomadic lifestyle, although an increasing proportion are practicing agriculture. Bara society is highly patriarchal and endogamy and polygamy are practiced among some Bara tribes. Young men practice cattle rustling to prove their manhood before marriage, and the kilalaky musical and dance tradition associated with cattle rustlers has gained popularity across the island.

Historically the Bara were organized into numerous affiliated kingdoms ruled by nobles of the Zafimanely line. They were largely united under a single king in the late 18th century before again dissolving into competing kingdoms. Over the 19th century, Bara participation in slave and cattle trading and raids into neighboring territories saw their wealth and power increase despite the group's fragmented political organization. This economic power enabled the Bara to maintain independence from the expanding authority of the Kingdom of Imerina and resist French authority for nearly a decade following colonization in 1896. Andre Resampa, a powerful political leader in the transition to independence for Madagascar in 1960, hailed from the Bara ethnic group. There were an estimated 520,000 Bara in Madagascar in 2000 constituting roughly three percent of the population, and they remain the island's predominant zebu herders and traders.

== Ethnic identity ==
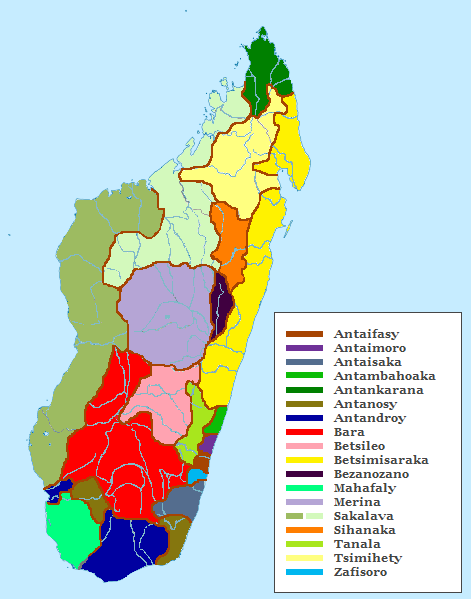
Distribution of Malagasy ethnic groups

The name Bara is of Bantu origin and means "those of the interior". Along with Sakalava and few others, Bara are one of the Malagasy ethnic groups of clear, and predominant Bantu descent. They live principally in the southern part of the central plateaus of Madagascar, in the Toliara Province, especially in the Ihosy-Betroka area. They numbered an estimated 520,000 in 2000.

== History ==
The history of the Bara begins along the Ihosy River in the Arindrano region of southwest Madagascar, near Toliara. Little is known about the earliest period in Bara identity formation, beyond that it coincided with the formation of the Maroserana dynasty of the Sakalava people and that certain Bara nobles had Maroserana origins. This early kingship-based social structure is believed to have had weak or nonexistent rules of succession. Around 1640 a noble of the Mahafaly people invaded Bara territory and installed his family as rulers under the dynastic name Zafimanely. This was an imposition to which many Bara were unwilling to submit, leading them to simply migrate internally to new territory. Zafimanely power became more firmly established after the death of the Mahafaly nobleman in 1653, but competition and ambition led these newcomers to engage in an ongoing struggle for power until around 1680, greatly disrupting life in Bara territory (Ibara). A major driver of this instability was the absence of a tribute system, leading Zafimanely nobles to engage in cattle raiding and issuing costly fines to law breakers that sparked internal and external tensions alike.

Around 1800 there emerged a Zafimanely king called Raikitroka who put in place new regulations that greatly eased these tensions and ushered in a reign of relative tranquility and harmony. After Raikitroka's death, the ruling line fractured into multiple kingdoms and principalities; by 1895 the Bara were organized into at least three major kingdoms, two mid-sized ones and more than 24 minor kingdoms. This shift was linked not to economic causes—the Bara as a whole grew richer from international trade and the raiding of Imerina in the late 19th century—but rather because of the gradual dispersal of the growing Bara population into the relatively underpopulated plains of the west and south and subsequently growing distance of the scattered population from the traditional center of Bara power. Although Queen Ranavalona I successfully established a Merina military installation at Ihosy, the 19th century military conquests of the Kingdom of Imerina never succeeded in entirely subjugating the Bara. Working from their base at Ihosy, the Merina garrison attempted to exert some degree of influence over the Bara by providing support to stronger Bara kings over their challengers in an effort to maintain friendly alliances with powerful leaders capable of exerting the control over the territory that the Merina could not. Despite the dispersed nature of Bara power, by the end of the 19th century the Zafimanely constellation of ruling nobles ranked alongside that of the Sakalava and Merina as the most powerful political forces on the island.

The Zafimanely Kingdom was dissolved after the island was colonized by the French in 1896. The king of one of the most prominent Bara kingdoms, a leader named Ramieba, was arrested by the French for leading Bara participation in the Menalamba rebellion against French rule in 1897. This consequently soured Bara perception of the French, who otherwise might have been welcomed as conquerors of the widely resented Merina sovereigns. After the French conquered Madagascar they attempted with great difficulty to impose administrative authority in Bara territory, with frequent Bara insurrections between June 1897 and the general southern uprising of 1904–05.

Bara politician Andre Resampa became a leading figure in the establishment of the Social Democratic Party (PSD) in the run-up to national independence in 1960. When PSD figurehead Philibert Tsiranana was elected Madagascar's first president on 1 May 1959, Resampa became the party's Secretary General; in this role, he spearheaded the revival of the traditional body of local government, the fokonolona, and led a successful effort to dramatically increase party membership.

== Society ==
Bara society is structured into numerous loosely affiliated groups based on common ancestors. These were clustered into five main tribes. The three largest and most powerful were the Bara-Be, Bara-Imamono and Bara-Ianstsantsa, who lived alongside the smaller Vinda and Antivondro. They live a semi-nomadic lifestyle that revolves around herding zebu and are the largest and most important of the Malagasy pastoralist groups. The capital of the Bara was located in Ihosy. Community life was traditionally organized around a rigid set of rules and norms, but these have loosened since the early 20th century as growing population pressures have forced emigration and dispersal of the Bara away from their historic homeland. Like elsewhere in Madagascar, Bara society was historically stratified into three classes: nobles, commoners and slaves.

Communities remain strongly patriarchal, and polygamy is commonly practiced. Endogamy is also practiced among some Bara tribes. The male head of the family often has a dual role as the spiritual leader of the household. Traditionally, inheritance rights strongly favored males; daughters were restricted from inheriting anything other than movable property. Gender roles were strictly defined. Men prepared the soil of the rice fields, purchased or hunted for food, gathered firewood, built the family home and furniture, and engaged in discussion and debate about public affairs. Women were responsible for growing crops for sale or family consumption, weeding the rice fields, harvesting and processing the rice, gathering water, lighting the hearth fire and preparing daily meals, and weaving. As recently as the late 19th century, women were forbidden from eating until after the men had finished, and could not look at them while they ate. At birth, a village ombiasy (seer) was typically consulted to determine whether the child was destined for a fortunate or unhappy fate. If the latter, an exorcism was practiced whereby the infant would be slid down a chute into a body of water where his mother would retrieve him, and if it was deemed that the evil destiny was too strong for the exorcism rite to overcome it, the Bara infant would be left on an anthill to die.

=== Religious affiliation ===
While some Baras are Christians, most retain their traditional religious beliefs. Tamarind trees were traditionally considered sacred and are found planted near many Bara villages, where residents will leave offerings like woven mats, locks of hair, shells and other items when offering prayers or after their requests are fulfilled. The indigenous bontona tree was also considered sacred and villagers would tie charms to the branches when offering prayers. Each village also had a hazomanga, a wooden pillar considered the most sacred site of worship, which served as the public altar for group prayer and offerings. This pillar was typically 20 to 30 feet high and a sachet containing sacred herbs, sand and wood chips was hung from the top. Bara men traditionally conduct the rites associated with honoring the ancestors, while women conduct rites associated with fertility and the forces of nature. An exception is childbirth, during which the mother is secluded for a period of four days; men watch over the birthing process and conduct associated rites.

== Culture ==
Agreements were traditionally formalized through a blood pact (fatidra). The Bara live in rectangular earthen houses that are colored red by the high iron content of the soil. In the winter, space beneath the eaves is used for hanging and sun-drying maize to be stored, sold or planted the following year.

=== Cattle ===
Demonstrating courage is fundamental to masculinity in Bara culture. Historically, kings were required to lead the advance in combat, placing themselves in danger first; the others were not allowed to protect him or come to his aid unless he was injured or exhausted. Cattle raiding is a major feature of Bara culture. Traditionally a rite of passage for young men to prove their worth and courage to a prospective wife's family and the larger community, the practice is currently outlawed but remains widespread throughout the southwest and south-central Bara territories. Young men could not expect to marry respectably without first having successfully stolen at least one or two cattle in a raid. Today, cattle rustlers (dahalo) are increasingly armed bandits stealing cattle for wealth rather than social prestige. Zebu wrestling is a sport practiced by Bara communities and involves Zebu being penned into an arena and whipped into frustration. Once the zebu is angry, players sneak up behind the Zebu and jump onto its hump, attempting to 'ride' as long as possible without being injured by the beast. It is seen as a rite of passage for young boys.

=== Oral tradition ===
The Bara have a rich oral storytelling tradition. Their myths and stories are distinguished by an especially stark and terse use of language. The comparatively simple structure and symbolism that predominates in Bara storytelling is used by some linguists and anthropologists as a starting point for analyzing the evolution and variation of oral storytelling traditions on the island. The dance traditions and sculpted artwork of the Bara are well known across the island. Their wooden statues are unique in having long eyelashes made from real hair.

=== Cotton and magic ===
Traditionally, Bara women would weave local cotton to make clothing for themselves and their family members. Cotton continues to be hand picked, ginned and woven using a high-whorl drop spindle. Raw cotton yarn is typically dipped in a softening solution before weaving; prior to softening, the yarn is called fole velo ("living yarn") and is believed to be imbued with magical powers; ombiasy (village wisemen) may tie this yarn around the wrist for protection or wrap it around the bodies of participants in circumcision ceremonies. Less commonly, clothing was made of silk (landy) produced by the local silkworm that fed off indigenous tapia trees growing in the Isalo area. Although this silk was more coarse and uneven than that produced by the Merina or Betsileo people, throughout the island it was the most prized type of silk because of its durability. In the far eastern part of Bara territory, clothing was most commonly made from beaten bark cloth or mats of harefo (Eleocharis plantagines). Women wore tube dresses made of two to three mats stitched together and tied at the shoulder or belted at the waist, often in combination with a bandeau style top of woven mahampy reeds. Men wore beaten bark cloth loincloths with jackets or tunics formed from stitched woven mats; older men's clothing included sleeves. The wearing of charms is common among the Bara, as elsewhere in Madagascar; charms called tsimokotra were historically crafted from the bones of lemurs' feet to relieve fatigue.

=== Fady ===
As elsewhere in Madagascar, social life among the Bara is strongly guided by fady, ancestral taboos that often vary by class, by village, or even by family. In some Bara villages, it is forbidden to carry a load alone; at least two people must carry it together. A common prohibition throughout Bara communities forbids serving food or drink to someone with the utensils, plates or cups that were used to serve another. It is also fady to step over someone seated or lying on the ground, lift or carry an item over another person's head or body, brush another person with one's lamba, or sit on or lean against another's bed.

Numerous fady surround the Bara nobles. Among the Zafimanely royal clan, for example, it is forbidden to ever kill a relative, even as punishment for a serious crime. Historically it was taboo to speak to the wives of chiefs or enter their houses, and there were specific locations restricted to everyone but them for gathering firewood and collecting water. A particularly strong taboo forbade speaking the name of a chief after his death or any word that formed part of the name. The deceased leader was given a new name after death that all were required to use, and specific synonyms were selected to replace the words composing his name for use in regular conversation; anyone who spoke the forbidden words would harshly punished or in some instances executed.

=== Funeral rites ===
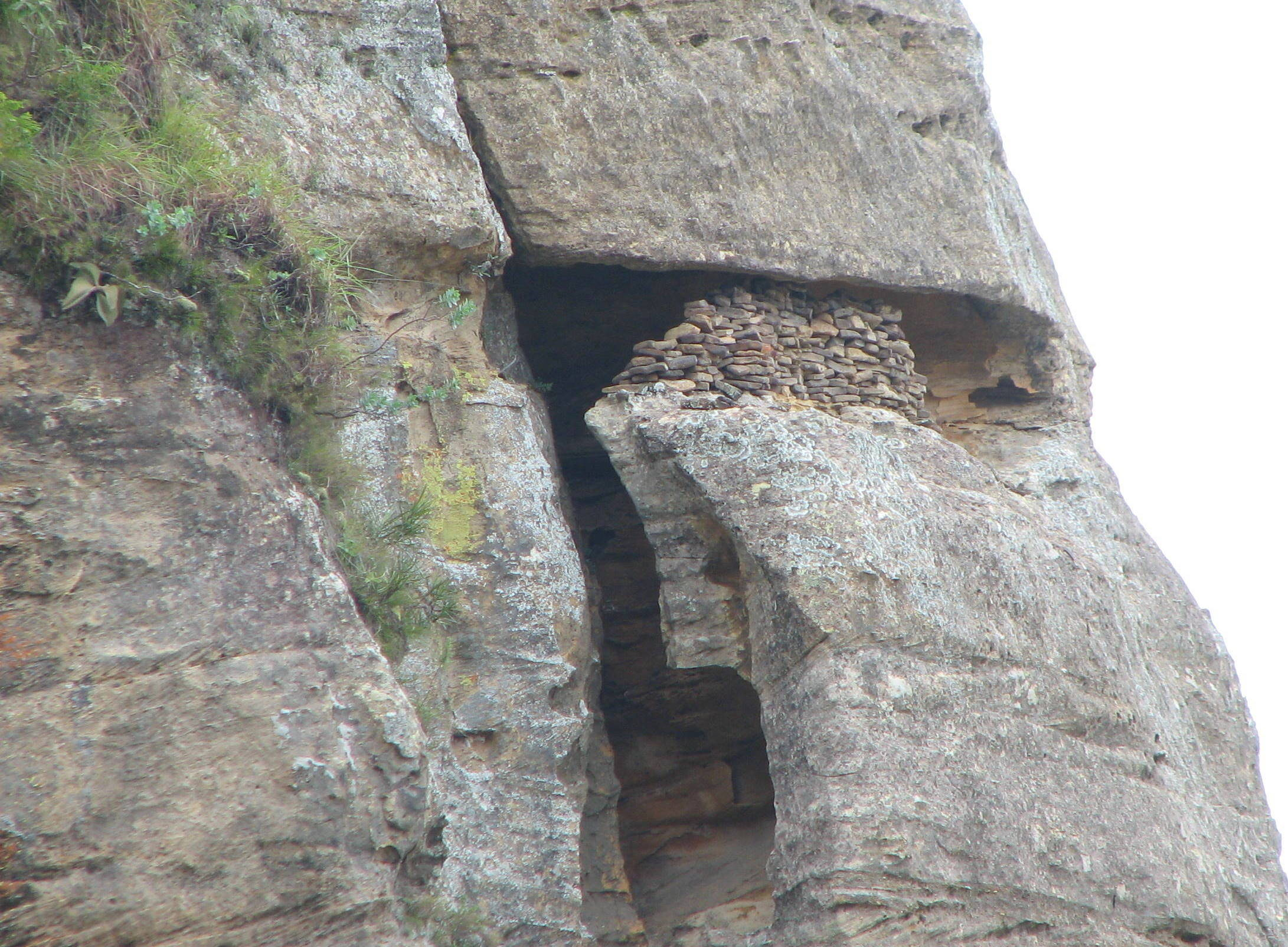
Bara burial site, Isalo national park

The Bara entomb the dead in natural mountain caves, particularly in Isalo National Park, an area they consider sacred; they have buried their dead in the caves here for centuries. Where such natural formations are not available, the Bara build tombs covered in stones at a site away from the village. Mourners visit the bereaved in a special building called the "house of many tears" where the women engage in ritual wailing and expression of sorrow. The bereaved family members cut their hair to express mourning. Among many Bara, wives were not buried with their husband and his children, but were rather buried with their father or in a separate site. It is believed that the spirits of the dead linger as ghosts, which historically prompted villages to relocate after a death.

Those associated with a recent death are seen as imbued with a kind of contagion for a short period of time. When bilo or salamanga healing rituals are being conducted, the ombiasy may erect a special barrier (kiady) in front of the entrance to the house where the ceremony is being held as an indicator that anyone whose family member has recently died (as well as any foreigner or stranger outside the community) is forbidden to enter for concern about breaking the power of the healing spell.

=== Dance and music ===
Dance among the Bara is influenced by the movement of the zebu they have traditionally herded for centuries. The karitaky dance in particular is a movement inspired by a zebu kicking. The most popular contemporary dance, called kilalaky, is performed in a line and originated among Bara cattle rustlers. The specific style of musical accompaniment, also known as kilalaky, is performed on djembe, kabosy, electric guitar, bass guitar, drum kit and keyboard. Bagzana and Tsiliva are considered among the most popular performers of kilalaky. The most typical musical instrument among the Bara is the lokanga, a fiddle with three strings made of goat gut or vegetable fiber.

== Language ==
The Bara speak Bara Malagasy, a dialect of the Malagasy language, which is a branch of the Malayo-Polynesian language group derived from the Barito languages, spoken in southern Borneo.

== Economy ==
Raising and selling herds of zebu is the principal economic activity of the Bara. In recent decades they have increasingly adopted agricultural practices, including the cultivation of rice, cassava, millet and maize. The rice planting season was traditionally timed around the arrival of a local migrating quail (Coturnix communis), known locally as kibodolo. The Bara and Sakalava were Madagascar's principal international slave traders through the early part of the 19th century. Historically the majority of slave raids were conducted in the dry winter months. Beginning in the 1870s, in response to increased cattle demand in South Africa following a series of blights and disease that had decimated local herds, the Bara began exporting their cattle internationally through southern coastal ports including Toliara, Saint Augustin, Belo and Soalara. The development of economic activity independent of the regulation of the Merina Kingdom, as well as the arms they received in exchange for cattle, enabled the Bara to strengthen their autonomy and resist Merina authority in the later 19th century, even to the extent of launching cattle and slave raids into the heart of Imerina - an activity that increased particularly after 1882. The Ankandrarezina Bara also cultivated tapia (Uapaca bojeri), a tree upon which the indigenous silkworm fed; the silk they produced was both woven locally for cloth and exported in raw form to Imerina.

== Bibliography ==
- Appiah, Anthony; Gates, Henry Louis (2010). Encyclopedia of Africa, Volume 2. Oxford, UK: Oxford University Press. ISBN 978-0-19-533770-9.
- Bradt, Hilary; Austin, Daniel (2007). Madagascar (9th ed.). Guilford, CT: The Globe Pequot Press Inc. ISBN 978-1-84162-197-5.
- Campbell, Gwyn (2005). An economic history of Imperial Madagascar, 1750–1895: the rise and fall of an island empire. London: Cambridge University Press. ISBN 0-521-83935-1.
- Condra, Jill (2013). Encyclopedia of National Dress: Traditional Clothing Around the World. Los Angeles: ABC Clio. ISBN 978-0-313-37637-5.
- Ellis, Stephen (2014). The Rising of the Red Shawls. Cambridge, MA: Cambridge University Press. ISBN 978-1-107-63489-3.
- Fuhr, Jenny (2013). Experiencing Rhythm: Contemporary Malagasy Music and Identity. Cambridge, UK: Cambridge Scholars Publishing. ISBN 978-1-4438-6431-2.
- Gennep, A.V. (1904). Tabou Et Totémisme à Madagascar (in French). Paris: Ernest Leroux. ISBN 978-5-87839-721-6.
- Haring, Lee (2007). Stars and Keys: Folktales and Creolization in the Indian Ocean. Bloomington, IN: Indiana University Press. ISBN 978-0-253-00000-2.
- Michel, Louis (1957). Mœurs et coutumes des Bara (in French). Tananarive: Imprimerie Officielle.
- Ogot, Bethwell A. (1992). Africa from the Sixteenth to the Eighteenth Century. Paris: UNESCO. ISBN 978-92-3-101711-7.
- Ottino, Paul (1998). Les champs de l'ancestralité à Madagascar: parenté, alliance et patrimoine (in French). Paris: Karthala Editions. ISBN 978-2-86537-776-3.
- Scheff, Thomas (1979). Catharsis in Healing, Ritual, and Drama. Berkeley, CA: University of California Press. ISBN 978-0-520-04125-7.
- Thompson, Virginia; Adloff, Richard (1965). The Malagasy Republic: Madagascar Today. San Francisco, CA: Stanford University Press. ISBN 978-0-8047-0279-9.
- Vig, Lars (2001). Les conceptions religieuses des anciens Malgaches (in French). Paris: Karthala Editions. ISBN 978-2-84586-181-7.
