= Ihosy =

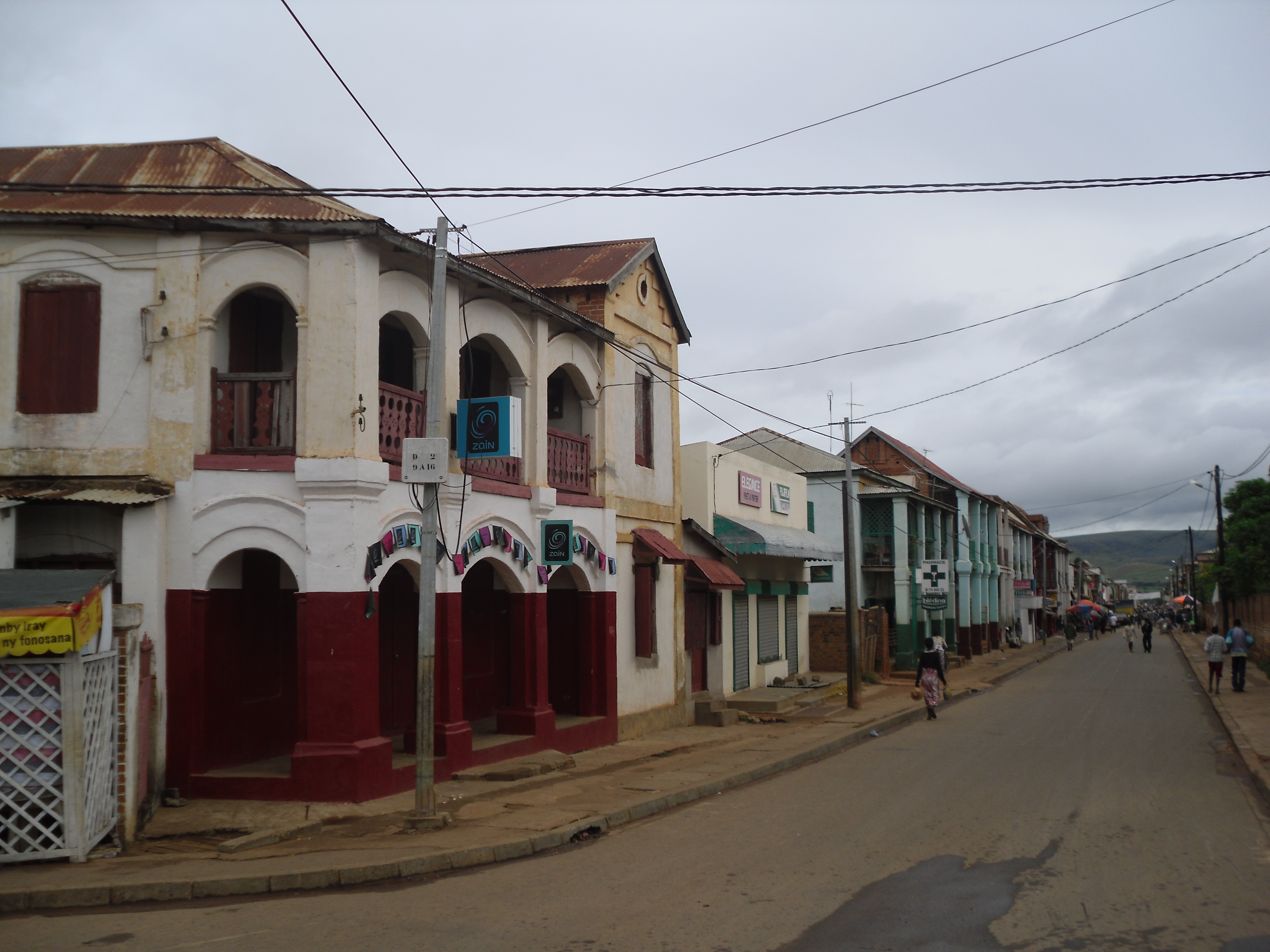
- Downtown Ihosy

- Location in Madagascar
- Coordinates: 22°24′13″S 46°07′33″E
- Country: Madagascar
- Region: Ihorombe
- District: Ihosy

Area
  - Total: 30.1 km^{2} (11.6 sq mi)
- Elevation: 800 m (2,600 ft)

Population (2018 census)
  - Total: 39,556
  - Density: 1,310/km^{2} (3,400/sq mi)
- Postal code: 313

Ihosy [iˈuɕ] is a city (commune urbaine) with 39,556 inhabitants (2018) in Ihorombe Region in central south Madagascar.

Ihosy is the capital of Ihorombe Region, as well as of the district of Ihosy.

== Geography ==
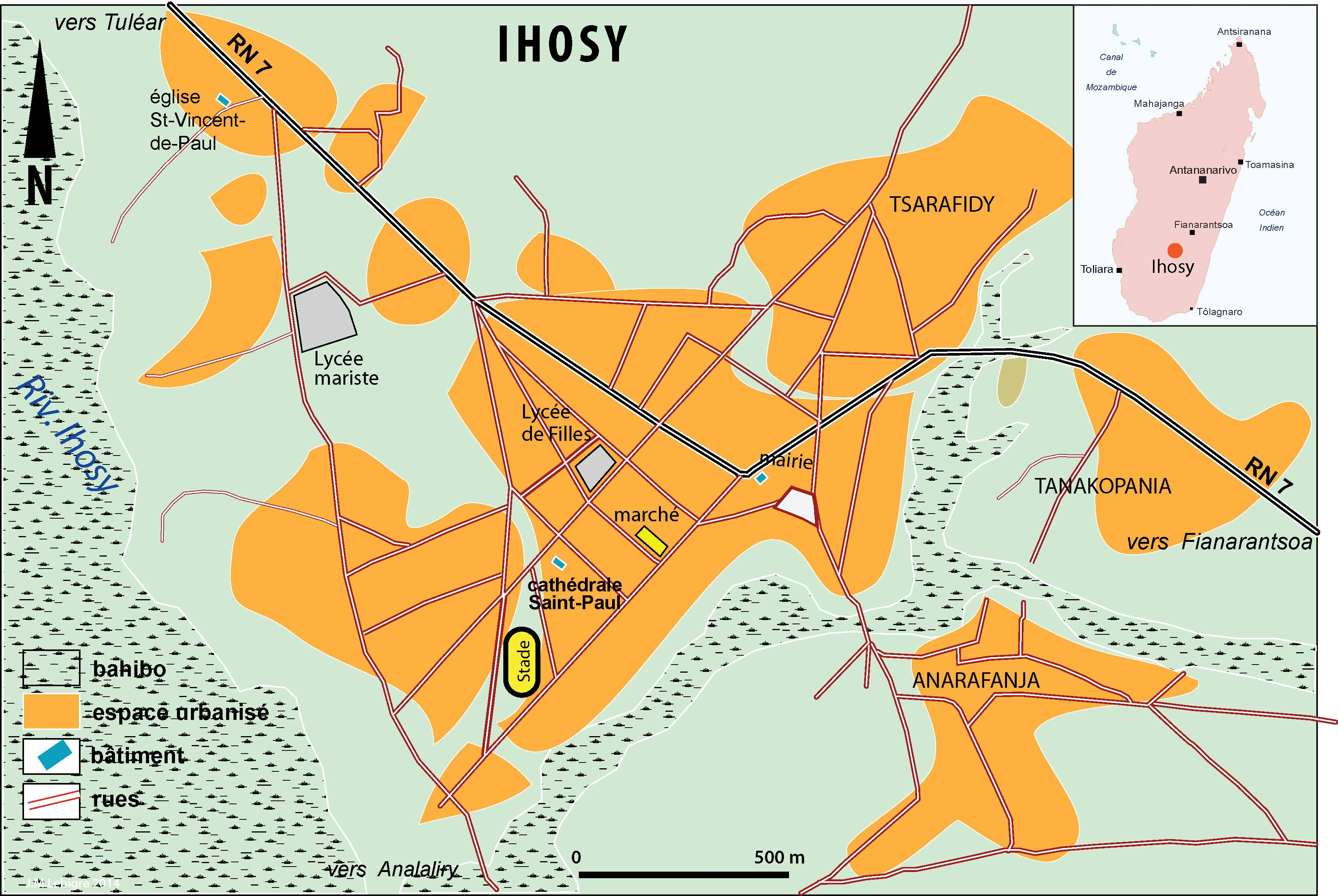
Ihosy

Ihosy is an important crosspoint for the southern part of Madagascar. It is crossed by the Route nationale 7 from the capital Antananarivo (600 km) (-Fianarantsoa (191 km) to Toliara (325 km) and startpoint of the Route nationale 13 to Tolagnaro and Route nationale 27 to Farafangana (271 km). It is located on the Ihosy River and has a regional airport: Ihosy Airport.

== Religion ==
- Roman Catholic Diocese of Ihosy seated in the cathedral of St. Vincent de Paul.
- FJKM - Fiangonan'i Jesoa Kristy eto Madagasikara (Church of Jesus Christ in Madagascar)
- FLM - Fiangonana Loterana Malagasy (Malagasy Lutheran Church)
- EEM Eklesia Episkopaly Malagasy (Anglican Church of Madagascar)

== Points of interest ==
- The Isalo National Park is located near Ihosy and Ranohira in a distance of 80 km by the Route nationale 7 .
- The caves of Andranomilitry, 10 km from the city in direction of Toliara
- Pic d'Ivohibe Reserve - (110 km)

== Roads ==
- National road 7 - from Fianarantsoa to Toliara.
- National road 13 - from Ihosy to Fort Dauphin
- National road 27 - from Ihosy to Farafangana (272 km, unpaved)

== Energy ==
Ihorombe has only one power station: a hydroelectric plant of 700 kv that serves the cities of Ambia, Ankily, Ihosy and Sahambano.
