= Ihorombe =

Coordinates: 22°24′00″S 46°07′48″E

Ihorombe Region
- Region
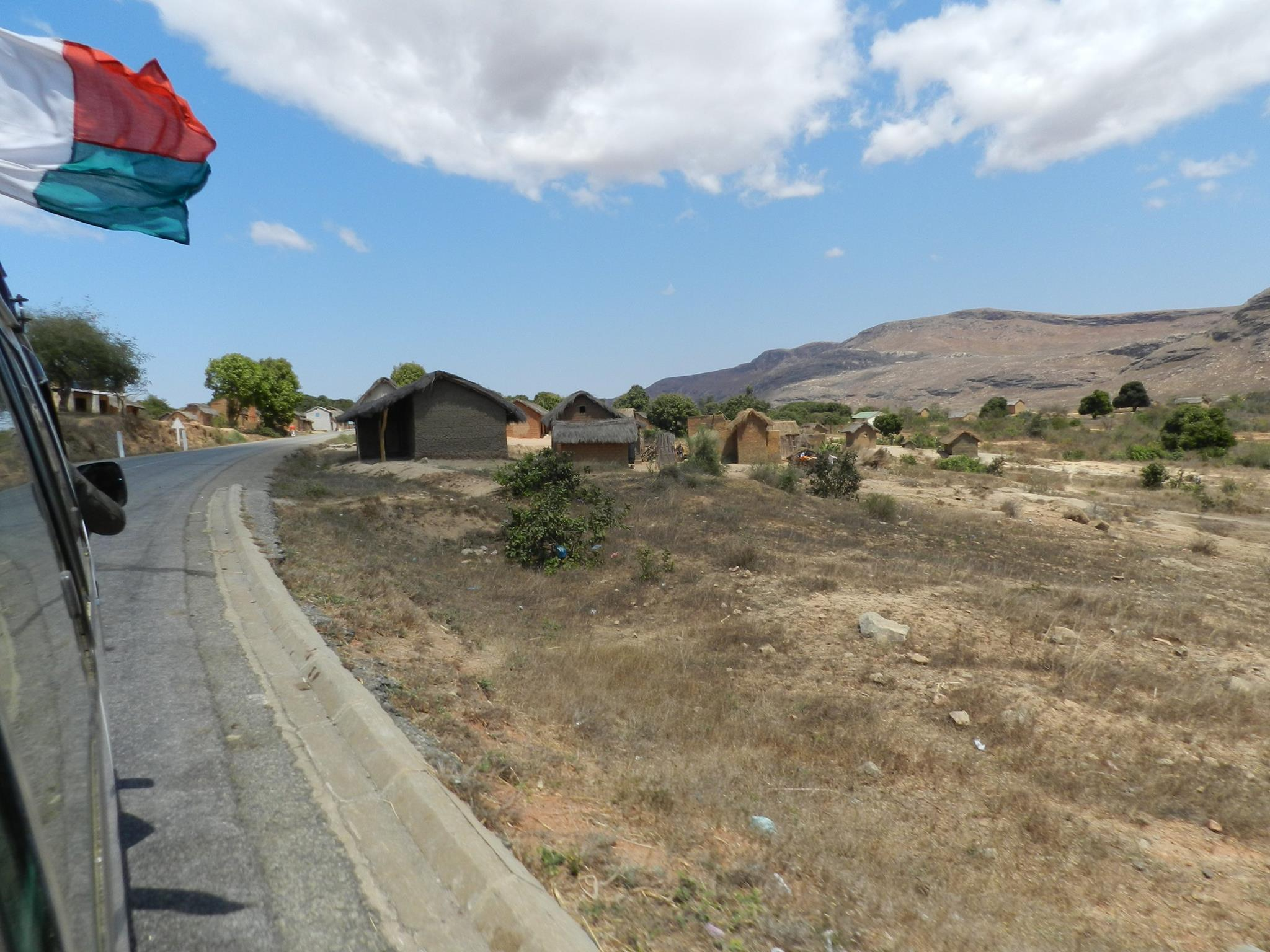
- National road 7 near Ihosy

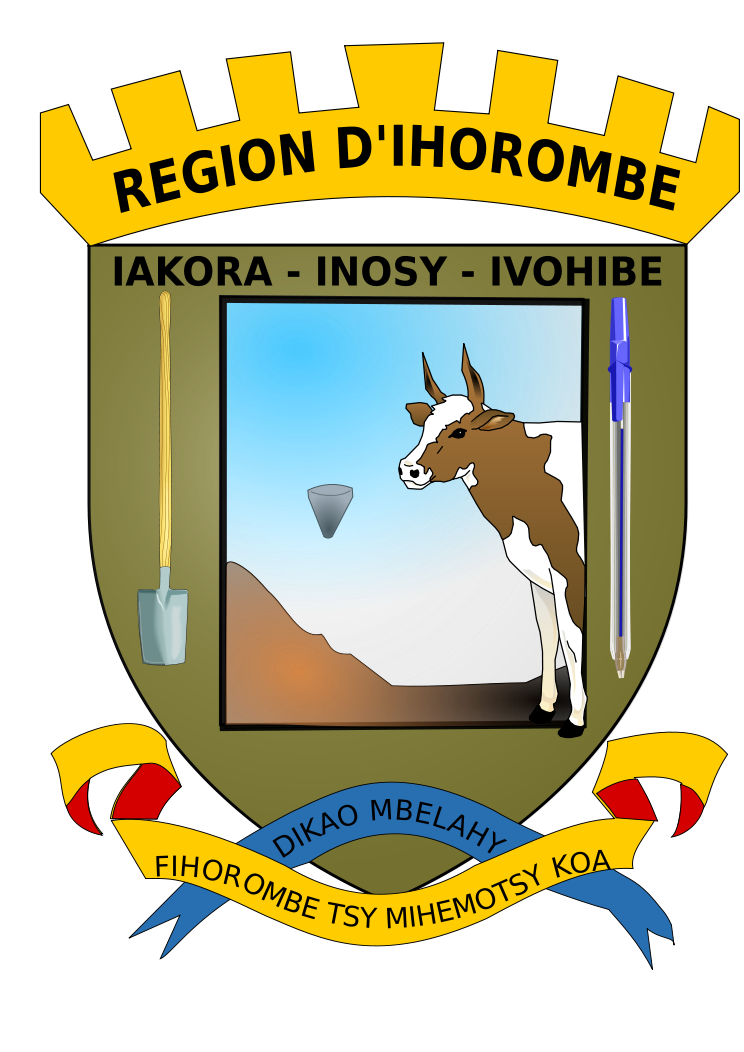
- Seal

- Location in Madagascar
- Country: Madagascar
- Capital: Ihosy

Government
  - Type: Governor
  - Governor: Sareine Tafita Nomenjanahary

Area
  - Total: 26,391 km^{2} (10,190 sq mi)

Population (2018)
  - Total: 418,520
  - Density: 15.858/km^{2} (41.073/sq mi)
  - Ethnicities: Bara 80% + few Betsileo Antaisaka Merina Antandroy Antemoro Antefasy
- Time zone: UTC3 (EAT)
- HDI (2018): 0.446 low · 18th of 22

Ihorombe is a region in Madagascar. It borders the Haute Matsiatra region to the north, the Atsimo-Atsinanana region to the east, the Anosy region to the south, and the Atsimo-Andrefana region to the west. The capital is Ihosy and the population was 418,520 in 2018. The area of Ihorombe is 26,391 km^{2} (10,190 sq mi) and it has one of the lowest population densities of the Malagasy regions.

== Sports ==
- FC Ihosy (football)

== Administrative divisions ==
The Ihorombe Region is divided into three districts, which are subdivided into 31 communes.

- Iakora District - 5 communes
- Ihosy District - 20 communes
- Ivohibe District - 6 communes

== Energy ==
Ihorombe has only one power station: a hydroelectric plant that serves the cities of Ambia, Ankily, Ihosy and Sahambano.

== Transport ==
=== Airport ===
- Ihosy Airport

== Protected Areas ==
- Part of Fandriana-Vondrozo Corridor
- Isalo National Park
- Part of Kalambatritra Reserve
- Pic d'Ivohibe Reserve
