= Jean (male given name) =

- Pronunciation: English: /ʒɒ̃, ʒɔːn/ zhon, zhawn French: [ʒɑ̃]

Origin
- Origin: Hebrew, via Old French
- Meaning: "Yahweh is gracious"

Other names
- Related names: John, Jahan, Evan, Giovanni, Hans, Juan, Hovhannes, Ian, Ioan, Ioane, Ivan, Iven, Ifan, Jack, Jackson, Jan, Jane, Janez, Jhon, Joan, João, Johan/Johann, Johanan, Johannes, Jonne, Jovan, Jared, Juhani, Seán, Shane, Siôn, Yahya, Yohannes

In many French-speaking countries, Jean is a male given name derived from the Old French Jehan (or Jahan). The female equivalent is Jeanne (French: [ʒan]) and derives from the Old French Jehanne. Both names derive from the Latin name Johannes, itself from the Koine Greek name Ioannes (Ἰωάννης), the name used for various New Testament characters in French, such as John the Baptist. The Greek name ultimately derives from the Biblical Hebrew name Yohanan (יוֹחָנָן), meaning "YHWH/Yahweh is Gracious".

== People known only as Jean ==
- Jean, Count of Harcourt (died 1473)
- Jean, Baron de Batz (1754–1822)
- Jean, duc Decazes (1864–1912)
- Jean, Grand Duke of Luxembourg (1921–2019), ruled Luxembourg, 1964–2000
- Prince Jean of Luxembourg (born 1957)
- DJ Jean (born 1968), Jan Engelaar, a Dutch disc jockey
- Jean (footballer, born 1972), Jean Paulo Fernandes, Brazilian goalkeeper
- Jean (footballer, born 1979), Jean Ferreira Narde, Brazilian defender
- Jean (footballer, born 1981), Jean Paulo Batista de França, Brazilian defender
- Jean (footballer, born 1982), Jean Carlos da Silva Ferreira, Brazilian striker
- Jean (footballer, born 1986), Jean Raphael Vanderlei Moreira, Brazilian defender and midfielder
- Jean (footballer, born 1994), Jean Carlos de Souza Irmer, Brazilian midfielder
- Jean (footballer, born June 1995), Jean Carlos de Brito, Brazilian defender
- Jean (footballer, born October 1995), Jean Paulo Fernandes Filho, Brazilian goalkeeper

== Jean as a male given name ==
- Jean Absil (1893–1974), Belgian composer
- Jean Agélou (1878–1921), French photographer
- Jean Alesi (born 1964), French racing driver
- Jean Baudrillard (1929–2007), French sociologist and philosopher
- Jean Brankart (1930–2020), Belgian cyclist
- Jean Bricmont (born 1952), Belgian theoretical physicist and philosopher of science
- Jean Chera (born 1995), Brazilian footballer
- Jean Chrétien (born 1934), Canadian politician
- Jean Vincent de Crozals (1922–2009), French painter, sculptor
- Jean Deretti (born 1993), Brazilian footballer
- Jean Desessard (born 1952), French politician
- Jean Drosny (born 1994), Brazilian footballer
- Jean Erasmus (born 1991), Namibian tennis player
- Jean Filion (born 1951), Canadian politician
- Jean Gabin (1904–1976), French actor
- Jean Paul Getty (1892–1976), American-born British petrol-industrialist
- Jean-Paul Sartre (1905-1980), French author and existentialist philosopher
- Jean Hersholt (1886–1956), Danish-American actor
- Jean Houde (born 1939), French sprint canoeist
- Jean Kahwaji (born 1953), Lebanese army general
- Jean Laborie (1919–1996), French bishop
- Jean López (born 1973), American taekwondo athlete and coach
- Jean Maciel (born 1989), Brazilian footballer
- Jean Mannheim (1863–1945), German-born American painter and educator
- Jean Marconi (1906–1971), French actor
- Jean Miguères (1940–1992), French ufologist
- Jean Moulin (1899–1943), member of the French Resistance during World War II
- Jean Njeim (1915–1971), Lebanese army general
- Jean Obeid (1939–2021), Lebanese politician
- Jean Orry (1652–1719), French economist
- Jean Pellerin, Canadian politician from Quebec
- Jean Piaget (1896–1980), Swiss psychologist and epistemologist
- Jean Chrysostome Randimbisoa (born 1954), Malagasy politician
- Jean Reno (born 1948), French actor
- Jean Rolt (born 1981), Brazilian footballer
- Jean Séguy (1925–2007), French sociologist of religion
- Jean Shepherd (1921–1999), American entertainer
- Jean Sibelius (1892–1952), Finnish composer
- Jean Tassy, Haitian soccer player and coach
- Jean Todt (born 1946), French motorsports executive and driver
- Jean Varraud (1919–2006), French footballer and scout
- Jean-Éric Vergne (born 1990), French racing driver
- Jean Vignaud (1875–1962), French writer
- Jean Vuarnet (1933–2017), French alpine skier
- Jean Ziegler (1934–2026), Swiss academic, advisor, sociologist, author and politician

== Fictional characters ==
- Jean Pierre Polnareff, supporting character in Jojo’s Bizarre Adventure: Stardust Crusaders
- Jean Valjean, protagonist of the Victor Hugo novel Les Misérables

== Songs about Jean ==
- Jean the Birdman by David Sylvian and Robert Fripp from the album The First Day

== See also ==
- Articles beginning with Jean
- Jean (female given name)
- Jean-André
- Jean-Antoine
- Jean-Baptiste
- Jean-Bernard
- Jean-Charles
- Jean-Christophe (given name)
- Jean-Claude (given name)
- Jean-Denis
- Jean-Étienne
- Jean-François
- Jean-Henri
- Jean-Jacques
- Jean-Louis
- Jean-Luc
- Jean-Marc
- Jean-Marie
- Jean-Martin
- Jean-Michel
- Jean-Pascal
- Jean-Paul (disambiguation)
- Jean-Philippe (given name)
- Jean-Pierre (given name)
- Jean-René
- Jean-Sébastien
- Jean-Yves
