= Jean-Marc =

Jean-Marc is a French masculine given name. It may refer to:

- Jean-Marc Adjovi-Bocco (born 1963), Beninese former football player
- Jean-Marc Ayrault (born 1950), French politician
- Jean-Marc Barr (born 1960), French-American film actor and director
- Jean-Marc Berliere, French historian
- Jean-Marc Bosman (born 1964), Belgian former footballer
- Jean-Marc Bustamante (born 1952), French artist, sculptor and photographer
- Jean-Marc Carisse, Canadian photographer
- Jean-Marc Chanelet (born 1968), French former football player
- Jean-Marc Cerrone (born 1952), French disco drummer and singer-songwriter
- Jean-Marc Coicaud, director of the United Nations University Office at the United Nations in New York
- Jean-Marc Dalpé (born 1957), Canadian playwright and poet
- Jean-Marc Degraeve (born 1971), French chess Grandmaster
- Jean Marc Ela (1936–2008), sociologist, diocesan priest, professor and author
- Jean-Marc Ferratge (born 1959), French retired footballer
- Jean-Marc Ferreri (born 1962), French former footballer
- Jean-Marc Ferry (born 1946), French philosopher
- Jean-Marc Fontaine (1944–2019), French mathematician
- Jean-Marc Fournier (born 1959), Quebec politician and lawyer
- Jean-Marc Furlan (born 1957), French football manager
- Jean-Marc Gabaude (1928–2020), French philosopher and professor
- Jean-Marc Gaillard (born 1980), French cross-country skier
- Jean-Marc Gaulin (born 1962), retired National Hockey League player
- Jean-Marc Généreux, ballroom dance champion and choreographer
- Jean-Marc Gibeau, Canadian politician
- Jean-Marc Gounon (born 1963), French racing driver
- Jean-Marc Guillou (born 1945), French ex-footballer and current trainer
- Jean-Marc Jacob (born 1947), Canadian politician
- Jean-Marc Jézéquel, French computer scientist
- Jean-Marc Juilhard (1940–2023), French politician and member of the Senate of France
- Jean Marc Gaspard Itard (1774–1838), French physician
- Jean-Marc Hamel (1925–2024), Canadian Chief Electoral Officer from 1966 to 1990
- Jean-Marc Ithier (born 1965), Mauritian former football player
- Jean-Marc de La Sablière (born 1946), Ambassador of France in Italy since 2007
- Jean-Marc Lalonde (born 1935), Canadian politician
- Jean-Marc Lanthier (ice hockey) (born 1963), Canadian ice hockey player
- Jean-Marc Lanthier (Canadian Army officer), Canadian Army officer
- Jean-Marc Leclercq, French singer and Esperantist
- Jean-Marc Lederman, Belgian keyboard player and producer
- Jean-Marc Lefranc (born 1947), French politician and member of the National Assembly of France
- Jean-Marc Lévy-Leblond (born 1940), French physicist and essayist
- Jean-Marc Ligny (born 1956), French science fiction writer
- Jean-Marc Lofficier (born 1954), French author of books about films and television programs
- Jean-Marc Loubier, Chief Executive Officer of Escada, an international luxury fashion group
- Jean-Marc Luisada (born 1958), French pianist
- Jean-Marc Marino (born 1983), French road bicycle racer
- Jean-Marc Monnerville (born 1956), French musician better known as Kali
- Jean-Marc Morandini (born 1965), French journalist
- Jean-Marc Moret (born 1942), Swiss archaeologist and art historian
- Jean-Marc Mormeck (born 1972), French boxer of Antillean descent
- Jean-Marc Nattier (1685–1766), French painter
- Jean-Marc Nesme (born 1943), French politician and member of the National Assembly of France
- Jean-Marc Nobilo (born 1960), French football coach and former player
- Jean-Marc Oroque (born 1983), French footballer
- Jean-Marc Pastor (born 1950), French politician and member of the Senate of France
- Jean-Marc Pelletier (born 1978), American ice hockey goaltender
- Jean-Marc Perraud, French business executive
- Jean-Marc Perret (born 1975), British actor
- Jean-Marc Pilorget (born 1958), French former football player
- Jean-Marc Prouveur (born 1956), French artist and filmmaker
- Jean-Marc Reiser (1941–1983), French comics creator
- Jean-Marc Robitaille (born 1955), Canadian politician and member of the House of Commons
- Jean-Marc Rochette (born 1956), French painter, illustrator and comics creator
- Jean-Marc Roubaud (born 1951), French politician and member of the National Assembly of France
- Jean-Marc Rouillan, leader of the Action directe terrorist group
- Jean-Marc Routhier (born 1968), Canadian retired ice hockey player
- Jean-Marc Sauvé (born 1949), vice-president of the France Council of State
- Jean-Marc Schaer (born 1953), French retired footballer
- Jean-Marc Tailhardat (born 1966), French retired pole vaulter
- Jean-Marc Tellier (born 1969), French politician
- Jean-Marc Todeschini (born 1952), French politician and member of the Senate of France
- Jean-Marc Vallée (born 1963), Canadian film director and screenwriter from Quebec
- Jean-Marc Varaut (1933–2005), French lawyer
