= Crisostomo =

Crisostomo or Crisóstomo (meaning "golden mouth" in Greek) is a given name and a surname. Notable people with the name include:

- Crisostomo Arameo (died 1605), Roman Catholic prelate who served as Bishop of Ston (1585–1605)
- Crisóstomo Henríquez (1594–1632), Spanish Cistercian monk and scholar of church history who worked in the Spanish Netherlands
- Crisostomo Ibarra, fictional protagonist in the novel Noli Me Tángere by José Rizal
- Crisóstomo Martinez (1638–1694), Valencian painter and engraver known for his atlas of anatomy
- Crisostomo Yalung (born 1953), former Roman Catholic Bishop from the Philippines
- Juan Crisóstomo Arriaga (1806–1826), Spanish Basque composer
- Juan Crisóstomo Bonilla (1835–1884), Mexican general
- Juan Crisóstomo Centurión (1840–1902), Paraguayan military officer
- Juan Crisóstomo Falcón (1820–1870), President of Venezuela (1863–1868)
- Juan Crisóstomo Nieto, Chachapoyas judge who brought the fortress of Kuélap to the attention of the world in the 1840s
- Juan Crisóstomo Torrico (1808–1875), President of Peru for a brief period in 1842
- João Crisóstomo de Abreu e Sousa (1811–1895), army general and Prime Minister of Portugal (1890–1892)
- João Crisóstomo de Amorim Pessoa (1810–1888), Portuguese bishop, Bishop of Santiago de Cabo Verde and archbishops of Goa and Braga
- Fely Crisóstomo, Filipina film director and actress
- Vanderson Gomes Crisóstomo (born 1986), Brazilian footballer
- Vincent Crisostomo (born 1961), American HIV/AIDS activist of Chamorro descent from Guam
- Cristopher Crisostomo (born 1994), professional baseball player for the Chiba Lotte Marines

== See also ==
- Ribeirão Crisóstomo, river of Mato Grosso state in western Brazil
- San Giovanni Crisostomo, church in Cannaregio, Venice
- Teatro San Giovanni Crisostomo, opera house in Venice
- Juan Crisóstomo Falcón National Park, also known as the Sierra de San Luis, in Falcón state, Venezuela
- Chrysostome (disambiguation)
- Chrysostomos (disambiguation)
- Chrysostomus (disambiguation)
