= Georges Ratalata =

Malagasy politician

Georges Ratalata is a Malagasy politician. A member of the National Assembly of Madagascar, he was elected as a member of the Tiako I Madagasikara party; he represents the constituency of Ambalavao.

He was named senator in 2016 for the HVM (HVM - Hery Vaovao Hoan'i Madagasikara).

In 2016 he visited the Malagasy Anti-Corruptional Bureau (Bianco), supposedly to apply pressure on the office. He appeared there after an investigation into alleged misuse of a 396 million ariary subsidy.
