= Zannini (disambiguation) =

Zannini are a tribe of Fulgoromorphan insects.

Zannini may also refer to:

- Alain Zannini (born 1958), French writer, painter and jazz guitarist
- Carlos Zannini (born 1954), Argentine lawyer and politician
