= Dorsainvil =

Dorsainvil is a surname. Notable people with the surname include:

- Frantz Dorsainvil (born 1991), Haitian swimmer
- Justin Chrysostome Dorsainvil (1880–1942), Haitian author and educator
- Monique Dorsainvil (born 1987), American civil servant
