= Anja Community Reserve =

- IUCN category IV (habitat/species management area)
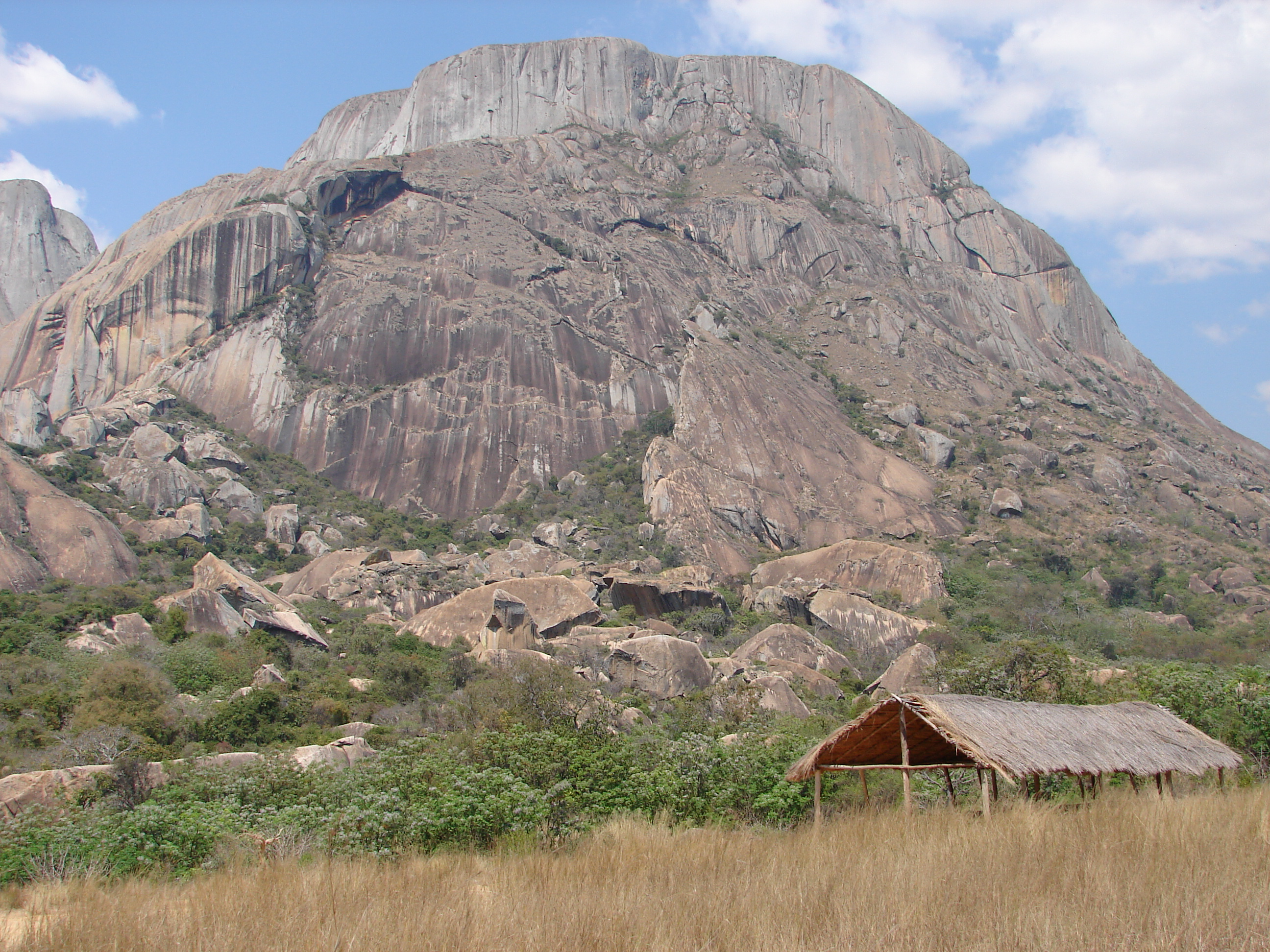
- Interactive map of Anja Community Reserve
- Location: Central and southern Madagascar
- Nearest town: Ambalavao, Fianarantsoa
- Coordinates: 21°51′07″S 46°50′34″E
- Area: 30 hectares
- Established: 2001
- Visitors: 12,000 (in 2011)
- Operator: Association Anja Miray
- Website: https://anjareserve.angelfire.com

The Anja Community Reserve is a woodland area and freshwater lake, situated at the base a large cliff. Much of the reserve is dominated by fallen rocks and boulders and there are two small caves providing habitat for bats and owls. This reserve has much sheltered habitat in the pocket of forest that has established between the vast boulders.

The reserve was created in 2001 with the support on the UNDP to help preserve the local environment and wildlife, and to provide additional employment and income to the local community.

The reserve is home to the highest concentration of maki, or ring-tailed lemurs, in all of Madagascar. The people, who have a belief in not eating the maki, used to sell the maki to outsiders. However, after finding that 95% of makis in Madagascar are now gone, the people initiated the formation of a nature reserve, effectively establishing the world's largest congregation site for makis. Due to its high biological, cultural, and natural importance, scholars have suggested the possibility of its inclusion in the UNESCO World Heritage List.

== Location ==
The reserve is located 13 km south of Ambalavao, between the towns of Fianarantsoa and Ihosy, on National Road 7, and is a popular stop for holiday tours operators traveling between the Antananarivo and the south of Madagascar.

== Visiting Anja ==
Visitors are welcome, but must be accompanied by a local guide. There are two main trails. The shorter trail can be completed in around one to two hours, but you should allow up to six hours for the longer trail which includes a hike to the top of the mountain. Fees apply.

== Maintenance ==
The reserve is maintained by Association Anja Miray, a local group established in response to the degradation of the forest. The association's ecotourism initiative helps to fund community works projects related to education and health alongside conservation activities. The growth of ecotourism has also helped to diversify the local economy, encouraging fish farming and tree nurseries. Previously, forest lands were being cleared for corn planting and lemurs were hunted as a source of protein. The association received support from the United Nations Development Programme (including an Equator Prize in 2012) and the Global Environment Facility.

== Wildlife ==
Anja Reserve is home to about 300 ring-tailed lemurs (Lemur catta) as well as three species of lizard:

- Androngo or the Madagascar Girdled Lizard (Zonosaurus madagascariensis)
- Katasataka or Barbour's day gecko (Phelsuma barbouri)
- Dangalia lizard (Chalarodon madagascariensis)

The ring-tailed lemurs are used to visitors, so it is possible to approach to within a few meters for photos. However, feeding them, which was once permitted, is now prohibited.

Two bizarre species of planthopper are frequently observed at Anja, and the local guides will point out these strange-looking insects to visitors as they pass by. The Flatida rosea nymphs congregate in groups and are covered in white waxy filaments. The Malagasy Lantern Bug (Zanna madagascariensis) has a white waxy dusty coating and a large orange lantern-like snout.

== Gallery ==
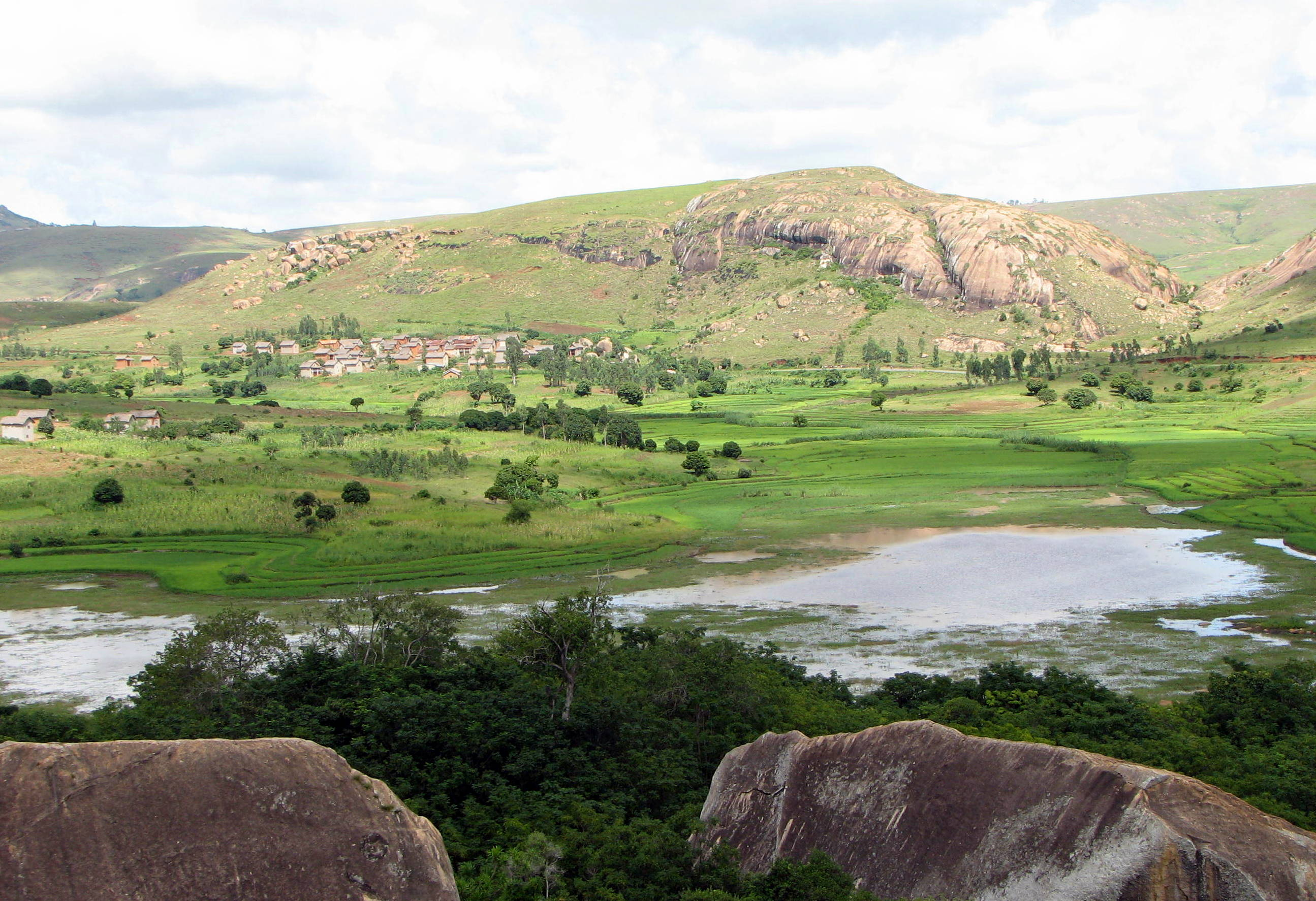
View of lake from the reserve

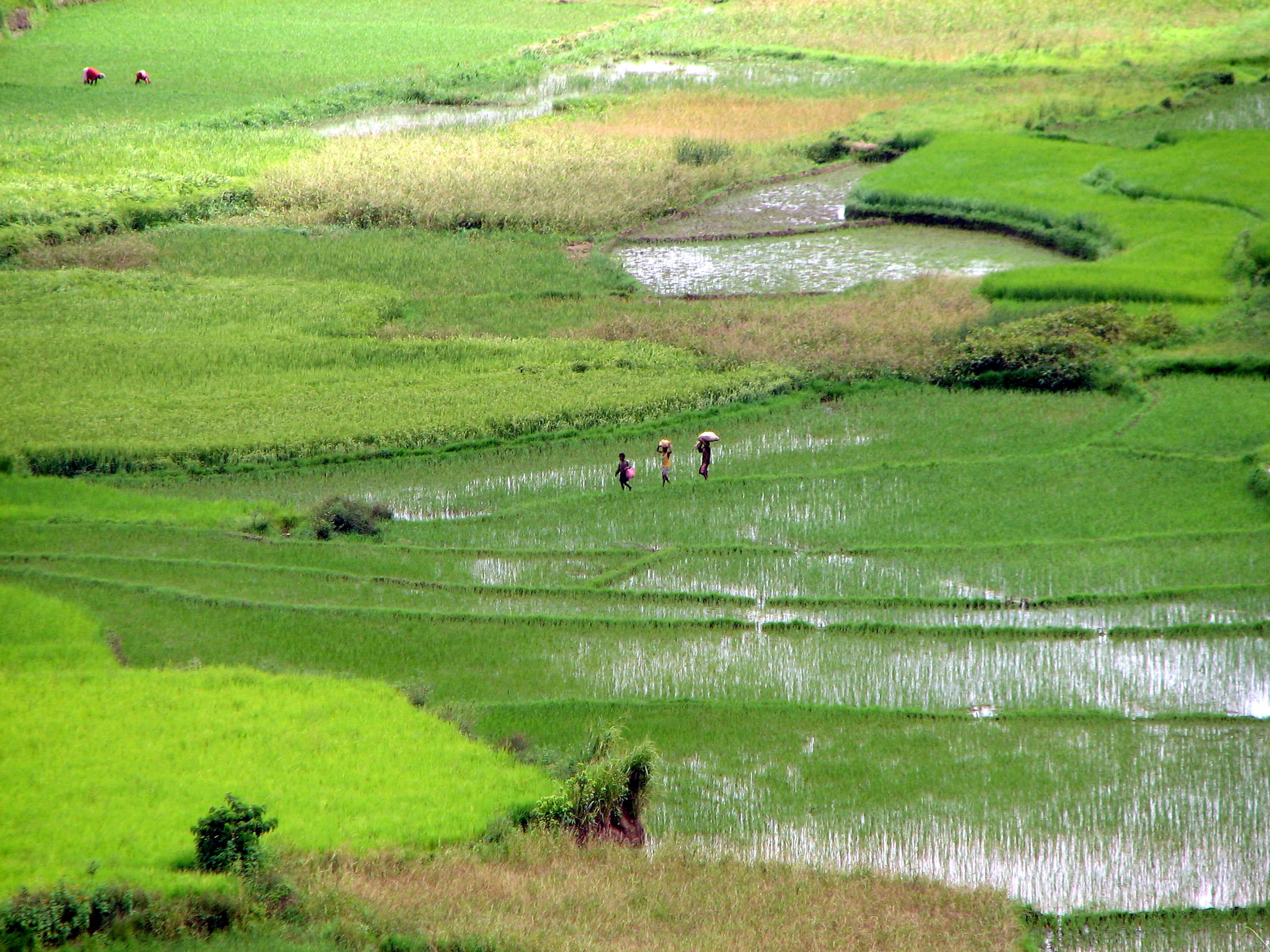
Paddy field near the reserve

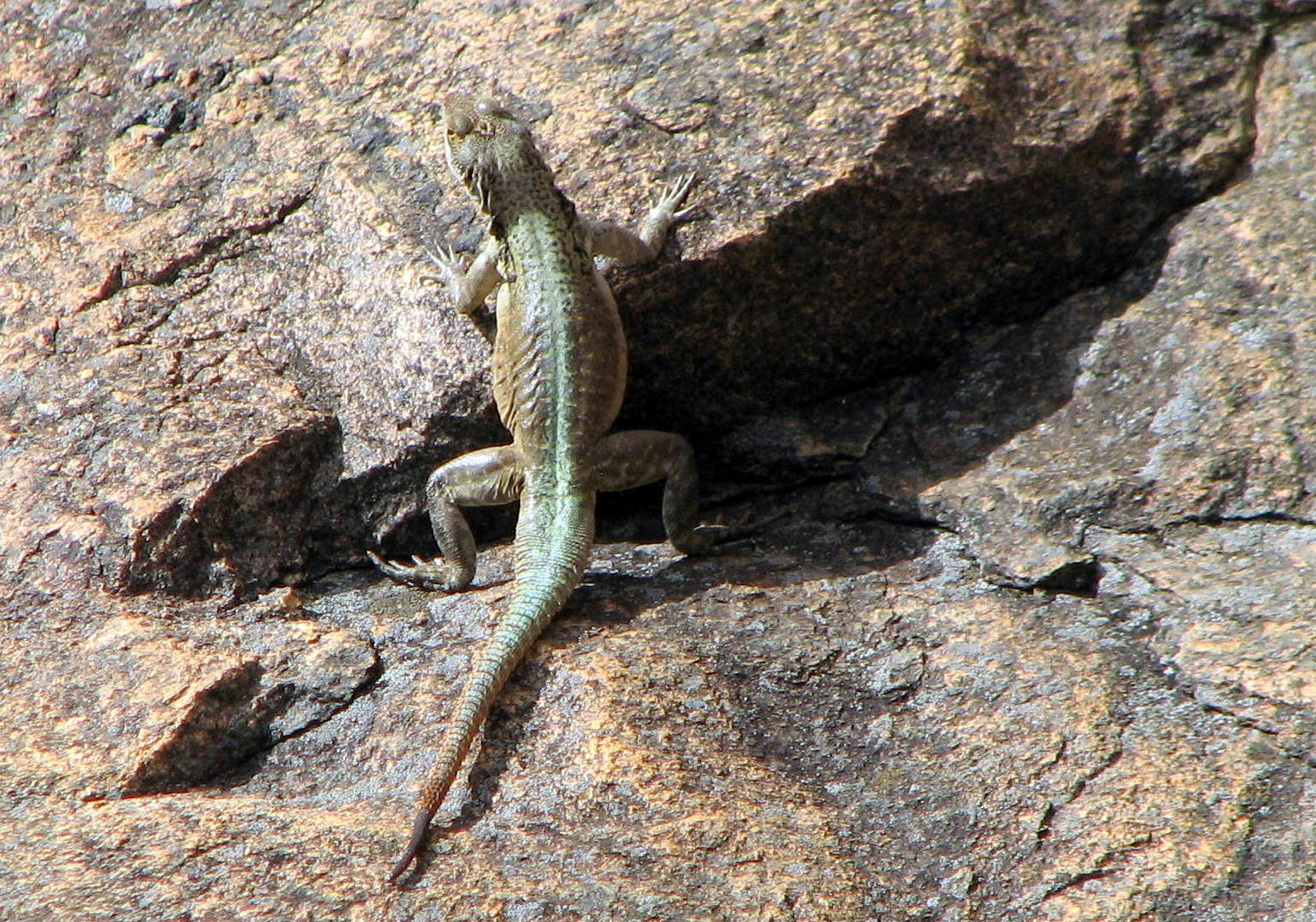
Oplurus grandidieri

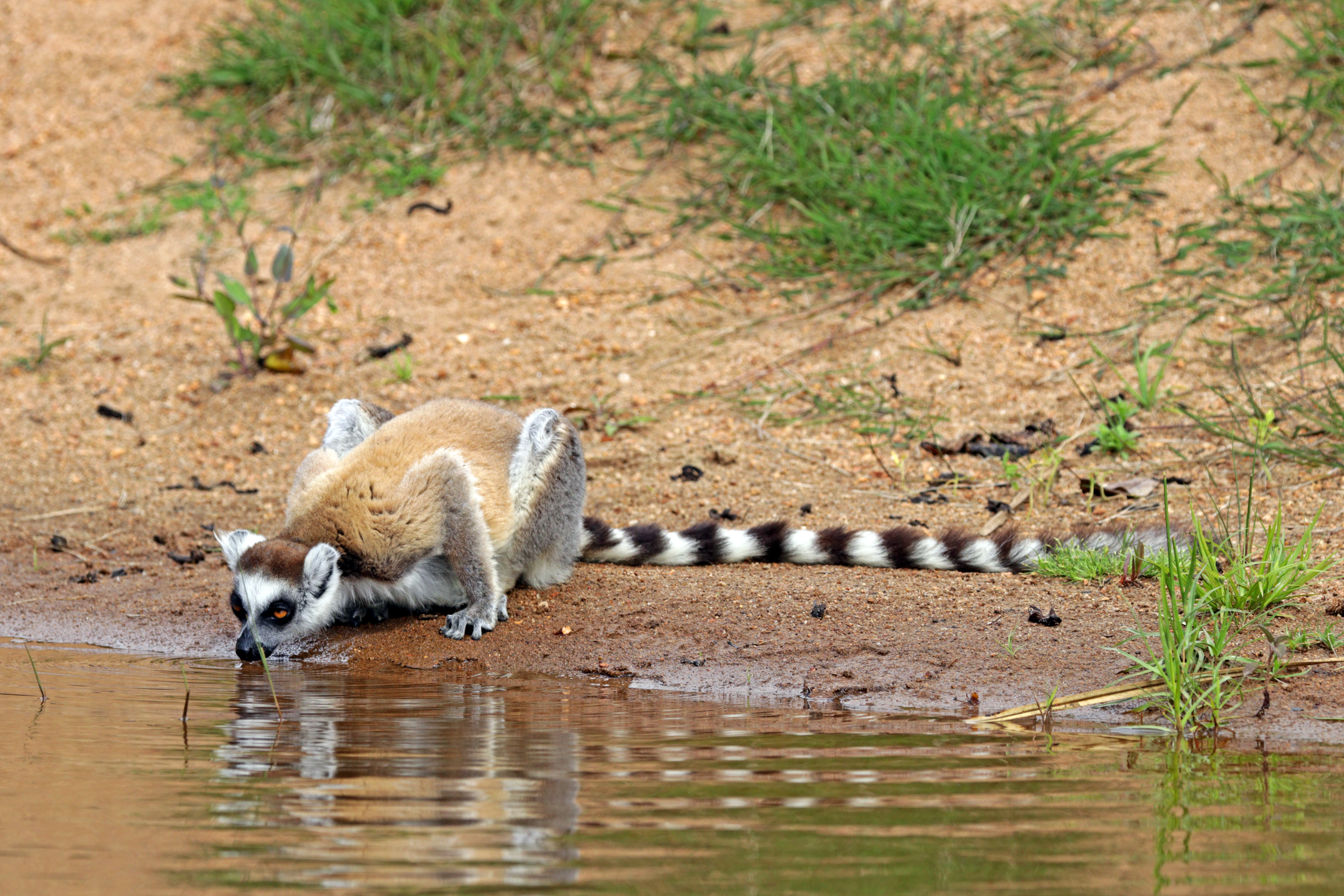
Ring-tailed lemur

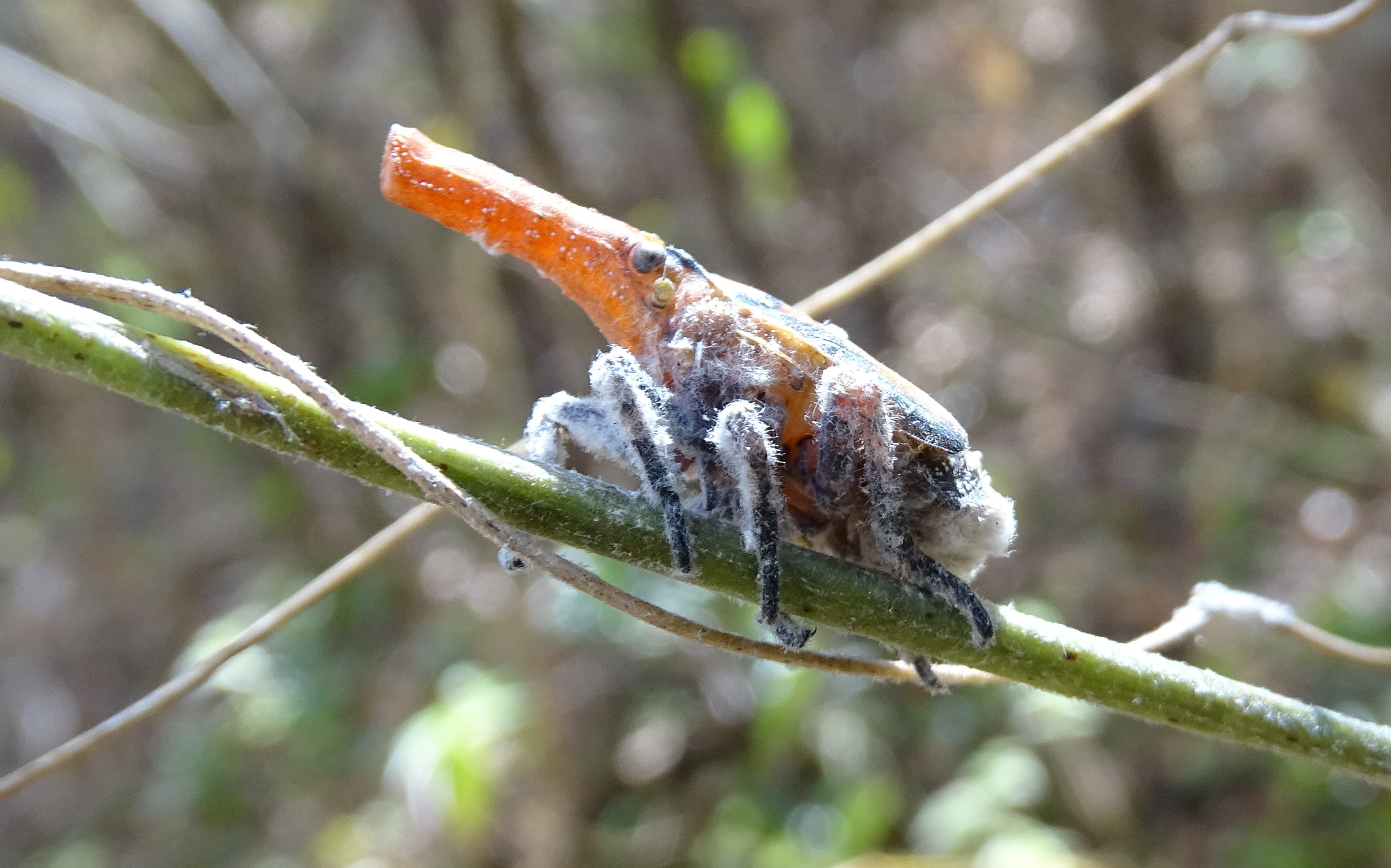
Malagasy Lantern Bug (Zanna madagascariensis)

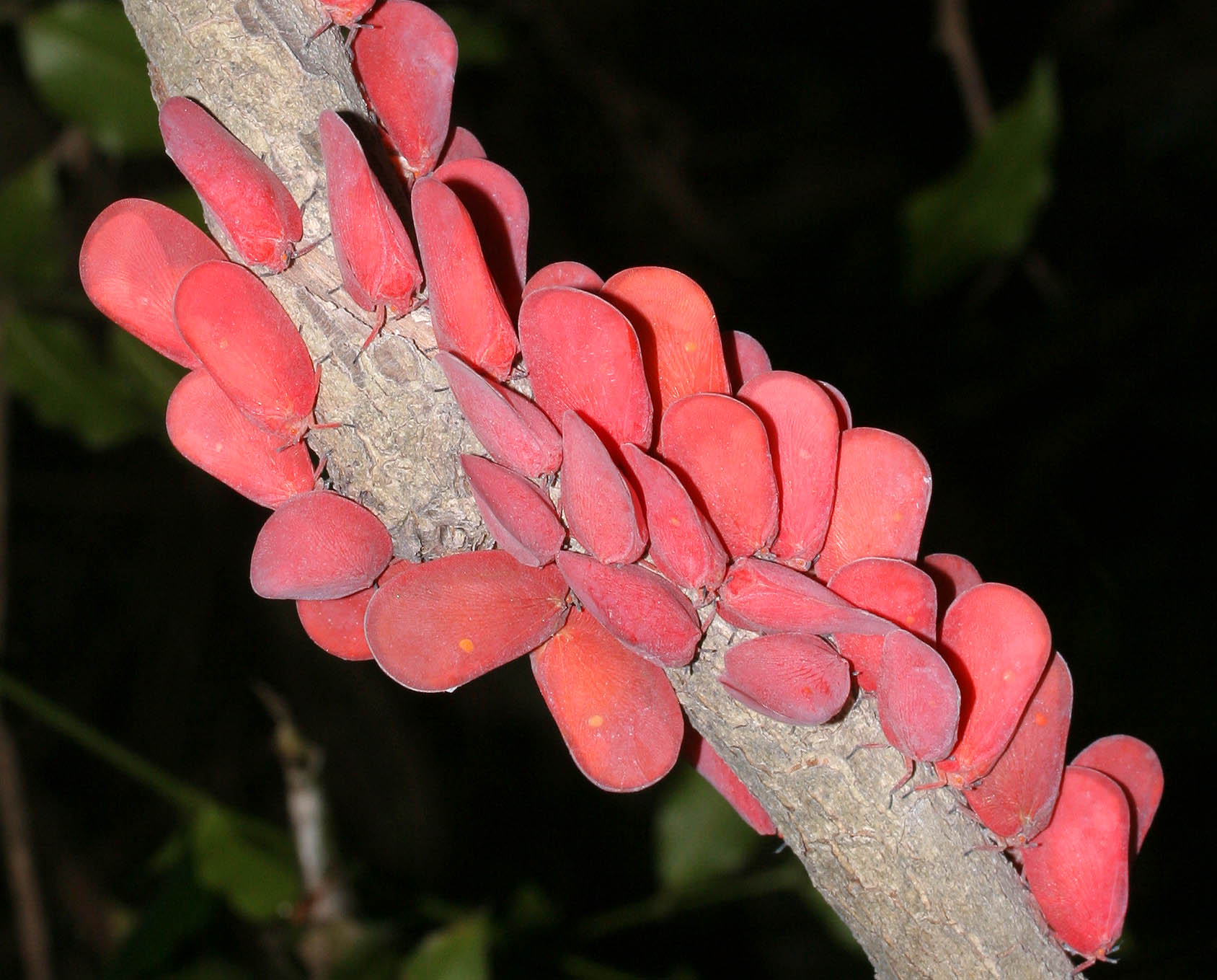
Flatida rosea bugs (Flatidae)
