= Wispelaere =

Wispelaere is a surname. Notable people with the surname include:

- Jean-Philippe Wispelaere (fl. 1998), former intelligence analyst for the Australian Defence Intelligence Organisation
- Paul de Wispelaere (1928–2016), Flemish writer
