= Jean-Louis =

Jean-Louis is a given name, especially for French males.

Notable people named "Jean-Louis" include:

- Jean-Louis Alléon-Dulac, French naturalist
- Jean-Louis Aubert, French singer-songwriter, guitarist, composer and producer
- Jean-Louis Baribeau, Canadian politician and a Member of the House of Commons
- Jean-Louis Barrault, French actor, director and mime artist
- Jean-Louis Baudelocque, French obstetrician
- Jean-Louis Beaudry, Canadian politician and entrepreneur
- Jean-Louis Beffa, French businessman
- Jean-Louis Béland, Canadian politician and Member of the National Assembly of Quebec
- Jean-Louis Bergheaud, better known as Jean-Louis Murat
- Jean-Louis Berlandier, French-Mexican naturalist, physician, and anthropologist
- Jean-Louis Bernard, French author
- Jean Louis Berthauldt (1907–1997), a French-born costume designer also known as Jean Louis
- Jean-Louis Borloo, French politician
- Jean-Louis Bourlanges, French politician
- Jean-Louis Bruguière, French judge
- Jean-Louis Buffet, French musical instrument maker
- Jean-Louis Carra (fr) (1742–1793), a French activist and politician
- Jean-Louis Cortès, French pianist and composer
- Jean-Louis Debré (1944–2025), French judge and politician
- Jean-Louis Gassée (born 1944), best known as an executive at Apple Computer (1981–1990), later founder of Be Inc
- Jean-Louis Gasset (1953–2025), French football player and manager
- Jean-Louis Koszul, French mathematician
- Jean-Louis Lefebvre de Cheverus, a French-born American cardinal
- Jean-Louis Loday, French mathematician
- Jean-Louis Mandengue (born 1971), a French boxer
- Jean-Louis Masurel, a French businessman
- Jean-Louis Michel (fencer), Dominican Creole master in the art of fencing
- Jean-Louis Murat, French singer
- Jean-Louis Palladin, French chef of eponymous restaurant in Washington, DC
- Jean-Louis Pichon (1948–2025), French stage director, opera manager and author
- Jean-Louis Schneiter, French politician
- Jean-Louis Thiériot (born 1969), French politician
- Jean-Louis Valois French professional footballer
- Jean-Louis Vieillard-Baron (born 1944), French philosopher

== As a surname ==
- Firmin Jean-Louis, Haitian politician
- Girardin Jean-Louis, American academic
- Jimmy Jean-Louis, Haitian actor
- Joseph Mécène Jean-Louis, Haitian judge
- Marie-Denise Fabien Jean-Louis (born 1944), Haitian physician and politician
