= Jean-Philippe =

Jean-Philippe may refer to:

- Jean-Philippe (film)
- Jean-Philippe (given name)

== See also ==
- Jean Philippe (1930–2022), French singer
- Jean Philip (1912–1983), French racing cyclist
