= Chrysostome =

Chrysostome may refer to:

- Damien Chrysostome (born 1982), Beninese international footballer
- Jean Chrysostome Randimbisoa (born 1954), Malagasy politician
- Jean-Chrysostôme Bruneteau de Sainte-Suzanne (1773–1830), French Empire baron and general
- Justin Chrysostome Dorsainvil (1880–1942), Haitian author and educator
- Chrysostome Liausu (1807–1839), French Catholic missionary
- Saint-Chrysostome, Quebec, municipality in south-west Quebec, Canada
  - Saint-Jean-Chrysostome, Montérégie, Quebec, a former parish municipality that is now part of Saint-Chrysostome, Quebec
- Saint-Jean-Chrysostome, Lévis, Quebec, district within the City of Lévis in central Quebec, Canada
- Saint-Jean-Chrysostome Aerodrome, (TC LID: CSG5), southeast of Saint-Jean-Chrysostome (Lévis), Quebec, Canada

== See also ==
- Chrysostomos (disambiguation)
- Chrysostomus (disambiguation)
