= Jean-Étienne =

Jean-Étienne is a French given name. Notable people with the name include:

- Jean-Étienne Antoinette (born 1966), French Guianan politician
- Jean-Étienne Championnet (1762–1800), French general
- Jean-Étienne Despréaux (1748–1820), French dancer and singer
- Jean-Étienne Dominique Esquirol (1772–1840), French psychiatrist
- Jean-Étienne Guettard (1715–1786), French naturalist and mineralogist
- Jean-Étienne Marie (1917–1989), French composer
- Jean-Étienne Montucla (1725–1799), French mathematician
- Jean-Étienne Liotard (1702–1789), Swiss-French painter
- Jean-Étienne Valluy (1899–1970), French general
- Jean-Étienne Waddens (1738–1782), Swiss-Canadian fur trader

== See also ==
- Jean (male given name)
- Étienne (disambiguation)
