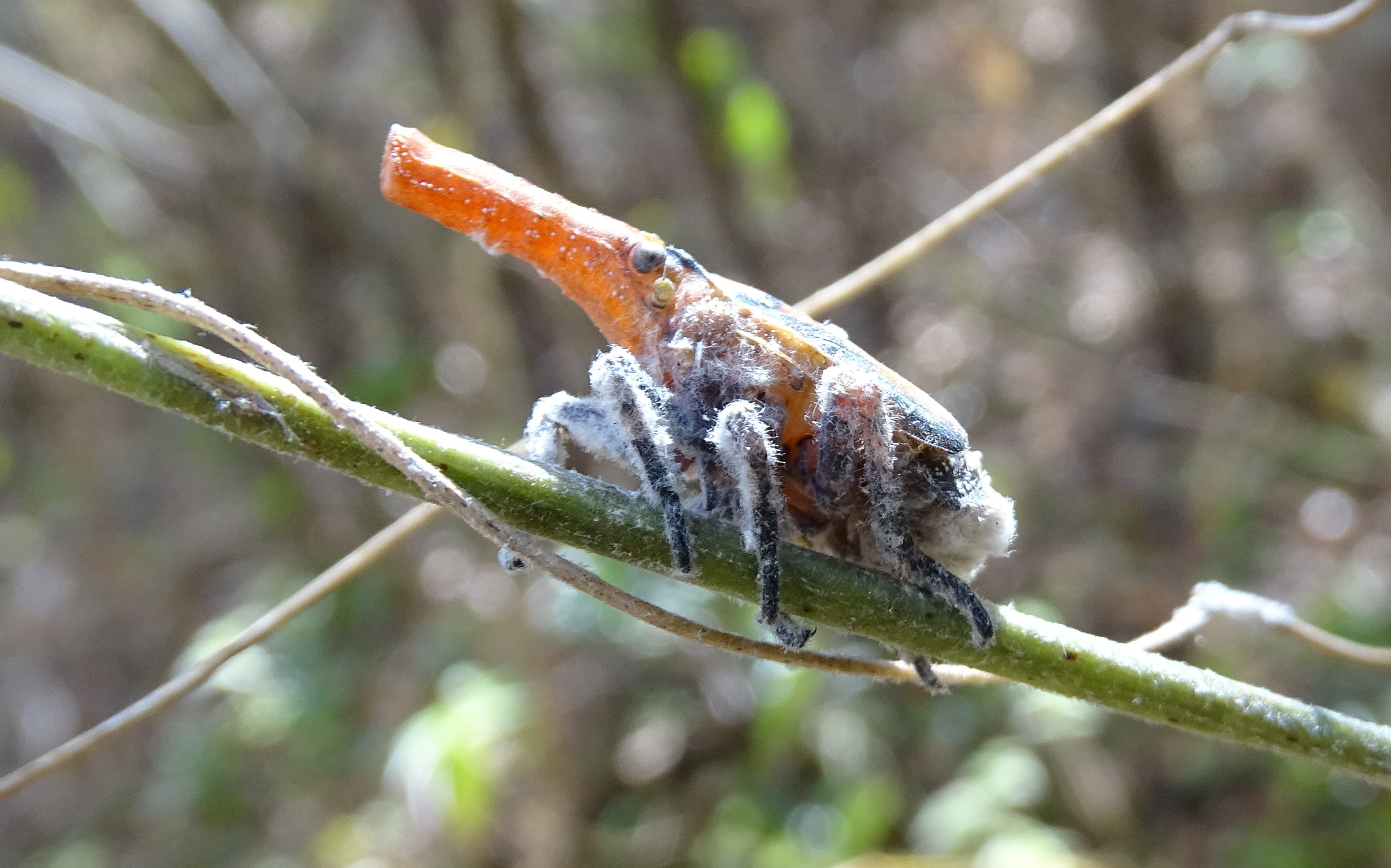
- Lantern bug nymph at the Anja Community Reserve

Scientific classification
- Kingdom: Animalia
- Phylum: Arthropoda
- Class: Insecta
- Order: Hemiptera
- Suborder: Auchenorrhyncha
- Infraorder: Fulgoromorpha
- Family: Fulgoridae
- Genus: Zanna
- Species: Z. tenebrosa

Binomial name
- Zanna tenebrosa (Fabricius, 1775)

Synonyms
- Fulgora tenebrosa Fabricius, 1775; Fulgora africana Palisot de Beauvois, 1820; Zanna madagascariensis (Signoret, 1860); Zanna tenebrosa nosibeana Lallemand, 1959

= Zanna tenebrosa =

Species of planthopper

Zanna tenebrosa is a large planthopper in the subfamily Zanninae in the family Fulgoridae. The nymphs are sometimes referred to as lantern-flies because of their large lantern like snout, although this does not emit light. This species occurs in mainland Africa, and also in Madagascar, where it has often been known under the name Zanna madagascariensis (or as a subspecies, Zanna tenebrosa madagascariensis), and referred to there as the Malagasy lantern bug.

== Description ==
Zanna tenebrosa has a thin coating of white waxy powder and a large orange lantern-like head or snout.

== Identification ==
It can be distinguished from most species by the shape and colour of the head and the colour of the hindwings. The other valid species with such features are flammea and pauliani, the former differing by the apically convex (not truncate) projection of the head, which is called a cephalic process, and from pauliani by the straight (not curved) cephalic process

== Cultural significance ==
In Madagascar, the adult bugs are known as sakandry or sakondry, and are consumed by the rural people; roasted whole, they are reported to taste like bacon.
