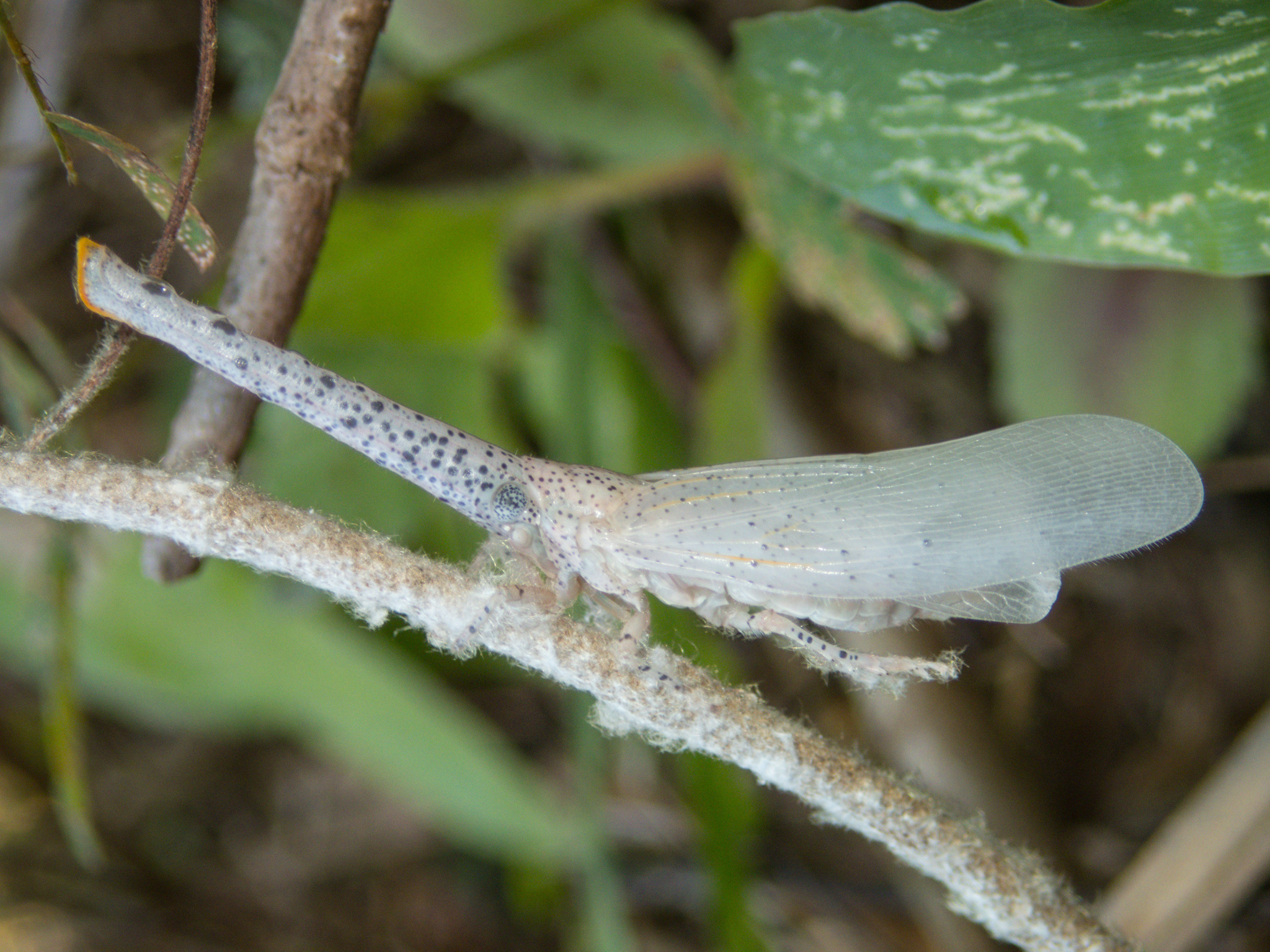

Scientific classification
- Kingdom: Animalia
- Phylum: Arthropoda
- Clade: Pancrustacea
- Class: Insecta
- Order: Hemiptera
- Suborder: Auchenorrhyncha
- Infraorder: Fulgoromorpha
- Family: Fulgoridae
- Genus: Zanna
- Species: Z. chartieri

Binomial name
- Zanna chartieri Constant & Pham, 2024

= Zanna chartieri =

Species of true bug

Zanna chartieri is a species of lantern bug in the family Fulgoridae. It is endemic to Cambodia.

== Ecology ==
Zanna chartieri nymphs have been observed feeding on unidentified species of Desmodium, while the host plants of the adults are as yet unknown.
