= Jean-Luc =

Other names
- Related names: Jean

Jean-Luc may refer to:

== Politics ==
- Jean-Luc Bennahmias (born 1954), a French politician and Member of the European Parliament
- Jean-Luc Bourgeaux (born 1963), a French politician
- Jean-Luc Dehaene (1940–2014), a Flemish politician
- Jean-Luc Fichet (born 1953), French politician
- Jean-Luc Laurent (born 1957), a French politician
- Jean-Luc Mandaba (1943–2000), a former Prime Minister of the Central African Republic
- Jean-Luc Mélenchon (born 1951), a French politician
- Jean-Luc Pépin (1924–1995), a Canadian academic, politician, and Cabinet member
- Jean-Luc Poudroux (born 1950), a French politician

== Entertainment ==
- Jean-Luc De Meyer (born 1957), a Belgian vocalist and lyricist best known as the lead vocalist of Front 242
- Jean-Luc Ponty (born 1942), a French virtuoso violinist and jazz composer
- Jean-Luc Bilodeau (born 1990), an actor, played Josh Trager on the television show Kyle XY and Ben Wheeler on Baby Daddy

== Fictional characters ==
- Jean-Luc, a character in the Bluey episode Camping
- Jean-Luc Gauvin / Codename: France Jr, a superhero in the comic book series The Ambassadors and Big Game
- Jean-Luc Picard, a starship captain in the Star Trek universe

== Other ==
- Jean-Luc Cairon (1962–2022), French gymnast and coach
- Jean-Luc Godard (1930–2022), a Franco-Swiss filmmaker
- Jean-Luc Grand-Pierre (born 1977), a Canadian professional ice hockey defenceman
- Jean-Luc Lagardère (1928–2003), a major French businessman
- Jean-Luc Margot (born 1969), a Belgian astronomer and Professor at UCLA
- Jean-Luc Marion (born 1946), a French philosopher
- Jean-Luc Nancy (1940–2021), a French philosopher
- Jean-Luc du Plessis (born 1994), a South African Rugby Union player

== Variants in other languages ==
- English : John Luke
- Italian : Gianluca
- French : Jean-Luc
- Spanish : Juan Lucas
- Portuguese : João Lucas
- Greek : Γιάννης Λουκά
