= Jean-Martin =

Jean-Martin is a French masculine given name. It may refer to:

- Jean-Martin Aussant, Canadian politician
- Jean-Martin Charcot (1825–1893), French neurologist
- Jean-Martin de Prades (c. 1720–1782), French Catholic theologian
- Jean-Martin Folz (born 1947), French businessman
- Jean-Martin Mbemba (born 1942), Congolese politician and lawyer
- Jean-Martin Moye (1730–1793), French Roman Catholic priest and missionary

== See also ==
- Jean (male given name)
- Martin (name)
