= Jean-Christophe (given name) =

Jean-Christophe is a French masculine given name. Notable people with the name include:

- Jean-Christophe Beaulieu (born 1990), Canadian football player
- Jean-Christophe Bette (born 1977), French competition rower and Olympic champion
- Jean-Christophe Bouissou, French Polynesian politician and leader of the Rautahi political party
- Jean-Christophe Boullion (born 1969), Formula One driver
- Jean-Christophe Borlin (born 1976), French rugby league player
- Jean-Christophe Bouvet (born 1947), French actor, film director and writer
- Jean-Christophe Cambadélis (born 1951), member of the National Assembly of France
- Jean-Christophe Colard (born 1980), French professional football player
- Jean-Christophe Comar (born 1957), French film and visual effects director
- Jean-Christophe Devaux (born 1975), French football player
- Jean-Christophe Guinchard (born 1967), Swiss athlete
- Jean-Christophe Grangé (born 1961), French mystery writer, journalist and screenwriter
- Jean-Christophe Jeauffre, French filmmaker, screenwriter and producer
- Jean-Christophe Lafaille (1965–2006), French mountaineer noted for a number of difficult ascents
- Jean-Christophe Lagarde (born 1967), member of the National Assembly of France
- Jean-Christophe Lamberti (born 1982), French professional football player
- Jean-Christophe Maillot (born 1960), French dancer and choreographer
- Jean-Christophe Marine, Belgian molecular biologist
- Jean-Christophe Mitterrand (born 1946), the son of former French president François Mitterrand
- Jean-Christophe, Prince Napoléon (born 1986), claimant to headship of the House of Bonaparte
- Jean-Christophe Novelli (born 1961), French celebrity chef
- Jean-Christophe Parisot (born 1967), French political scientist and disability activist
- Jean-Christophe Péraud (born 1977), French cyclist
- Jean-Christophe Ravier (born 1979), French racing driver
- Jean-Christophe Rolland (born 1968), French competition rower and Olympic champion
- Jean-Christophe Rouvière (born 1974), French football midfielder
- Jean-Christophe Rufin (born 1952), French physician and novelist
- Jean-Christophe Sarnin (born 1976), French breaststroke swimmer
- Jean-Christophe Simond (born 1960), French figure skater and coach
- Jean-Christophe Spinosi (born 1964), French conductor and violinist
- Jean-Christophe Thomas (born 1964), French football player
- Jean-Christophe Thouvenel (born 1958), French football player
- Jean-Christophe Valtat (born 1968), French writer and teacher
- Jean-Christophe Vergerolle (born 1985), French football player
- Jean-Christophe Yoccoz (1957–2016), French mathematician

== See also ==
- Jean-Christophe, a novel sequence in ten volumes by Romain Rolland
