= Jean-André =

Jean-André is a French masculine given name. It may refer to:

- Jean-André Cuoq (1821–1898), French philologist
- Jean-André Deluc (1727–1817), Swiss geologist and meteorologist
- Jean-André Mongez (1750–1788), French priest and mineralogist
- Jean-André Rixens (1846–1925), French painter

== See also ==
- Jean (male given name)
- André
