= Chrysostomos =

Chrysostomos (golden-mouthed) was a common epithet for orators. Chrysostomos or Chrysostom may refer to:

- Dio Chrysostom (40–120), Greco-Roman philosopher
- John Chrysostom (347–407), bishop of Constantinople and Christian church father and saint
- Chrysostomos of Smyrna (1867–1922), Greek Orthodox bishop of Smyrna (1910–1914, 1919–1922) and saint in the Eastern Orthodox Church
- Chrysostomos of Zakynthos (1890–1958), Greek Orthodox bishop of Zakynthos during the Second World War
- Chrysostomos I of Messinia (1906–1961), Greek Orthodox bishop of Messinia during the Second World War
- Archbishop Chrysostomos I of Athens (1868–1938), Archbishop of Athens (1923–1938)
- Archbishop Chrysostomos II of Athens (1880–1968), Archbishop of Athens (1962–1967)
- Archbishop Chrysostomos I of Cyprus (1927–2007), Archbishop of the Cypriot Orthodox Church (1977–2006)
- Archbishop Chrysostomos II of Cyprus (1941–2022), Archbishop of the Cypriot Orthodox Church (2006–2022)
- Chrysostomos, a town on Icaria, Greece

== People with the name ==
- Johann Chrysostom Magnenus (1590-1679), French physician and atomist
- Jan Chryzostom Pasek (1636–1701), Polish nobleman and writer
- Ján Chryzostom Korec (1924–2015), Slovak Jesuit priest and cardinal of the Roman Catholic Church
- Yoohanon Mar Chrysostom (born 1944), Catholic Bishop of the Eparchy of Pathanamthitta, Kerala, India

== See also ==
- Chrysostome (disambiguation)
- Chrysostomus (disambiguation)
- Crisostomo
