= Zanna intricata =

Scientific classification
- Kingdom: Animalia
- Phylum: Arthropoda
- Class: Insecta
- Order: Hemiptera
- Suborder: Auchenorrhyncha
- Infraorder: Fulgoromorpha
- Family: Fulgoridae
- Genus: Zanna
- Species: Z. intricata

Binomial name
- Zanna intricata Walker, 1858

Synonyms
- Pyrops basilacteus Schmidt, 1906

Species of true bug

Zanna intricata is an African species of lantern bug in the family Fulgoridae.

== Identification ==
Zanna intricata can be distinguished from all other African Fulgoridae by the head strongly inflated at the tip and the prominent veins. It is usually somewhat dark brownish orange.
