= Girardin Jean-Louis =

American academic

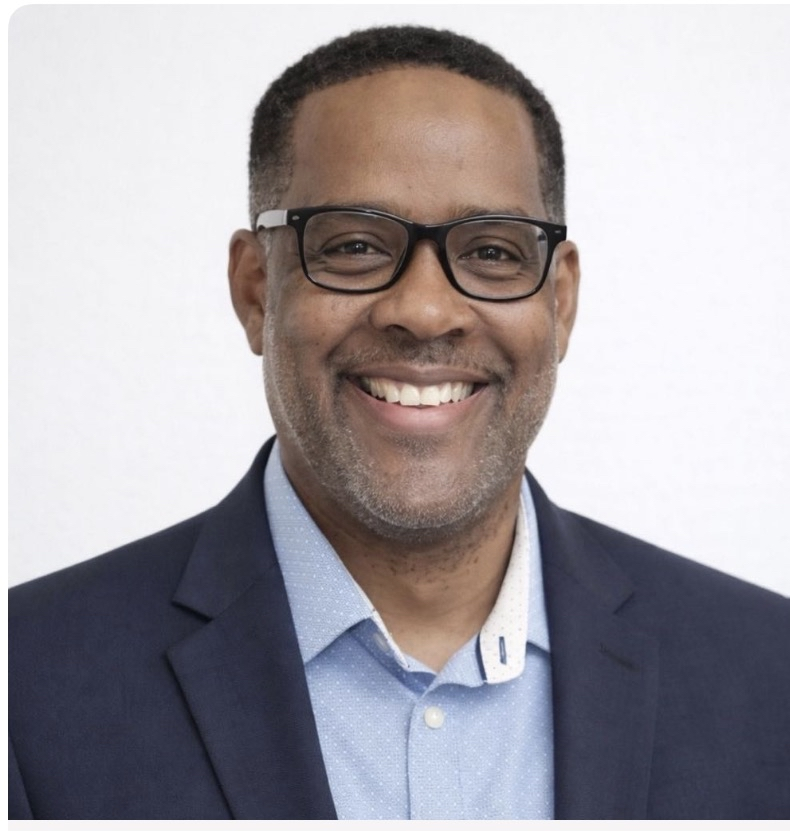
- Jean-Louis in 2020
- Education: City University of New York
- Scientific career
- Thesis: The effects of melatonin on sleep and cognition in cognitively impaired elderly individuals : a chronobiological perspective (1997)

Girardin Jean-Louis is an American academic and translational scientist who serves as Professor in the Departments of Psychiatry and Neurology at the University of Miami Miller School of Medicine. He directs the Translational Sleep & Circadian Sciences program and the NIH-funded PRIDE Institute in Behavioral Medicine & Sleep Disorders Research (PRIME-BSM). Jean-Louis has authored 400+ publications (peer-reviewed papers, book chapters, and scientific proceedings) spanning sleep/circadian biology, cardiometabolic and brain health, and implementation science. He has authored 275 peer-reviewed papers and 322 chapters and scientific proceedings, which have collectively accrued 16,654 citations (h-index 67) and more than 102,000 reads. Jean-Louis’ work on translational behavioral sleep and circadian science, particularly decentralized, community-based approaches, has been featured in Science and NPR. He has held national advisory roles at the NIH Sleep Disorders Research Advisory Board and the National Advisory Council for the National Center for Complementary and Integrative Health (NCCIH), Sleep Research Society Board of Directors among others. Dr. Jean-Louis has mentored and coached more than 200 trainees and early-career investigators, many from groups historically excluded from biomedical research, guiding them to secure competitive NIH and foundation funding, leadership roles, and impactful careers in academia and beyond.

== Early life and education ==
Jean-Louis grew up in Haiti. After immigrating to New York City at 17, he studied engineering at the City College of New York, where an elective in sleep laboratory methods sparked his interest in sleep and circadian sciences. He earned his PhD at the Graduate Center of the City University of New York, focusing on melatonin’s effects on sleep and cognition in older adults. He completed postdoctoral training in sleep and chronobiology at the University of California, San Diego.

== Research and career ==
Jean-Louis investigates how sociocultural and environmental determinants shape sleep and circadian health and, in turn, cardiometabolic and neurocognitive outcomes. His research includes the use of actigraphy and wearable devices for measuring sleep-wake behavior in community settings. A core thrust of his program addresses sleep health disparities, including under-diagnosis and under-treatment of obstructive sleep apnea in Black communities, and develops pragmatic, community-based strategies to improve screening, adherence, and outcomes. His research has included community-based sleep screening programs conducted in churches, barbershops, beauty salons, and community centers. At Miami, Jean-Louis leads multi-sector platforms that integrate probability-sampled cohorts, multilingual engagement, actigraphy/smartphone passive sensing, and remote sensing of light at night, heat, noise, and green space, paired with advanced biomarker panels relevant to cardiometabolic risk and neurodegeneration. He is also an advocate for decentralized clinical trials, AI-enabled analytics, and open-science pipelines to accelerate translation.

== Mentorship and leadership ==
As Director of the PRIME-BSM Institute, he created community-centered mentorship ecosystems that combined science and sponsorship with equity. Dr. Jean-Louis is considered to have changed mentoring from an individual act of generosity into an infrastructure for the next generation of scientific leaders. He is recognized for leadership and mentorship across career stages, with many mentees assuming research and leadership roles.

== Honors and recognition ==
Named one of the Community of Scholars' 1,000 Inspiring Black Scientists in America (2020).

Mary A. Carskadon Outstanding Educator Award, Sleep Research Society (2021).

Diversity, Equity, and Inclusion Leadership Award, American Academy of Sleep Medicine (2022).

Elected to the Academy of Science, Engineering and Medicine of Florida (2023).

Served on the NIH Sleep Disorders Research Advisory Board.

Served on the National Advisory Council of the National Center for Complementary and Integrative Health (NCCIH).
