= Jean-Marc Pastor =

French politician

Jean-Marc Pastor (born 12 February 1950) is a member of the Senate of France, representing the Tarn department. He is a member of the Socialist Party.
