= Jean Chrysostome Randimbisoa =

Malagasy politician (born 1954)

Jean Chrysostome Randimbisoa (born November 17, 1954, in Ambalavao) is a Malagasy politician. He is a member of the Senate of Madagascar for Amoron'i Mania, and is a member of the Tiako i Madagasikara party.
