= Jean-Henri =

Jean-Henri is a French masculine given name. Notable people with the name include:

- Jean-Henri d'Anglebert (1629–1691), French composer and harpsichordist
- Jean-Henri Dunant (1828–1910), a.k.a. Henry Dunant, a Swiss businessman
- Jean Henri Fabre (1823–1915), French entomologist and author
- Jean-Henri Gourgaud (1746–1809), French actor under the stage name Dugazon
- Jean-Henri Hottinguer (1803–1866), the first-born son of Baron Jean-Conrad, thus making him his successor
- Jean-Henri Izamo (died 1966), the head of the gendarmerie of the Central African Republic
- Jean-Henri Merle d'Aubigné (1794–1872), Swiss Protestant minister and historian of the Reformation
- Jean-Henri Pape (1787–1875), French piano maker
- Jean-Henri Ravina (1818–1906), French virtuoso pianist, composer and teacher
- Jean Henri Riesener (1734–1806), French royal ébéniste
- Jean-Henri Voulland (1751–1801), politician of the French Revolution

== See also ==
- Jean Gery (before 1638–1690?) (also spelled Jean Henri), a French explorer and a deserter from the La Salle expedition of 1685
