= Jean-Marc Moret =

Swiss archaeologist and art historian (born 1942)

Jean-Marc Moret (born 6 June 1942 in Geneva, Switzerland) is a Swiss archaeologist and art historian. He was a professor of art history and archaeology at the Université Louis Lumière (Lyon II) (Lyon, France). He took part in the excavation in Metaponto with Antonio De Siena and in Palmyra with the Polish team led by Michal Gawlikowski. He also started two excavations in Italy, in Ostia Antica (the Schola del Traiano) and in Garaguso (Basilicata). He is known as a major specialist of ancient iconography. His master work, l'Ilioupersis dans la céramique Italiote, is considered to be an important publication on South Italian vase painting and iconography.

== Selected publications ==
=== Books ===
- (in French) L'Ilioupersis dans la céramique italiote. Les mythes et leur expression figurée au IVe siècle, Roma 1975.
- (in French) Œdipe, la Sphinx et les Thébains. Essai de mythologie iconographique, Roma 1984.
- (in French) Les pierres gravées représentant le rapt du Palladion, Mainz am Rhein 1997.
- (in Italian) I marmi di Garaguso. Vittorio di Cicco e l'imbroglio della loro scoperta, Venosa 2014.
- (in French) "Ce morcel ne puis avaler" Images entre histoire et théologie au XIIe et XIIIe siècles, Genève 2017.
- (in French) "Le tableau unique qui résumera tous les autres" Francis Bacon à travers Manet et Velasquez, Genève 2018.
- (in French) De Lautréamont à Francis Bacon : les films de Cocteau comme lien intertextuel, Paris 2019.
- (in French) Maniérisme et cicéronianisme. Deux courants convergents dans la Rome du XVIe siècle, Genève 2021.
- (in French) L'assassinat de la vérité scientifique dans l'université et le monde de la recherche, Genève 2022.
- (in French) Vico et Winckelman, Genève 2024.
- (in French) De Latréaumont à Lautréamont, Genève 2025.

=== Other publications ===
- (in French) "Le départ de Bellérophon sur un cratère campanien de Genève", Antike Kunst 15.2 (1972), pp. 95-106.
- (in French) "Le jugement de Pâris Grande-Grèce : mythe et actualité politique. A propos du lébès paestan d'une collection privée", Antike Kunst 21.2 (1978), pp. 76-98.
- (in French) "Un ancêtre du phylactère : le pilier inscrit des vases italiotes", Revue Archéologique 22.1 (1979), pp. 3-34.
- (in French) "L' "apollinisation" de l'imagerie légendaire à Athènes dans la seconde moitié du Ve siècle", Revue Archéologique 25.2 (1982), pp. 109-136.
- (in French) "Ἰώ ἀποταυρουμένη", Revue Archéologique (1990), pp. 3-26.
- (in French) "Circé tisseuse sur les vases du Cabirion", Revue Archéologique 34.2 (1991), pp. 227-266.
- (in English) "The Earliest Representations of the Infant Herakles and the Snakes" in B. K. Braswell, A Commentary on Pindar Nemean One, Fribourg 1992, pp. 83-98.
- (in French) "Les départs des Enfers dans l’imagerie apulienne", Revue Archéologique 36.2 (1993), pp. 293-351.
- (in French) "Le problème des faux en glyptique : à propos de l'Hermès de Dioscouridès et du scarabée de Laocoon", Compte Rendu de l'Académie des Inscriptions et des Belles Lettres (1995), pp. 173-189.
- (in French) "Un groupe de scarabées italiques", Journal des Savants (1995), pp. 31-64.
- (in French) "L'œuvre de Marie-Louise Vollenweider" in M. Avisseau Broustet (ed.), La glyptique des mondes classiques. Mélanges en l’honneur de Marie-Louise Vollenweider, Paris 1997.
- (in French) "Observations sur certaines peintures tombales de Kizilbel en Lycie du Nord-Est" (with H. Metzger), Journal des Savants (1999), pp. 295-318.
- (in French) "Le Diomède Richelieu et le Diomède Albani. Survie et rencontre de deux statues antiques", Revue Archéologique 42.2 (1999), pp. 227-282.
- (in French) "Olivier Reverdin", Gnomon 73 (2001), pp. 569-572.
- (in French) "Le Laocoon agenouillé : généalogie d'un type iconographique", Revue Archéologique 45.1 (2002), pp. 3-29.
- (in French) "Médée à Eleusis" in Collection Archéologie et Histoire de l’Antiquité de l’Université Lumière-Lyon 2, vol. VII : Les cultes locaux dans les mondes grec et romain. Actes du colloque de Lyon (7-8 juin 2001), Paris 2004, pp. 143-151.
- (in French) "Dessins sans dessein : une clé de lecture simple pour les métopes 13-20 Sud du Parthénon" (with D. Gasparro), Revue Archéologique 48.1 (2005), pp. 3-25.
- (in Italian) "Le feste dei Nani" in Ch. Bocherens (ed.), Nani in Festa. Iconografia, religione e politica a Ostia durante il secondo triumvirato, Bari 2012, pp. 49-108.
- (in Italian) "Ostia, Roma, Tibur : Hercules Victor e I pirati" in Ch. Bocherens (ed.), Nani in Festa. Iconografia, religione e politica a Ostia durante il secondo triumvirato, Bari 2012, pp. 109-135.
- (in Italian) "I nani di Antonio" in Ch. Bocherens (ed.), Nani in Festa. Iconografia, religione e politica a Ostia durante il secondo triumvirato, Bari 2012, pp. 137-162.
- (in Italian) "Arte "popolare" e tradizione ellenistica" in Ch. Bocherens (ed.), Nani in Festa. Iconografia, religione e politica a Ostia durante il secondo triumvirato, Bari 2012, pp. 163-177.
- (in French) "Les Iconocentristes, les Philodramatistes et les Arbitres", Bulletin Antieke Beschavingen, 88 (2013), pp. 171-189.

== Excavation ==
He began excavating in 1999 the so-called Schola del Traiano at Ostia Antica. In 2008, he began excavating the so-called Vigna Manzi at Garaguso (Basilicata).
