= Jean-Marc Juilhard =

French politician

- Born: 5 February 1940; Saint-Sandoux, Puy-de-Dôme, France
- Died: 27 July 2023 (aged 83); Saint-Sandoux, Puy-de-Dôme, France
- Occupation: French politician
- Known for: member of the Senate of France

Jean-Marc Juilhard (5 February 1940 – 27 July 2023) was a French politician who was a member of the Senate of France from 2001 to 2011. He represented the Puy-de-Dôme department and was a member of the Union for a Popular Movement Party.
