= Chrysostomus =

Chrysostomus (meaning "golden mouth" in Greek) may refer to:

- Dio Chrysostom (c. 40 - c. 115 AD), Greek philosopher, also known as Dion of Prusa
- Johannes Chrysostomus Wolfgangus Theophilus Mozart, the baptismal name of composer Wolfgang Amadeus Mozart
- John Chrysostom (347-407), Early Church Father and Christian saint

== See also ==
- Chrysostomos (disambiguation)
- Chrysostome (disambiguation)
