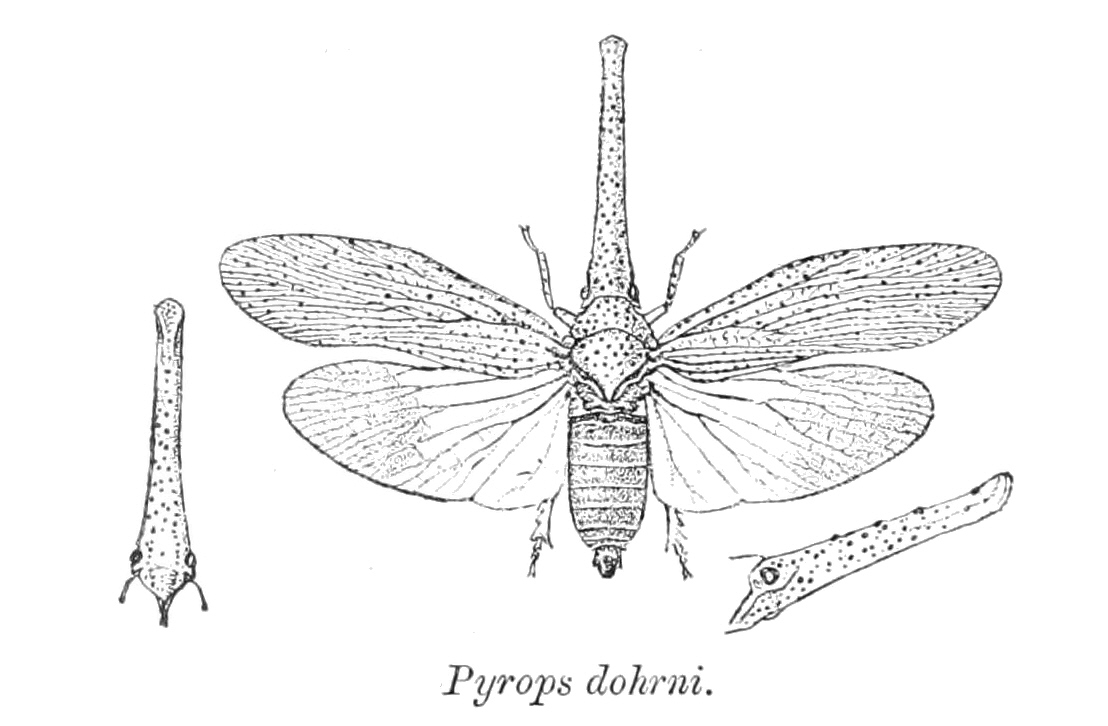
- Zanna dohrni (earlier placed in Pyrops)

Scientific classification
- Kingdom: Animalia
- Phylum: Arthropoda
- Clade: Pancrustacea
- Class: Insecta
- Order: Hemiptera
- Suborder: Auchenorrhyncha
- Infraorder: Fulgoromorpha
- Family: Fulgoridae
- Tribe: Zannini
- Genus: Zanna; Kirkaldy, 1902

Type species
- Zanna tenebrosa (Fabricius, 1775)

Species
- See text

= Zanna (planthopper) =

Genus of planthoppers

Zanna is a genus of tropical planthoppers (family Fulgoridae) found in Asia and Africa, now belonging to the monotypic subfamily Zanninae.

== Taxonomy ==
The tribe Zannini previously contained other genera, but its placement was the subject to debate: it is now the only genus and placed in the Zanninae at the sub-family level. However, although currently placed in the family Fulgoridae, molecular studies question this placement, as the genus is sister taxon to the Dictyopharidae and Fulgoridae combined, rather than Fulgoridae alone.

== Description ==
The forewings are bodies are mostly grey with black speckling, and they have a long head process with small lateral spines and some folds on the surface.

== Gallery ==
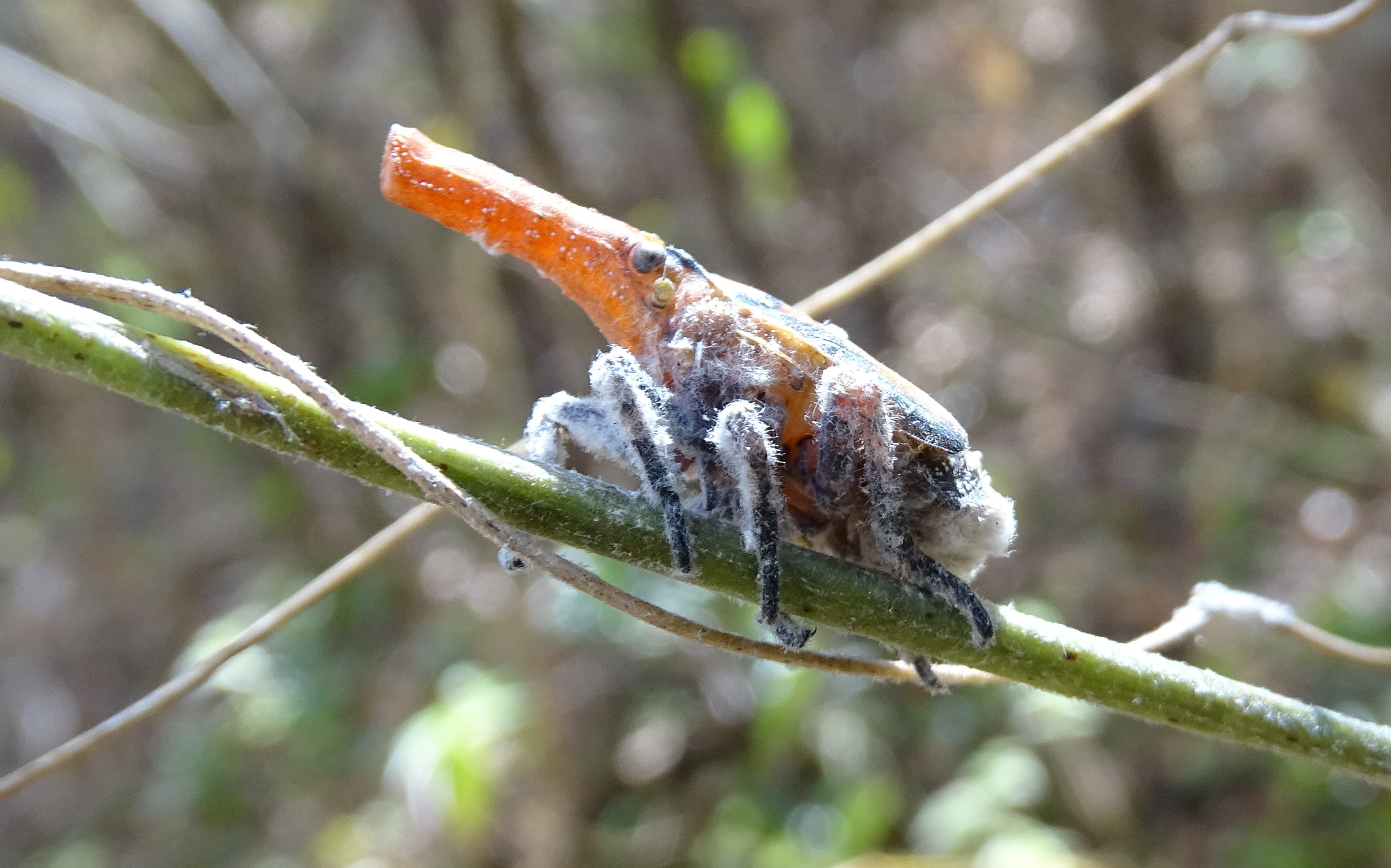
Z. tenebrosa nymph

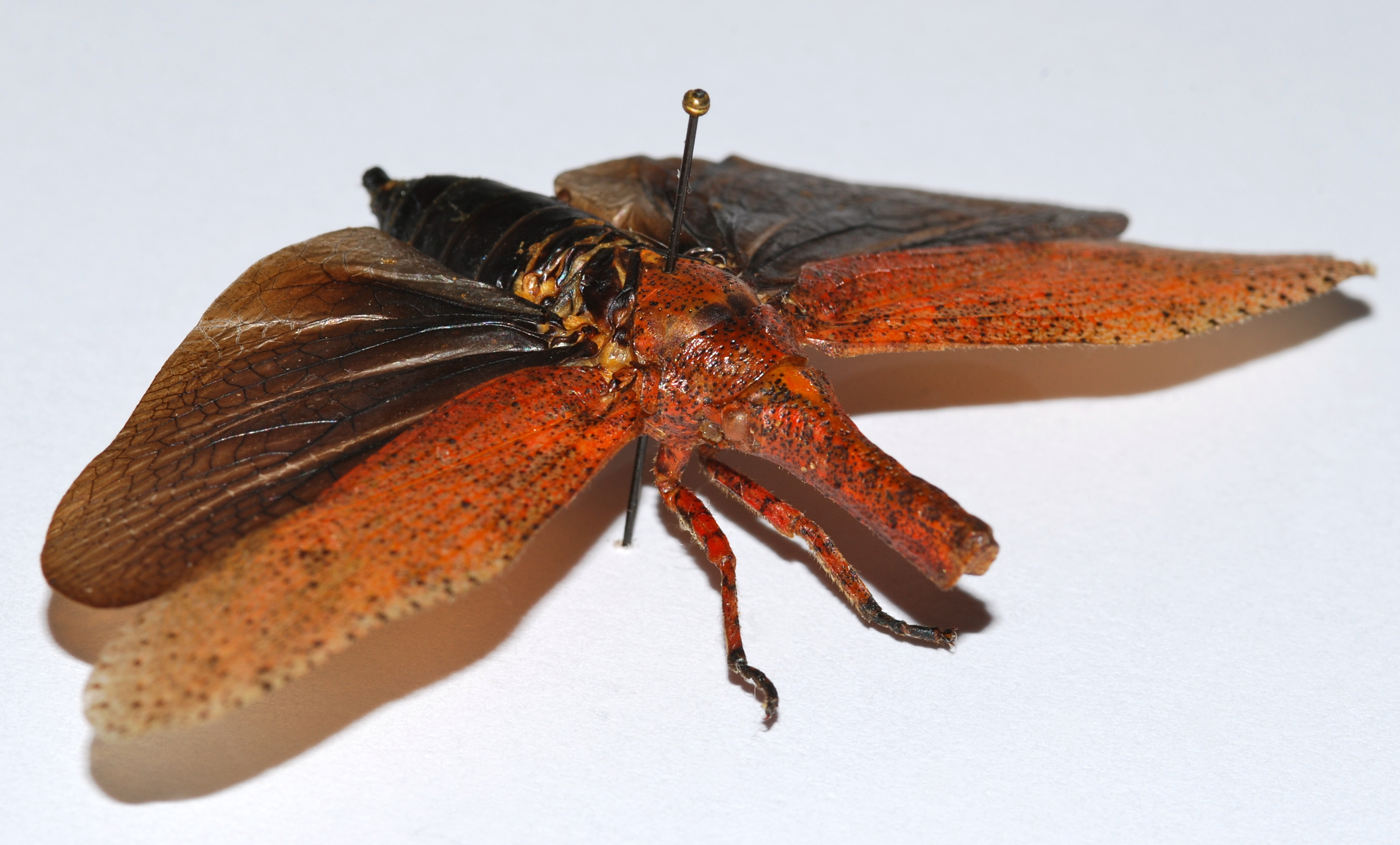
Zanna tenebrosa, the type species of the genus; (Madagascar)

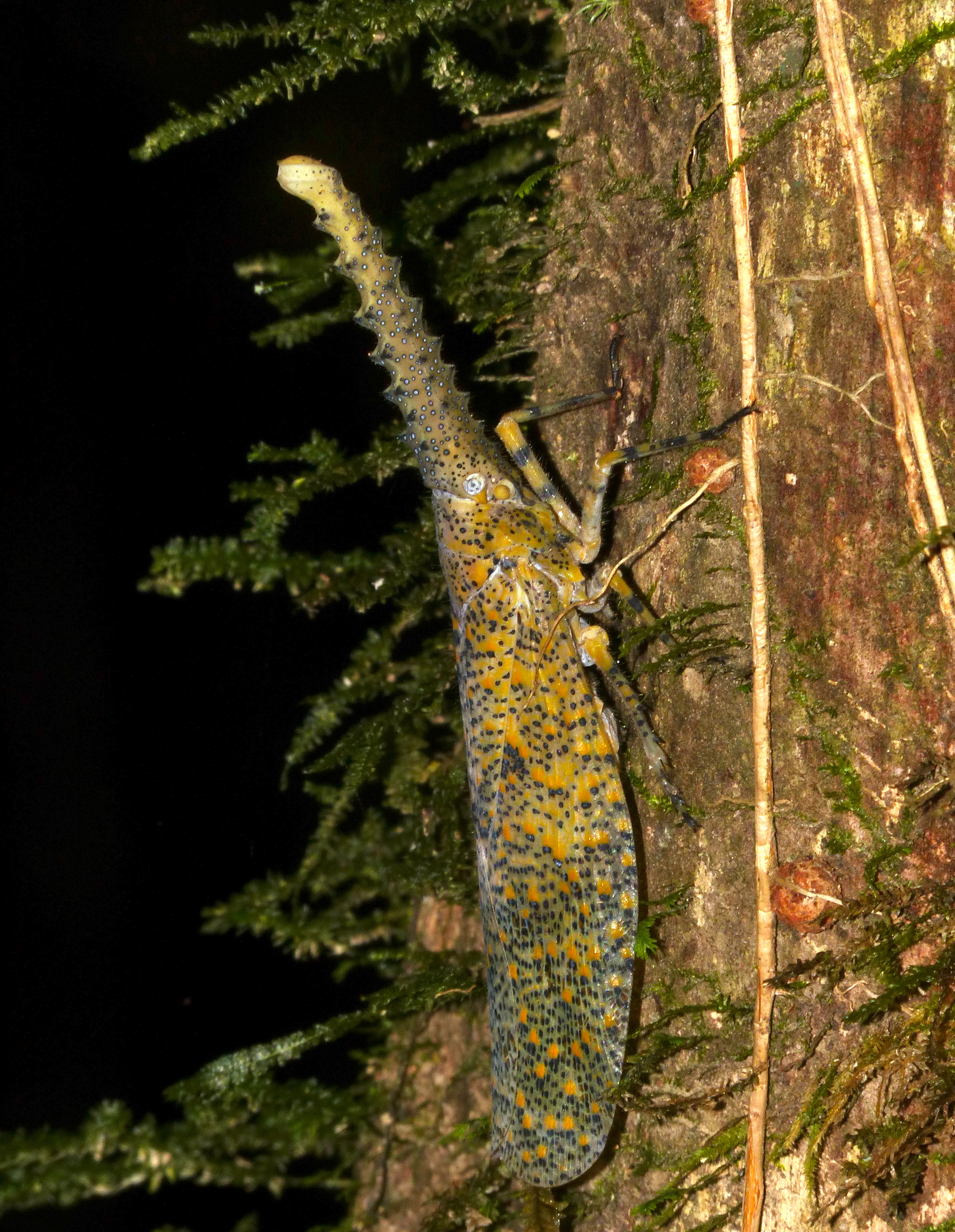
Z. terminalis (Borneo)

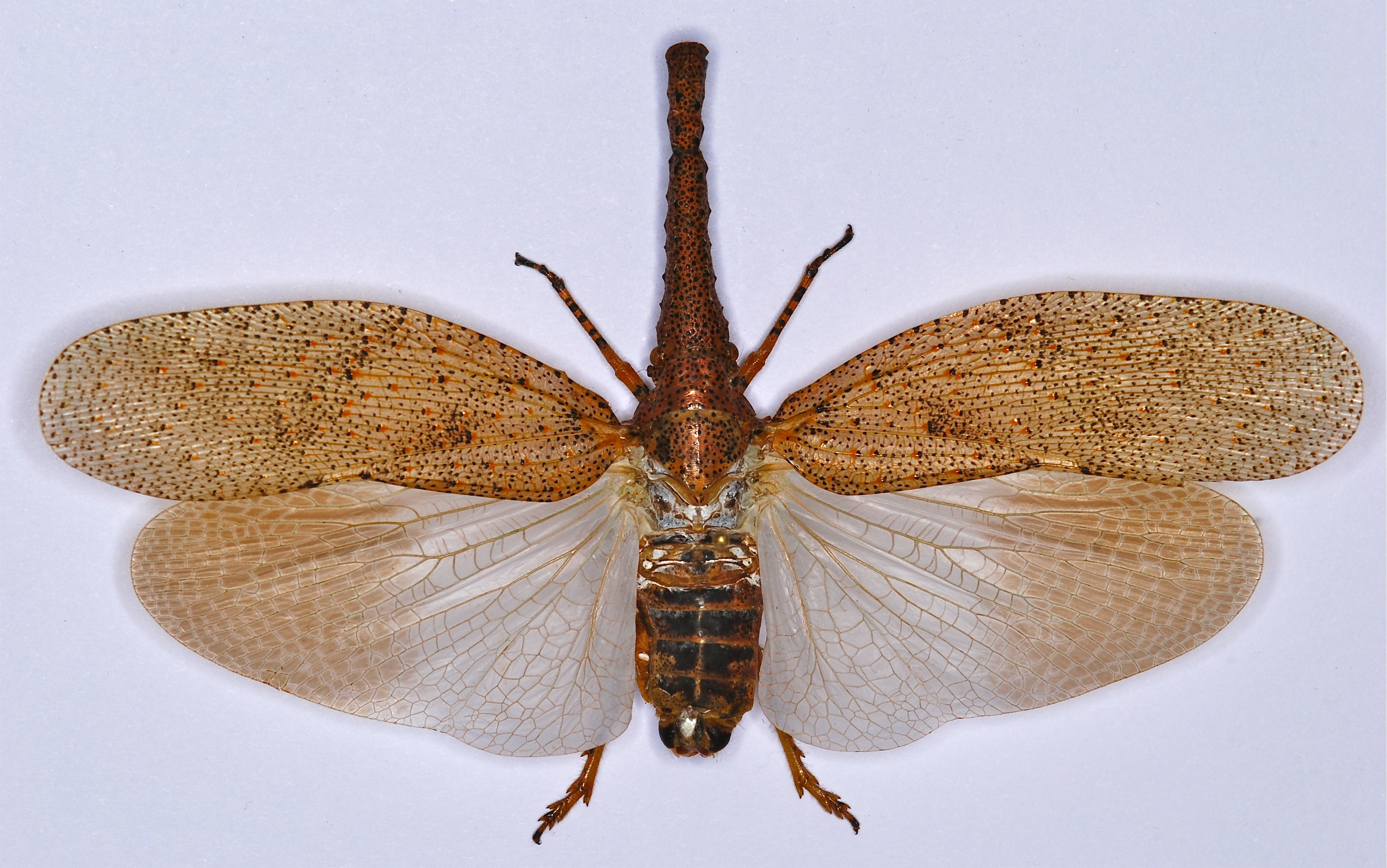
Z. servillei (Sumatra)

== Species ==
The following species are recognised in the genus Zanna:

- Zanna affinis (Westwood, 1838) - India, Nepal, Indonesia (Java)
- Zanna angolana Lallemand, 1959 - Angola
- Zanna ascendens Lallemand, 1959 - Africa
- Zanna baculus (Gerstaecker, 1895) - Sierra Leone
- Zanna basibrunnea (Schmidt, 1906)
- Zanna beieri Lallemand, 1959 - Africa
- Zanna bidoupana Constant & Pham, 2024 - Vietnam
- Zanna bouriezi Lallemand, 1959 - Africa
- Zanna capensis Lallemand, 1966 - Africa
- Zanna chartieri Constant & Pham, 2024 - Cambodia
- Zanna chennelli (Distant, 1906) - Assam
- Zanna chinensis (Distant, 1893) - India, China (Yunnan), Thailand, Japan
- Zanna chopardi Lallemand, 1942 - Africa
- Zanna clavaticeps (Karsch, 1890) - DR Congo, Rwanda
- Zanna dalyi (Distant, 1905) - Thailand
- Zanna dohrni (Stål, 1858) - India, Sri Lanka, Indonesia (Java)
- Zanna flammea (Linné, 1763)
- Zanna intricata (Walker, 1858) - Africa
- Zanna kusamae Constant & Pham, 2024 - Vietnam
- Zanna limbourgi Constant & Pham, 2024 - Cambodia
- Zanna nobilis (Westwood, 1838)
- Zanna orientalis Lallemand, 1959 (likely synonym of Saiva transversolineata
- Zanna ornata Melichar, 1908
- Zanna pauliani (Lallemand, 1950)
- Zanna punctata (Olivier, 1791)
- Zanna pustulosa Gerstaecker, 1873
- Zanna rendalli Distant, 1905
- Zanna robusticephalica Liang, 2017 - China (Yunnan)
- Zanna schweizeri (Schmidt, 1906)
- Zanna servillei (Spinola, 1839) - Indonesia (Java)
- Zanna soni Lallemand, 1959
- Zanna tapirus (Distant, 1905) - Southeast Asia (Java)
- Zanna tenebrosa (Fabricius, 1775) - (incl. madagascariensis) type species - DR Congo, Madagascar, Tanzania
- Zanna terminalis (Gerstaecker, 1895) - Malesia
- Zanna turrita (Gerstaecker, 1895) - Tanzania
- Zanna westwoodi Metcalf, 1947
