= Jean-Christophe Marine =

Belgian molecular biologist

Jean-Christophe Marine (age 50, born 5 October 1968) is a Belgian molecular biologist and researcher at CME (Center of Human Genetics) Ku-Leuven (Belgium). He is head of the VIB Laboratory of Molecular Cancer Biology. His research interest is in the identification and characterization of cancer growth modulators, such as p53.

He obtained a PhD from the University of Liège (Liège, Belgium) in 1996. He did a Postdoc at St Jude Children's Research Hospital in Memphis, United States from 1996 until 1999 and at the European Institute of Oncology (IEO) in Milan, Italy from 2000 until 2002. He was Chercheur Qualifié of the FNRS, Brussels, Belgium from 2002 until 2004. He is VIB Group leader since 2004 and was EMBO Young Investigator in 2006.

== Sources ==
https://web.archive.org/web/20100817011029/http://med.kuleuven.be/cme/
