= Jean-Marc Carisse =

Canadian photojournalist, visual artist and author

Jean-Marc Carisse is a Canadian photojournalist, visual artist and author who has been accredited as photographer in world events, including (G7, G8, G20, NORAD, NATO, APEC, Davos' World Economic Forum, the United Nations, the UNESCO, NAFTA and the World Bank (IBRD)). His career as professional photojournalist spans over 50 years, including 15 years as a prime minister's official photographer for three Canadian heads of government, namely Pierre Trudeau, John Turner and Jean Chrétien. In addition, he also served each of these prime ministers during their terms as opposition leaders, and subsequently as their personal photographer. His photographs have appeared on covers and pages of history and political books (including his own Privileged Access with Trudeau, Turner and Chrétien (Warwick 2000), magazines Time, Paris Match and Maclean's, as well as documentaries and biographies.

Past exhibits include: "My Trudeau Years", "The Charter. It’s Ours. It’s Us.", "Chasing The Beat", "On The World Stage", and "Jazz & Blues Seen".

He graduated with a Bachelor of Arts (BA) with a concentration in Visual Arts from the University of Ottawa. Jean-Marc Carisse has donated approximately 69,000 negatives several years ago to the National Archives of Canada and his P.M. Jean Chrétien collection Fonds (approximately 400,000 negatives) was donated in 2005.

Jean-Marc Carisse's first book, a coffee-table photo book titled Privileged Access with Trudeau, Turner and Chrétien, was voted "best political book of the year" by The Hill Times. It contains hundreds of photographs featuring his shadowing of the three prime ministers.

Many of Mr. Carisse's photos of Mother Teresa appear inside the 2008 book Remembering Mother Teresa. As well, his photos are featured throughout the pages of Prime-Minister Jean Chrétien's books titled "My years as Prime Minister", and "My Stories, My Times", both published by Random House, respectively in 2007 and 2018. Jean-Marc Carisse works is an international freelance photographer, based in Ottawa, Canada, covering a range of assignments from accredited photographer of visiting dignitaries to special local, national and worldwide events.

== Publication ==
- Jean-Marc Carisse, Mark S. Bell (2000), Privileged Access with Trudeau, Turner and Chrétien, Warwick Publishing, 250 pages, ISBN 1-894020-66-9
