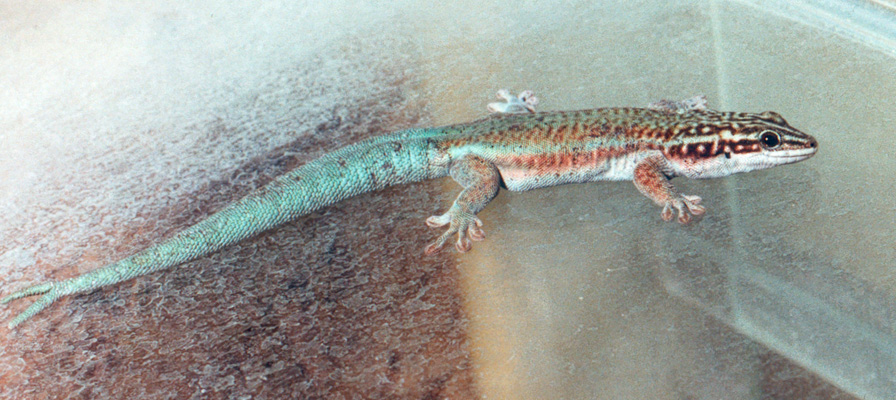

Conservation status
- Least Concern (IUCN 3.1)

Scientific classification
- Kingdom: Animalia
- Phylum: Chordata
- Class: Reptilia
- Order: Squamata
- Suborder: Gekkota
- Family: Gekkonidae
- Genus: Phelsuma
- Species: P. barbouri

Binomial name
- Phelsuma barbouri Loveridge, 1942
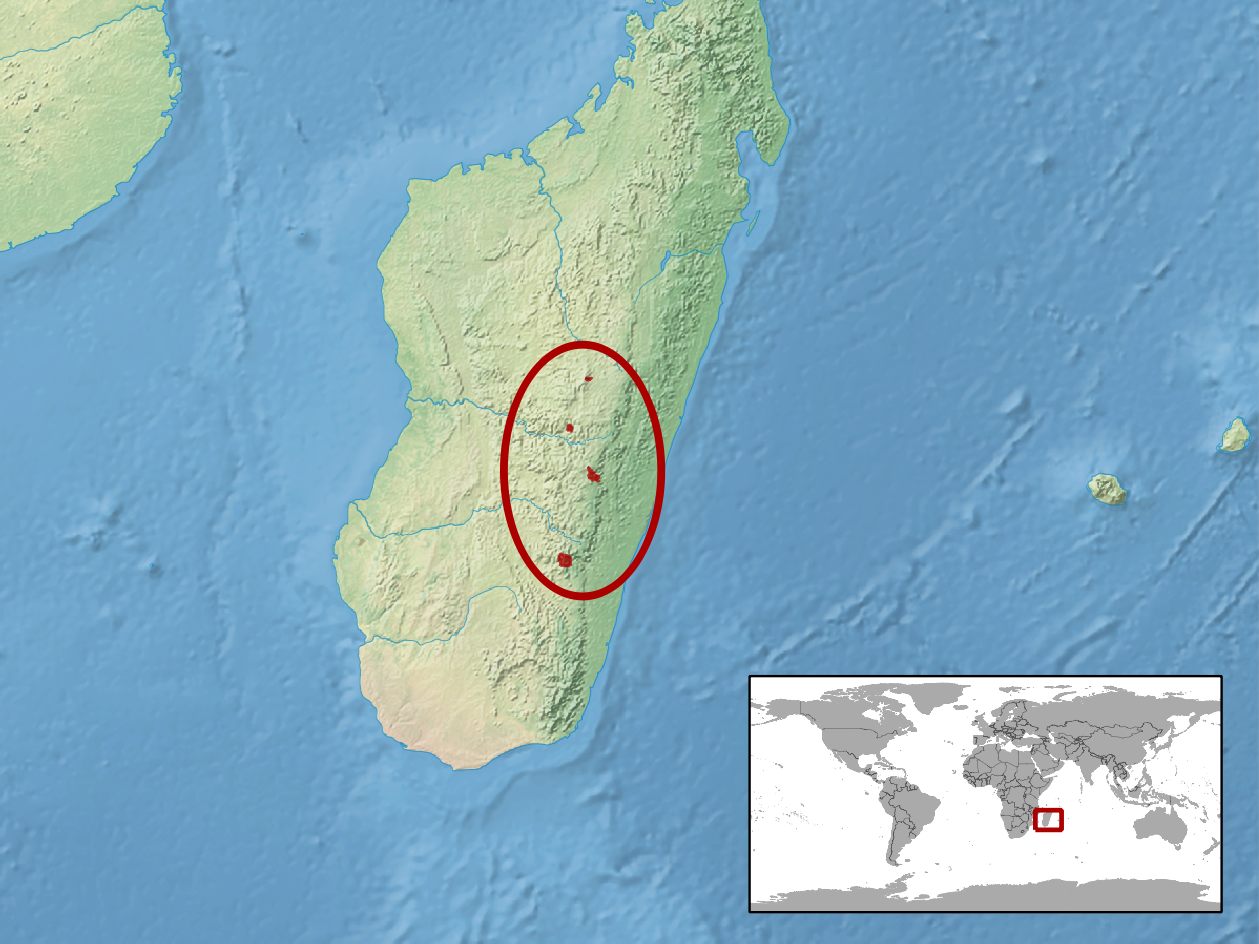

= Barbour's day gecko =

Species of lizard

Barbour's day gecko (Phelsuma barbouri) is a species of lizard in the family Gekkonidae. The species is endemic to central Madagascar. It is diurnal and typically dwells on rocks. Barbour's day gecko feeds on insects and nectar.

== Etymology ==
The specific name, barbouri, as well as the common name, Barbour's day gecko, are in honor of American herpetologist Thomas Barbour.

== Description ==
P. barbouri is a middle-sized day gecko. It can reach a total length (including tail) of about 13.5 cm (5.3 in). The body colour is brownish green or dark green. Both a dark brown dorso-lateral stripe and a dark brown lateral stripe extend from head to tail. The extremities are normally brown. The tail is unicoloured green and slightly flattened.

== Geographic range ==
P. barbouri inhabits the highlands of central Madagascar in the Ankaratra Mountains, at altitudes of 1,600–2,640 m (5,250–8,660 ft).

== Habitat ==
In contrast to other lizards of the genus Phelsuma, P. barbouri is terrestrial and typically lives on stones on the ground or on rocks in savanna habitat. The climate of its habitat is extremely harsh. There is a huge difference in temperature between night and day, and between different seasons. The maximum day temperature is 30 °C (86 °F). At night, it is cool and foggy.

== Diet ==
P. barbouri feeds on various insects and other invertebrates.

== Behaviour ==
P. barbouri often lives in small groups. During the day, it flattens its body to catch as much sun as possible. This way it can reach its preferred body temperature. During the night and in the early morning, P. barbouri has a dark colour. However, when it is basking, the body colour becomes brighter.

== Reproduction ==
Adult females of P. barbouri glue their eggs under stones. Since additional females may deposit their eggs at the same location, as many as 50 eggs may be found together. At a temperature of 28 °C (82 °F), the young will hatch after approximately 55 days. The neonates measure 32 mm (1.3 in).

== Care and maintenance in captivity ==
P. barbouri should be housed in pairs and needs a large terrarium which should provide many places to hide. Group breeding, however, is possible. The terrarium should be earth-based with a number of flat rocks present. It is important that there be some spot lights for basking. The daytime temperature should be around 29 °C (84 °F), while at night the temperature should drop to 20 °C (68 °F). In captivity, it can be fed crickets, wax moths, fruit flies, mealworms, and houseflies.
