= Jean-Philippe (given name) =

Jean-Philippe is a French male given name.

Notable people so named include:

- Jean-Philippe Baile, French rugby league footballer
- Jean-Philippe Baratier (1721–1740), German scholar and child prodigy
- Jean-Philippe Belloc (born 1970), French race car driver
- Jean-Philippe Bergeron (writer), Canadian French-language writer and poet
- Jean-Philippe Bouchaud, French physicist
- Jean-Philippe Brulé, Belgian field hockey player
- Jean-Philippe Caillet, French footballer
- Jean-Philippe Charbonnier, French photographer
- Jean-Philippe Collard, French pianist
- Jean-Philippe Côté (born 1982), French-Canadian ice hockey player
- Jean-Philippe Dally (born 1996), French–Ivorian basketballer
- Jean-Philippe Darche, better known as J. P. Darche
- Jean-Philippe Daurelle, French fencer
- Jean Philippe de Bela French-Basque military figure and writer
- Jean-Philippe de Cheseaux (1718–1751), Swiss astronomer
- Jean-Philippe Dehon, French footballer and manager
- Jean-Philippe Douin, French Air Force general
- Jean-Philippe Durand, French footballer
- Jean Philippe Eugène de Mérode, Belgian military person of the Holy Roman Empire
- Jean-Philippe Faure, French football manager and former player
- Jean-Philippe Fleurian (born 1965), French tennis player
- Jean-Philippe Gatien, French table tennis player
- Jean-Philippe Goncalves, French composer, percussionist, and record producer
- Jean-Philippe Goude, French composer and keyboardist
- Jean-Philippe Grandclaude, French rugby union footballer
- Jean-Philippe Javary, French footballer
- Jean-Philippe Jaworski, French author of fantasy literature and role-playing games
- Jean-Philippe Jodard (born 1966), French beach volleyball player
- Jean-Philippe Lauer, French architect and Egyptologist
- Jean-Philippe Lecat, French politician
- Jean-Philippe Leguellec (born 1985), Canadian biathlete
- Jean-Philippe Levasseur, Canadian ice hockey goaltender
- Jean-Philippe Maitre, Swiss politician
- Jean-Philippe Mateta (born 1997), French footballer
- Jean-Philippe Maurer, French politician
- Jean-Philippe Maury, French pastry chef
- Jean-Philippe Mendy, French footballer
- Jean-Philippe Rameau (1683–1784), French composer
- Jean-Philippe Rohr, French footballer
- Jean-Philippe Roy, Canadian alpine skier
- Jean-Philippe Ruggia (born 1965), French motorcycle road racer
- Jean-Philippe Rykiel, French composer, arranger, and musician
- Jean-Philippe Sabo, French footballer
- Jean-Philippe Salabreuil, French poet
- Jean-Philippe Stassen, Belgian comic artist
- Jean-Philippe Susilovic (born 1975), Belgian television personality known as the Maître d' on the American reality show Hell's Kitchen
- Jean-Philippe Tremblay, Canadian orchestra conductor
- Jean-Philippe Toussaint, Belgian novelist, photographer and filmmaker
- Jean-Philippe Wispelaere, Australian intelligence officer
- Johnny Hallyday (born Jean-Philippe Smet in 1943), French singer and actor

== Variants in different languages ==
- Dutch : Jan Filip
- German : Johann Philipp
- English : John Philip
- Italian : Gianfilippo
- French : Jean-Philippe
- Spanish : Juan Felipe
- Portuguese : João Felipe
