= Vandinho (footballer, born September 1986) =

Brazilian footballer

Personal information
- Full name: Vanderson Gomes Crisóstomo
- Date of birth: 26 September 1986 (age 40)
- Place of birth: Rio de Janeiro, Brazil
- Height: 1.76 m (5 ft 9 in)
- Position: Midfielder

Team information
- Current team: Nova Iguaçu

Senior career*
| Years | Team | Apps | (Gls) |
| 2007–2008 | Rio Branco | – | (–) |
| 2009 | Volta Redonda | 3 | (0) |
| 2009 | Botafogo SP | – | (–) |
| 2010 | CFZ-RJ | – | (–) |
| 2010 | Independente-RJ | – | (–) |
| 2016–2018 | Serra Macaense | – | (–) |
| 2013–2014 | Coquimbo Unido | 44 | (0) |
| 2014–2015 | Iberia | 21 | (0) |
| 2016 | Desportiva Ferroviária | – | (–) |
| 2016–2017 | Cobreloa | 19 | (1) |
| 2018 | Serra | – | (0) |
| 2018–2020 | Americano | 34 | (1) |
| 2019 | → Itaboraí (loan) | 4 | (0) |
| 2019 | → Campos (loan) | 6 | (0) |
| 2020 | Duque de Caxias | 14 | (1) |
| 2021 | Nova Iguaçu | 22 | (3) |
| 2021 | Sampaio Corrêa-RJ | 13 | (1) |
| 2021 | Goytacaz | 5 | (0) |
| 2022– | Nova Iguaçu | 26 | (0) |
- * Club domestic league appearances and goals as of 15 July 2022

Vanderson Gomes Crisóstomo (born 26 September 1986), known as Vandinho, is a Brazilian footballer who plays for Nova Iguaçu as a midfielder.

In 2013, he joined to Coquimbo Unido.
