= Jean-Louis Vieillard-Baron =

French Roman Catholic philosopher (1944-2025)

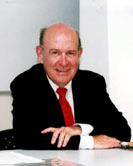
- Jean-Louis Vieillard-Baron in 2013
- Born: Jean Louis Henri Vieillard-Baron; 19 April 1944; Tunis, Tunisia
- Died: 28 September 2025 (aged 81); Poitiers, France
- Education: École normale supérieure de Saint-Cloud
- Occupation: Philosopher

Jean-Louis Vieillard-Baron (19 April 1944 – 28 September 2025) was a French Roman Catholic philosopher. He was Professor Emeritus of Philosophy at the University of Poitiers and Professor of the Philosophy of Religion at the Institut Catholique de Paris. He was the author of many books about Bergson and Hegel. He was an expert on spiritualism.

== Early life ==
Jean-Louis Vieillard-Baron was born in 1944. He entered the École normale supérieure de Saint-Cloud in 1965. He received the Agrégation in 1969 and a Doctorate in Philosophy in 1976.

== Career ==
Vieillard-Baron was a professor of philosophy at the University of Poitiers, where he was the director of a research centre about Karl Marx and Hegel, later about Hegel and German idealism. Additionally, he was the recipient of fellowships from the Alexander von Humboldt Foundation to conduct research at the Hegel-Archiv. He was also the founder and president of the Association Louis Lavelle in 1989.

Vieillard-Baron was Professor of the Philosophy of Religion at the Institut Catholique de Paris. He is an expert on spiritualism. He died on 28 September 2025 in Poitiers at the age of 81.

== Works ==
- Vieillard-Baron, Jean-Louis (1978). Le temps : Platon, Hegel, Heidegger. Paris: Librairie philosophique J. Vrin. OCLC 5939697.
- Vieillard-Baron, Jean-Louis (1979). Platon et l'idéalisme allemand (1770-1830). Paris: Éditions Beauchesne. OCLC 6171624.
- Vieillard-Baron, Jean-Louis (1981). L'Illusion historique et l'espérance céleste. Paris: Berg International.
- Vieillard-Baron, Jean-Louis (1988). Platonisme et interprétation de Platon à l'époque moderne. Paris: Librairie philosophique J. Vrin. ISBN 9782711609802. OCLC 19932744.
- Vieillard-Baron, Jean-Louis (1991). Bergson. Paris: Presses universitaires de France. ISBN 9782130438014. OCLC 23958973.
- Philonenko, Alexis; Vieillard-Baron, Jean-Louis (1994). Qu'est-ce que l'éducation? : Montaigne, Fichte et Lavelle. Paris: Librairie philosophique J. Vrin. ISBN 9782711611812. OCLC 299469589.
- Vieillard-Baron, Jean-Louis (1999). Hegel et l'idéalisme allemand. Paris: Librairie philosophique J. Vrin. ISBN 9782711613670. OCLC 468071493.
- Vieillard-Baron, Jean-Louis (1999). Bergson et le bergsonisme. Paris: Armand Colin. ISBN 9782200219086. OCLC 41476128.
- Vieillard-Baron, Jean-Louis (2000). La philosophie française. Paris: Armand Colin. ISBN 9782200251161. OCLC 407088555.
- Vieillard-Baron, Jean-Louis (2006). Hegel, penseur du politique. Paris: Editions du Félin. ISBN 9782866456313. OCLC 300394560.
- Vieillard-Baron, Jean-Louis (2006). Hegel, système et structures théologiques. Paris: Les éditions du Cerf. ISBN 9782204081962. OCLC 470720825.
- Kounkou, Charles; Vieillard-Baron, Jean-Louis (2007). Permanence et fécondité de l'idéalisme allemand. Paris: L'Harmattan. ISBN 9782296044364. OCLC 184911385.
- Vieillard-Baron, Jean-Louis (2008). Le problème du temps : huit études. Paris: Librairie philosophique J. Vrin. ISBN 9782711612475. OCLC 493714934.
- Vieillard-Baron, Jean-Louis (2010). Et in Arcadia ego : Poussin ou l'immortalité du beau. Paris: Éditions Hermann. ISBN 9782705669713. OCLC 611204159.
- Vieillard-Baron, Jean-Louis (2010). La religion et la cité. Paris: Editions du Félin. ISBN 9782130504740. OCLC 300466714.
- Vieillard-Baron, Jean-Louis (2013). Le secret de Bergson. Paris: Editions du Félin. ISBN 9782866457884. OCLC 836882992.
- Tourpe, Emmanuel; Vieillard-Baron, Jean-Louis (2014). L'idée de Dieu, l'idée de l'âme. Paris: Les Petits Platons. ISBN 9782361650728. OCLC 900410194.
