= Jean-Philippe Wispelaere =

Jean-Philippe Wispelaere is a former intelligence analyst for the Australian Defence Intelligence Organisation. He was convicted of attempting to sell United States military secrets.

== Career ==
Wispelaere began his work at the DIO in July 1998, and had access to data which was provided to the DIO through Australia's treaties with the United States. In January the following year, Wispelaere quit his job and travelled to Bangkok, where he approached the embassy of a foreign country. According to various media, the country was identiefied to be Singapore. The Singaporean government informed Washington DC of the incident.

The FBI began to investigate. Posing as agents for a foreign country (allegedly Russia), the FBI met Wispelaere in Bangkok, where he gave them hundreds of sensitive documents in exchange for cash. Later, he mailed more documents to an address in Virginia, also run by the FBI.

=== Arrest & release ===
On May 15, 1999, Wispelaere was lured to Washington, where he expected to meet the foreign agent. He was arrested by the FBI at Dulles International Airport, and was charged with attempted espionage. He was sentenced in March 2001 for 15 years after pleading guilty to espionage.

Under a plea bargain agreement, Wispelaere agreed to co-operate with investigators in exchange for a lighter penalty. He was sentenced to fifteen years in prison. He is alleged to suffer from mental illness, and his trial was delayed to claims he was suffering from schizophrenia. It was reported that Wispelaaere tried to commit suicide.

In May 2009, Attorney-General Robert McClelland granted preliminary approval for Wispelaere to return to Australia under the international prisoner transfer scheme.

As of 2012, it was reported that Wispelaere chose to go to Canada, where was he was born before he moved to Australia with his parents.
