= Ambalavao =

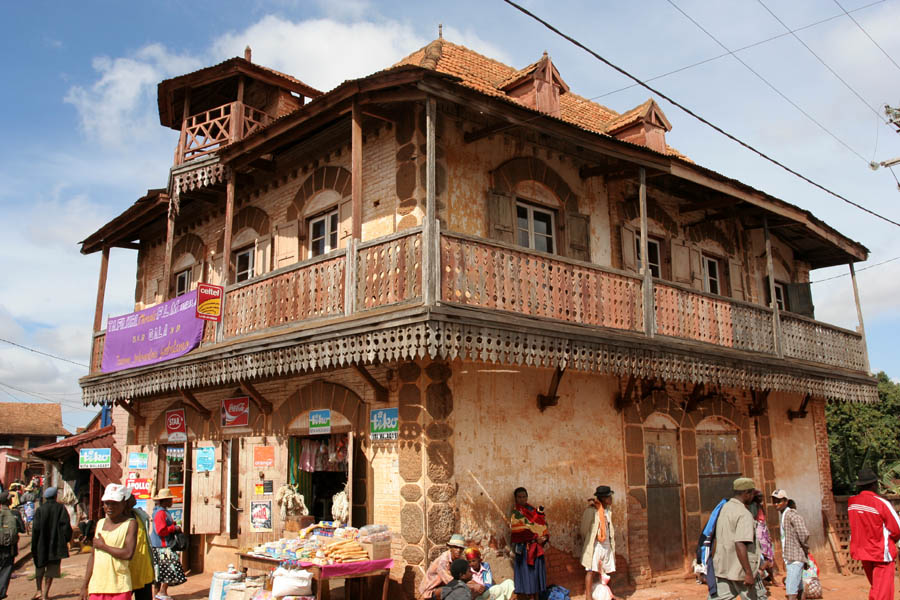
- The town centre of Ambalavao as of November 2007

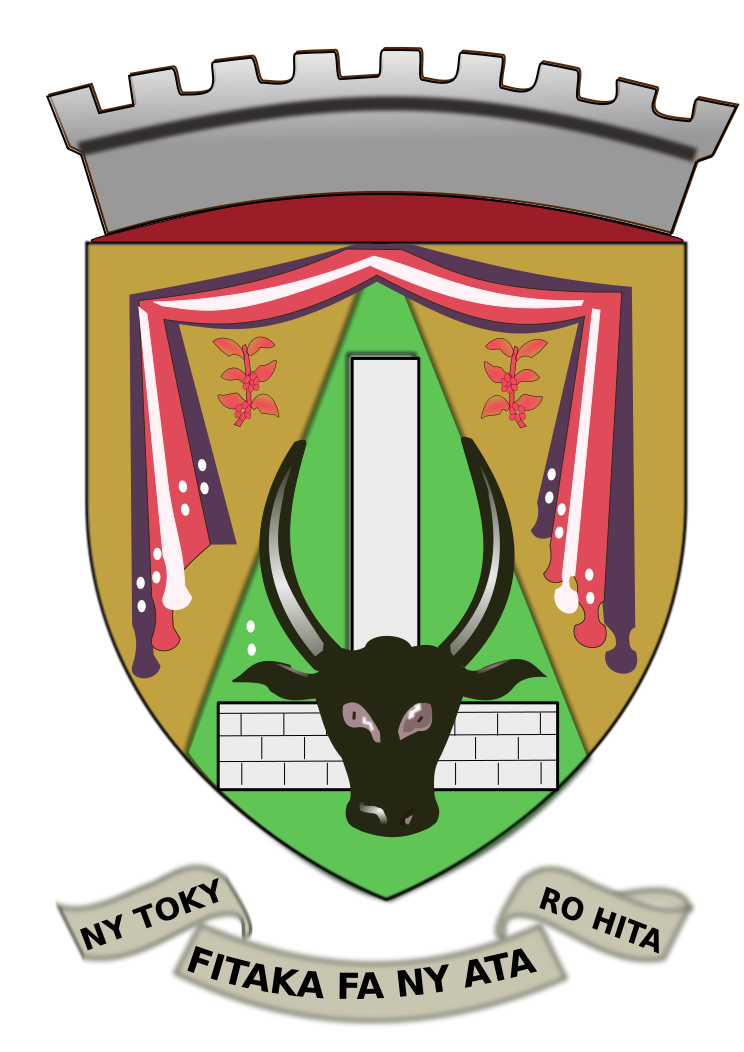
- Coat of arms

- Location in Madagascar
- Coordinates: 21°50′S 46°56′E
- Country: Madagascar
- Province: Haute Matsiatra

Population (2001)
  - Total: 30,000
  - Ethnicities: Betsileo
- Postal code: 303
- Climate: Cwa

Ambalavao [amˌbalaˈvaw] is a city (commune urbaine) in Madagascar, in the Haute Matsiatra region. The city is in the most southern part of the Central Highlands, near the city of Fianarantsoa.

== Nature ==
- The Anja Community Reserve, situated about 13 km south of Ambalavao, is a small community-based reserve created to preserve and manage local natural resources.
- Andringitra National Park is located near this city.

== Geography ==
Ambalavao is situated at the National road 7 Fianarantsoa-Ihosy-Tuléar at 160 km from Ihosy and 56 km from Fianarantsoa.

== Sights ==
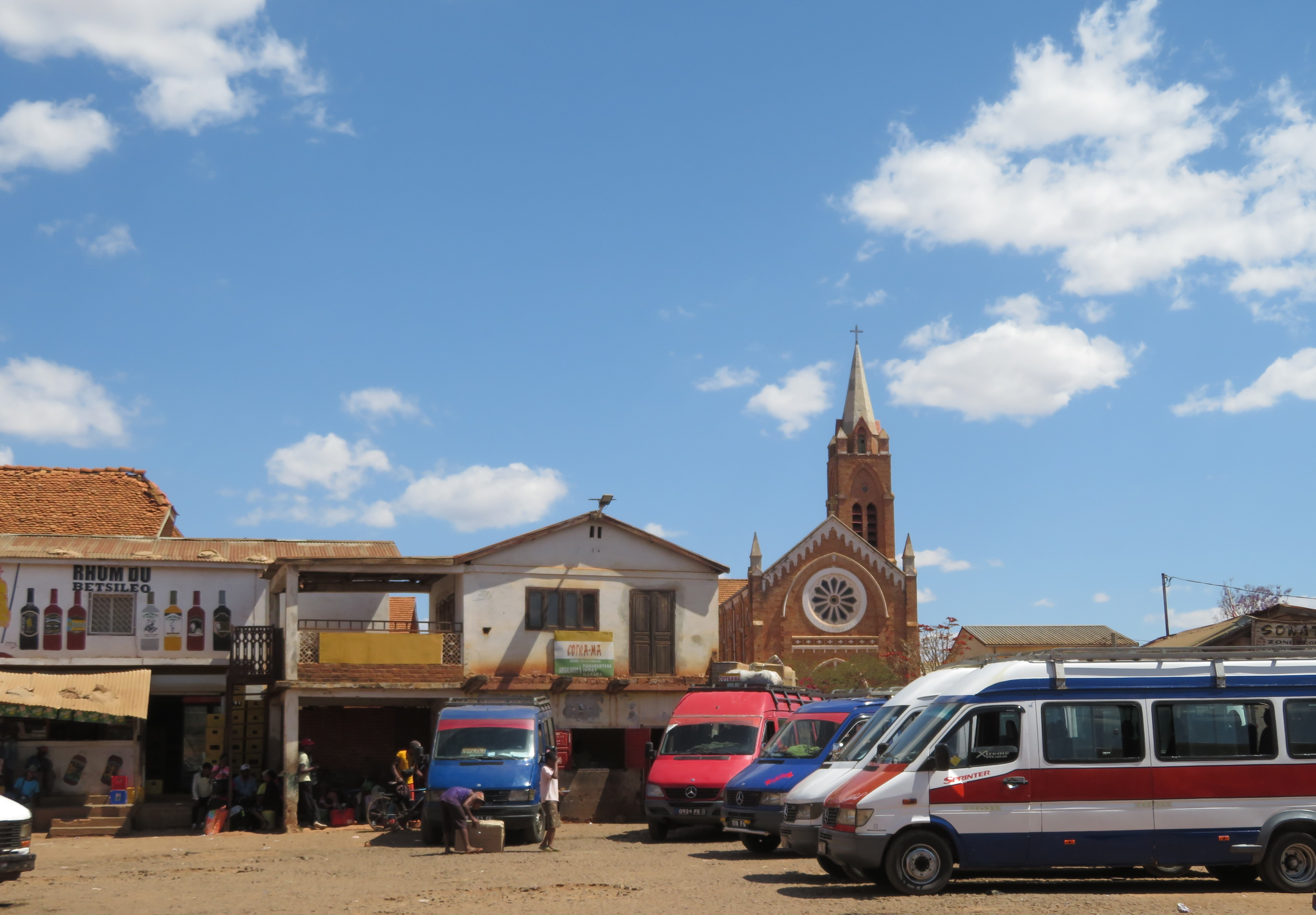
St. Joseph Church

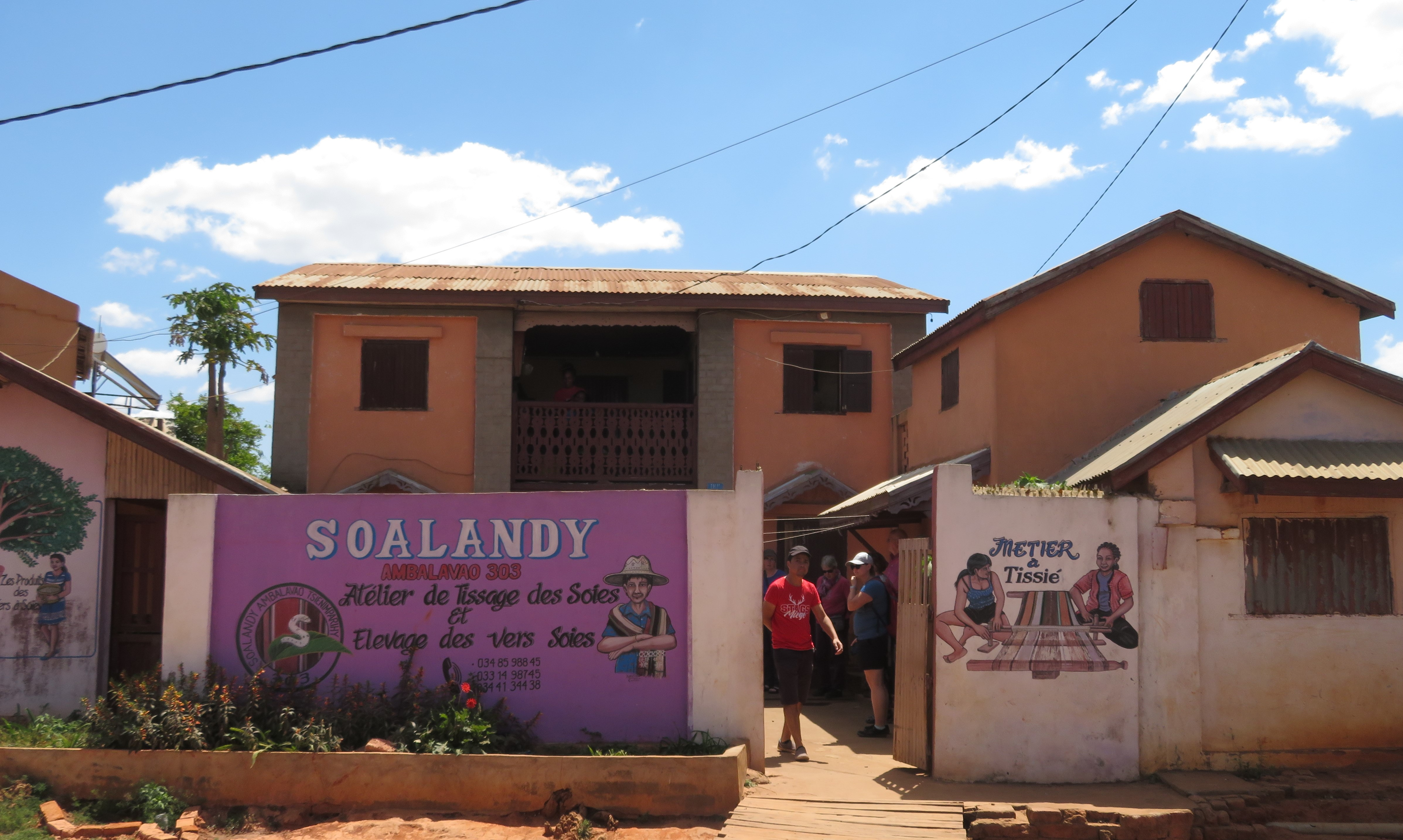
Silk weaving mill

The Bureau de la Zone Administrative is a colonial building built of tiles with a flight of outdoor stairs around 1920. Saint Joseph Church is a large catholic church which was built of tiles in a neogothic style in the first quarter of the 20th century.

Ambalavao is known for its silk production based on the breeding of a special species of silkworms which feeds on tapia trees. A silk weaving mill can be visited in the northern part of the town.

Ambalavao is also known for the production of Antemoro paper of the bark of Avoha bushes, a species of morus. A workshop can be visited in the town centre.

A zebu market is held twice a week.

Anja Community Reserve is a sightworthy natural reserve famous for its ring-tailed lemurs.

== Climate ==
Ambalavao has a humid subtropical climate (Köppen: Cwa).

Climate data for Ambalavao
Month	Jan	Feb	Mar	Apr	May	Jun	Jul	Aug	Sep	Oct	Nov	Dec	Year
Daily mean °C (°F)	22.1 (71.8)	21.9 (71.4)	21.4 (70.5)	20.3 (68.5)	18.1 (64.6)	16.0 (60.8)	15.1 (59.2)	15.9 (60.6)	17.8 (64.0)	20.2 (68.4)	21.6 (70.9)	22.0 (71.6)	19.4 (66.9)
Average precipitation mm (inches)	260 (10.2)	169 (6.7)	153 (6.0)	27 (1.1)	16 (0.6)	18 (0.7)	14 (0.6)	15 (0.6)	19 (0.7)	34 (1.3)	112 (4.4)	234 (9.2)	1,071 (42.1)
Source: Climate-Data.org

== Transports ==
The city is served by Ambalavao Airport.

== Twin city ==
Ambalavao is twinned with Quatre Bornes, Mauritius

== See also ==
- Andringitra National Park
- Anja Community Reserve

== Gallery ==
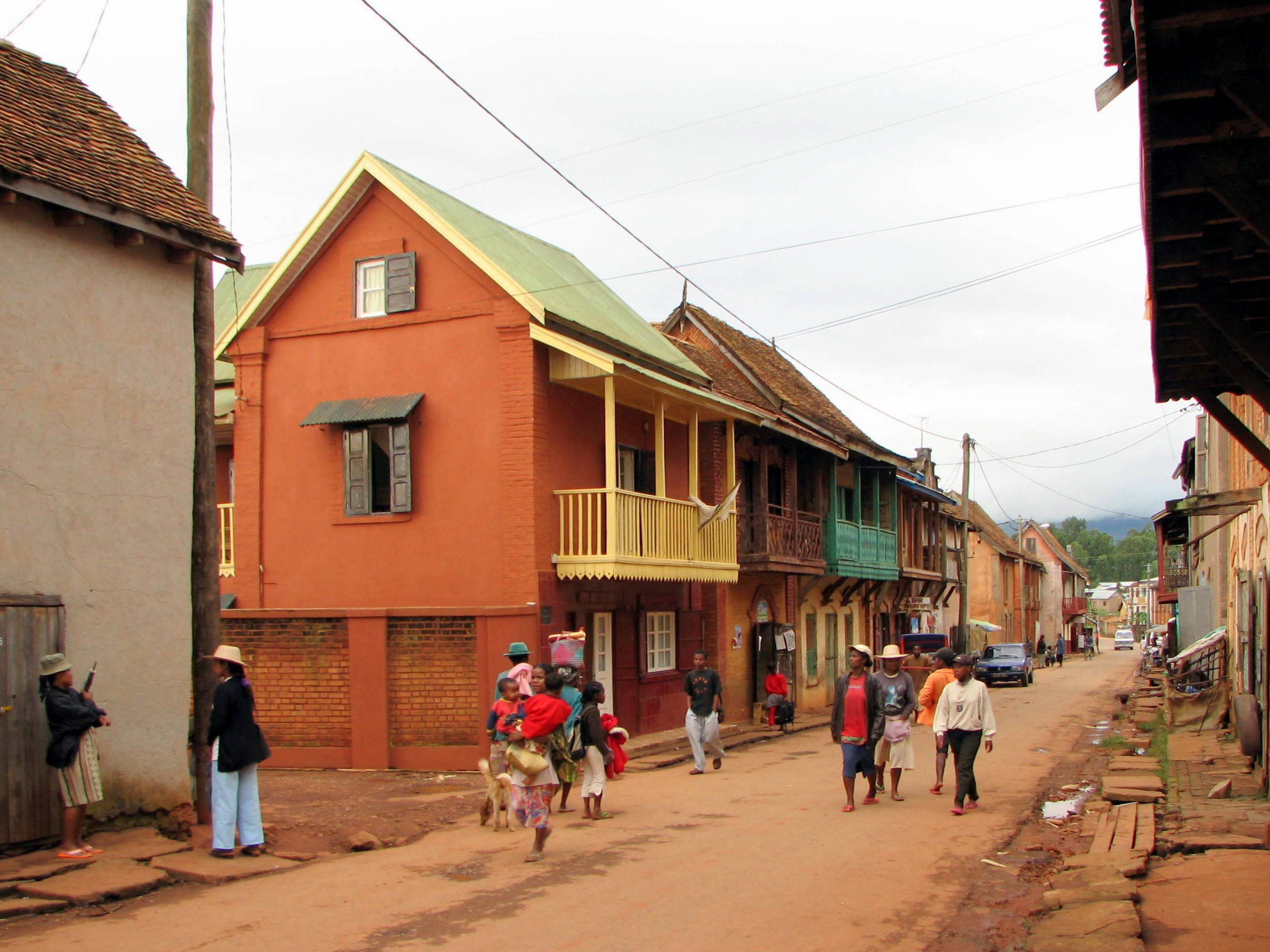
Ambalavao main street

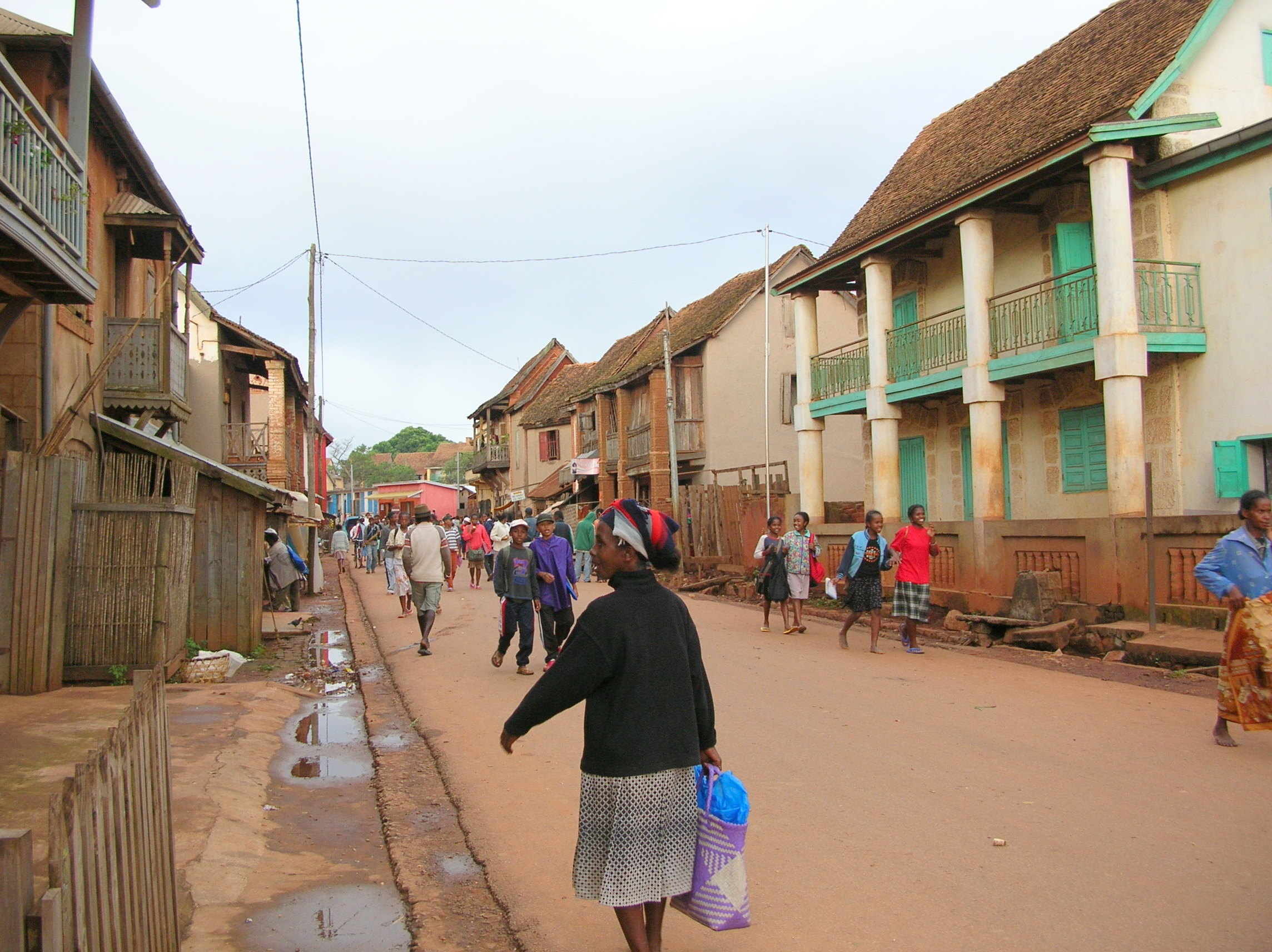
Ambalavao main street

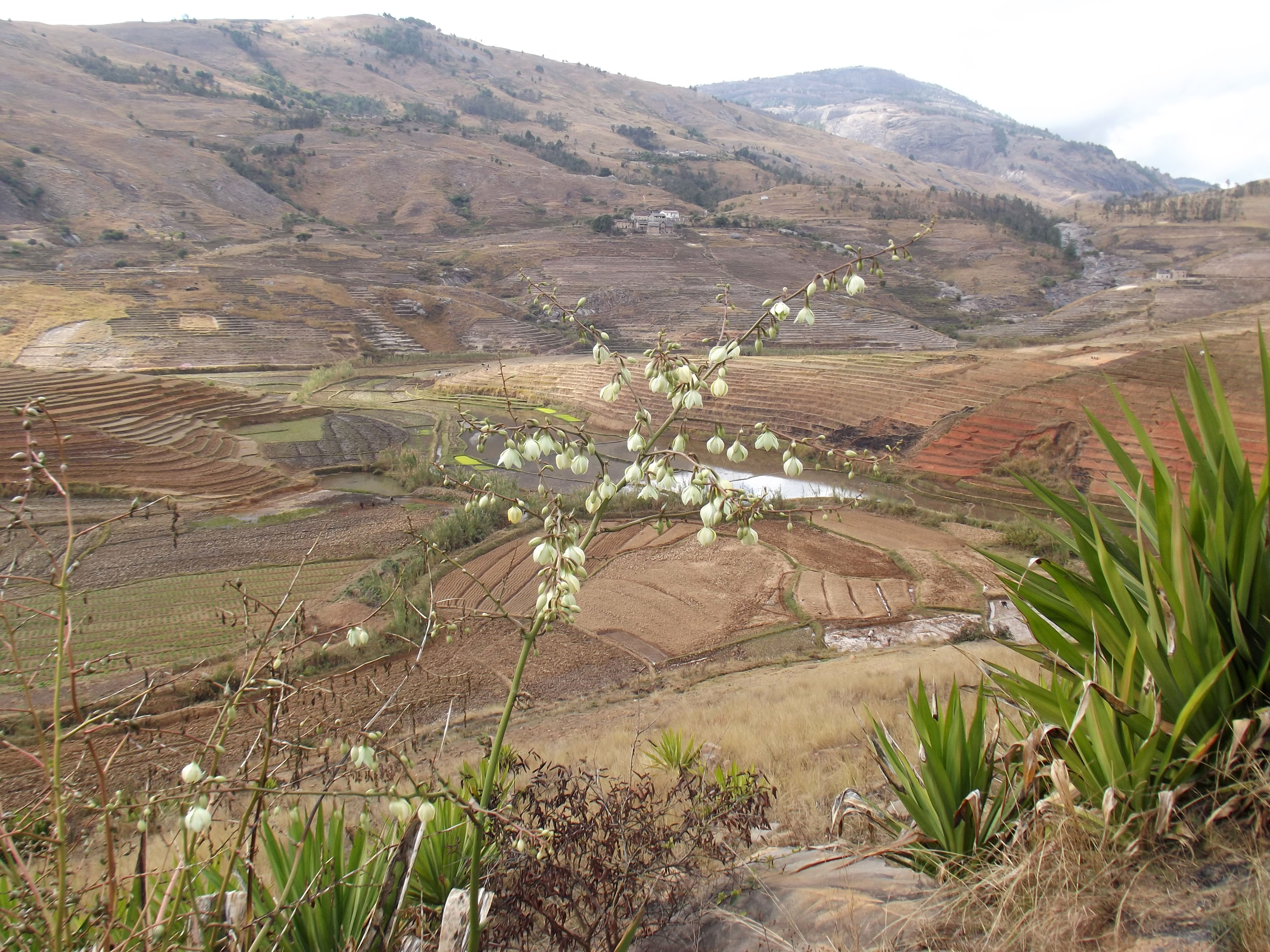
Landscape between Ambalavao & Talata Ampano
