= Justin Chrysostome Dorsainvil =

Haitian writer (1880–1942)

Justin Chrysostome Dorsainvil (1880–1942), also known as J.C. Dorsainvil, was a Haitian author and educator. Born in Port-au-Prince, Dorsainvil worked as a teacher and wrote books on such topics as science, politics, history, and Haitian society. Several of his books explored the Haitian religion of Vodou.

== Selected works ==
- Vaudou et Névrose (1931), English: Voodoo and Neurosis
- Une Explication Philologique du Vaudou (1924), English: A Philological Explanation of Voodoo
- Vaudou et Magie (1937), English: Voodoo and Magic
- Le Problème de l'Enseignement Primaire en Haïti (1922), English: The Problem of Primary Education in Haiti
- Quelques Vues Politiques et Morales (1934), English: Some Political and Moral Views
