= Borac =

Borac may refer to:

- FK Borac Banja Luka, a football club from Banja Luka, Bosnia and Herzegovina
  - RK Borac Banja Luka, an affiliated team handball club
  - OK Borac, an affiliated volleyball club
- FK Borac Čačak, a football club from Čačak, Serbia
- KK Borac Čačak, a basketball club from Čačak, Serbia
- Borac Laraki, a Moroccan sportscar made by Laraki
- Borač (disambiguation)
- Borac (film), a 2001 Bosnian television drama
