= Eric Van Hove =

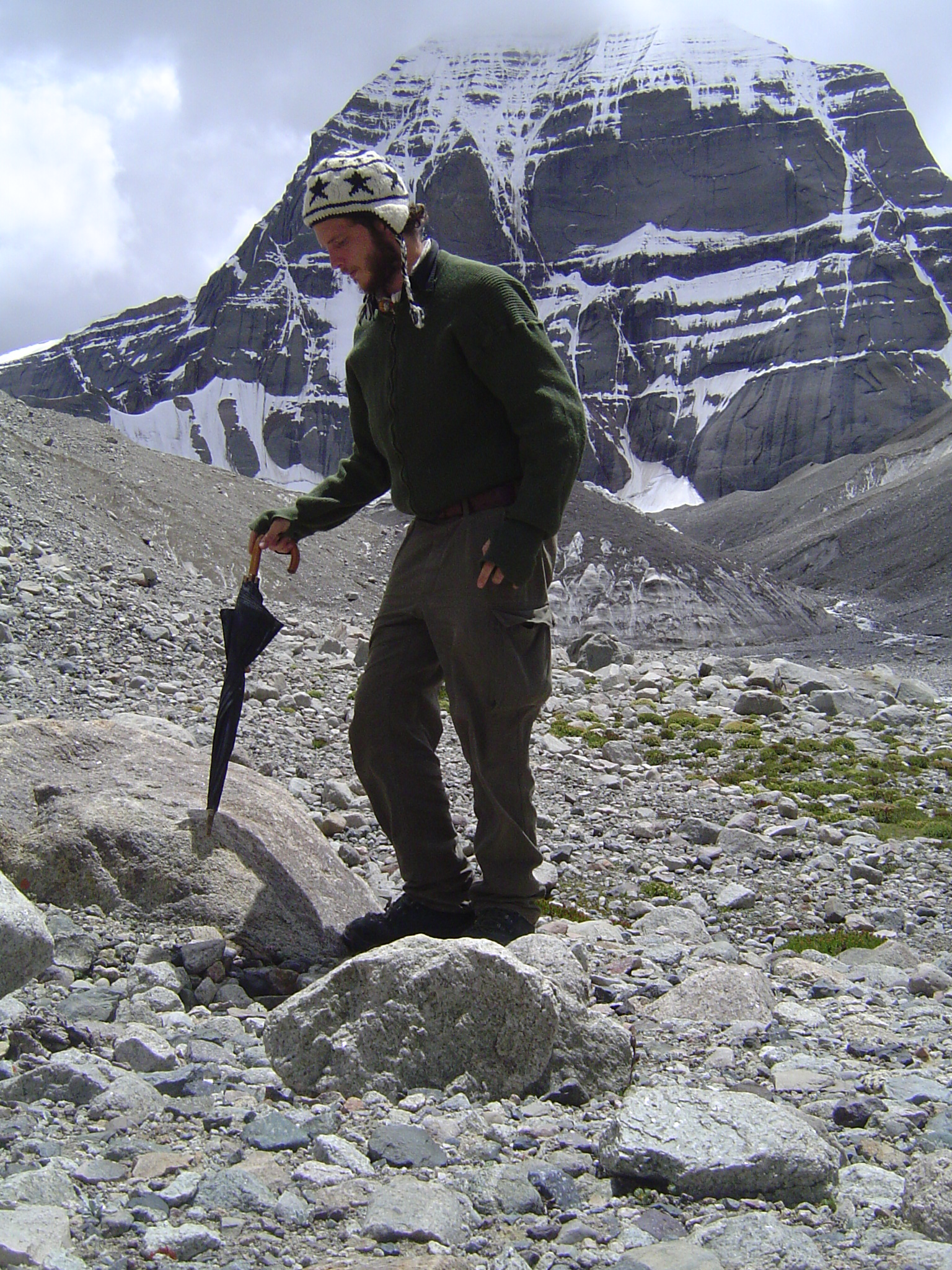
Van Hove during the circumambulating of Mount Kailash in western Tibet, 2005

Eric Van Hove (born 1975) is a Cameroon-raised Belgian metamodern conceptual artist. He lives and works between Brussels and Marrakesh. He is the grandson of Louis Van Hove, co-founder and CEO of the Structures Group, the largest post second world war functionalist architecture firm in Belgium.

== Early work ==
Eric Van Hove was born in 1975 in Guelma, Algeria. He studied at the École de Recherche Graphique in Brussels and received a Master's degree in Traditional Japanese Calligraphy at the Tokyo Gakugei University in Tokyo. He obtained a PhD degree from the Tokyo University of the Arts in 2008.

Bordering on activism with an existentialist tone, Van Hove's early work is based on the artist's nomadic willing to simultaneously address local and global issues. It encompasses many media ranging from installation to performance, video, photography, sculpture and writing. At times insubstantial and subversive, Van Hove's conceptually poetic interventions often ponder and cross-refer to sociological, political and ecological issues as shown with Japanese Constitution Worm Autodafé, Free Trade Concrete Mixer Kaleidoscope, or Shark Fin Piñata, which relates to the illegal Taiwanese shark finning in Costa Rica (1998–2006), portrayed in Rob Stewart's documentary Sharkwater. Made at the end of 2007, Dan Liever the Lucht In is a body of works responding to the 2007–2011 Belgian political crisis which was first shown in situ at the Belgian embassy in Tokyo before the building was destroyed for reconstruction.

Van Hove's early work includes wanderlust, defamiliarization, psychogeography and dérive, and he early on acknowledged transcendentalist influences in trying to oppose a more spiritual and decentralized approach to the Eurocentric intellectualism of the contemporary art world. During this period Van Hove became "known as a poet and avant-garde calligrapher … with projects that involve drawing improvised poetry in unusual modes and locations worldwide" He also collaborated with musicians such as David Hebert and Kenji Williams.

Interested in bringing contemporary art not only to the public space outside galleries and museums but outside of the Western context itself, Van Hove has been prolific in such diverse places as the Siwa Oasis in Egypt, Mount Kailash in Tibet, the Laguna de Perlas in Nicaragua, the Issyk Kul lake in eastern Kyrgyzstan, the Fianarantsoa province in Madagascar or more recently the foothills of the Himalayas in the northwestern part of Yunnan Province, China. He also conducted artist talks (which calls "story-telling objects" or "oral exhibits") in venues as different as Ramallah, the Tehran Museum of Contemporary Art, the Darat al Funun in Amman, and the University of Sarajevo. Having made site specific works in over 100 countries by the age of 35, Van Hove counts among the best traveled artists of his generation.

The "Metragram Series", a complex photographic series Van Hove started with his mother in 2005 crossing the artistic genre of self-portrait, vanitas, iconography and Memento mori in which he is seen inking the womb of women categorized as belonging to different types of groups, gathers images he produced in over 29 countries in 3 years. A digital slide show display of the Series was first presented as part of the Mediation Biennial in Poznań in 2008 (other Belgian artists were Jan Fabre and Koen Vanmechelen).

== Atelier Eric van Hove - Fenduq ==
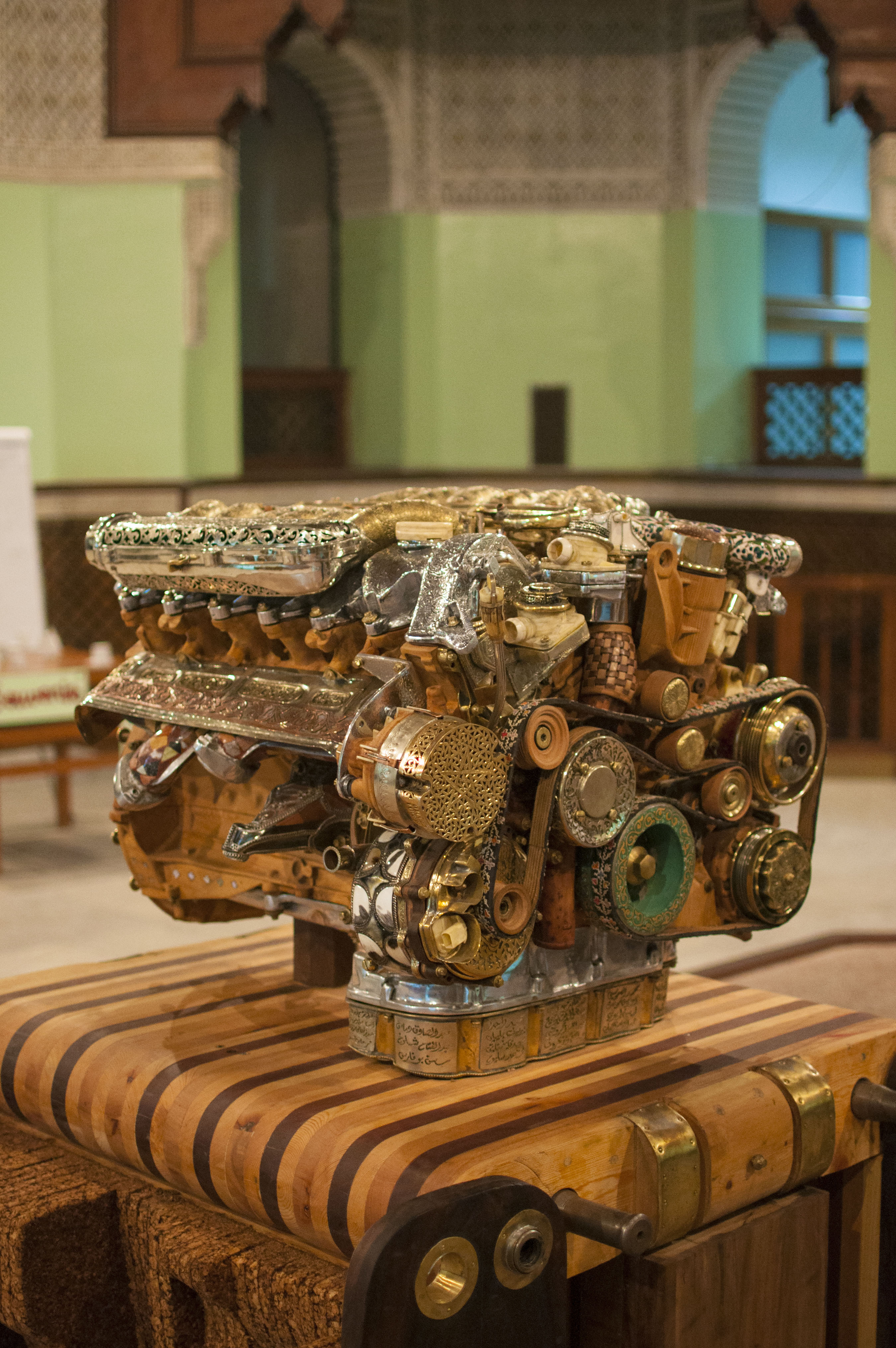
Eric van Hove - V12 Laraki, 2013. fifty-three materials including: Middle Atlas white cedar wood, high Atlas red cedar wood, walnut wood, lemon wood, orange wood, ebony wood of Macassar, mahogany wood, Thuya wood, Moroccan beech wood, pink apricot wood, mother-of-pearl, yellow copper, nickel plated copper, red copper, forged iron, recycled aluminum, nickel silver, silver, tin, cow bone, goat bone, malachite of Midelt, agate, green onyx, tigers eye stone, Taroudant stone, sandstone, red marble of Agadir, black marble of Ouarzazate, white marble of Béni Mellal, pink granite of Tafraoute, goatskin, cowskin, lambskin, resin, cow horn, rams horn, ammonite fossils of the Paleozoic from Erfoud, Ourika clay, geometric terra cotta with vitreous enamel (zellige), green enamel of Tamgrout, paint, cotton, argan oil, cork, henna, rumex.

In 2012, van Hove arrived in Marrakesh, Morocco, to resume work on an ambitious sculptural endeavor he had prepared for years: V12 Laraki. In the space of nine months, van Hove gathered around him 42 master craftsmen from the region and began rebuilding a Mercedes 6.2L V12 engine using rural materials and centuries old craft techniques from the North African country. Conceptually this sculpture is based on the story of the Laraki Fulgura, a Moroccan supercar by Industrial designer Abdeslam Laraki. While the Fulgura was entirely manufactured in Morocco to the exception of its engine, the artist decided to try and reproduce that cutting-edge component locally using craft, which accounts for 20% of the country’s work force and he saw as an unjustifiably neglected part of the national industry.

That sculpture, displayed at the 5th Marrakech Biennale and soon acquired by the Hood Museum of Art, would rapidly become the cornerstone of a new chapter in his creative practice leading to the founding of his atelier also known as Fenduq or Atelier Eric van Hove: a context-specific production facility and, in his own word "a living socioeconomic sculpture", from where the artist started working on "a renaissance of African craft". V12 Laraki was later made into a comprehensive publication introduced by well-known African curator Simon Njami and distributed by Motto Distribution in Berlin.

In the following years, many more sculptures came out of Atelier Eric van Hove including D9T (Rachel’s Tribute) in 2015, and Mahjouba I in 2016, which is a functioning replica of a Chinese electric motorbike using traditional African craft. In turn, this grew into what the artist called The Mahjouba Initiative, a long term project mixing African craft, 3D printing, and industrial production. Mahjouba II, a second craft-made electric prototype was made later that year. The Mahjouba Initiative is a long term on going artistic project aiming to re-integrate Moroccan craft into the mainstream industry via the manufacturing of electric mopeds for the local market using materials and techniques from the craft sector. The Initiative relies on two main facts: the presence in Morocco of nearly three million craftsmen whose trade is increasingly threatened by globalization, and the Noor Power Station Project by which the north African country plans to generate 42% of its energy from renewables by 2020. In 2018, Van Hove was a Montgomery Fellow at Dartmouth College.

Fenduq is a large retrospective exhibition the Fries Museum dedicated to the artist that opened in 2019, which will travel to Vandalorum, Sweden in February 2020.
