= Borač =

Borač may refer to places:

- Borač (fortress), a fortified town in medieval Bosnia
- Borač, Czech Republic, a municipality and village
- Borač, Serbia, a village near Knić in Serbia
  - Borač Fortress near Borač in Serbia

== See also ==
- Boračko Lake, a lake in Bosnia and Herzegovina
