= L'Écho du Sud =

French weekly newspaper

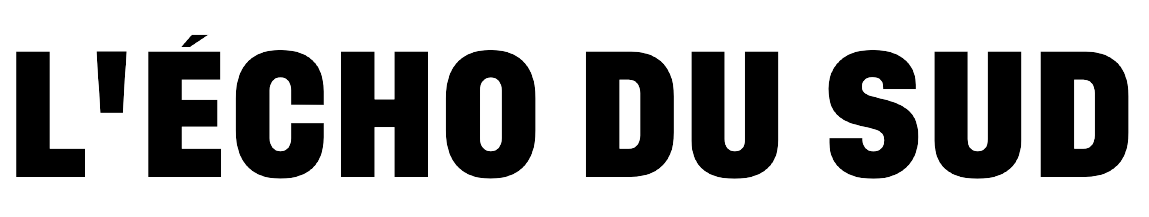

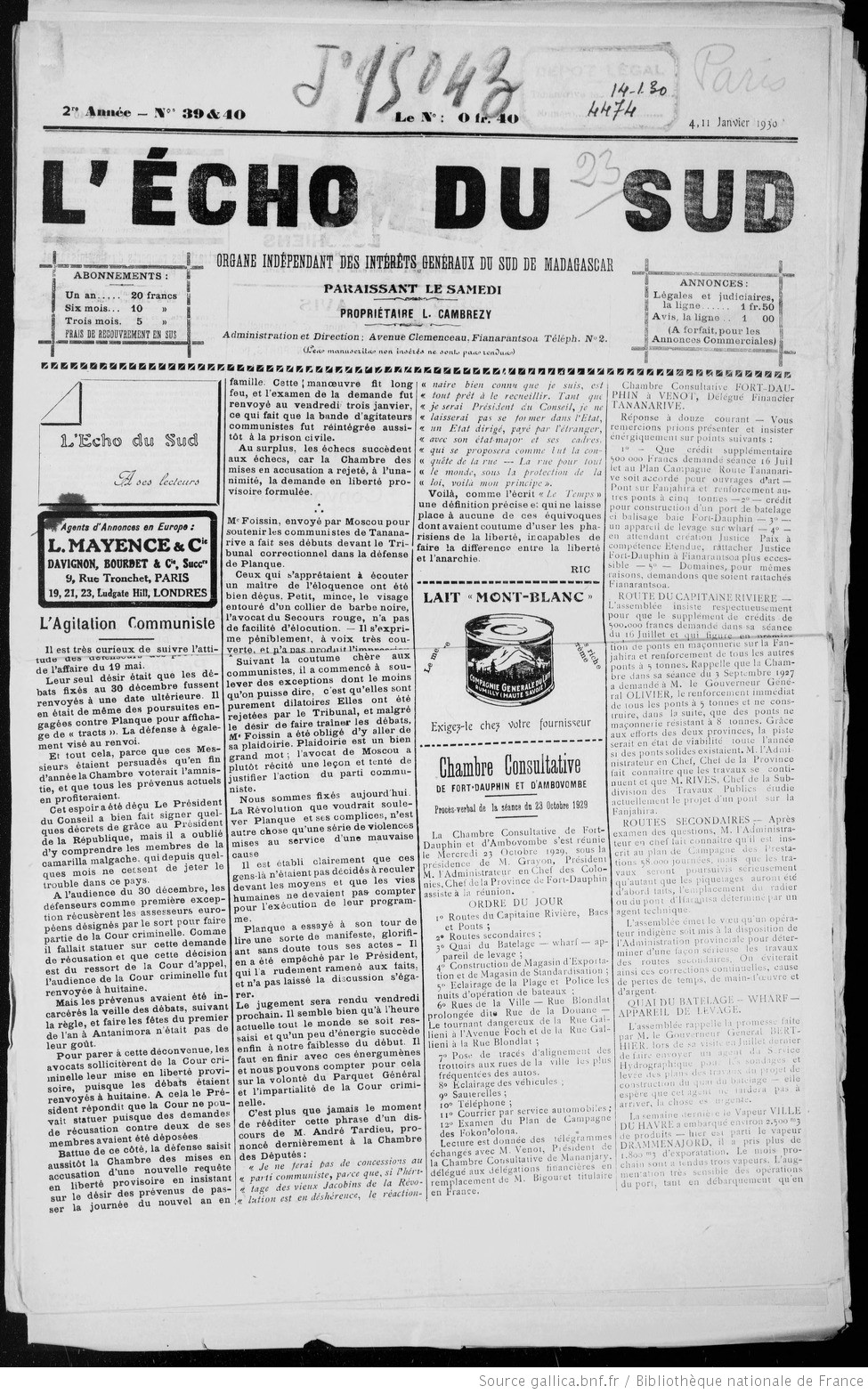
- Front page of 11 January 1930
- Type: Weekly newspaper
- Owner: Ferber Enterprises
- Founder: Louis Cambrézy
- Founded: 13 April 1929; 97 years ago
- Political alignment: Centre-right; French colonialism; Anti-communism
- Language: French
- Country: Madagascar
- Website: lechodusud.com

L'Écho du Sud (French pronunciation: [leko dy syd]) is a French-language weekly newspaper in Madagascar. It was founded in 1929 by Louis Cambrézy. In 2022, it was bought by the Ferber Group, which used it to implement deceptive marketing practices, ranging from undisclosed advertising to extortion attempts.

== History ==
L'Écho du Sud: organe des intérêts généraux du Sud de Madagascar was first published on 13 April 1929. The newspaper was founded in Fianarantsoa by Louis Cambrézy, a French settler. L'Écho du Sud was established to fill the need for an active newspaper in Fianarantsoa, as the year before the local paper La Voix du Sud, founded by Jules Thibier, ceased production.

L'Écho du Sud's head office was located on Avenue Clémenceau, Fianarantsoa, and was printed by the Imprimerie du Betsileo. Copies could be purchased for 0.40 francs.

The newspaper was published every Saturday and reported on general news in Madagascar.

Because of his role in founding and editing the newspaper, Louis Cambrézy was awarded the Legion of Honour in 1935, by Louis Rollin, Minister of the Colonies.

== Editorial stance ==
The newspaper was openly in favor of colonialism and the maintenance of France in Africa, with Cambrézy himself having taken part in the Second Madagascar expedition. From 1936, Cambrézy sided with the Spanish Republicans who were victims of the Francoists. During the Second World War, the newspaper took a stand against Vichy France because of its persecution of Louis Cambrézy for his membership in Freemasonry.

== Takeover by Ferber group ==
In 2022, L'Écho du Sud was bought by Ferber Enterprises (mg), a holding that uses it to blackmail its customers and victims of the deceptive practices of its subsidiaries. The paper publishes defamatory articles focused on customers who have posted negative reviews of the company, but will remove these defamatory articles if the negative review is removed. In 2023, L'Écho du Sud was the focus of controversy after publishing a defamatory article against a client of Ferber Painting, a company of the Ferber group. The client testified to being blackmailed after publishing a negative review on Ferber Painting; she claimed that an article written about her would be deleted if she deleted her negative review. Similar articles have also been published.
