= Holy Name of Jesus Cathedral, Fianarantsoa =

Catholic cathedral in Madagascar

Coordinates: 21.4584°S 47.0762°E

Holy Name of Jesus Cathedral
- Cathédrale du Saint-Nom de Jésus
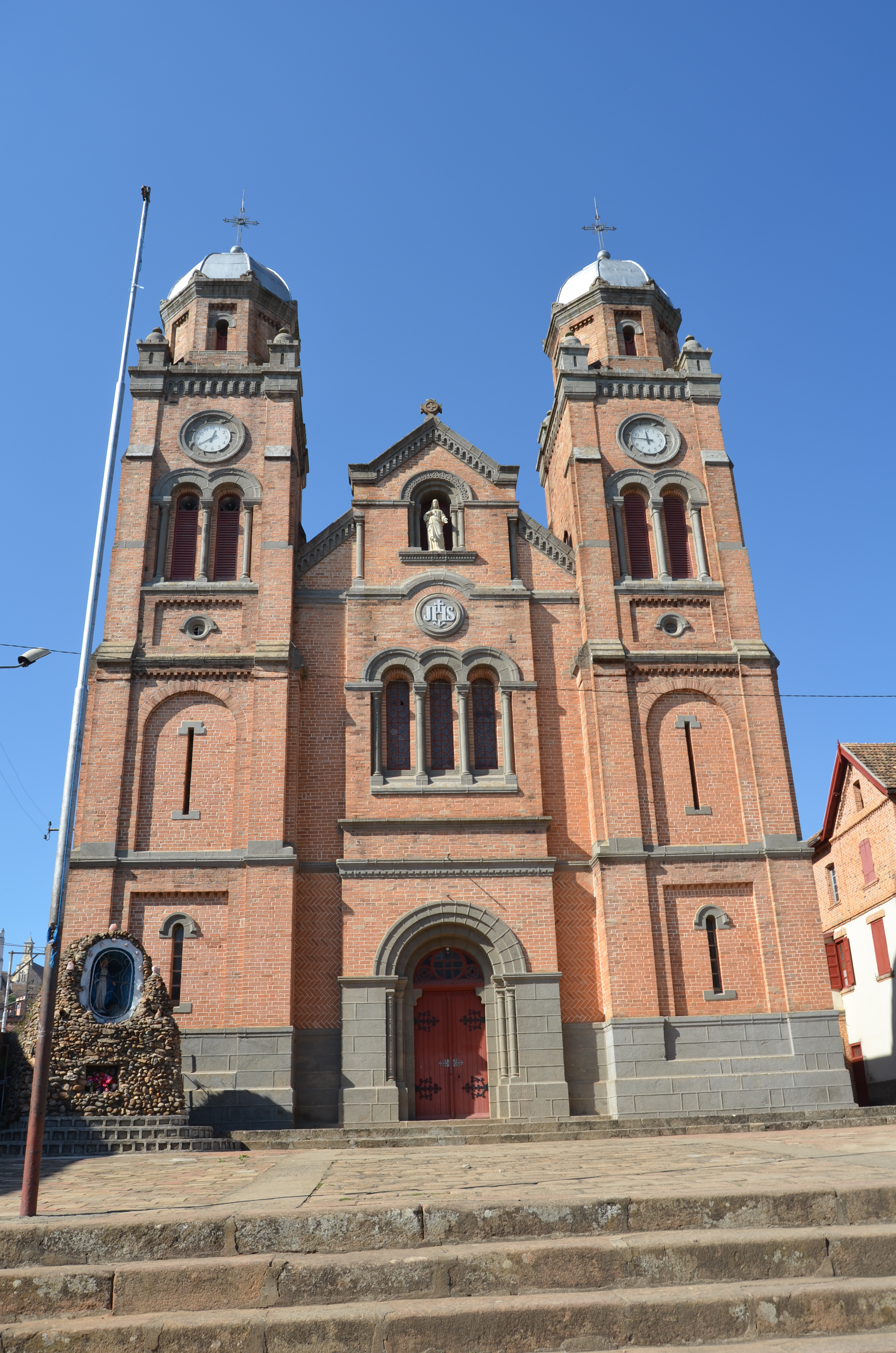
- Holy Name of Jesus Cathedral
- Location: Fianarantsoa
- Country: Madagascar
- Denomination: Roman Catholic Church

History
- Founded: 1871
- Dedicated: 1890

The Holy Name of Jesus Cathedral (French: Cathédrale du Saint-Nom de Jésus Malagasy: Katedraly ny Anarana Masin'i Jesoa) is a religious building that serves as a cathedral of the Catholic Church and is located in the town of Fianarantsoa, in the highlands of African island country of Madagascar. It is located specifically in the Rue du Rova (Rova Street), in the old town, and is the seat of the Archdiocese of Fianarantsoa (Latin: Archidioecesis Fianarantsoaensis).

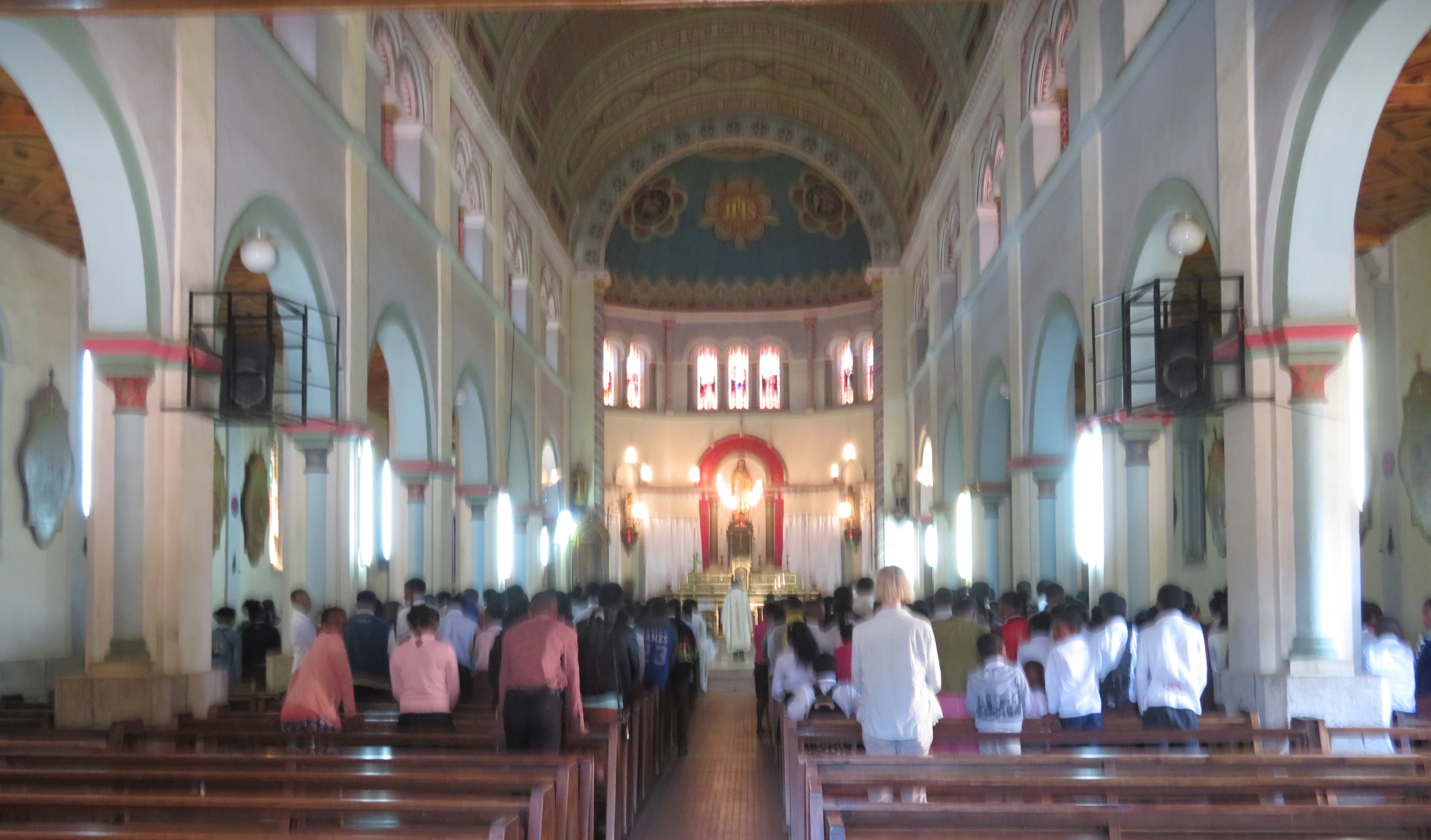
The interior of the cathedral

== See also ==
- Catholic Church in Madagascar
