= Louis Cambrézy =

French journalist and newspaper publisher

- Born: Louis Léon Cambrézy; 28 August 1874; Cayeux-sur-Mer, France
- Died: Fianarantsoa, French Madagascar
- Known for: L'Écho du Sud
- Awards: Chevalier of the Legion of Honour; Chevalier of the Star of Anjouan; Colonial Medal
- Military career
- Allegiance: French Third Republic
- Branch: Troupes coloniales
- Unit: 13th Colonial Infantry Regiment
- Conflicts: Second Madagascar expedition

Signature
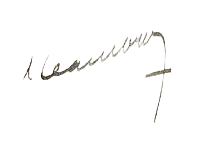

Louis Cambrézy (born 28 August 1874) was a French businessman and settler known for his newspaper L'Écho du Sud.

== Biography ==
Louis Léon Cambrézy was born in Cayeux-sur-Mer, in the Somme, northern France on 28 August 1874. After his military service in 1894, he was assigned to the 13th Colonial Infantry Regiment and took part in the Second Madagascar expedition from 1895 to 1897.

Subsequently, he settled permanently in the Colony of Madagascar. He successively became a commercial agent, merchant, mining operator and public works engineer.

In 1929, Cambrézy founded the newspaper L'Écho du Sud in Fianarantsoa, printed for the first time on 13 April 1929. This weekly newspaper took over from La Voix du Sud, another Fianarantsoa newspaper founded by Jules Thibier and which disappeared on last year.

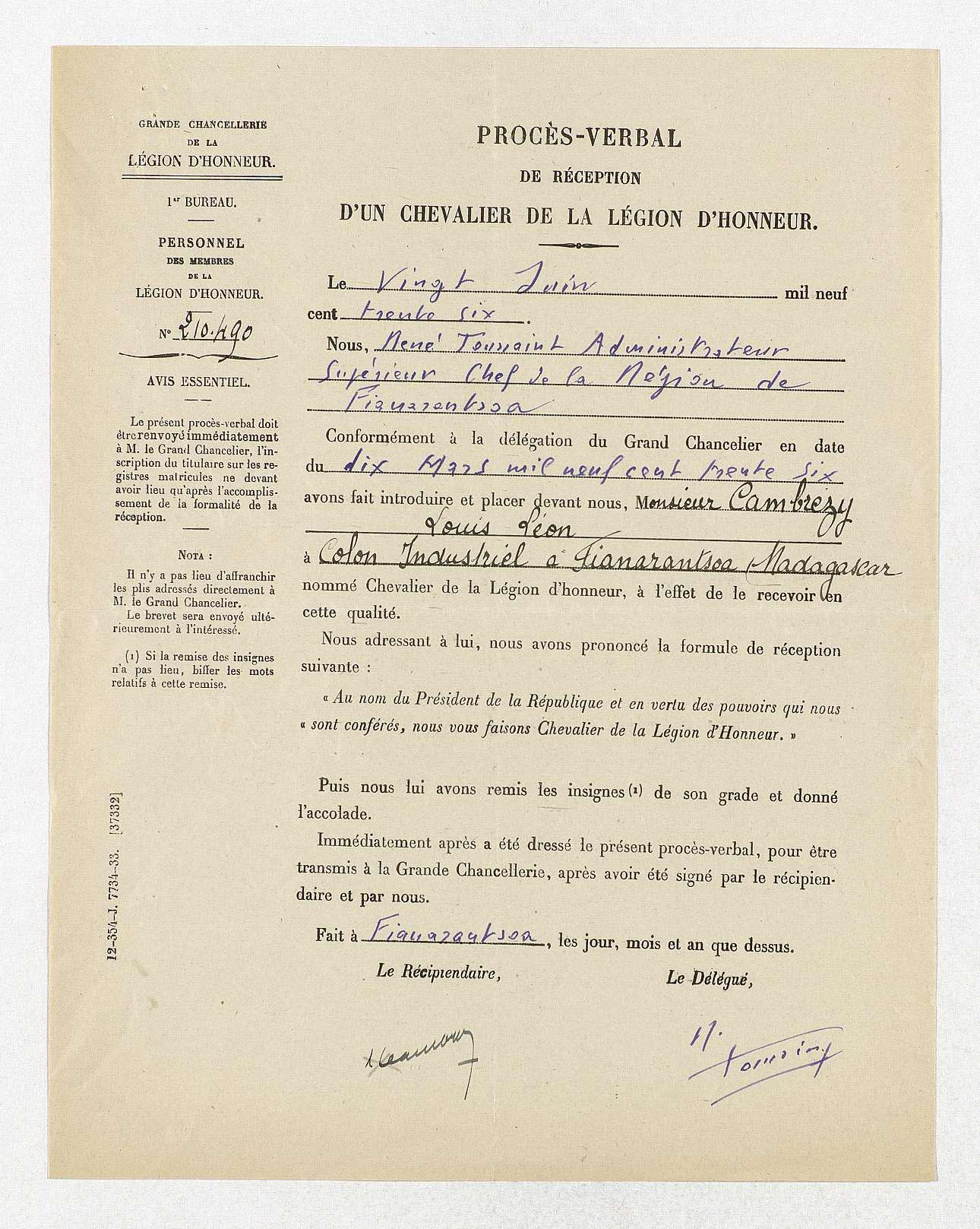
Minutes of the reception of Louis Cambrézy as Chevalier of the Legion of Honour

In 1936, he was awarded the Legion of Honour by Louis Rollin, Minister of the Colonies.

During the Second World War, he was stigmatized by the Vichy Regime because he was a Freemason.

== Personal life ==
He married for the first time on 16 March 1898 in Boulogne-sur-Mer with Octavie Joséphine Capron, then a second time on 23 March 1935 in Fianarantsoa with Renée Lucie Lebourdais.

== Honours and awards ==
- Chevalier of the Legion of Honour: 20 June 1936
- Chevalier of the Star of Anjouan
- Colonial Medal
