= Fianarantsoa Airport =

Airport in Madagascar

- IATA: WFI; ICAO: FMSF

Summary
- Airport type: Public/Military
- Operator: ADEMA (Aéroports de Madagascar)
- Serves: Fianarantsoa
- Location: Haute Matsiatra, Madagascar
- Elevation AMSL: 3,658 ft / 1,115 m
- Coordinates: 21°26′29″S 47°06′42″E

Map
- Location within Madagascar

Runways
Direction	Length		Surface
Direction	ft	m	Surface
08/26	4,101	1,250	Asphalt
- DAFIF

Fianarantsoa Airport (IATA: WFI, ICAO: FMSF) is an airport in Fianarantsoa, Madagascar.
