= Borač, Czech Republic =

Borač
- Municipality
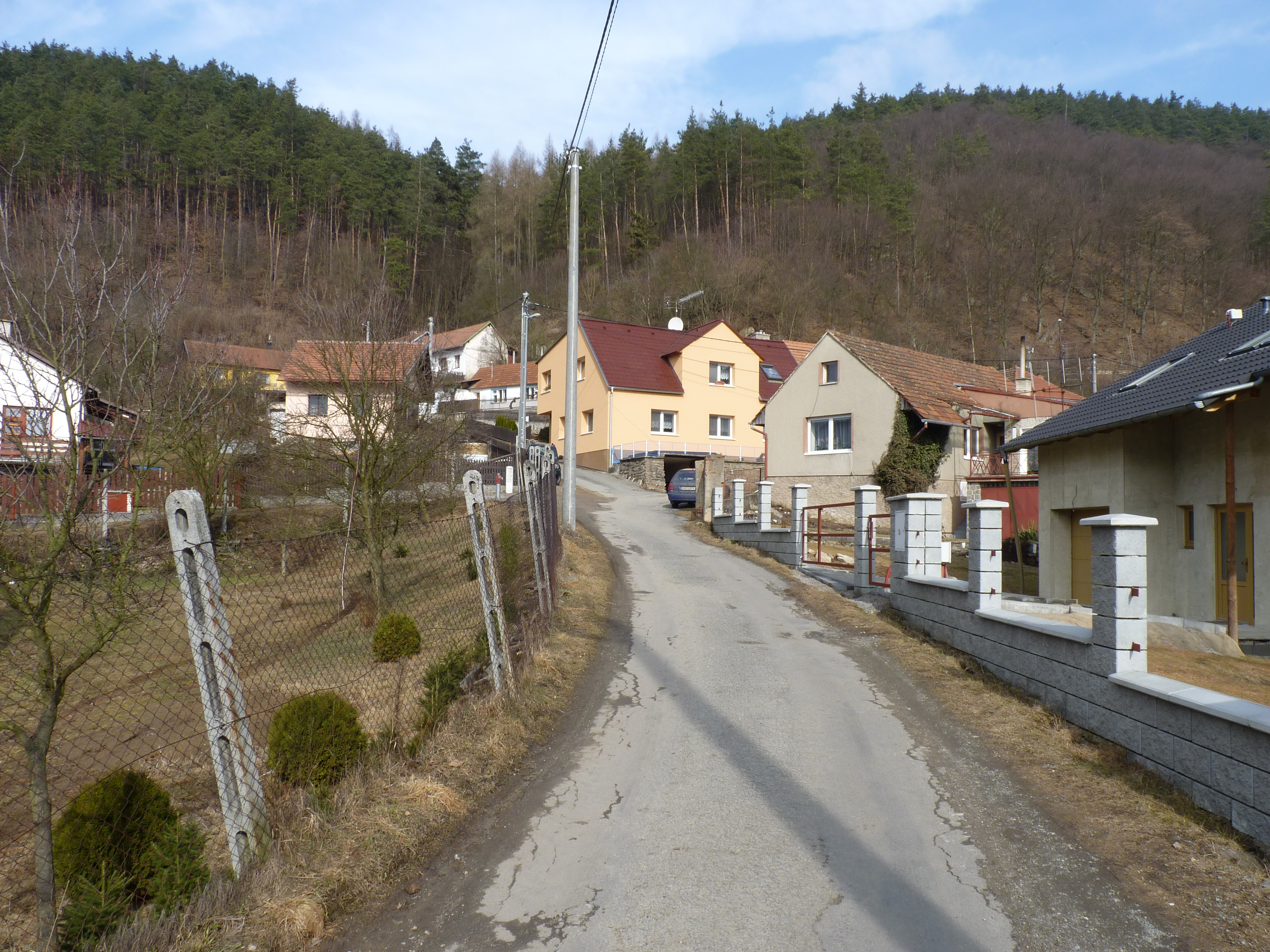
- Western part of Borač

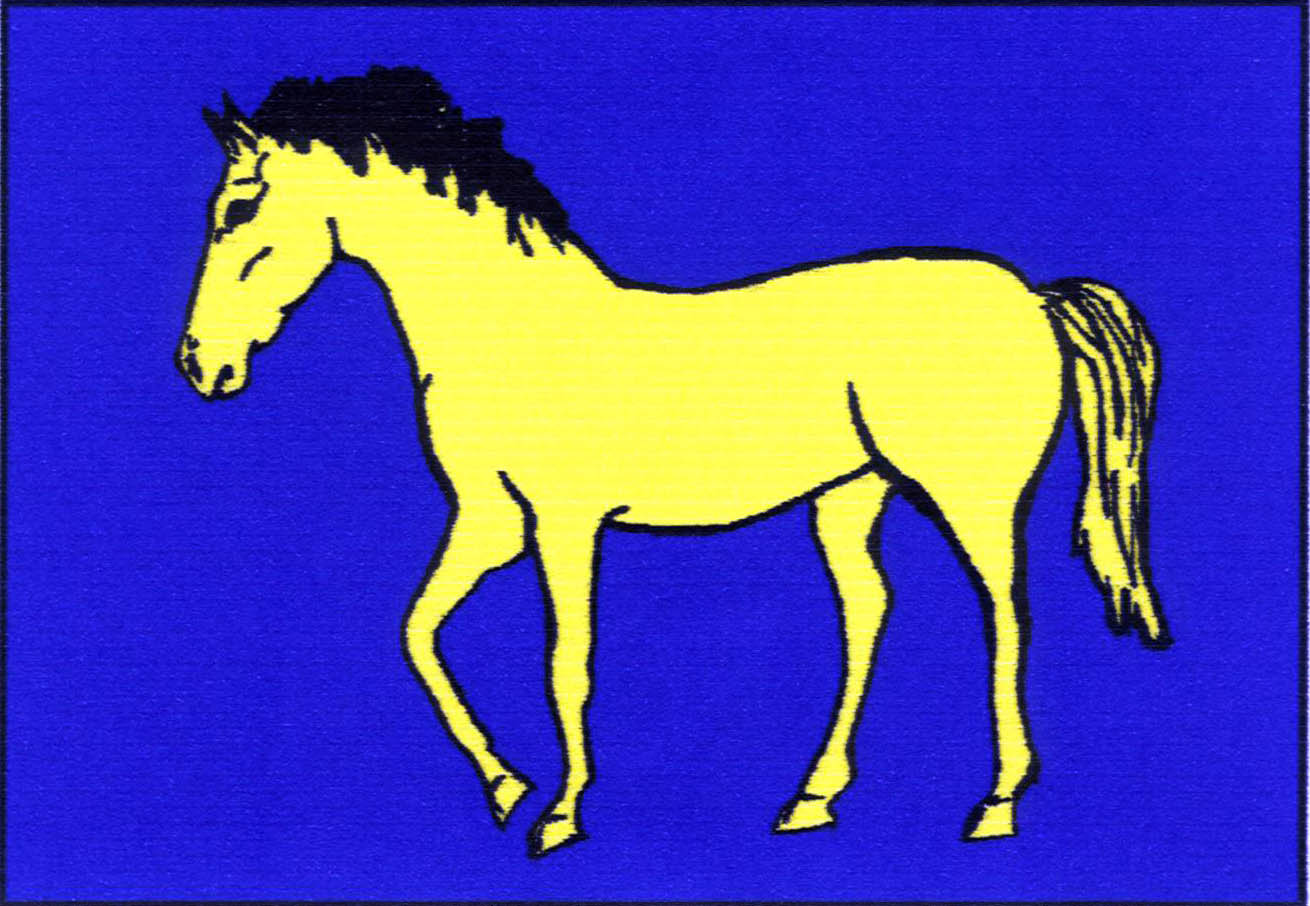
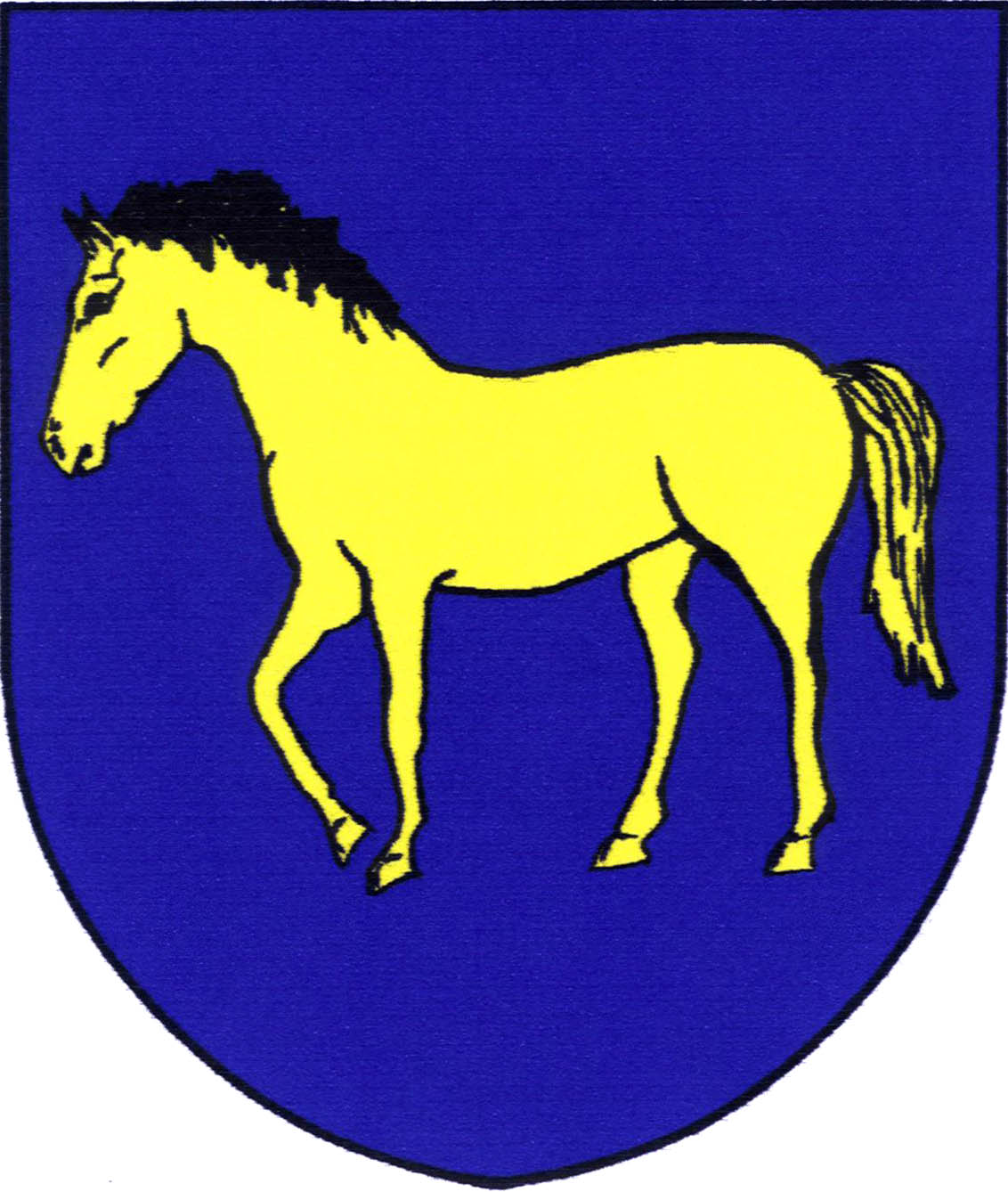
- Flag Coat of arms

- Location in the Czech Republic
- Coordinates: 49°24′3″N 16°21′40″E
- Country: Czech Republic
- Region: South Moravian
- District: Brno-Country
- First mentioned: 1368

Area
  - Total: 5.91 km^{2} (2.28 sq mi)
- Elevation: 279 m (915 ft)

Population (2026-01-01)
  - Total: 346
  - Density: 58.5/km^{2} (152/sq mi)
- Time zone: UTC+1 (CET)
  - Summer (DST): UTC+2 (CEST)
- Postal code: 592 61
- Website: www.borac.cz

Borač is a municipality and village in Brno-Country District in the South Moravian Region of the Czech Republic. It has about 300 inhabitants.

== Administrative division ==
Borač consists of two municipal parts (in brackets population according to the 2021 census):

- Borač (278)
- Podolí (87)

== Demographics ==
Historical population
Year	Pop.	±%
1869	436	—
1880	469	+7.6%
1890	436	−7.0%
1900	405	−7.1%
1910	383	−5.4%
1921	394	+2.9%
1930	418	+6.1%
1950	427	+2.2%
1961	508	+19.0%
1970	404	−20.5%
1980	348	−13.9%
1991	317	−8.9%
2001	300	−5.4%
2011	342	+14.0%
2021	365	+6.7%
Source: Censuses
