= Fianarantsoa =

Place in Haute Matsiatra, Madagascar

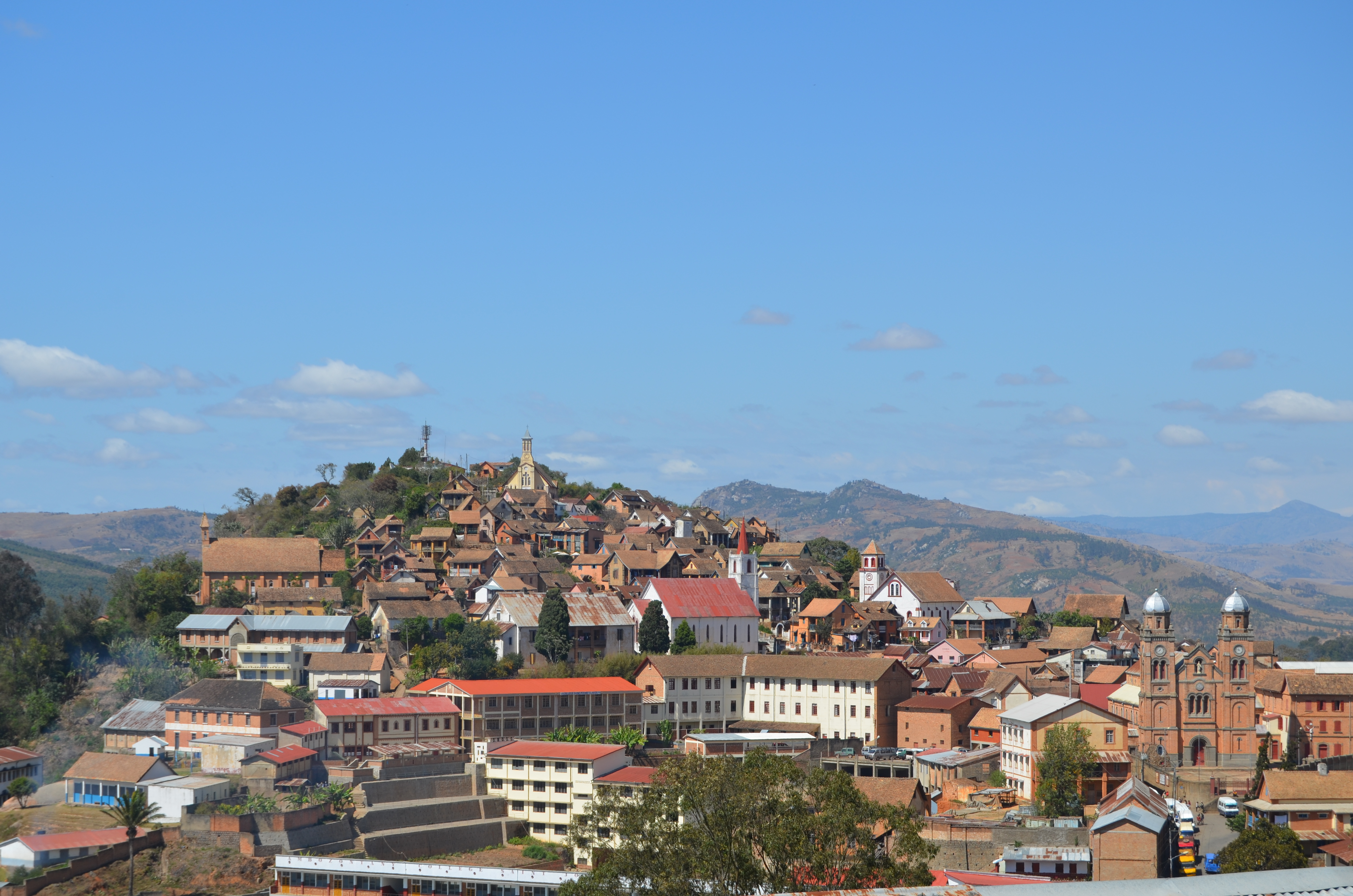
- Upper town Fianarantsoa

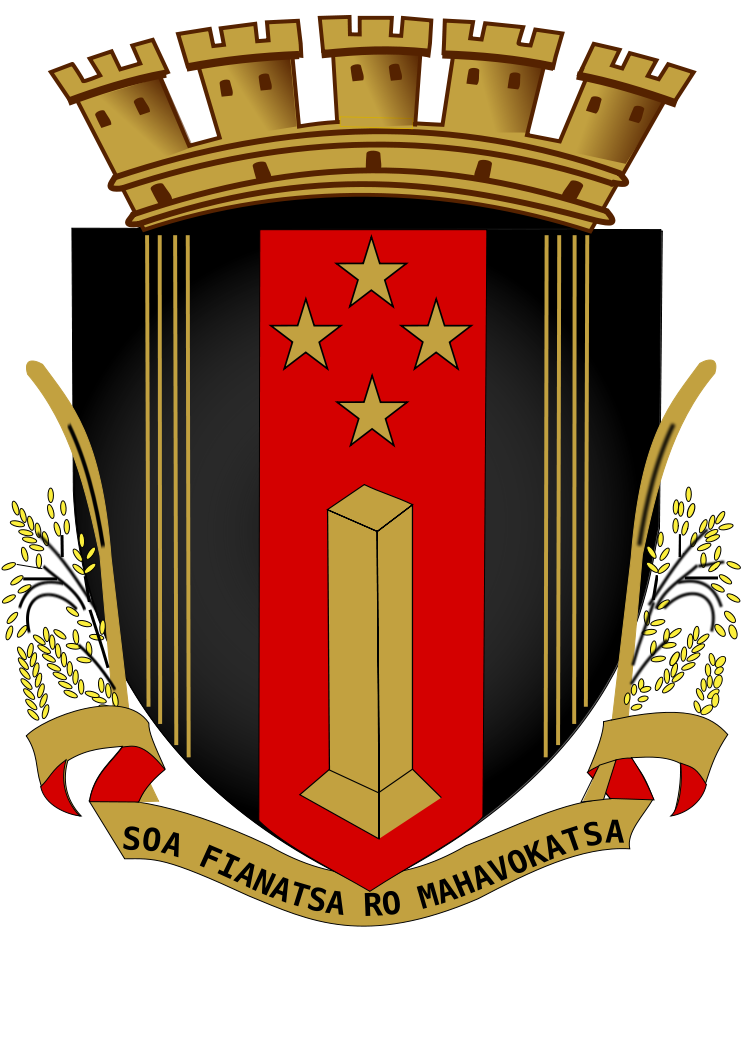
- Coat of arms

- Location of Fianarantsoa in Madagascar
- Coordinates: 21°27′13″S 047°05′09″E
- Country: Madagascar
- Province: Fianarantsoa
- Region: Haute Matsiatra
- District: Fianarantsoa
- Founded: 1830

Government
  - Mayor: Dr. RATSIMBAZAFY Sahondramalala Esther

Area
  - Total: 86.05 km^{2} (33.22 sq mi)
- Elevation: 1,200 m (3,900 ft)

Population (2018)
  - Total: 191,776
  - Density: 2,229/km^{2} (5,772/sq mi)
- Time zone: East Africa Time (GMT+3)
- Postal code: 301
- Climate: Cwb
- Website: http://fianara.cufianarantsoa.mg/

Fianarantsoa is a city (commune urbaine) in south central Madagascar, and is the capital of Haute Matsiatra Region.

== History ==
It was built in the early 19th century by the Merina as the administrative capital for the newly conquered Betsileo kingdoms.

Fianarantsoa means "Good education" in Malagasy. It is a cultural and intellectual center for the whole island. It is home to some of the oldest Protestant and Lutheran cathedrals on the island, the oldest theological seminary (also Lutheran), as well as the Roman Catholic Archdiocese of Fianarantsoa (seated in the Cathedral of the Holy Name of Jesus). The city of "good education" also boasts a university named after it and built in 1972. Fianarantsoa is considered to be the capital of wine in Madagascar, because of the presence of many wine industries in the city.

== Geography ==
It is at an average altitude of 1,200 metres (3,900 ft), and has a population of 191,766.

The town is linked to the rest of the country by the National road 7, one of the main highways in Madagascar. The distance is 411 km to the capital Antananarivo, 192 km to Ihosy, 518 km to Tulear.

Ranomafana National Park is a nature park popular among tourists that lies 65 km to the northeast of Fianarantsoa. Another hot spot of tourism is the Isandra geological formations, roughly 30 km Northwest of Fianarantsoa. It can be accessed by the unpaved National road 42 from Fianarantsoa.

== Rivers ==
Two rivers cross this town: the Mandranofotsy in the West, and the Tsiandanitra in the East. Both are affluents of the Matsiatra river.

== Transport ==
The city is at the endpoint of the Fianarantsoa-Côte Est Railway to Manakara. There is also an airport. The city lies on the Route Nationale 7, which goes from the capital in Antananarivo to the coastal city of Toliara. Also the unpaved National road 42 takes its origins in Fianarantsoa.

== Education ==
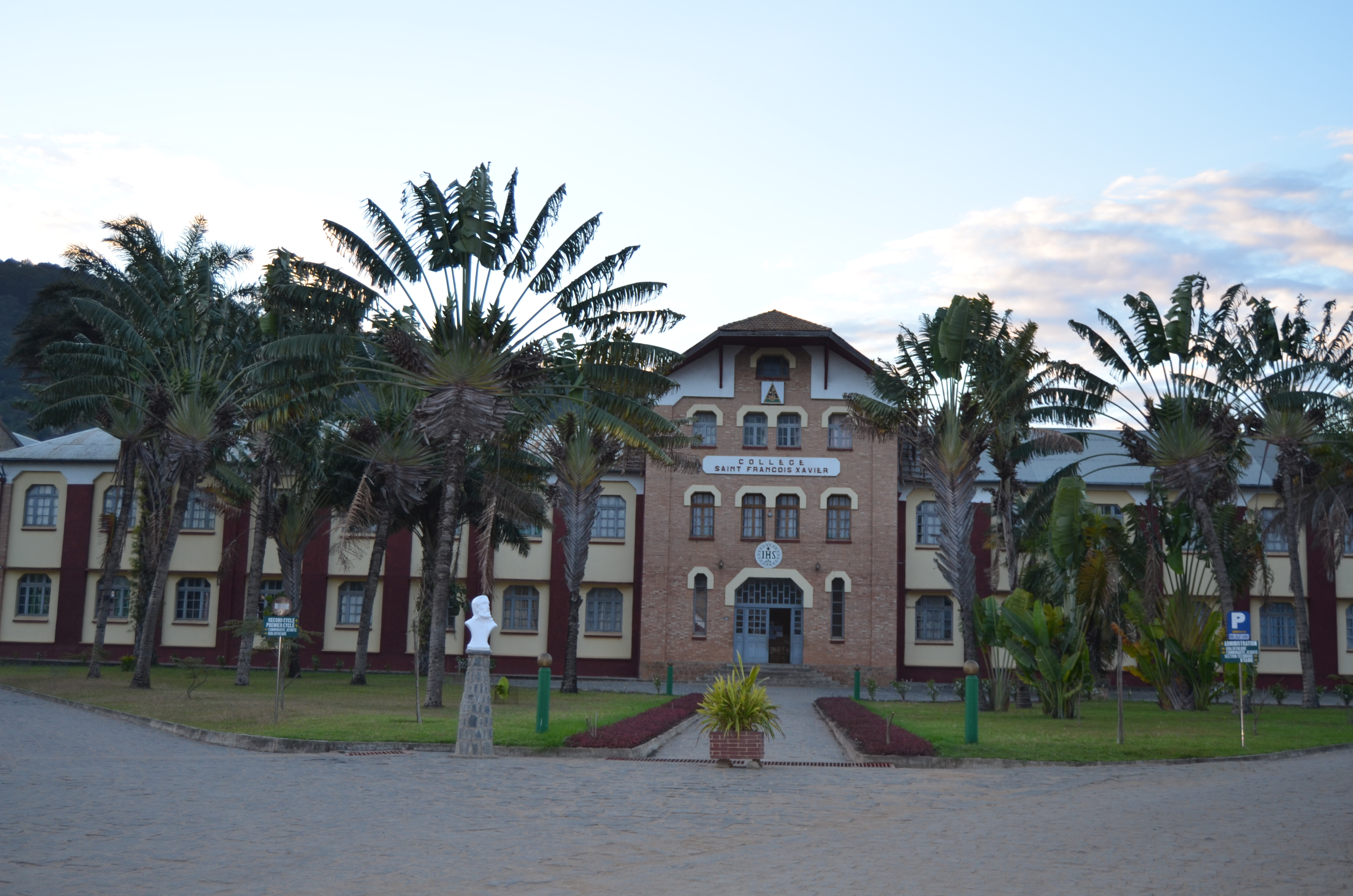
Collège Saint François Xavier Fianarantsoa

- Université de Fianarantsoa
- Faculté de médecine de Fianarantsoa

French international schools:

- Collège français René-Cassin

== Sights ==
In the Upper Town (Haute Ville), Fianarantsoa's historical centre, where many brick houses were renovated in the original style, various churches on Rue du Rova street are worth a visit. The oldest church in Fianarantsoa is Eglise Antranobiriky dating from 1859. Fahazavana Church was built at the end of the 19th century in a neoromanesque style. Fiangonana Trinité Masombahoaka is a Protestant neogothic church dating from 1885. The largest church, the cathedral Cathédrale du Saint-Nom-de-Jésus de Fianarantsoa, was built from 1871 to 1890.

The train station in the busy district Lower Town (Basse Ville) was inaugurated in 1935. In front of the train station, in the middle of Place de la gare square, a memorial dedicated to the victims of the Malagasy Uprising of 1947 was erected.

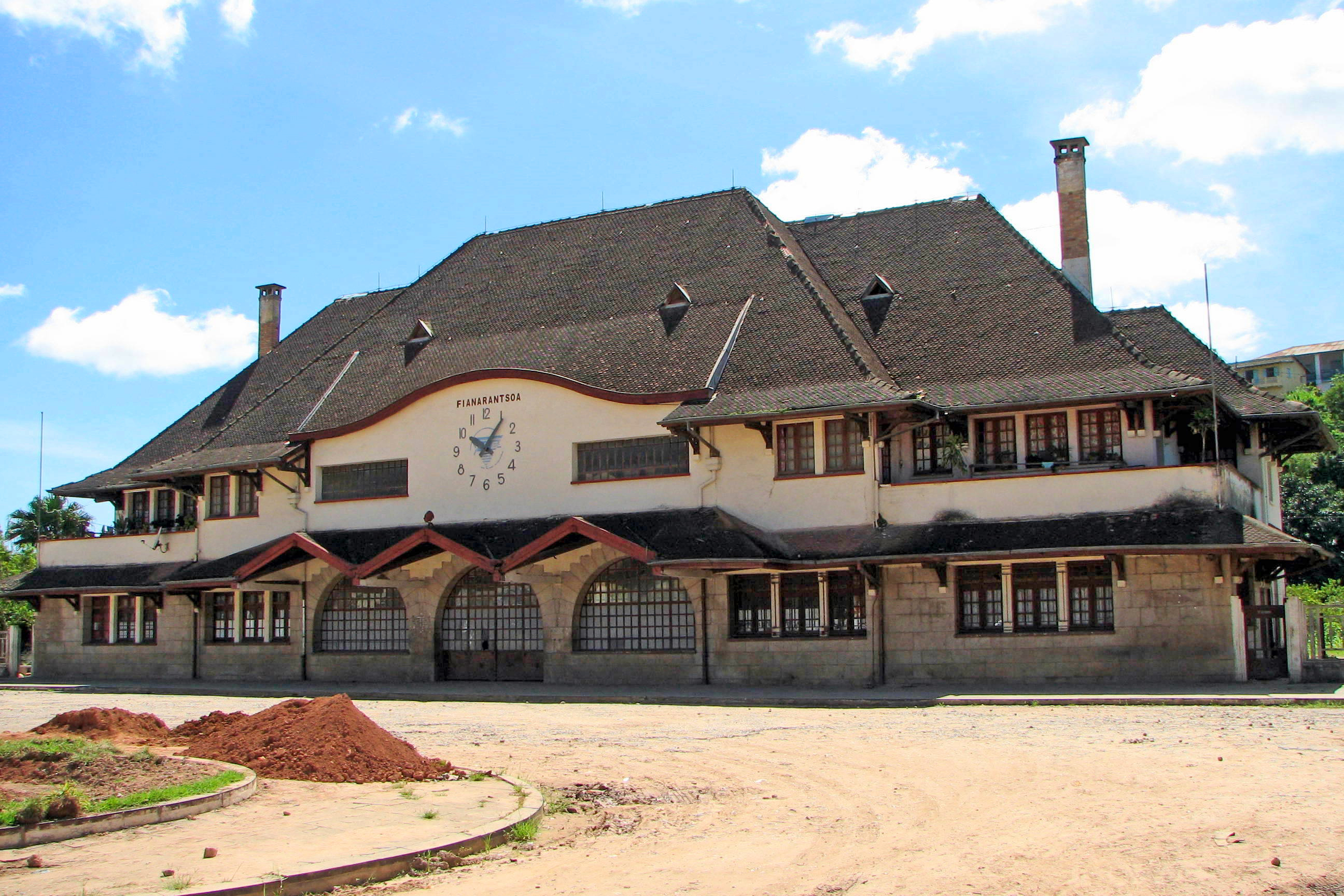
Train station

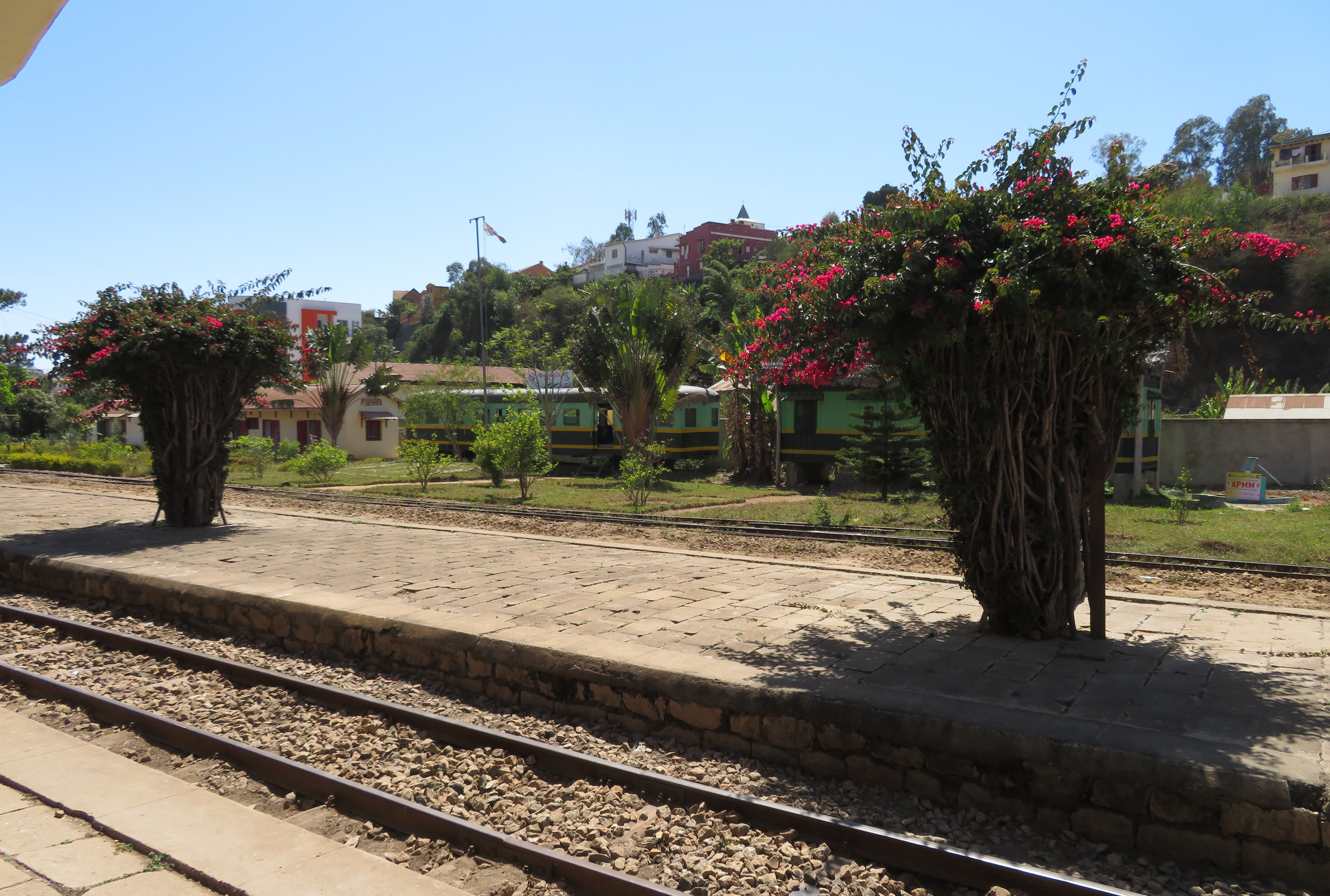
Train station

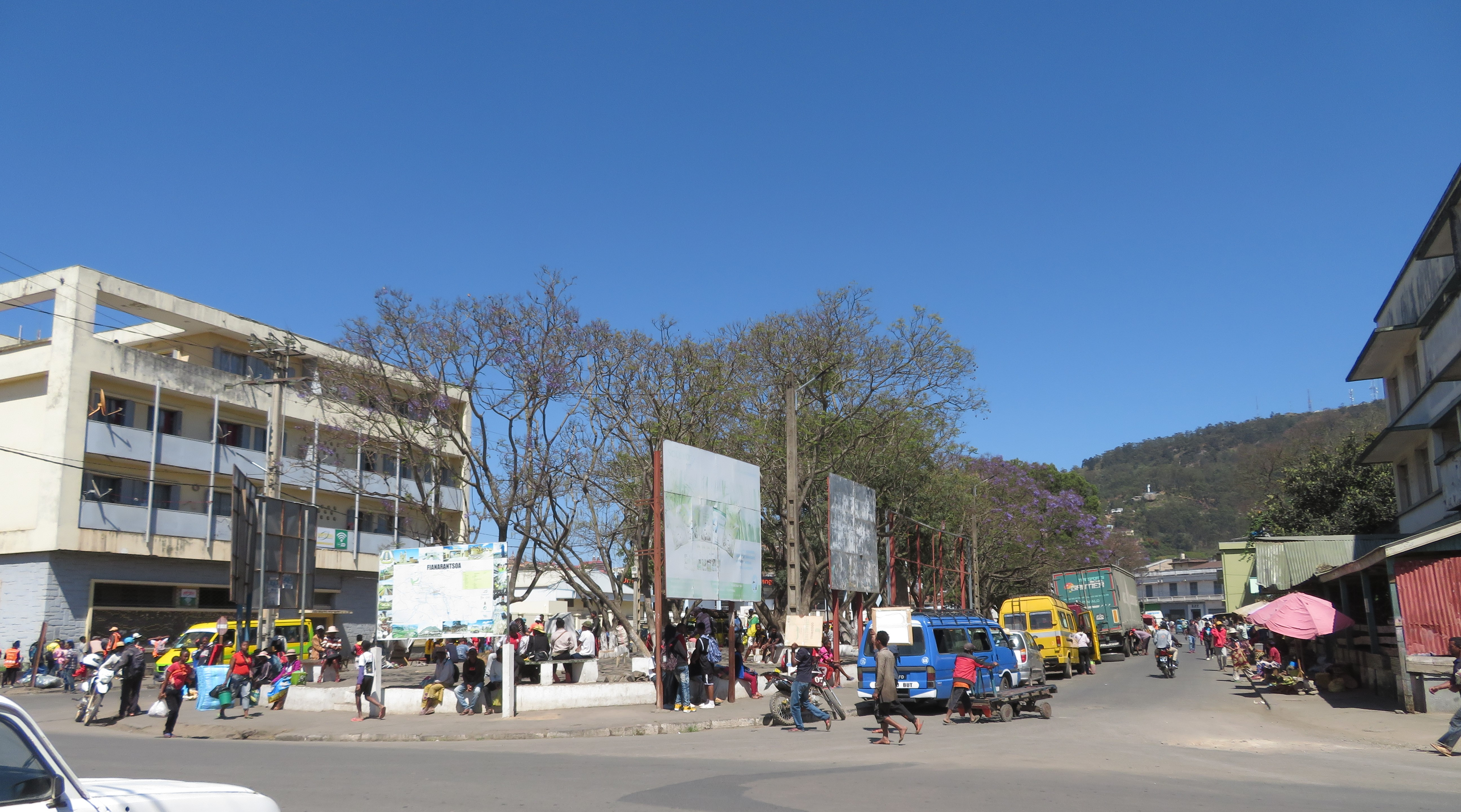
Place de la Gare

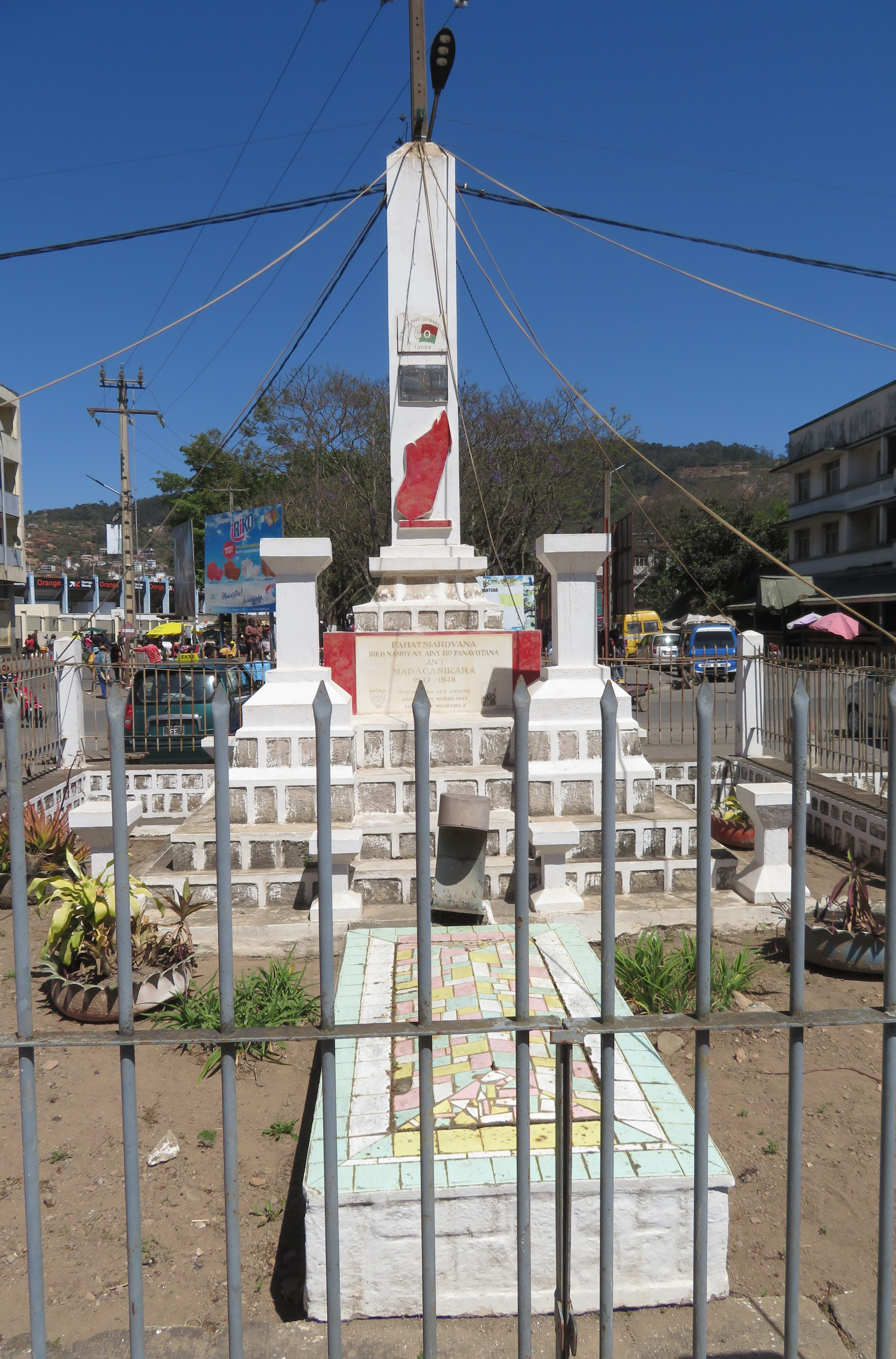
Monument

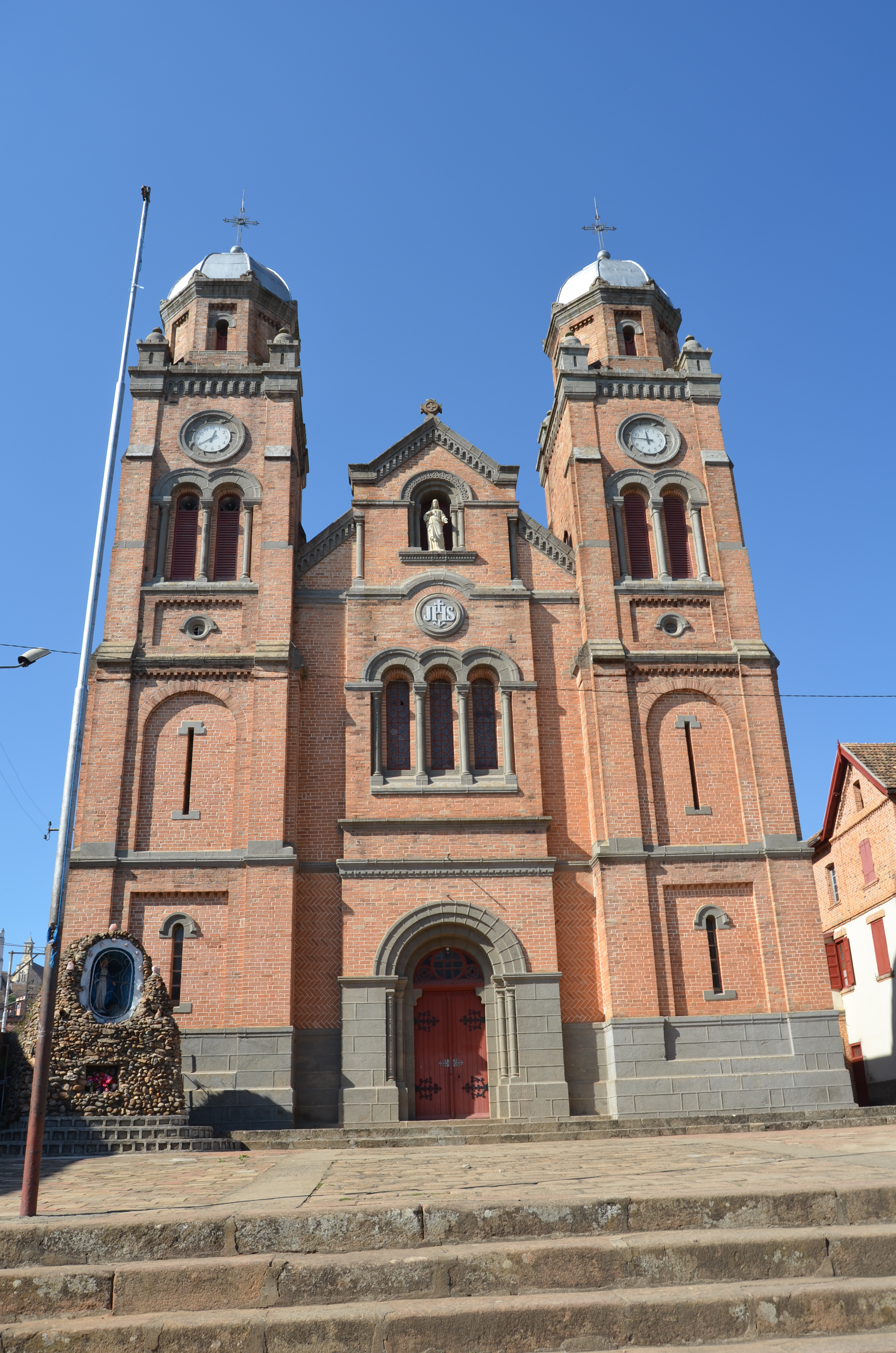
Cathedral

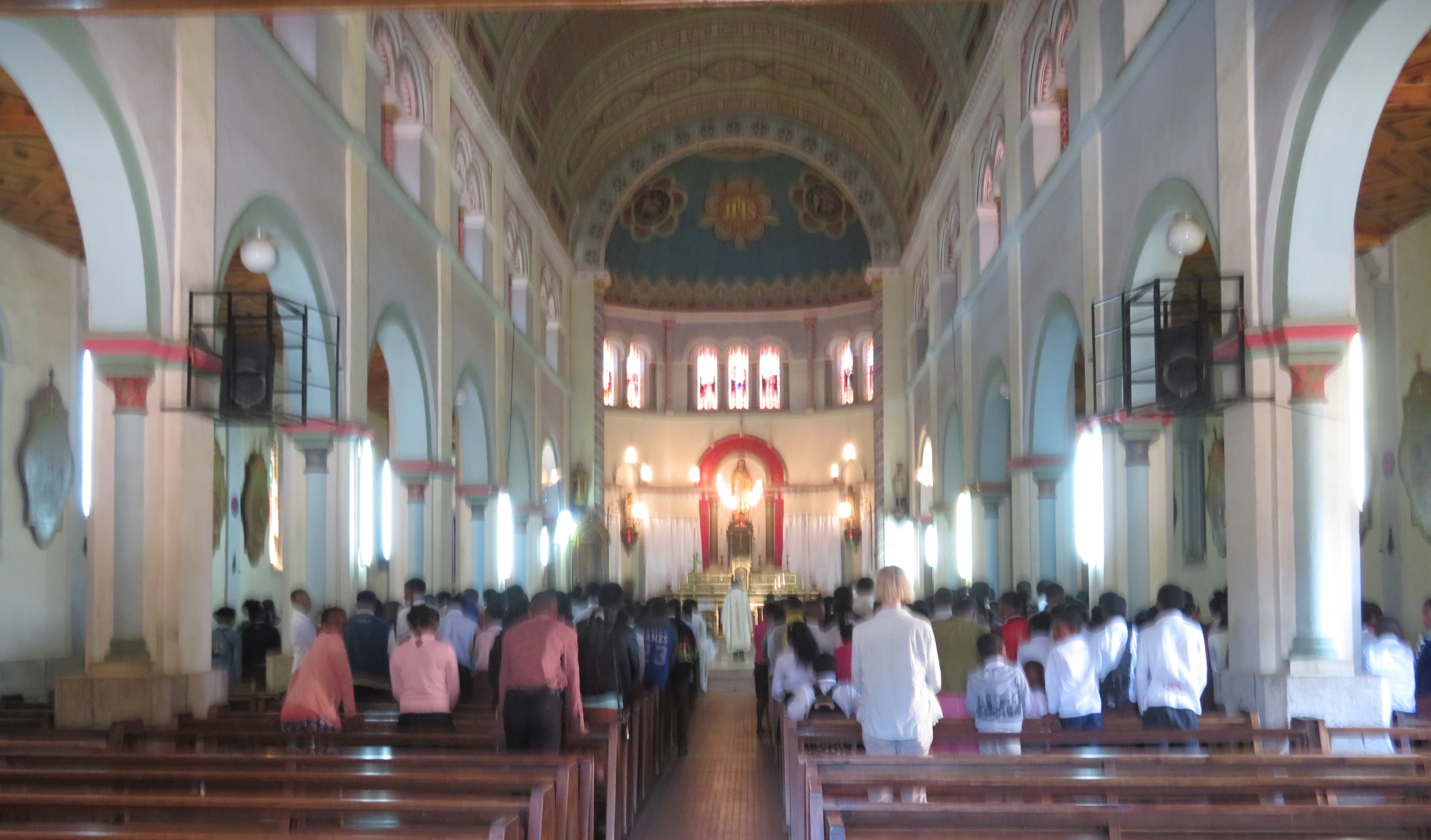
Cathedral

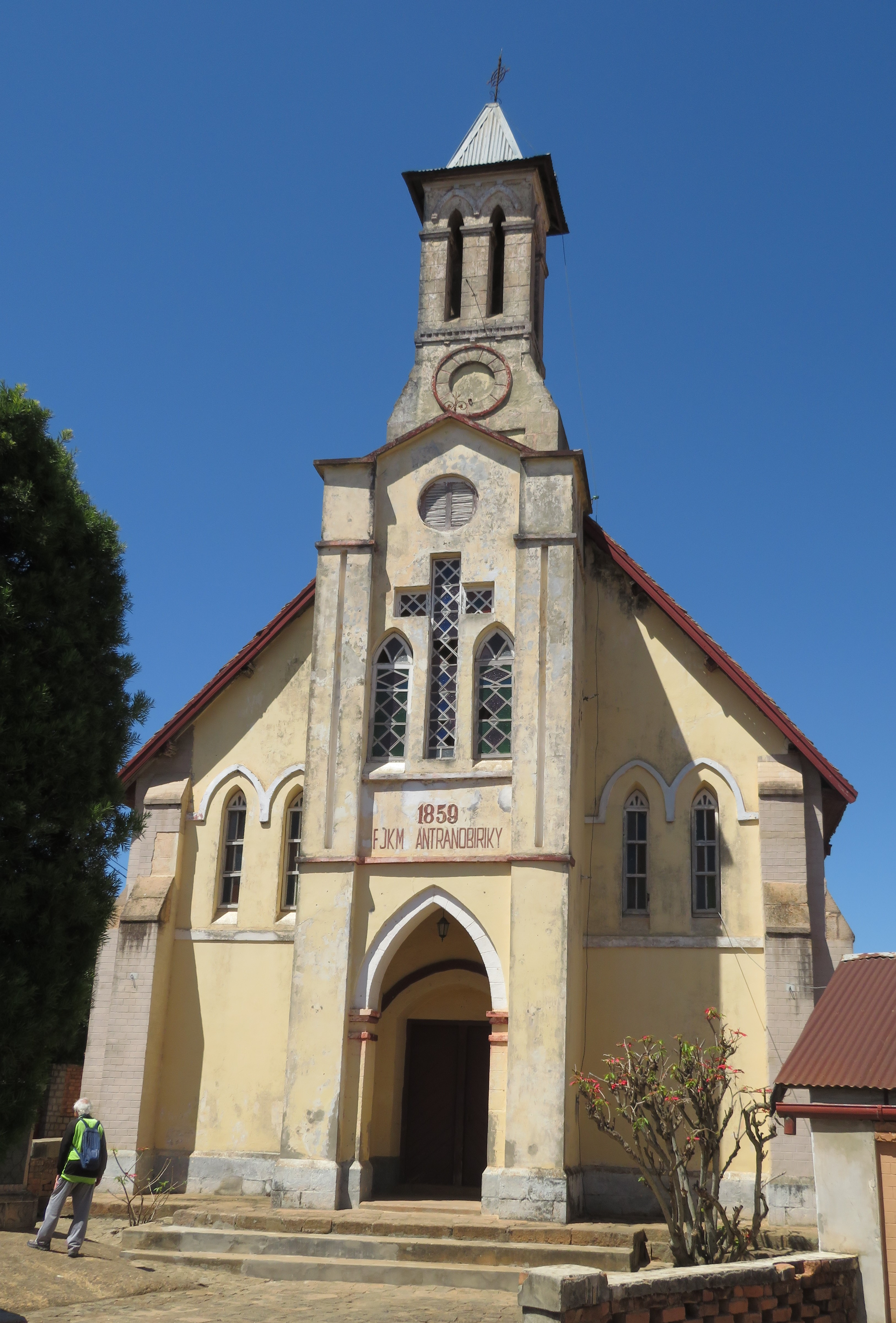
Eglise Antranobiriky (1859)

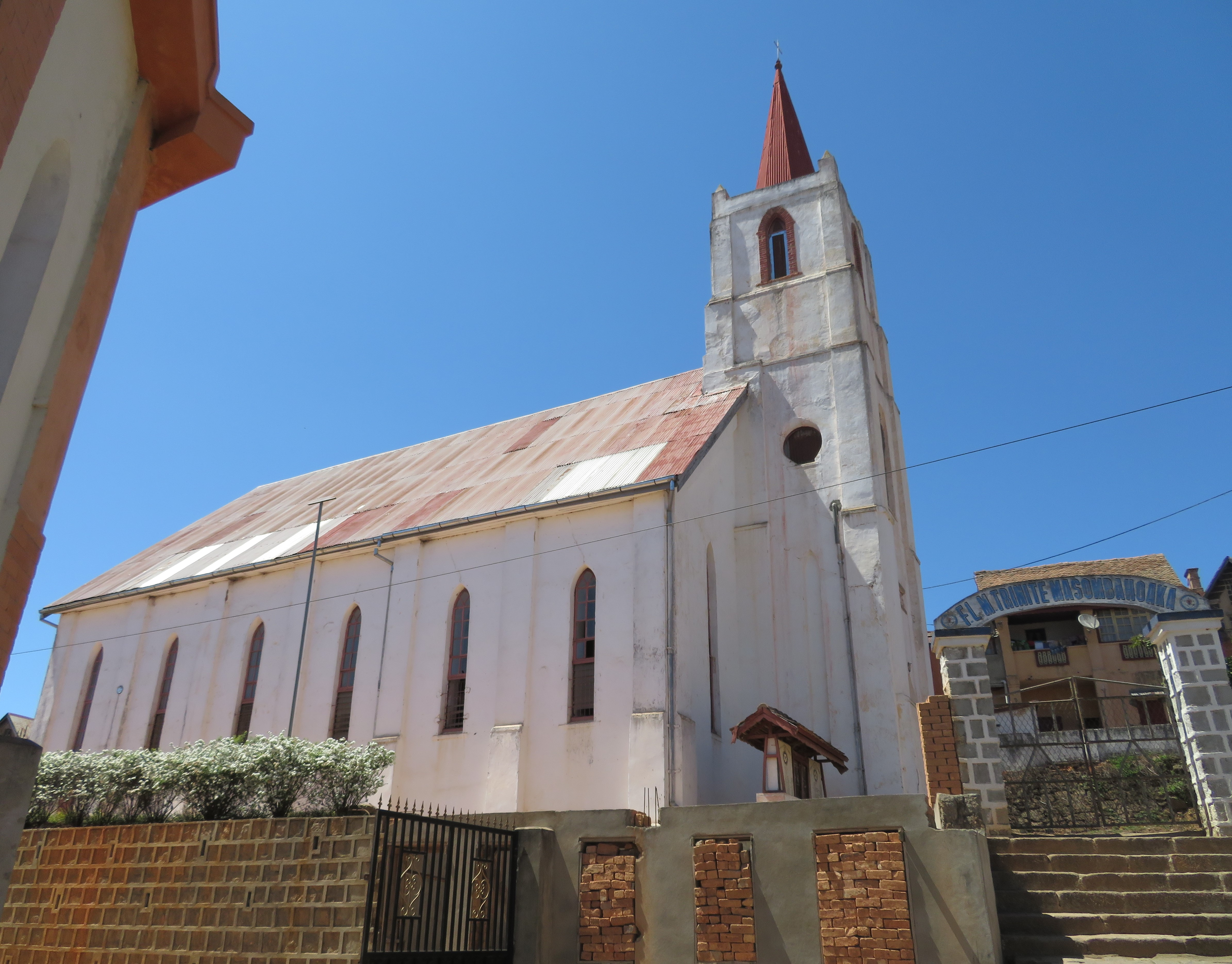
Eglise Trinité Mahasombahoaka (1885)

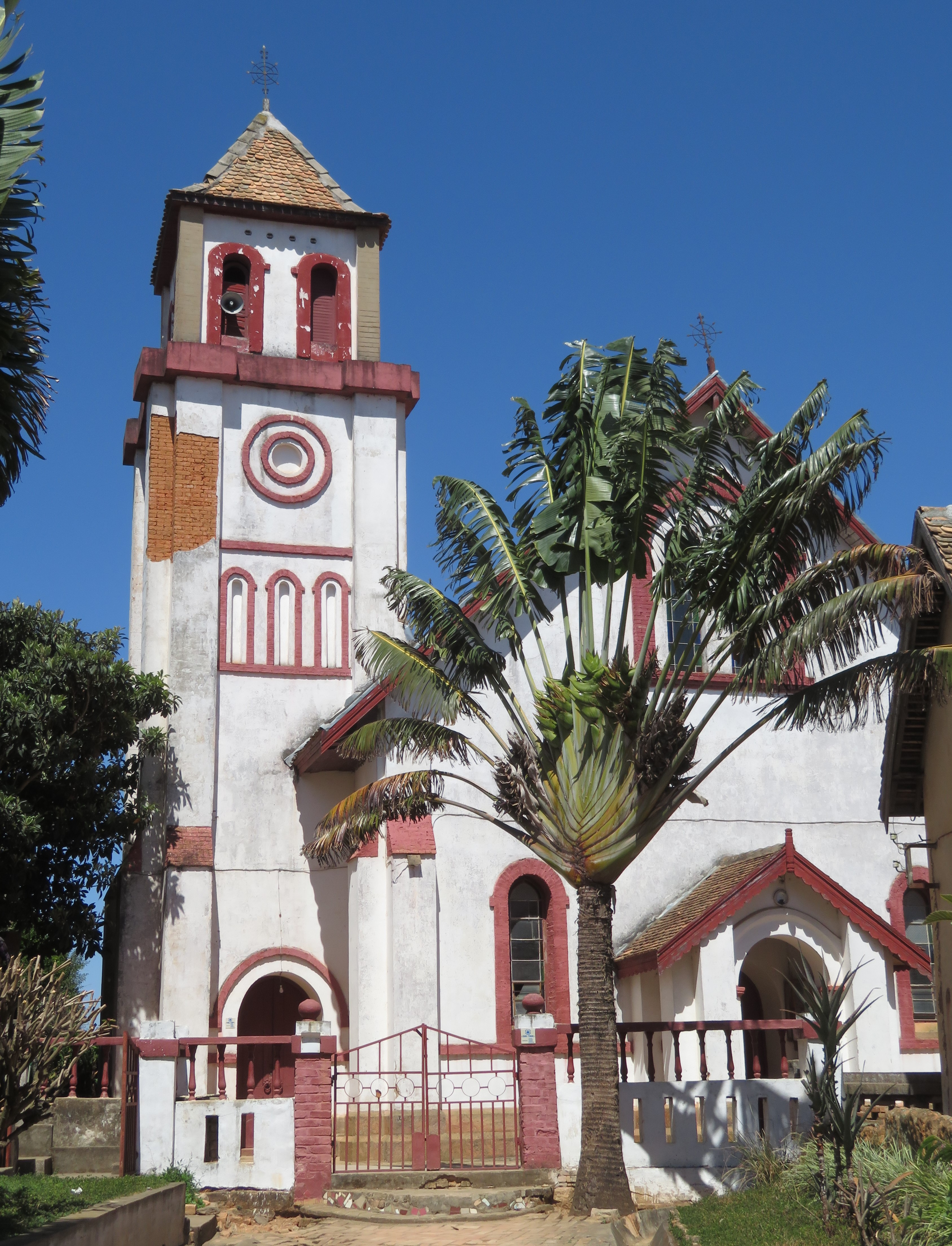
Eglise Fahazavana

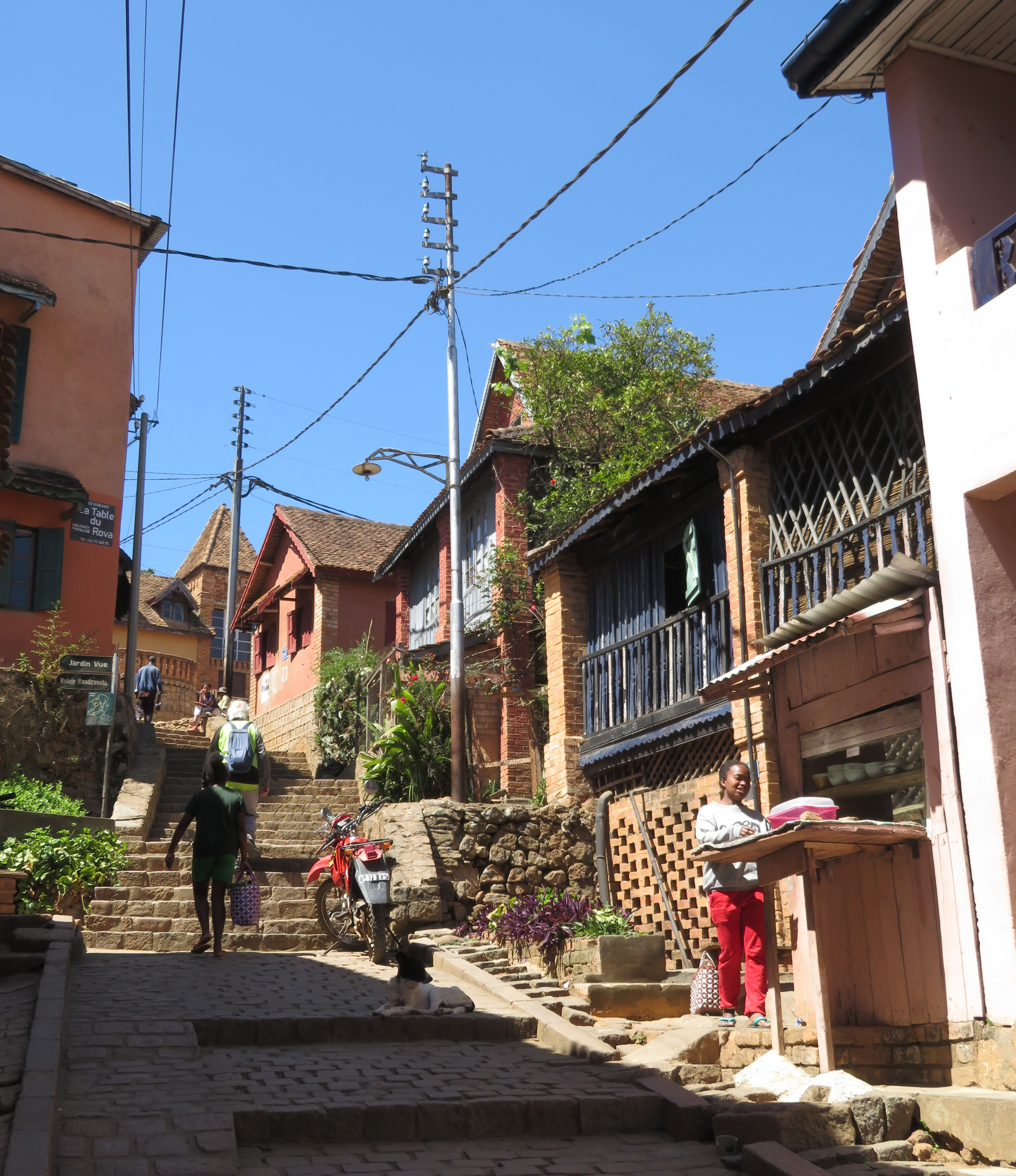
Rue du Rova

== Sports ==
- Football: the ASF Fianarantsoa and Zanak'Ala FC are the local football teams.

== Personalities ==
- Odon Razanakolona (born 1946), archbishop
- Pety Rakotoniaina (born 1962), politician
- Louis Cambrézy (1874), founder of the newspaper L'Écho du Sud based in Fianarantsoa.

== Climate ==
Köppen-Geiger climate classification system classifies its climate as humid subtropical (Cwa).

Climate data for Fianarantsoa (1991–2020)
Month	Jan	Feb	Mar	Apr	May	Jun	Jul	Aug	Sep	Oct	Nov	Dec	Year
Record high °C (°F)	33.4 (92.1)	32.0 (89.6)	31.9 (89.4)	32.2 (90.0)	29.9 (85.8)	27.3 (81.1)	28.5 (83.3)	33.0 (91.4)	32.5 (90.5)	35.2 (95.4)	34.8 (94.6)	34.0 (93.2)	35.2 (95.4)
Mean daily maximum °C (°F)	26.8 (80.2)	26.5 (79.7)	26.4 (79.5)	25.4 (77.7)	23.5 (74.3)	21.2 (70.2)	20.3 (68.5)	21.9 (71.4)	24.1 (75.4)	26.2 (79.2)	27.6 (81.7)	27.7 (81.9)	24.8 (76.6)
Daily mean °C (°F)	22.5 (72.5)	22.3 (72.1)	22.0 (71.6)	20.7 (69.3)	18.7 (65.7)	16.4 (61.5)	15.5 (59.9)	16.4 (61.5)	18.1 (64.6)	20.4 (68.7)	22.0 (71.6)	22.7 (72.9)	19.8 (67.7)
Mean daily minimum °C (°F)	18.1 (64.6)	18.0 (64.4)	17.5 (63.5)	16.0 (60.8)	13.9 (57.0)	11.6 (52.9)	10.7 (51.3)	11.0 (51.8)	12.1 (53.8)	14.6 (58.3)	16.3 (61.3)	17.6 (63.7)	14.8 (58.6)
Record low °C (°F)	12.2 (54.0)	12.8 (55.0)	11.8 (53.2)	9.4 (48.9)	5.6 (42.1)	2.0 (35.6)	2.9 (37.2)	4.1 (39.4)	5.0 (41.0)	7.0 (44.6)	10.0 (50.0)	11.5 (52.7)	2.0 (35.6)
Average precipitation mm (inches)	259.3 (10.21)	218.5 (8.60)	139.6 (5.50)	44.3 (1.74)	25.3 (1.00)	16.4 (0.65)	24.3 (0.96)	12.5 (0.49)	9.9 (0.39)	39.3 (1.55)	117.5 (4.63)	180.1 (7.09)	1,087 (42.81)
Average precipitation days (≥ 1.0 mm)	17.4	15.3	12.3	7.0	5.0	4.5	6.7	3.8	1.9	4.9	9.3	14.4	102.5
Average relative humidity (%)	83	84	86	84	83	84	85	82	78	77	79	83	82
Mean monthly sunshine hours	191.1	171.0	175.4	184.8	186.0	165.9	163.5	191.1	220.5	230.4	208.0	190.1	2,277.8
Source 1: NOAA (sun, 1961-1990)
Source 2: Deutscher Wetterdienst (humidity 1951–1967)

== See also ==
- List of cities in Madagascar
