= Laraki =

Moroccan sports car manufacturer

Laraki Automobiles
- Type: Private
- Industry: Automotive
- Founded: 1999; 27 years ago
- Founder: Abdeslam Laraki
- Headquarters: Casablanca, Morocco
- Area served: Worldwide
- Products: Fulgura; Borac; Epitome; Sahara

Laraki Automobiles is a Moroccan manufacturer of high-performance sports cars based in Casablanca, Morocco. The company was established in 1999 by Abdeslam Laraki, a Moroccan designer and entrepreneur with a background in yacht design and industrial engineering.

Laraki gained international attention with the unveiling of its first prototype, the Laraki Fulgura, at the 2002 Geneva Motor Show. This was followed by additional concept models, including the Laraki Borac and the Laraki Epitome. These vehicles are characterized by their bold styling, powerful engines, and limited production, placing them in the luxury and supercar segments.

As one of the few African companies focused on designing and producing supercars, Laraki Automobiles represents an effort within Morocco’s automotive industry.

== History ==
Laraki was established in 1999 by Abdesslam Laraki, a Moroccan designer and entrepreneur who first became wealthy by importing cars in Morocco beginning in 1973. His son and the current owner of the firm is Abdeslam Laraki, a Moroccan designer who started out creating luxurious yachts and created the eponym company Laraki. Then following the steps of his father, he studied automobile design in Switzerland and soon after launched his first model, the Laraki Fulgura, in 2002.

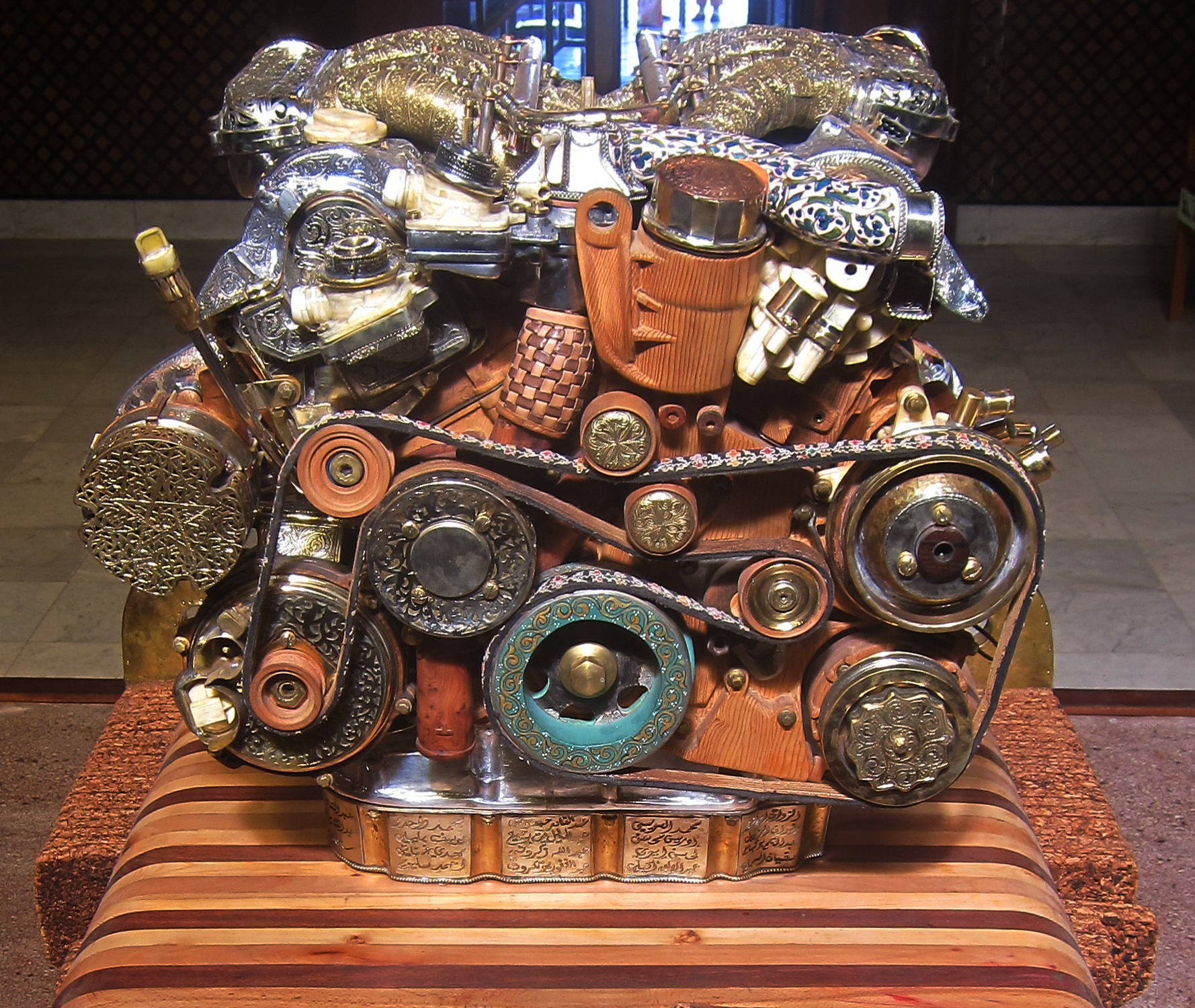
Eric Van Hove's V12 Laraki

In 2012, the conceptual artist Eric Van Hove arrived in Marrakesh to resume work on an ambitious sculptural endeavor he had prepared for years: V12 Laraki. In the space of nine months, he gathered around him 42 master craftsmen from the region and began rebuilding a Mercedes 6.2 L V12 engine using rural materials and centuries old craft techniques from the North African country. Conceptually, this sculpture is based on the story of the Laraki Fulgura, which was entirely manufactured in Morocco to the exception of its engine. The artist decided to try and reproduce that cutting-edge component locally using craft That sculpture was displayed at the 5th Marrakech Biennale and soon acquired by the Hood Museum of Art.

== Models ==
=== Fulgura ===
The Laraki Fulgura is the company's first attempt at a sports car. Originally unveiled as a concept at the 2002 Geneva Motor Show, a proposed production version debuted a year later at the same show. A slightly redesigned version of the bodywork was unveiled in 2005.

Based on the frame and mechanicals of a Lamborghini Diablo, the Fulgura is equipped with a quad-turbocharged Mercedes-Benz 6.0 L V12, initially proposed to produce 920 hp (686 kW), attached to a 6-speed manual transmission. A new aerodynamic carbon fibre body was also added. This brings the Fulgura to an estimated price of $555,750. Performance for the Fulgura is an estimated top speed of 398 km/h (247 mph) and acceleration of 0 – 100 km/h (62 mph) in 3.3 seconds. By 2006, these figures were amended and the 6.0 L V12 was proposed to produce 730 hp (544 kW), and was mated to a 7-speed gearbox, giving it a top speed of 350 km/h (217 mph) and 0–100 km/h (62 mph) acceleration in 3.4 seconds. The cheaper V8 version of the Fulgara has a 5.4 L supercharged M113 engine which produces 570 hp.

=== Borac ===
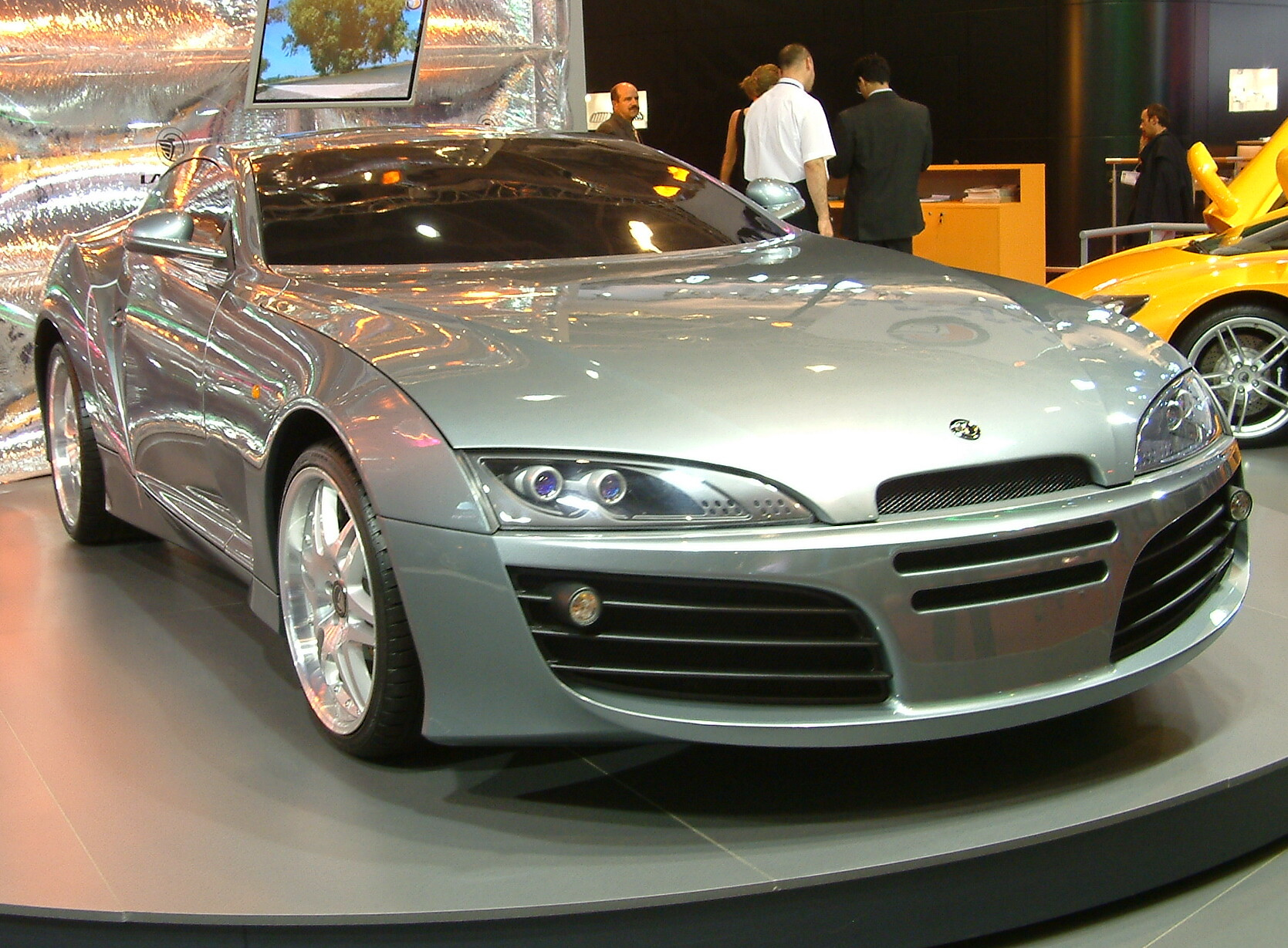
Laraki Borac

The Laraki Borac is the company's second model, and debuted as a concept at the 2005 Geneva Motor Show. The car was originally planned for production by 2011, but a final design was never unveiled.

The design of the Borac is that of a grand tourer, with a front engine layout and even the possibility of two small rear seats. The Borac is not based on an existing design, unlike the Fulgura. A Mercedes-Benz 6.0 L V12 powers the car, although it lacks the turbocharging of the Fulgura. This results in a proposed output of 540 hp (400 kW), giving it a top speed of 310 km/h (193 mph) and acceleration from 0 - 60 mph (97 km/h) in 4.5 seconds.

=== Epitome ===
The Laraki Epitome was unveiled at the Pebble Beach Concours d'Elegance in 2013. Nine cars of this model are planned to be built.

Fitted with the V8 engine of a Z06 Chevrolet Corvette, Laraki added twin turbochargers to the already powerful engine. Fueled by 91-octane gasoline fuel, the Epitome can produce 1,200 horsepower. Additionally it has a second fuel tank that can be filled with 110-octane gasoline fuel, which can up it to 1,750 Horsepower. The body is made of carbon fiber. The car weighs 2,800 pounds.

The Epitome gained media attention. With a $2 million price tag, it was dubbed the most expensive car on the market. Hip-hop artist French Montana bought one of the nine models planned for production.

=== Sahara ===
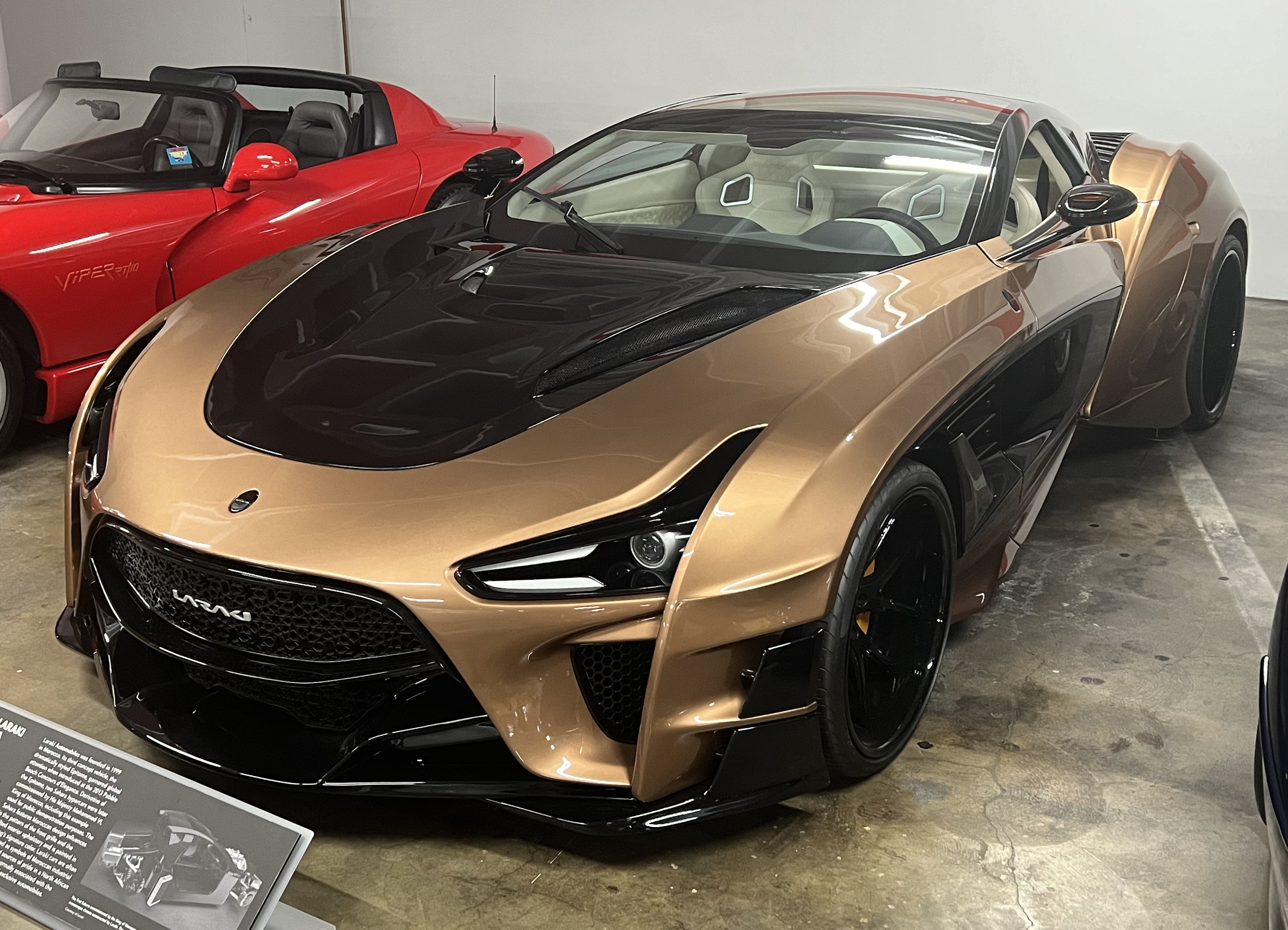
2019 Laraki Sahara at the Petersen Automotive Museum

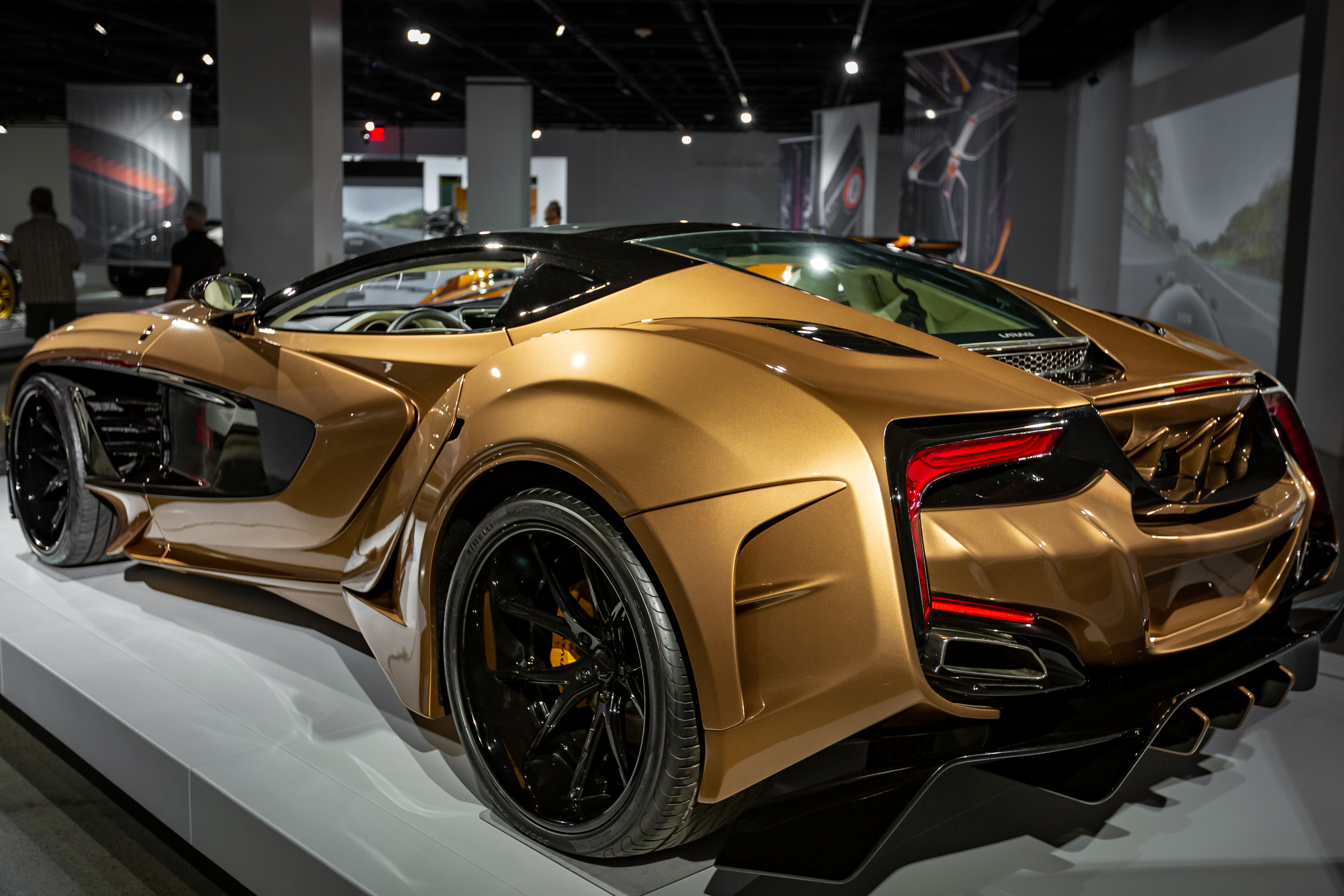
Laraki Sahara rear

The Laraki Sahara was unveiled in Morocco in 2019. Two examples are planned to be built.

Fitted with the V8 engine from a Z06 Chevrolet Corvette, Laraki added twin turbochargers to the engine. Fueled by 91-octane gasoline fuel, the Epitome can reportedly produce 1,200 horsepower. Additionally it has a second fuel tank that can be filled with 110-octane gasoline fuel, which can increase power up to 1,750 horsepower. The body is made of carbon fiber, and the car weighs 2,800 pounds.

The Sahara attracted media attention with its price tag exceeding $2 million, earning it a reputation as one of the most expensive cars on the market. In February 2025, King Mohammed VI of Morocco purchased two units of the exclusive model.
