= Antsirabe I District =

Antsirabe I
- District
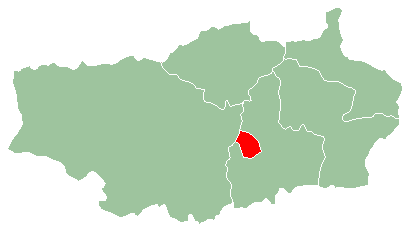
- Location of Antsirabe in Vakinankaratra

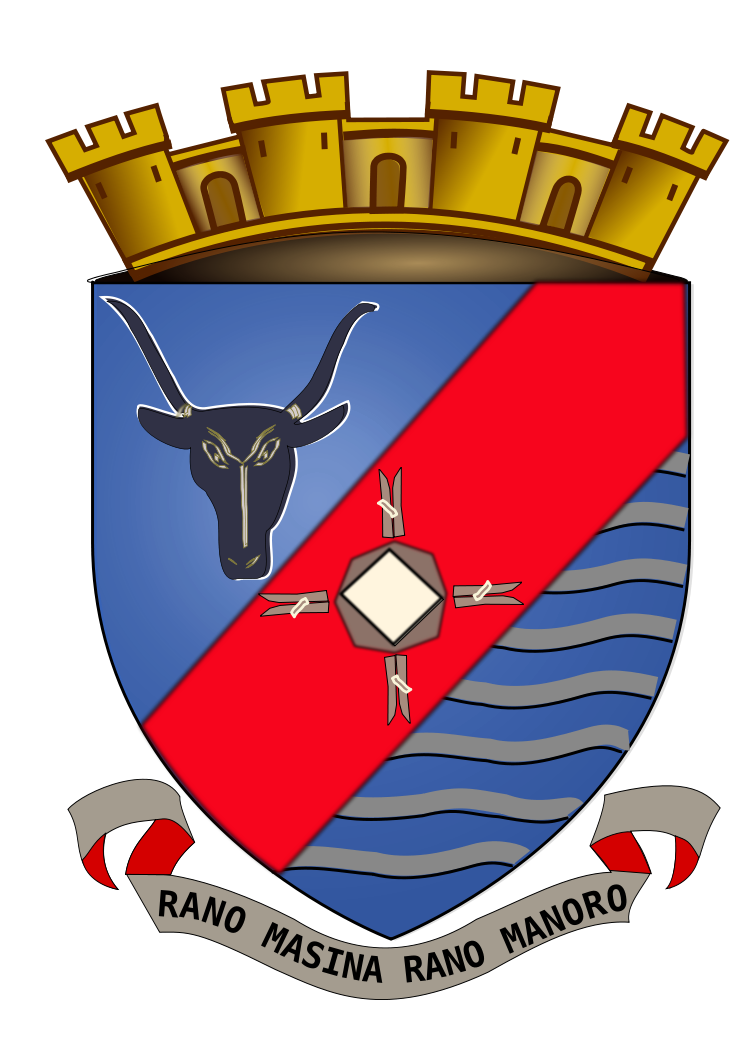
- Coat of arms

- Location of Antsirabe in Madagascar
- Coordinates: 19°52′S 47°02′E
- Country: Madagascar
- Region: Vakinankaratra
- District: Antsirabe I District
- Founded: 1872

Government
  - Mayor: Honoré Gabriel Rasaminmanana

Area
  - Total: 180 km^{2} (69 sq mi)
- Elevation: 1,500 m (4,900 ft)

Population (2018 census)
  - Total: 265,018
  - Density: 1,500/km^{2} (3,800/sq mi)
- Climate: Cwb

Antsirabe I is a district in, and capital of, Vakinankaratra Region, Madagascar. The borders of the district are identical to those of the city and urban commune of Antsirabe.

The urban district of Antsirabe I borders the district of Betafo to the west and the rural district of Antsirabe II to the north, east and south. Antsirabe I had an estimated population of 265,018 in 2015.

== Etymology and names ==
The Malagasy name Antsirabe literally means "the place of much salt".

The city has the nicknames ville d'eau ('city of water' in French) and visy gasy or le Vichy malgache ('the Malagasy Vichy' in Malagasy and French respectively), referring to the presence of multiple thermal springs in the area.

== History ==
The area where Antsirabe is found today was part of the Kingdom of Andrantsay which existed from the early 1600s until it was incorporated into the Imerina kingdom in the early 1800s. The area was a farming region, with production of rice, vegetables and fruit.

The first Norwegian (Lutheran) missionaries arrived in 1868. Limestone and sulphur were exploited in the area at this time.

The city was founded by Norwegian missionary T.G. Rosaas in 1872 as a hill station to serve as a retreat centre because of the much cooler climate. The thermal baths were opened in 1917.

In 1886 the Norwegian mission established the leper hospital of Ambohipiantrana and it quickly developed into a village for lepers. The colonial government decided to make it the leper hospital of Vakinankaratra and the around 950 people with the illness lived there in 1904.

During the French colonial rule the centre of the Vakinankaratra region shifted from the Andrantsay capital of Fivavahana to Antsirabe.

In 1921 it succeeded Betafó as the seat of a Catholic (pre-diocesan) Apostolic vicariate, and was promoted to a bishopric in 1955.

== Population ==
=== Languages ===
The majority of the population belongs to the Merina ethnic group, which speaks a highland dialect of Malagasy. As in other urban areas of Madagascar, French is widely understood.

== Places of worship ==
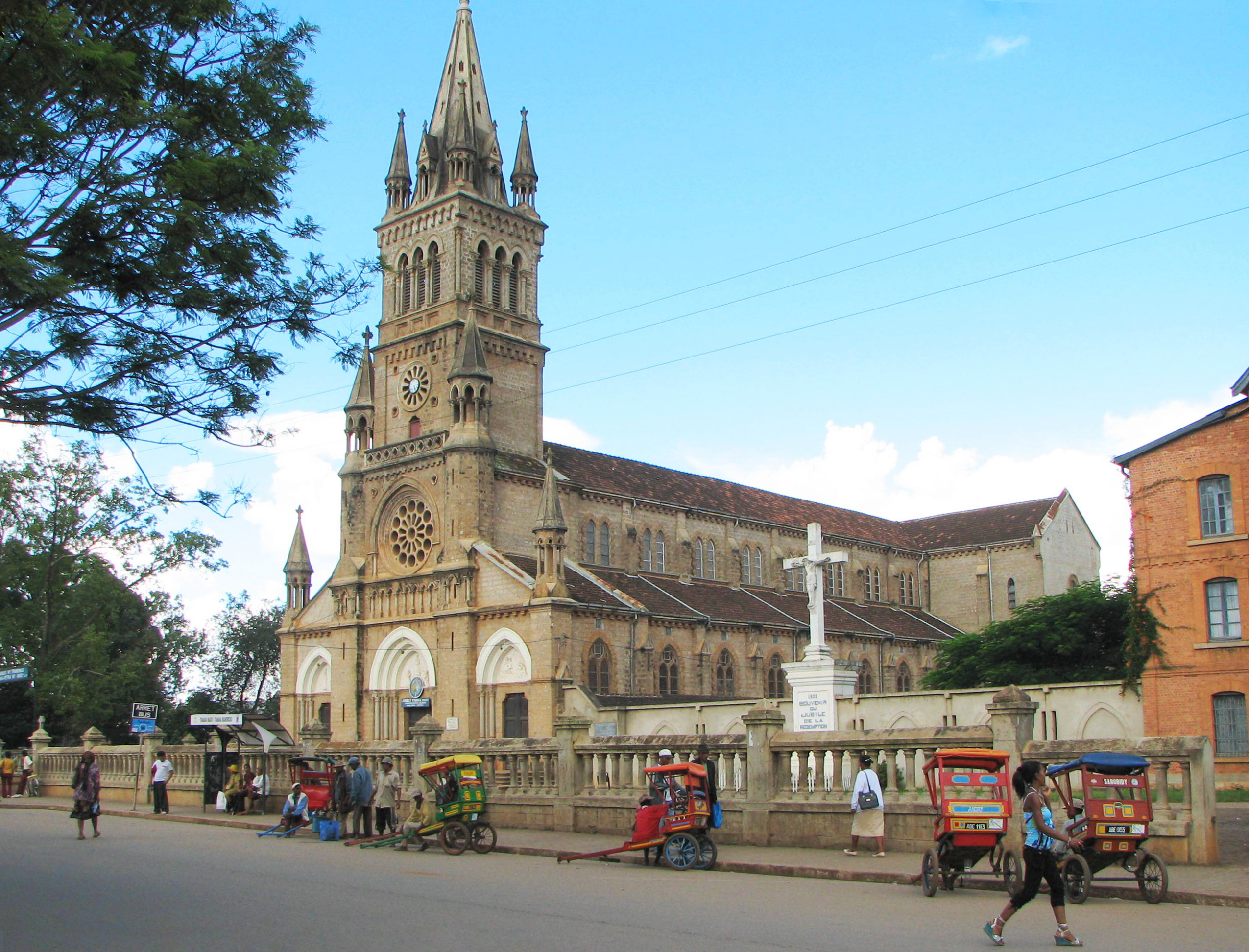
The Antsirabe Cathedral

The places of worship, are predominantly Christian churches and temples; Church of Jesus Christ in Madagascar (World Communion of Reformed Churches), Malagasy Lutheran Church (Lutheran World Federation), Assemblies of God, Association of Bible Baptist Churches in Madagascar (Baptist World Alliance), Roman Catholic Diocese of Antsirabe (Catholic Church seated in the Cathedral of Our Lady of La Salette). There are also Muslim mosques.

== Government ==
Antsirabe is an urban commune or municipality (kaominina). The borders of the commune are identical with those of the Antsirabe I District. Antsirabe is also the capital of the Vakinankaratra region.

Since April 2012, the city is governed by a "Special Delegation" with three members: Razafindrainiony Lala Marie Béryl, the previous Head of Antsirabe I District is President of the Special Delegation while Randrianarison Olivier from the TIM party and Rakotomalala Olivier from the AS party are First and Second Deputy presidents, respectively.

Between November 2011 and April 2012 the position of the Mayor of Antsirabe was vacant. Olga Ramalason of the TIM party was Mayor until she was appointed Minister of Commerce in Omer Beriziky's government of consensus in November 2011.

The city council was elected in November 2003.

== Architecture ==
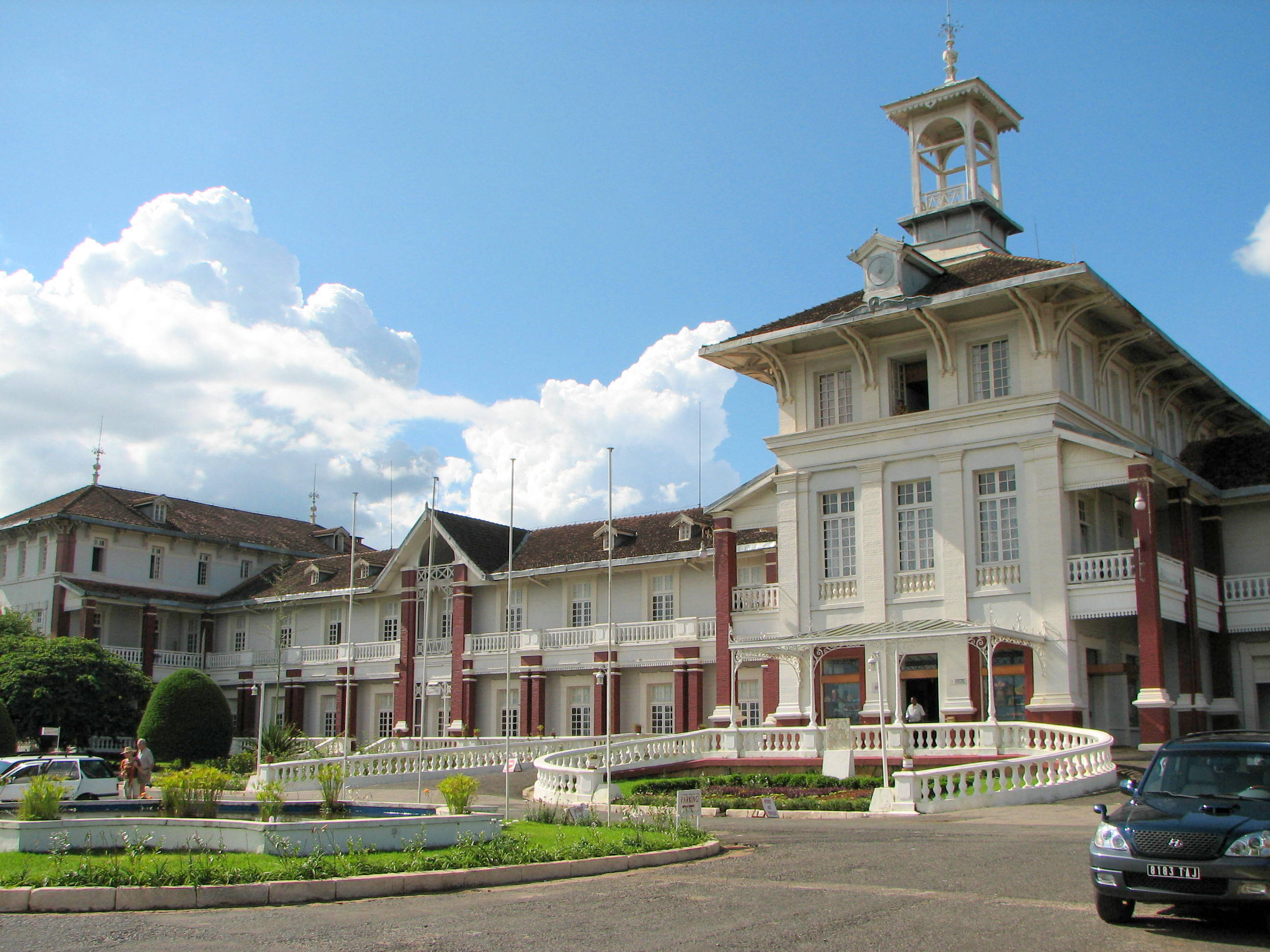
Hôtel des Thermes

Several buildings in central Antsirabe date back to the first decades of the 20th century. These include the thermal bath centre (opened in 1917), Hôtel des Thermes (1922), the railway station (1923), and the residence for French retirees (1934).

Other sights are la Stèle de l'Indépendance (the Stele of Independence) on Independence Avenue and the two public markets: Antsenakely ("The Small Market") and the bigger Asabotsy.

== Geography and climate ==
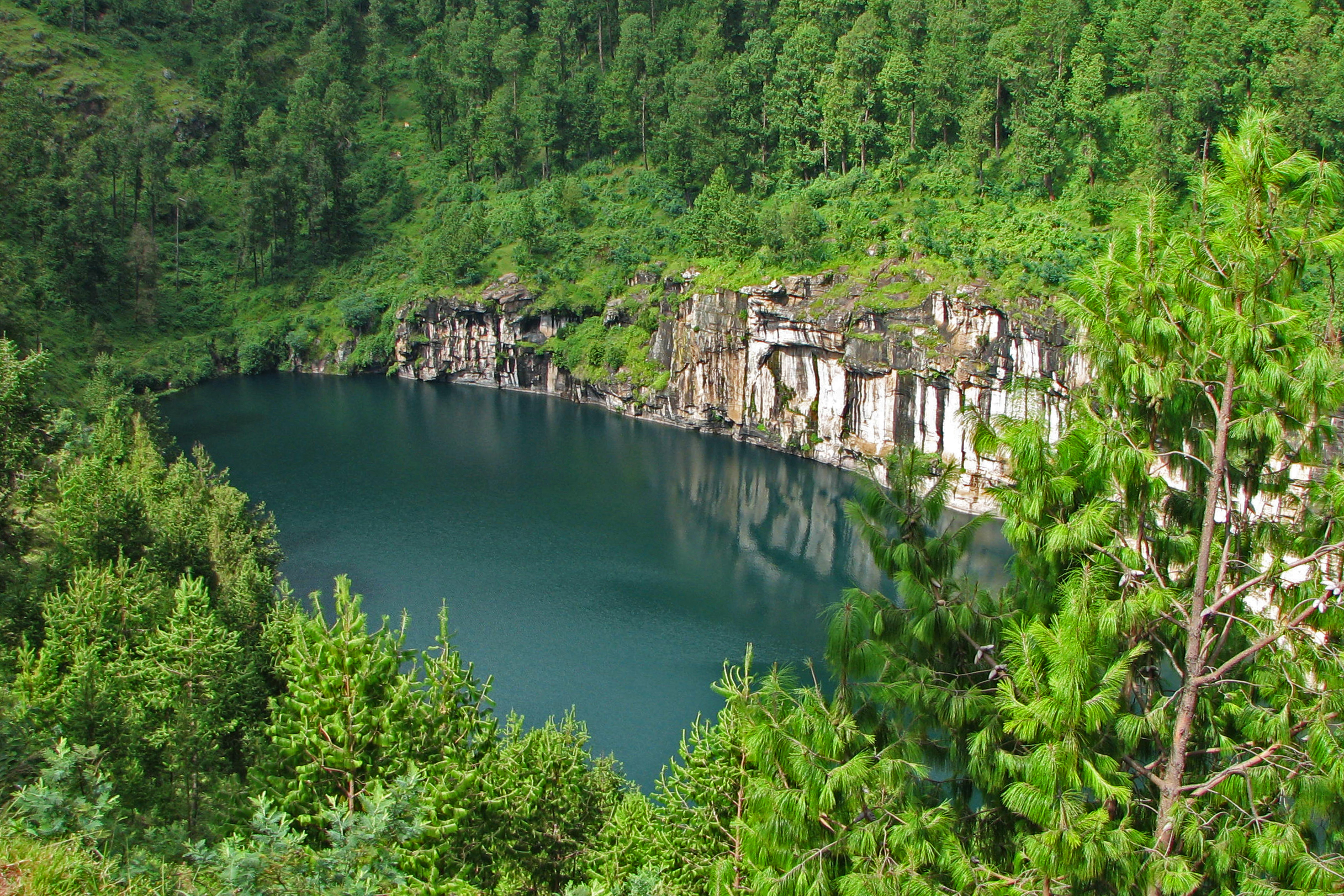
Lake Tritriva

Antsirabe is situated at an altitude of about 1,500 m (4,900 ft), making its subtropical highland climate (Köppen: Cwb), similar to Brazilian high cities of the southeast. During the winter the temperature can fall below 0 °C (32 °F) at night.

May to September form the coldest and driest part of the year with average monthly temperatures between 14 °C (57 °F) and 17 °C (63 °F) and an average number of days with precipitation per month of 1–2. From November to March the climate is warmer and wetter with on average 12 to 17 days with precipitation per month and average temperature of approximately 20 °C (68 °F). April and October have average temperatures of 19.2 °C (66.6 °F) and 18.5 °C (65.3 °F) respectively and 5–6 days of rain.

The Ankaratra volcanic field covers an area about 100 km long from Antsirabe northwards to Arivonimamo where highest peak reaches 2,644 m (8,675 ft). This volcanic field is "the most prominent and volcanologically diverse (sic) on Madagascar". Several water-filled craters are found in the area around Antsirabe, including Lake Tritriva to the south-west. There are hot springs which are utilised by the Ranomafana thermal bath in the city.

The Mania River is south of Antsirabe.

Climate data for Antsirabe
Month	Jan	Feb	Mar	Apr	May	Jun	Jul	Aug	Sep	Oct	Nov	Dec	Year
Mean daily maximum °C (°F)	24.9 (76.8)	25 (77)	24.4 (75.9)	23.8 (74.8)	21.8 (71.2)	19.7 (67.5)	19.3 (66.7)	20.4 (68.7)	23.3 (73.9)	25.5 (77.9)	26.1 (79.0)	25.1 (77.2)	23.3 (73.9)
Daily mean °C (°F)	19.6 (67.3)	19.7 (67.5)	19.1 (66.4)	17.7 (63.9)	15.3 (59.5)	13.1 (55.6)	12.7 (54.9)	13.3 (55.9)	15.6 (60.1)	17.7 (63.9)	19.2 (66.6)	19.5 (67.1)	16.9 (62.4)
Mean daily minimum °C (°F)	14.4 (57.9)	14.4 (57.9)	13.9 (57.0)	11.7 (53.1)	8.8 (47.8)	6.6 (43.9)	6.2 (43.2)	6.3 (43.3)	7.9 (46.2)	10 (50)	12.3 (54.1)	13.9 (57.0)	10.5 (50.9)
Average precipitation mm (inches)	298 (11.7)	243 (9.6)	191 (7.5)	90 (3.5)	31 (1.2)	13 (0.5)	12 (0.5)	11 (0.4)	28 (1.1)	68 (2.7)	147 (5.8)	249 (9.8)	1,381 (54.3)
Source: Climate-Data.org (altitude: 1507m)

== Economy ==
Textile (COTONA, Cottonline, Aquarelle), Beverages (Star Brasseries, Malto), Food industry (SOCOLAIT, Tsarafy), Tobacco (SACIMEM), Mineral water (Sté. des Eaux Minerales, Ravovisy), soap production (Soba).

An Export Processing Zone is located in Antsirabe and the town is the home of several factories, including Star Brasseries (beverages), Cotona (textiles) and Kobama (grain).

== Infrastructure ==
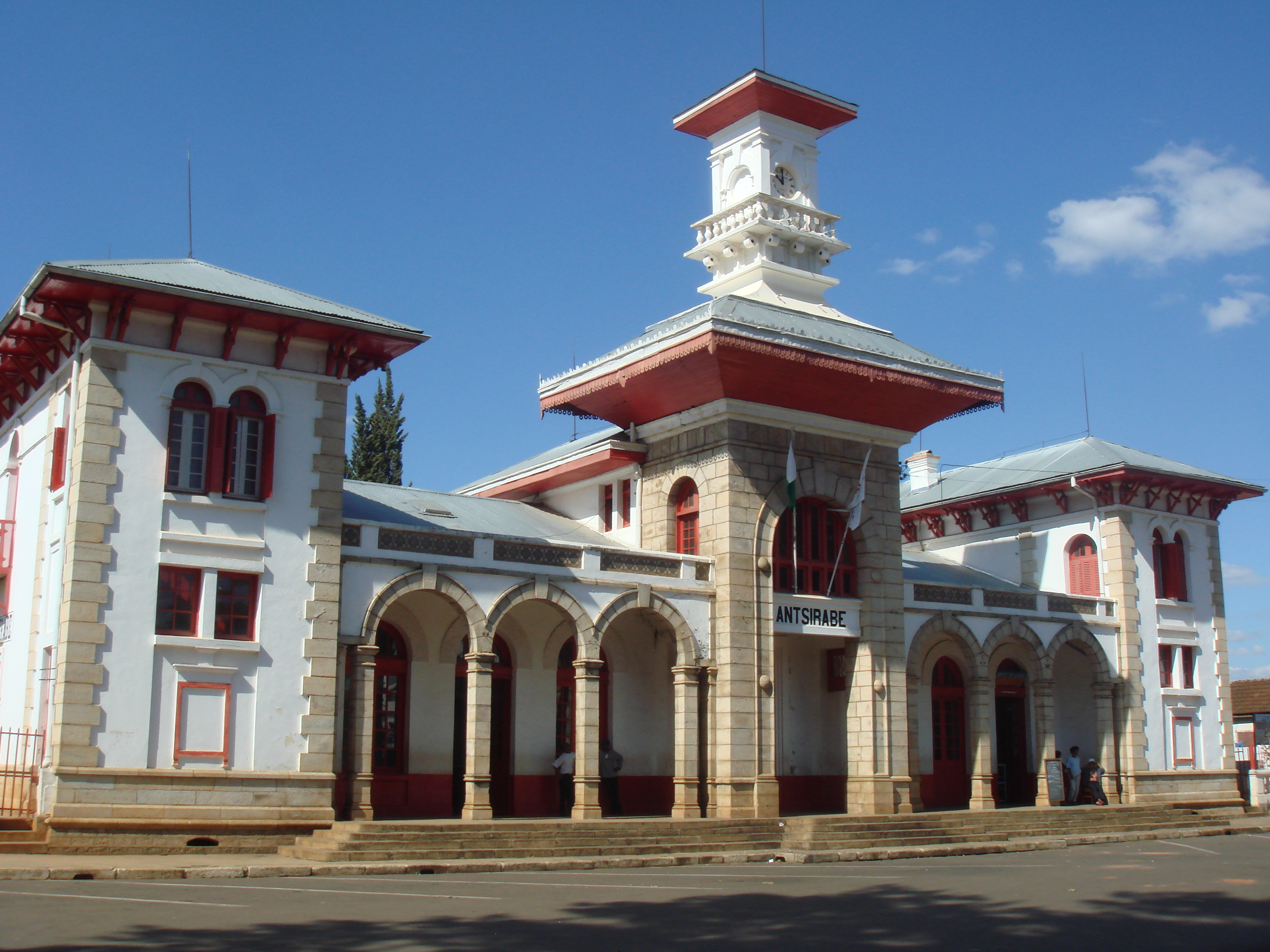
Train station

The city is at the end of the TA (Tananarive-Antsirabe) railway line, part of the Network North railway, which links Antsirabe to the capital and the port city of Toamasina. The line is operated by Madarail, currently only with freight trains. The line has been extended southwards through Vinaninkarena, but this extension is not in use.

National road 7 (RN7) connects the city to Antananarivo in the north and to Fianarantsoa and Toliara to the south. Antsirabe is connected with Morondava on the west coast through RN34 and RN 35.

Public transport to and from Antsirabe are provided by taxi-brousses (share taxis) and buses. Most taxi-brousses operate from the main bus station in the north of the city.

Within the city public transport consists of small buses and numerous pulled rickshaws ("pousse-pousse"), as well as cycle rickshaw ("cyclo-pousse"), auto rickshaw ("touktouks") and private taxis. The pousse-pousse is something of an emblem of the city; 5600 of them were recorded in 2006.

There is also an airport.

== Sports ==
Football:

- FC Vakinankaratra
- FC Jirama Antsirabe

Basketball:

- GNBC

== Education ==
The Institute of Higher Education of Antsirabe Vakinankaratra is the regional branch of the University of Antananarivo.

== Twin cities ==
Antsirabe is twinned with:

- Vacoas-Phoenix, Mauritius
- Montluçon, France
- Levallois-Perret, France

Antsirabe has collaborations with:

- Stavanger, Norway

== Notable locals ==
- Olga Ramalason, mayor of Antsirabe (TIM) until November 2011 when she became Minister of Commerce
- Mohammed V of Morocco and his family, including the later Hassan II, lived in exile at Hôtel des Thermes in Antsirabe in 1955
- Henri de Laulanie, S.J., who developed an agricultural school for the area, where he developed a System of Rice Intensification that has spread worldwide
