= Antanimandry =

- Location within Madagascar
- Coordinates: 19°51′S 46°58′E
- Country: Madagascar
- Region: Vakinankaratra
- District: Antsirabe II

Area
  - Total: 42 km^{2} (16 sq mi)
- Elevation: 1,569 m (5,148 ft)

Population (2013)
  - Total: 12,736
  - Ethnicities: Merina
- Time zone: UTC3 (EAT)

Antanimandry is a town and commune in Madagascar. It belongs to the district of Antsirabe II, which is a part of Vakinankaratra Region, north-west from Antsirabe. The population of the commune was 12,736 in 2013 census.

It is composed by 8 villages (fokontany): Antanimandry, Ambohidrano, Masiniloharano, Andrianana, Ampahadiminy, Avaradrano, Antsongobe and Masinandraina.

Primary and junior level secondary education are available in town. The majority 99% of the population of the commune are farmers, while an additional 1% receives their livelihood from raising livestock. The most important crop is rice, while other important products are beans, maize and potatoes.
