= Manandona =

Manandona Manandona
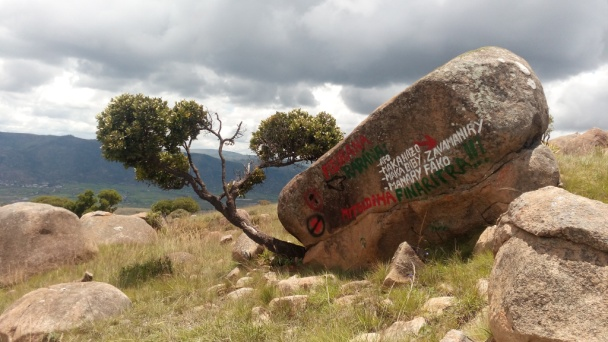
- Mont Ibity at Manandona

- Location in Madagascar
- Coordinates: 20°3′S 47°4′E
- Country: Madagascar
- Region: Vakinankaratra
- District: Antsirabe II

Area
  - Total: 282 km^{2} (109 sq mi)
- Elevation: 1,605 m (5,266 ft)

Population (2015)
  - Total: 15,000
  - Ethnicities: Merina
- Time zone: UTC3 (EAT)

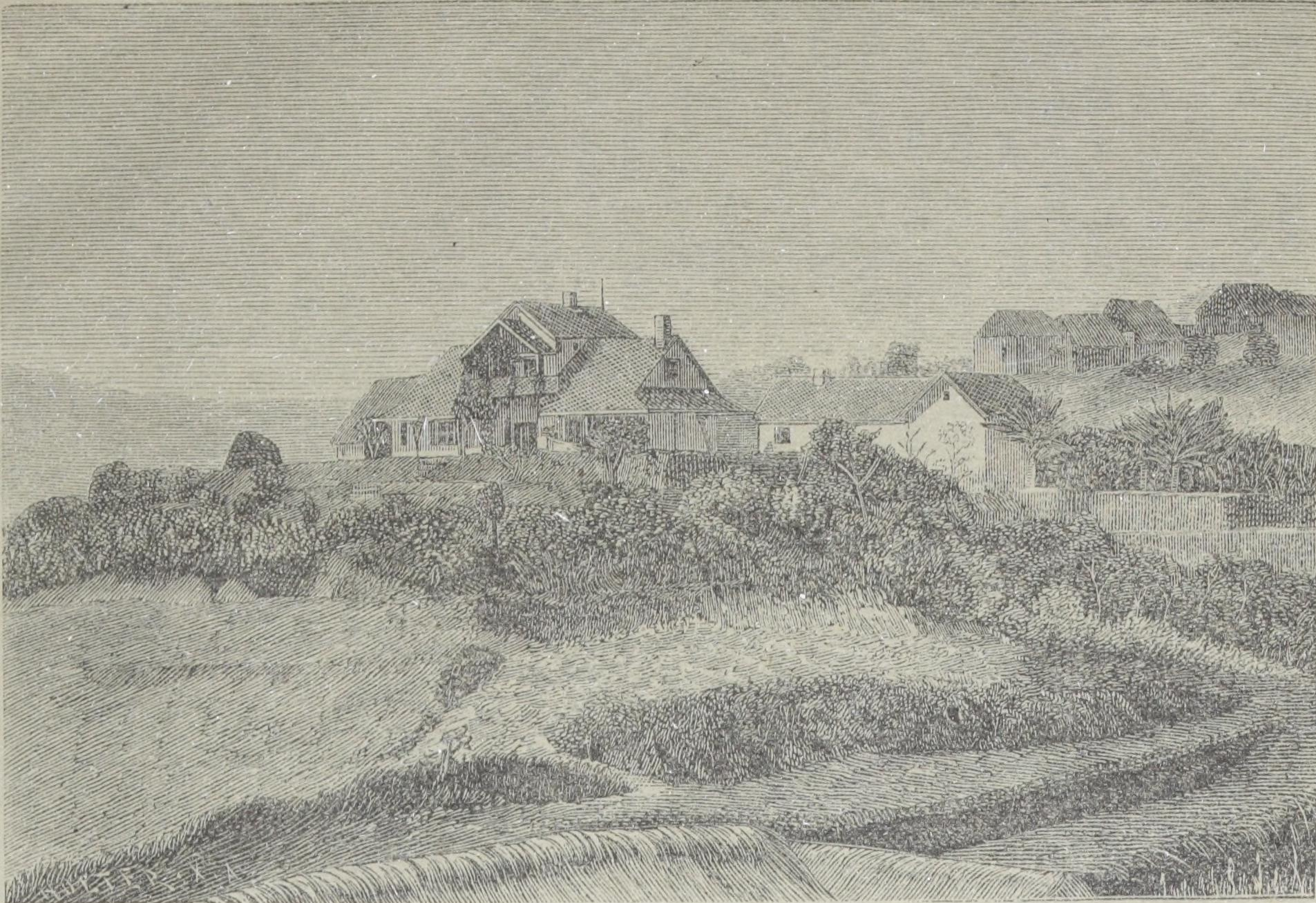
Manandoana in 1885.

Manandona is a town and commune in Madagascar. It belongs to the district of Antsirabe II, which is a part of Vakinankaratra Region. The population of the commune was estimated to be approximately 15,000. It is constituted by 11 fokontany (villages), of which 2 are located in the mountains.

== Geography ==
It is situated at 200 km south of the capital Antananarivo and about 23 km south of Antsirabe on the Route nationale 7 (Madagascar). The Manandona river flows by this town. Highest Point of the commune is the Mont Ibity with 2250m.

Primary and junior level secondary education are available in town. The majority 90% of the population of the commune are farmers, while an additional 10% receives their livelihood from raising livestock. The most important crops are rice and barley, while other important agricultural products are wheat and potatoes.
