= Ambatomena, Antsirabe II =

Ambatomena
- Location in Madagascar
- Coordinates: 19°51′S 47°15′E
- Country: Madagascar
- Region: Vakinankaratra
- District: Antsirabe II
- Elevation: 1,734 m (5,689 ft)

Population (2001)
  - Total: 19,000
  - Ethnicities: Merina
- Time zone: UTC3 (EAT)

Ambatomena is a town and commune in Madagascar. It belongs to the district of Antsirabe II, which is a part of Vakinankaratra Region. The population of the commune was estimated to be approximately 19,000 in 2001 commune census.

Primary and junior level secondary education are available in town. It is also a site of industrial-scale mining. The majority 87.8% of the population of the commune are farmers, while an additional 10% receives their livelihood from raising livestock. The most important crops are rice and fruits, while other important agricultural products are beans, maize and potatoes. Industry and services provide employment for 0.2% and 2% of the population, respectively.
