= Sahanivotry Mandona =

- Location in Madagascar
- Coordinates: 20°7′S 47°5′E
- Country: Madagascar
- Region: Vakinankaratra
- District: Antsirabe II
- Elevation: 1,469 m (4,820 ft)

Population (2001)
  - Total: 10,000
  - Ethnicities: Merina
- Time zone: UTC3 (EAT)

Sahanivotry Mandona is a town and commune in Madagascar. It belongs to the district of Antsirabe II, which is a part of Vakinankaratra Region. The population of the commune was estimated to be approximately 10,000 in 2001 commune census.

Primary and junior level secondary education are available in town. It is also a site of industrial-scale mining. The majority 80% of the population of the commune are farmers, while an additional 18% receives their livelihood from raising livestock. The most important crop is rice, while other important products are maize and cassava. Industry and services provide both employment for 1% of the population.
