= Andranomanelatra =

- Location in Madagascar
- Coordinates: 19°47′S 47°6′E
- Country: Madagascar
- Region: Vakinankaratra
- District: Antsirabe II
- Elevation: 1,613 m (5,292 ft)

Population (2001)
  - Total: 30,000
  - Ethnicities: Merina
- Time zone: UTC3 (EAT)

Andranomanelatra is a town and commune in Madagascar. It belongs to the district of Antsirabe II, which is a part of Vakinankaratra Region. The population of the commune was estimated to be approximately 30,000 in 2001 commune census.

Primary and junior level secondary education are available in town. The majority 63.5% of the population of the commune are farmers, while an additional 35% receives their livelihood from raising livestock. The most important crops are rice and maize, while other important agricultural products are fruits, potatoes and tomato. Industry provides employment for 1.5% of the population.
