= Mandrosohasina =

- Location in Madagascar
- Coordinates: 19°35′S 47°10′E
- Country: Madagascar
- Region: Vakinankaratra
- District: Antsirabe II
- Established: 1996
- Elevation: 1,662 m (5,453 ft)

Population (2001)
  - Total: 20,000
  - Ethnicities: Merina
- Time zone: UTC3 (EAT)
- Postal code: 110

Mandrosohasina is a municipality in Madagascar. It belongs to the district of Antsirabe II, which is a part of Vakinankaratra Region. The population of the commune was estimated to be approximately 20,000 in 2001 commune census.

Only primary schooling is available. The majority 99% of the population of the commune are farmers, while an additional 1% receives their livelihood from raising livestock. The most important crops are rice and potatoes; also vegetables are an important agricultural product.

== Roads ==
Mandrosohasina is at the crossroad of the National road 7 and the National road 43.
