= Ambohitsimanova =

- Location in Madagascar
- Coordinates: 19°57′S 47°7′E
- Country: Madagascar
- Region: Vakinankaratra
- District: Antsirabe II
- Elevation: 1,574 m (5,164 ft)

Population (2001)
  - Total: 17,000
  - Ethnicities: Merina
- Time zone: UTC3 (EAT)

Ambohitsimanova is a town and commune in Madagascar. It belongs to the district of Antsirabe II, which is a part of Vakinankaratra Region. The population of the commune was estimated to be approximately 17,000 in 2001 commune census.

Only primary schooling is available. The majority 95% of the population of the commune are farmers, while an additional 5% receives their livelihood from raising livestock. The most important crop is rice, while other important products are maize and potatoes.
