= Belazao =

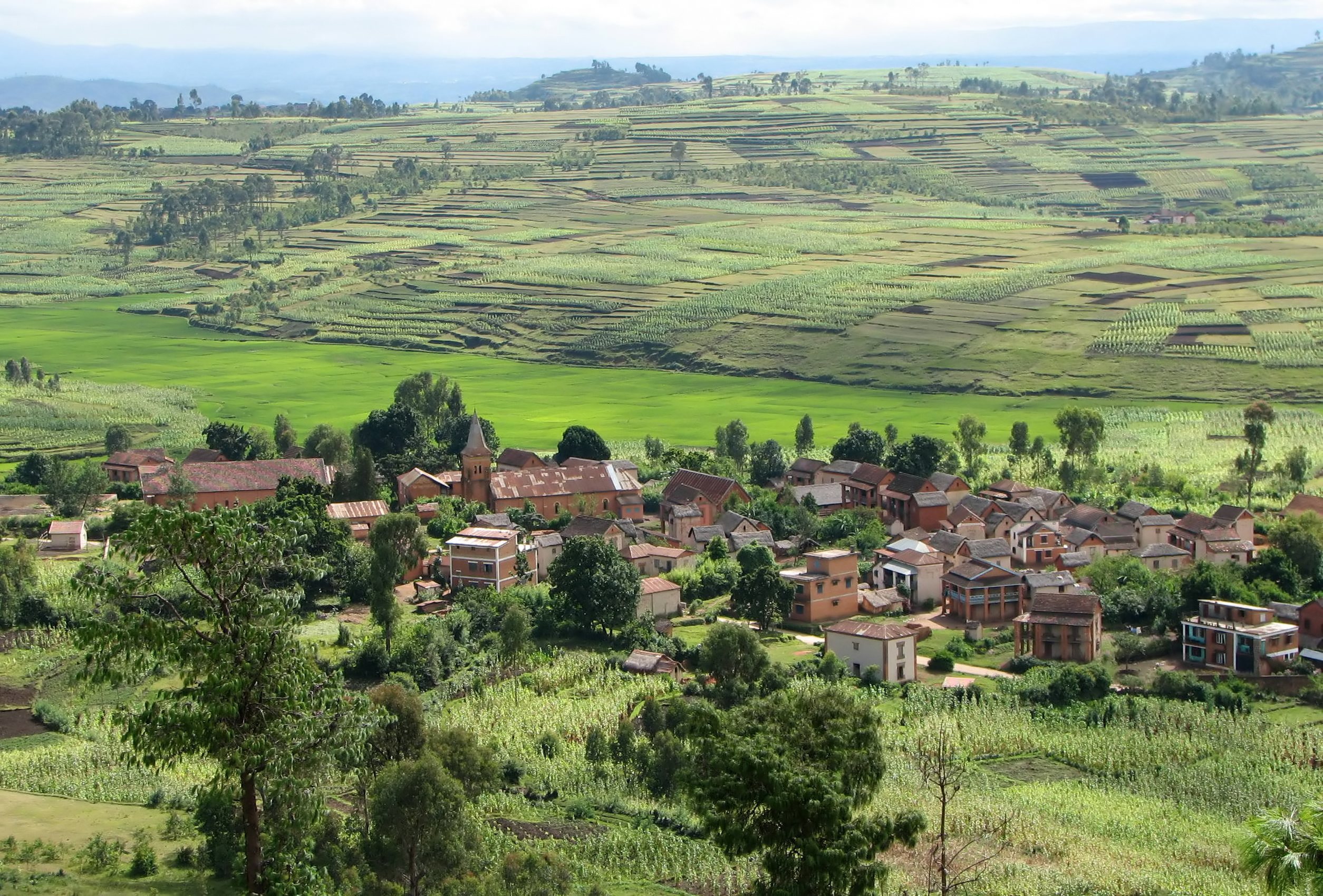

- Location in Madagascar
- Coordinates: 19°53′S 46°58′E
- Country: Madagascar
- Region: Vakinankaratra
- District: Antsirabe II
- Elevation: 1,545 m (5,069 ft)

Population (2018)
  - Total: 14,332
  - Ethnicities: Merina
- Time zone: UTC3 (EAT)

Belazao is a town and commune in Madagascar. It belongs to the district of Antsirabe II, which is a part of Vakinankaratra Region. The population of the commune was estimated to be 14,332 in 2018. Belazao is located near the lake Tritriva.

Primary and junior level secondary education are available in town. The majority 85% of the population of the commune are farmers, while an additional 15% receives their livelihood from raising livestock. The most important crop is potatoes, while other important products are maize, rice and soya.

== History ==
The first settlers of present-day Belazao were the Merina peoples. Despite being a small old town set within a backdrop of cultivated rice fields, it currently functions as an agro-town for its source of farming.
