= Ibity =

- Location in Madagascar
- Coordinates: 20°7′S 47°1′E
- Country: Madagascar
- Region: Vakinankaratra
- District: Antsirabe II
- Elevation: 2,006 m (6,581 ft)

Population (2001)
  - Total: 11,000
  - Ethnicities: Merina
- Time zone: UTC3 (EAT)

Ibity is a town and commune in Madagascar. It belongs to the district of Antsirabe II, which is a part of Vakinankaratra Region. The population of the commune was estimated to be approximately 11,000 in 2001 commune census.

Only primary schooling is available. The majority 98% of the population of the commune are farmers, while an additional 1% receives their livelihood from raising livestock. The most important crop is maize, while other important products are peanuts, beans, cassava and rice. Industry provides employment for 1% of the population.
