= Ambano =

- Location in Madagascar
- Coordinates: 19°48′S 47°2′E
- Country: Madagascar
- Region: Vakinankaratra
- District: Antsirabe II
- Elevation: 1,560 m (5,120 ft)

Population (2001)
  - Total: 32,000
  - Ethnicities: Merina
- Time zone: UTC3 (EAT)

Ambano is a town and commune in Madagascar. It belongs to the district of Antsirabe II, which is a part of Vakinankaratra Region. The population of the commune was estimated to be approximately 32,000 in the 2001 commune census.

Primary and junior secondary education are available in the town. About 95% of the population are farmers, while the remaining 5% earn their livelihood from livestock raising. The main crops are vegetables and fruits, including citrus and potatoes.
