= Mangatano =

- Location in Madagascar
- Coordinates: 19°57′S 46°58′E
- Country: Madagascar
- Region: Vakinankaratra
- District: Antsirabe II
- Elevation: 1,652 m (5,420 ft)

Population (2001)
  - Total: 8,000
  - Ethnicities: Merina
- Time zone: UTC3 (EAT)

Mangatano or Mangarano is a town and commune in Madagascar. It belongs to the district of Antsirabe II, which is a part of Vakinankaratra Region. The population of the commune was estimated to be approximately 8,000 in 2001 commune census.

Primary and junior level secondary education are available in town. The majority 95% of the population of the commune are farmers, while an additional 5% receives their livelihood from raising livestock. The most important crops are rice and potatoes; also maize is an important agricultural product.
