= Antsirabe II District =

Antsirabe II
- District
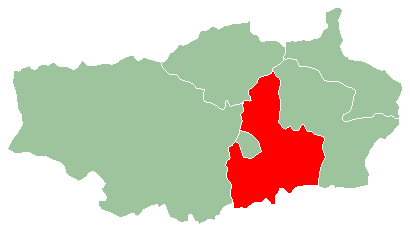
- Location of the district within the region of Vakinankaratra.
- Coordinates: 19°52′08″S 47°08′54″E
- Country: Madagascar
- Region: Vakinankaratra

Area
  - Total: 2,471.31 km^{2} (954.18 sq mi)

Population (2020)
  - Total: 475,556
  - Density: 192.431/km^{2} (498.393/sq mi)

Antsirabe II is a rural district in Vakinankaratra Region, Madagascar. The district surrounds the urban district and city of Antsirabe. It also borders the district of Faratsiho to the north, Antanifotsy to the east and Betafo to the west, in addition to the region of Antanifotsy to the south. The district covers a total area of 2,471.31 km^{2}, with a population estimated at 475,556 in 2020. It is situated on the National Road No.7.

== Communes ==
The district is further divided into 20 communes:

- Alakamisy
- Ambano
- Ambatomena
- Ambohibary
- Ambohidranandriana
- Ambohimiarivo
- Ambohitsimanova
- Andranomanelatra
- Antanambao
- Antanimandry
- Antsoatany
- Belazao
- Ibity
- Manandoana
- Mandrosohasina
- Mangatano
- Sahanivotry Mandona
- Soanindrariny
- Tsarahonenana Sahanivotry
- Vinaninkarena
