= Alakamisy, Antsirabe II =

Alakamisy
- Location in Madagascar
- Coordinates: 20°12′S 47°19′E
- Country: Madagascar
- Region: Vakinankaratra
- District: Antsirabe II
- Elevation: 1,394 m (4,573 ft)

Population (2001)
  - Total: 18,000
- Time zone: UTC3 (EAT)

Alakamisy is a town and commune in Madagascar. It belongs to the district of Antsirabe II, which is a part of Vakinankaratra region. The population of the commune was estimated to be approximately 18,000 in 2001 commune census.

Only primary schooling is available. The majority 92 percent of the population of the commune are farmers, while an additional 8 percent receives their livelihood from raising livestock. The most important crop are vegetables, while other important products are cabbage and potatoes.
