= Ambohimiarivo =

- Location in Madagascar
- Coordinates: 19°51′S 47°9′E
- Country: Madagascar
- Region: Vakinankaratra
- District: Antsirabe II
- Elevation: 1,576 m (5,171 ft)

Population (2001)
  - Total: 10,000
  - Ethnicities: Merina
- Time zone: UTC3 (EAT)

Ambohimiarivo is a town and commune in Madagascar. It belongs to the district of Antsirabe II, which is a part of Vakinankaratra Region. The population of the commune was estimated to be approximately 10,000 in 2001 commune census.

Primary and junior level secondary education are available in town. The majority 95% of the population of the commune are farmers, while an additional 5% receives their livelihood from raising livestock. The most important crops are rice and tomato, while other important agricultural products are beans, maize and potatoes.
