= Antsoatany =

- Location in Madagascar
- Coordinates: 19°42′S 47°10′E
- Country: Madagascar
- Region: Vakinankaratra
- District: Antsirabe II
- Elevation: 1,667 m (5,469 ft)

Population (2001)
  - Total: 10,000
  - Ethnicities: Merina
- Time zone: UTC3 (EAT)

Antsoatany is a town and commune in Madagascar. It belongs to the district of Antsirabe II, which is a part of Vakinankaratra Region. The population of the commune was estimated to be approximately 10,000 in 2001 commune census.

Only primary schooling is available. The majority 97% of the population of the commune are farmers, while an additional 3% receives their livelihood from raising livestock. The most important crops are maize and rice, while other important agricultural products are beans and potatoes.
