= Akamia =

- Location: Antsirabe
- Type: Military museum

The Akamia museum is a museum located in Antsirabe, Madagascar. It is located in the Academie Militaire Antsirabe.
