= Tsarahonenana Sahanivotry =

- Location in Madagascar
- Coordinates: 19°59′S 47°19′E
- Country: Madagascar
- Region: Vakinankaratra
- District: Antsirabe II
- Elevation: 1,837 m (6,027 ft)

Population (2001)
  - Total: 14,000
  - Ethnicities: Merina
- Time zone: UTC3 (EAT)

Tsarahonenana Sahanivotry is a town and commune in Madagascar. It belongs to the district of Antsirabe II, which is a part of Vakinankaratra Region. The population of the commune was estimated to be approximately 14,000 in 2001 commune census.

Primary and junior level secondary education are available in town. The majority 98% of the population of the commune are farmers, while an additional 2% receives their livelihood from raising livestock. The most important crop are fruits, while other important products are potatoes and rice.
