= Antanambao, Antsirabe II =

Antanambao
- Location in Madagascar
- Coordinates: 19°40′S 47°20′E
- Country: Madagascar
- Region: Vakinankaratra
- District: Antsirabe II

Area
  - Total: 340 km^{2} (130 sq mi)
- Elevation: 1,593 m (5,226 ft)

Population (2001)
  - Total: 21,000
  - Ethnicities: Merina
- Time zone: UTC3 (EAT)

Antanambao is a town and commune in Madagascar. It belongs to the district of Antsirabe II, which is a part of Vakinankaratra Region. The population of the commune was estimated to be approximately 21,000 in 2001 commune census.

Primary and junior level secondary education are available in town. The majority 95% of the population of the commune are farmers, while an additional 5% receives their livelihood from raising livestock. The most important crops are rice and fruits, while other important agricultural products are maize and potatoes.
