= Ambohibary, Antsirabe II =

Ambohibary Ambohibary Sambaina
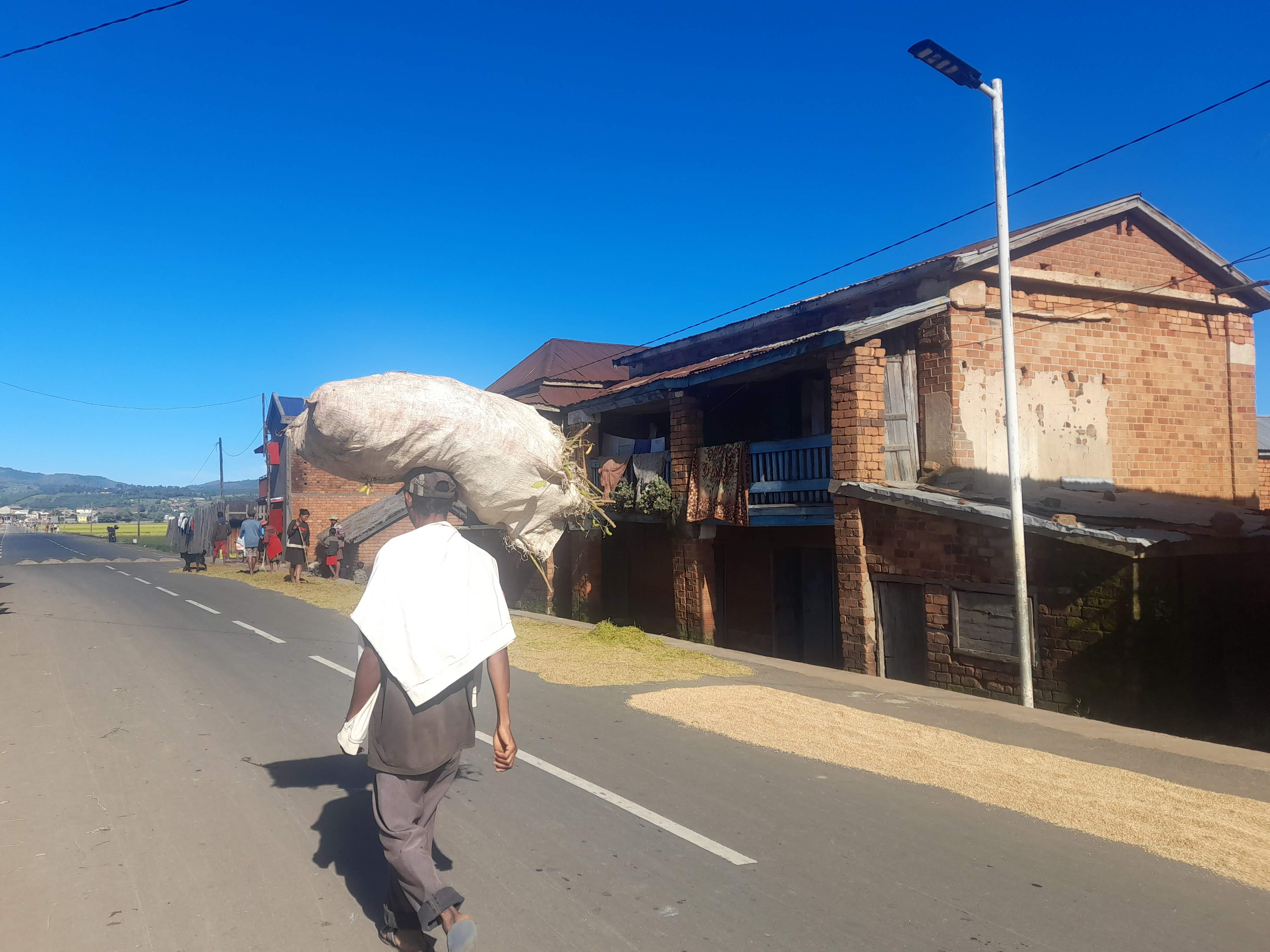
- Ambohibary

- Location in Madagascar
- Coordinates: 19°37′00″S 47°08′45″E
- Country: Madagascar
- Region: Vakinankaratra
- District: Antsirabe II
- Elevation: 1,657 m (5,436 ft)

Population (2001)
  - Total: 52,000
  - Ethnicities: Merina
- Time zone: UTC3 (EAT)
- Postal code: 110
- Climate: Cwb

Ambohibary is a municipality in Madagascar. It belongs to the district of Antsirabe II, which is a part of Vakinankaratra Region. The population of the commune was estimated to be approximately 52,000 in 2001 commune census. and is situated on the National Road No.7

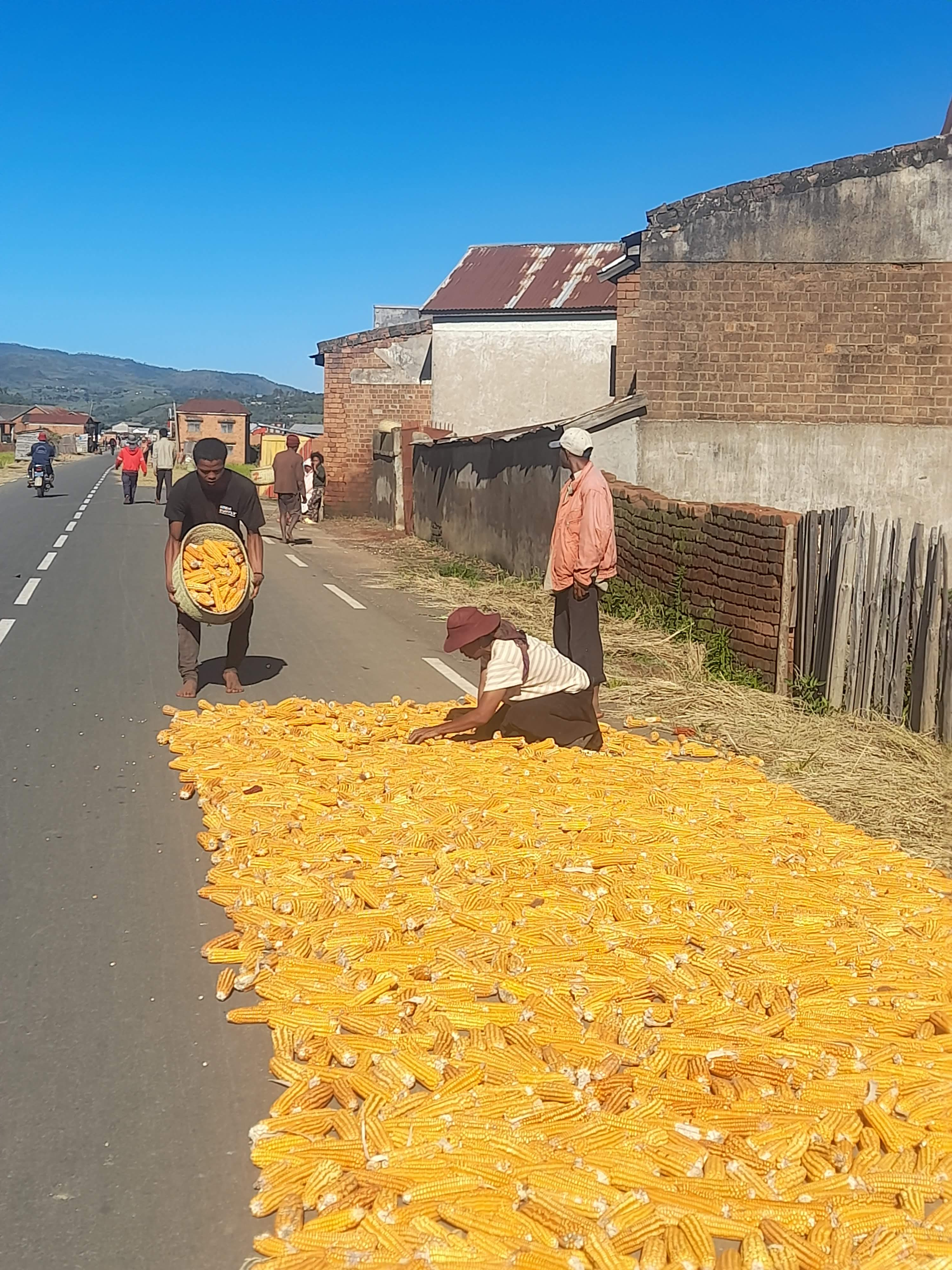
corn crop in Ambohibary

Primary and junior level secondary education are available in town. The majority 95% of the population of the commune are farmers, while an additional 5% receives their livelihood from raising livestock. The most important crop is rice, while other important products are maize and potatoes.
