= Lake Tritriva =

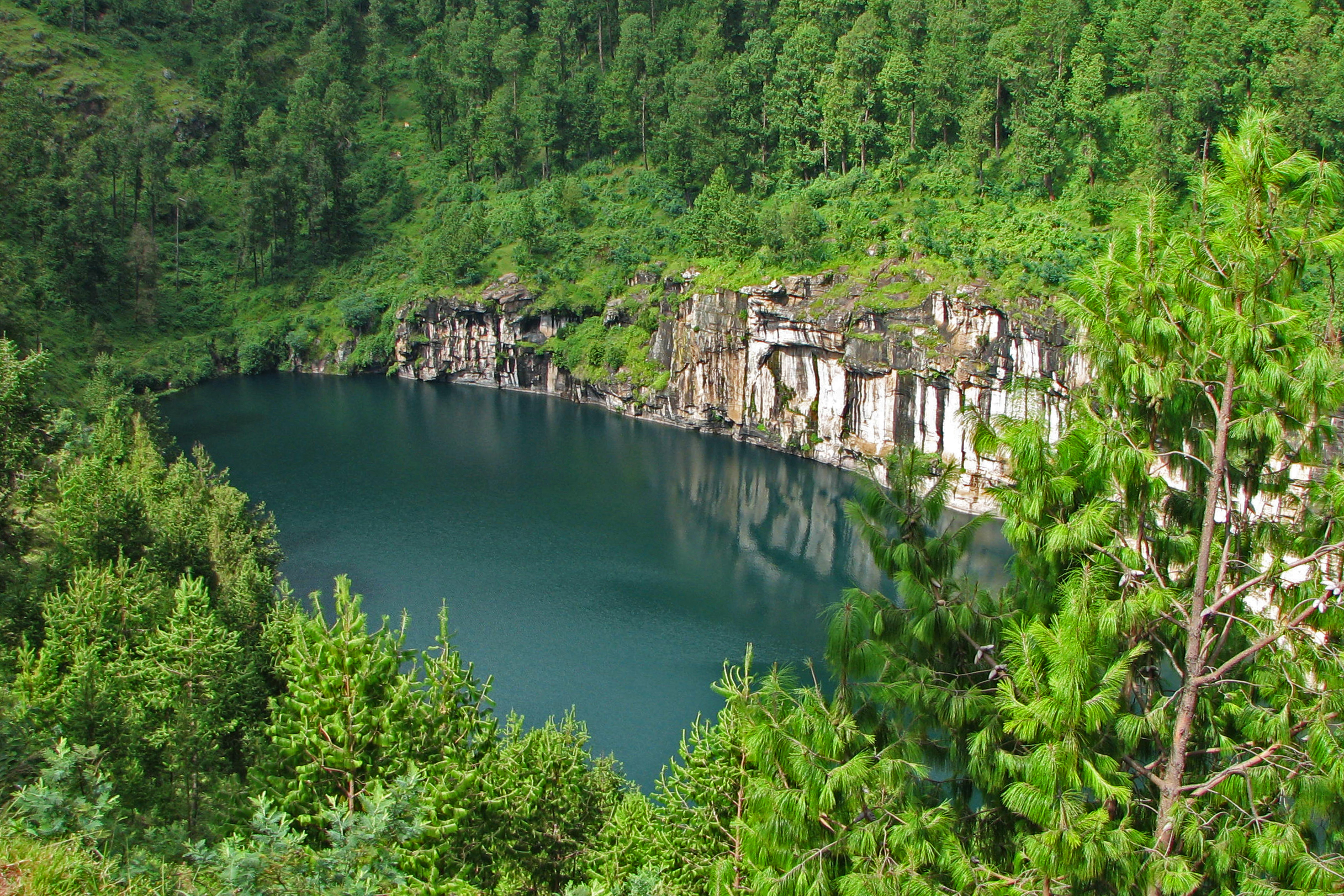

- Location within Madagascar
- Coordinates: 19.9290°S 46.9247°E
- Type: Crater lake
- Basin countries: Madagascar
- Max. length: 200 m (660 ft)
- Average depth: 80 m (260 ft)
- Max. depth: 160 m (520 ft)
- Surface elevation: 1,950 m (6,400 ft)
- Settlements: Antsirabe

Lake Tritriva is a volcanic lake in southwest-central Madagascar, in the region of Vàkinankàratra, located near the village of Belazao. In a distance of 15 km from Antsirabe, it is easy to reach by the National Road 34.

There's a strict Fady (taboo) for this lake and swimming is not allowed.

The lake fills an extinct crater in a region notable also for the presence of many hot springs. It sits in the vent of an oval volcanic cone enclosed in vertical gneiss cliffs. The rim of the cone is about 2,000 m (6,600 ft) above sea level, while the surface of the lake is approximately 50 m (160 ft) below the rim. The lake's water level drops during the rainy season and rises when the monsoon rains have ceased.

The lake is up to 160 m (520 ft) deep, making it Madagascar's deepest lake.

== Gallery ==
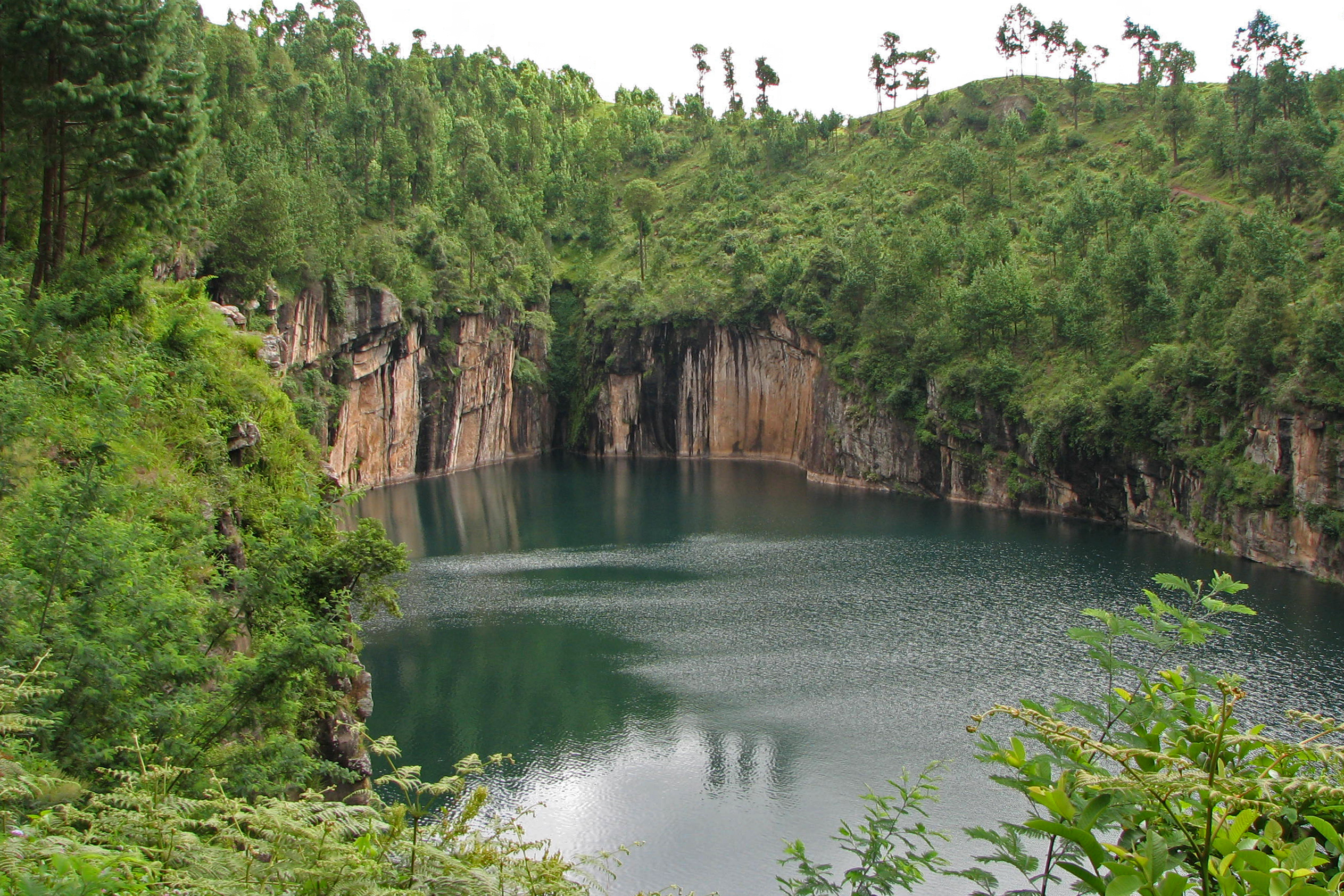

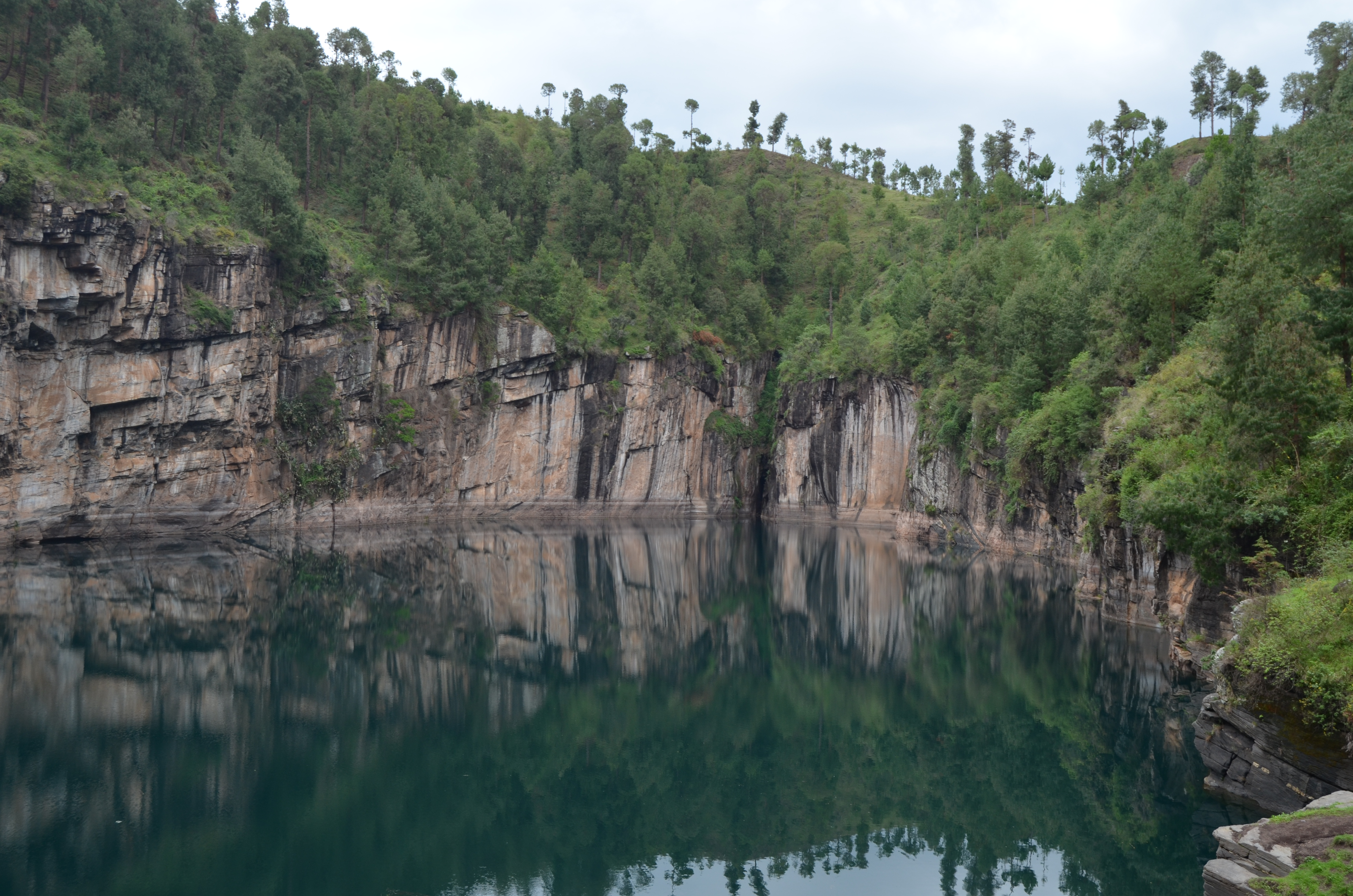

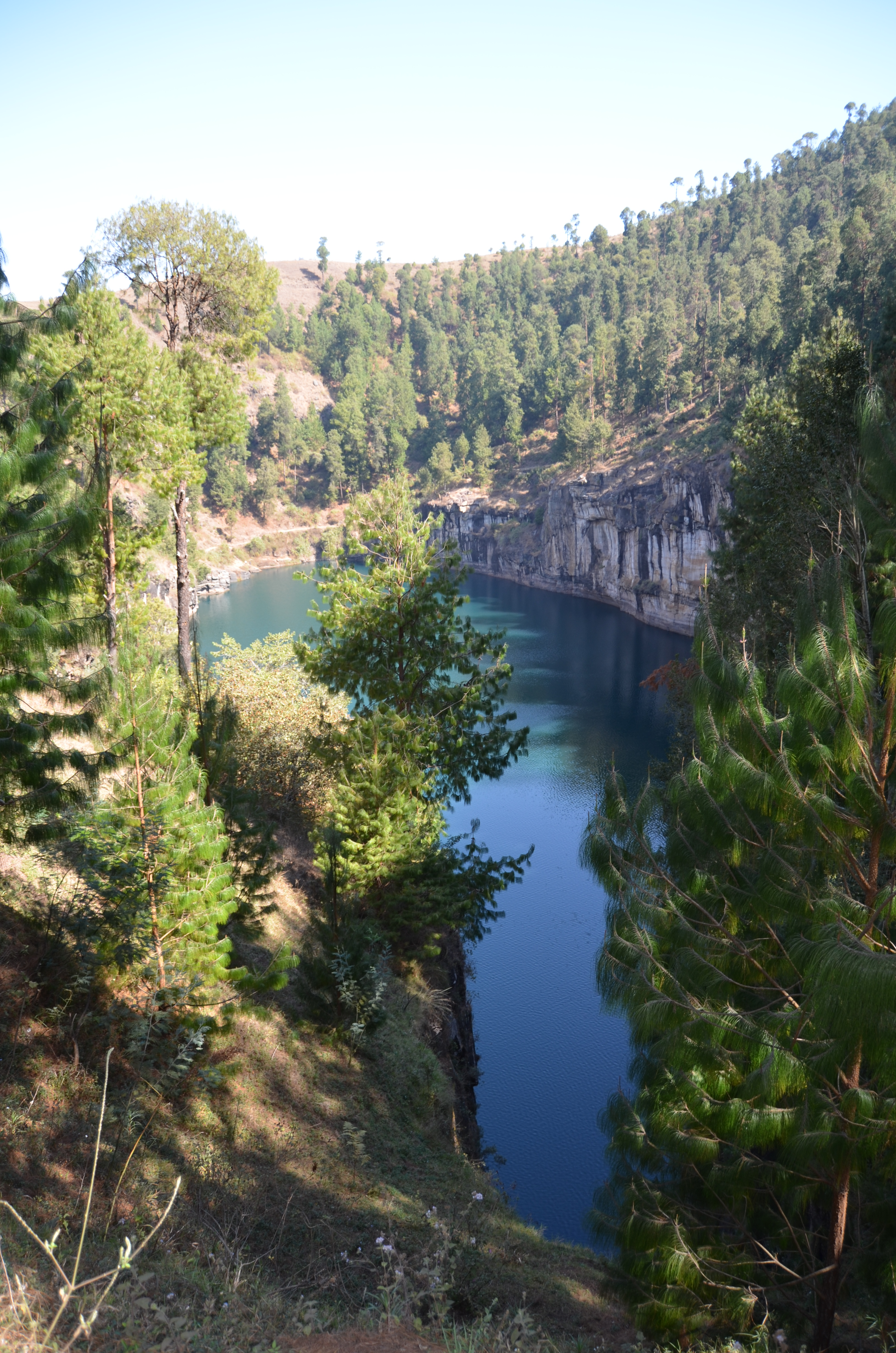

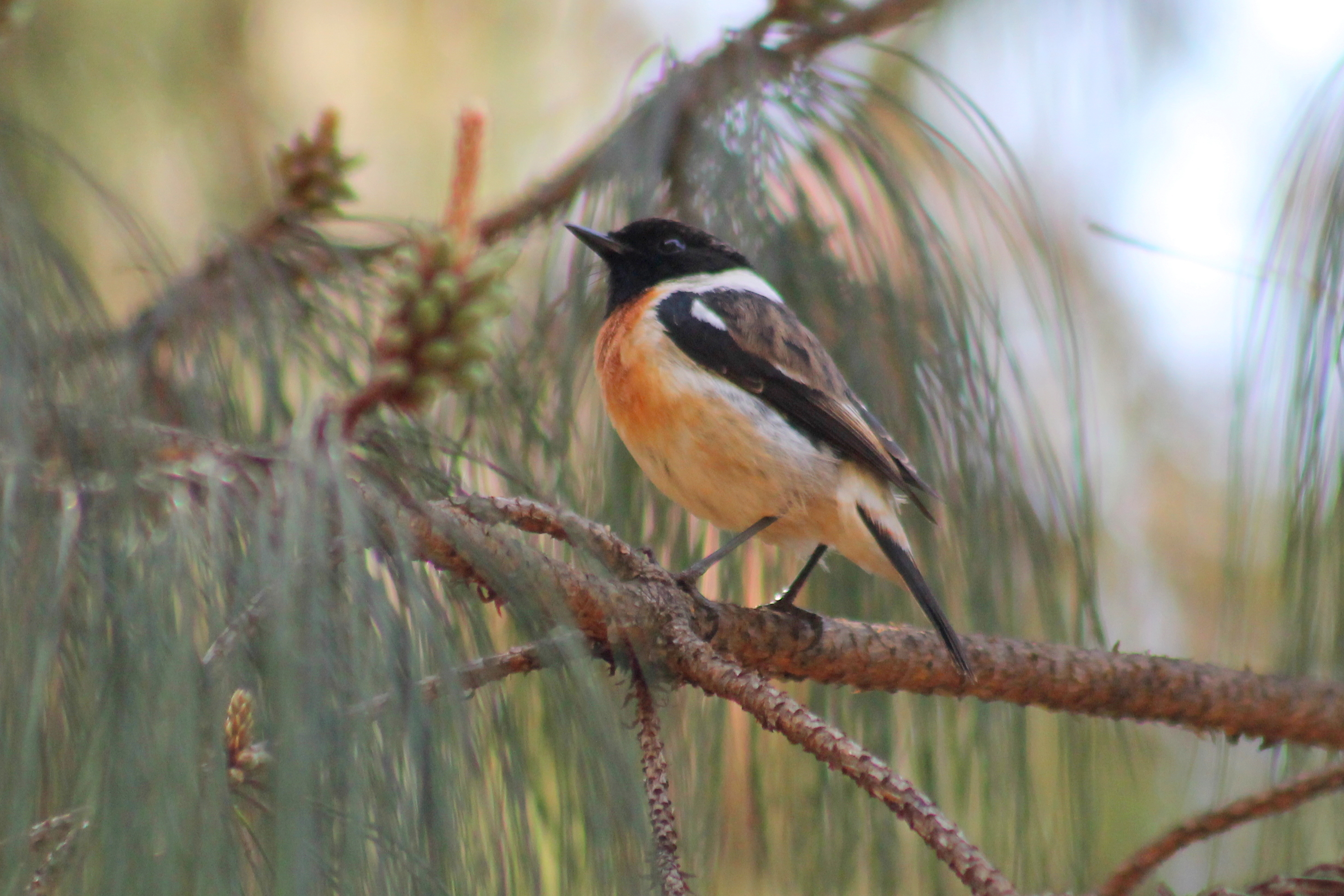
Madagascar stonechat found at Lake Tritriva

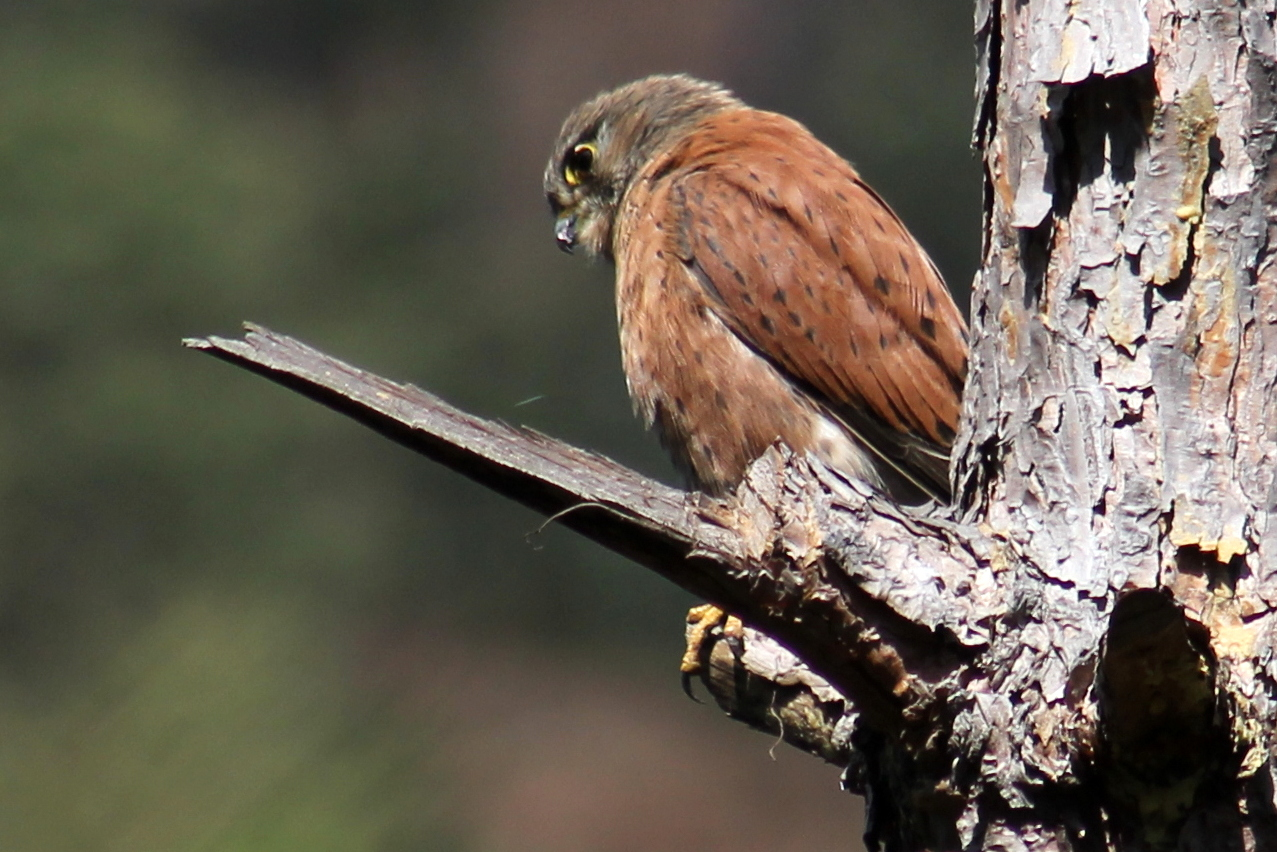
Malagasy kestrel found at Lake Tritriva
