= Vinaninkarena =

- Location in Madagascar
- Coordinates: 19°57′S 47°3′E
- Country: Madagascar
- Region: Vakinankaratra
- District: Antsirabe II
- Elevation: 1,439 m (4,721 ft)

Population (2001)
  - Total: 11,000
  - Ethnicities: Merina
- Time zone: UTC3 (EAT)

Vinaninkarena is a town and commune in Madagascar. It belongs to the district of Antsirabe II, which is a part of Vakinankaratra Region. The population of the commune was estimated to be approximately 11,000 in 2001 commune census.

Primary and junior level secondary education are available in town. The majority 90% of the population of the commune are farmers, while an additional 10% receives their livelihood from raising livestock. The most important crops are rice and wheat, while other important agricultural products are vegetables, cassava, barley and potatoes.
