= FC Vakinankaratra =

Malagasy football club

Vakinankaratra
- Full name: Vakinankaratra FC
- Ground: Antsirabe
- League: THB Champions League

Vakinankaratra FC is a Malagasy football club based in Antsirabe, Vakinankaratra in central Madagascar.

The team plays in the THB Champions League the top division of Malagasy football. In 2017 the team won the regional championship.
