= FC Jirama Antsirabe =

Malagasy football club

FC Jirama
- Full name: FC Jirama Antsirabe
- Ground: Antsirabe Stadium; Antananarivo, Madagascar
- League: Malagasy Second Division

FC Jirama Antsirabe is a Malagasy football club based in Antananarivo, Madagascar. The team currently plays in the Malagasy Second Division.

== Stadium ==
Currently the team plays at the Antsirabe Stadium.

== Performance in CAF competitions ==
- CAF Cup: 1 appearance

2001 CAF Cup - first round
