= Vakinankaratra =

Coordinates: 19.868°S 47.034°E

Vakinankaratra Region
- Region
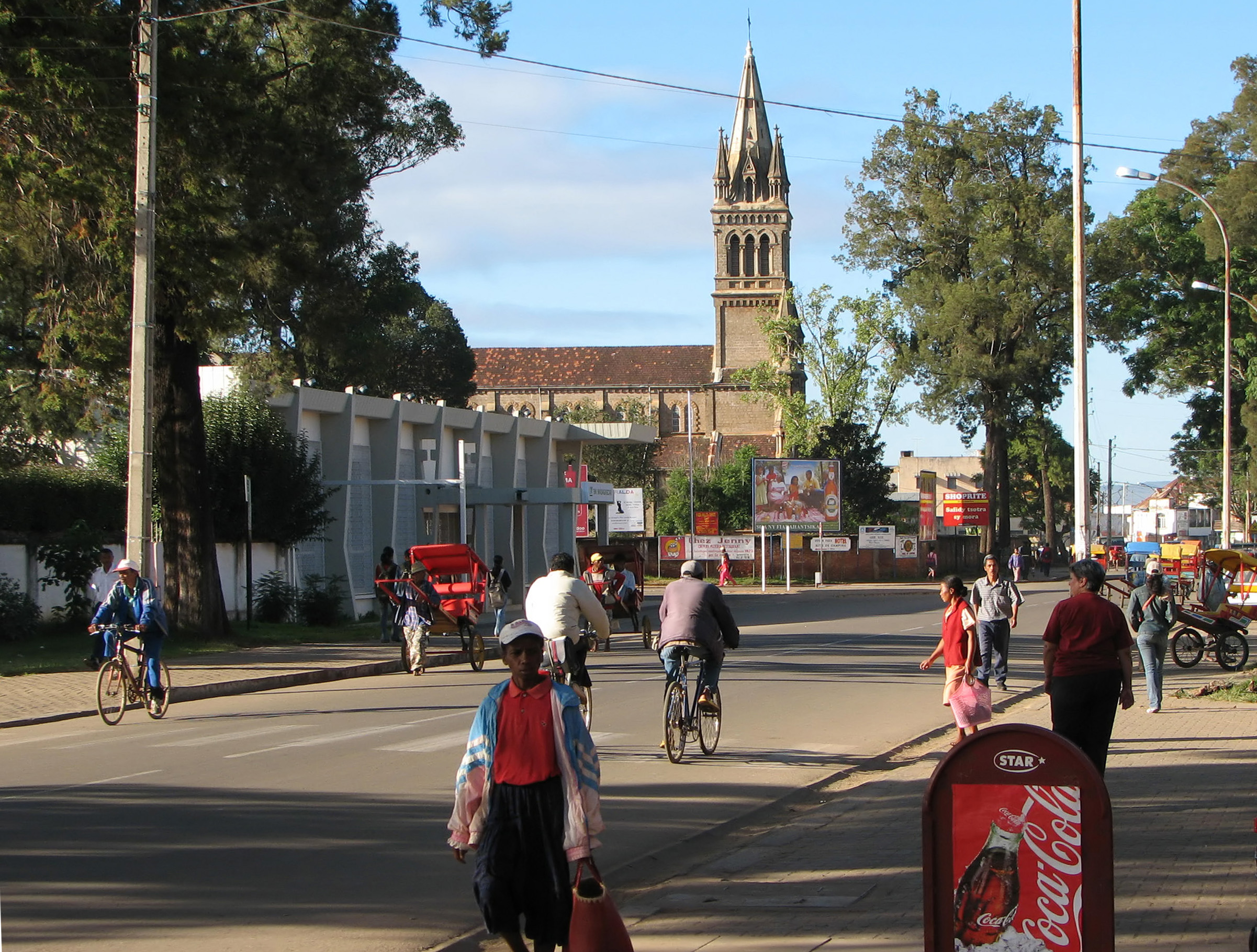
- Antsirabe

- Location in Madagascar
- Country: Madagascar
- Capital: Antsirabe

Government
  - Governor: Vy Vato Rakotovao

Area
  - Total: 16,599 km^{2} (6,409 sq mi)

Population (2018)
  - Total: 2,074,358
  - Density: 124.97/km^{2} (323.67/sq mi)
  - Ethnicities: Vakinankaratra
- Time zone: UTC3 (EAT)
- HDI (2018): 0.531 low · 8th of 22

Vakinankaratra is a region in central Madagascar. The capital of the region is Antsirabe. It's one of the four regions of the Antananarivo Province. Vakinankaratra covers an area of 16,599 kilometres (10,314 miles), and had a population of 2,074,358 in 2018.

== History ==
The kingdom of Vakinankaratra, known as the kingdom of the river Andrantsay, was founded at the beginning of the 17th century by Andrianony, a prince originally from Alasora, south of Antananarivo. The capital of the kingdom used to be Fivavahana in today's Betafo District.

The last ruler of the Kingdom of Andrantsay was Andriamanalinarivo who was on the throne when Imerina king Andrianampoinimerina conquered the area with the help of the young prince Radama at the beginning of the 19th century. The territory was integrated into the Merina Kingdom under the new name Vakinankaratra.

During the colonial period the centre of the region shifted to Antsirabe.

== Population ==
Vakinankaratra is the second most populous region of Madagascar and it has the second highest population density, only beaten by Analamanga, where the national capital and biggest city, Antananarivo, is located. In 2018, Vakinankaratra had a population of 2,074,358 and an average density of 117.0 people per km². The vast majority of the population belongs to the Merina ethnic group.

== Economy ==
Vakinankaratra generates 10% of the GDP of Madagascar. There is an important textile industry and it is the principal bassin of legume production of the island. It also supplies 65% of the milk produced in Madagascar.

== Geography ==
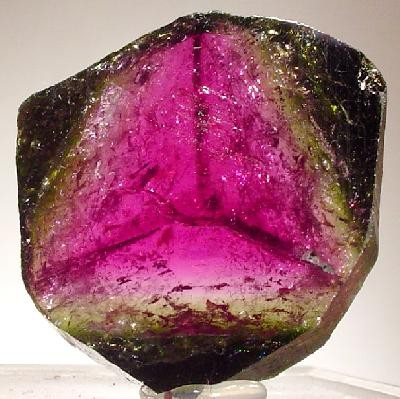
A polished slice of liddicoatite from Betafo

Vakinankaratra is situated in the central highlands of Madagascar. The region covers an area of 16,599 km^{2} (6,409 sq mi), making it the third least extensive region in Madagascar. It borders the region of Bongolava in the northwest, Itasy in the north, Analamanga in the northeast, Alaotra Mangoro and Atsinanana in the east, Amoron'i Mania in the south, and Menabe to the west.

A number of precious minerals are found in Vakinankaratra, including Ferrocolumbite, Liddicoatite, and Londonite.

== Bodies of Water ==
- Lake Tritriva (15 km from Antsirabe)
- Lake Andraikiba (7 km from Antsirabe)
- Tatamarina Lake (at Betafo)
- The Mania River flows south of Antsirabe.
- The Onive River at Tsinjoarivo, Antanifotsy and Ambatolampy.
- The Andromba River at Behenjy.
- The Sahasarotra river

== Protected Area ==
- Manjakatompo Ankaratra New Protected Area
- Faratsiho Natural Park

== Administrative divisions ==
Vakinankaratra Region is divided into seven districts, which are sub-divided into 89 communes.

- Ambatolampy District - 19 communes
- Antanifotsy District - 13 communes
- Antsirabe I District - 1 commune
- Antsirabe II District - 20 communes
- Betafo District - 18 communes
- Faratsiho District - 9 communes
- Mandoto District - 9 communes

== Transport ==
=== Airport ===
- Antsirabe Airport

=== Roads ===
- National road 7 - mayor axe North - South.
- National road 43 - (Analavory - Ambohibary)
- National road 34 (Antsirabe - Malaimbandy (Menabe))
- Provincial road 73 (Tsiafajavona Ankaratra to Ambatolampy).
- Provincial road 111 (Antanifotsy - Tsarahonenana Sahanivotry)
- Provincial road 122 (Antsirabe - Soanindrariny)
- Provincial road 123 (Tsarahonenana Sahanivotry - Antanambao, Antsirabe II)

=== Railways ===
- Madarail - Antananarivo-Antsirabe (159 km) - presently closed due to collapse of the bridge of the river Sasaony, at 19 km from Antananarivo.

== Sports ==
Football:

- FC Vakinankaratra (several times champions of Madagascar)
- FC Jirama Antsirabe

Basketball:

- GNBC

== Gallery ==
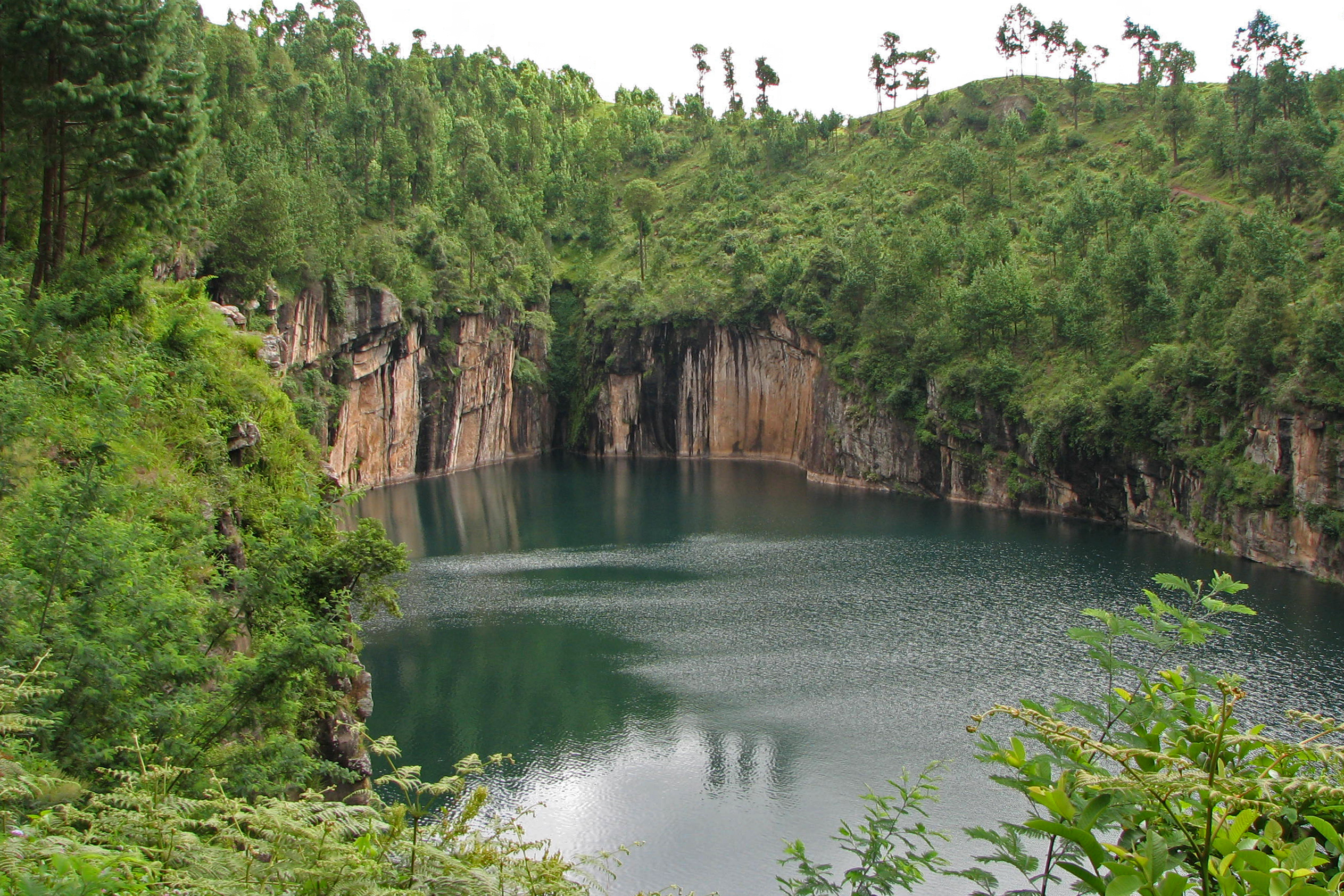
Lake Tritriva

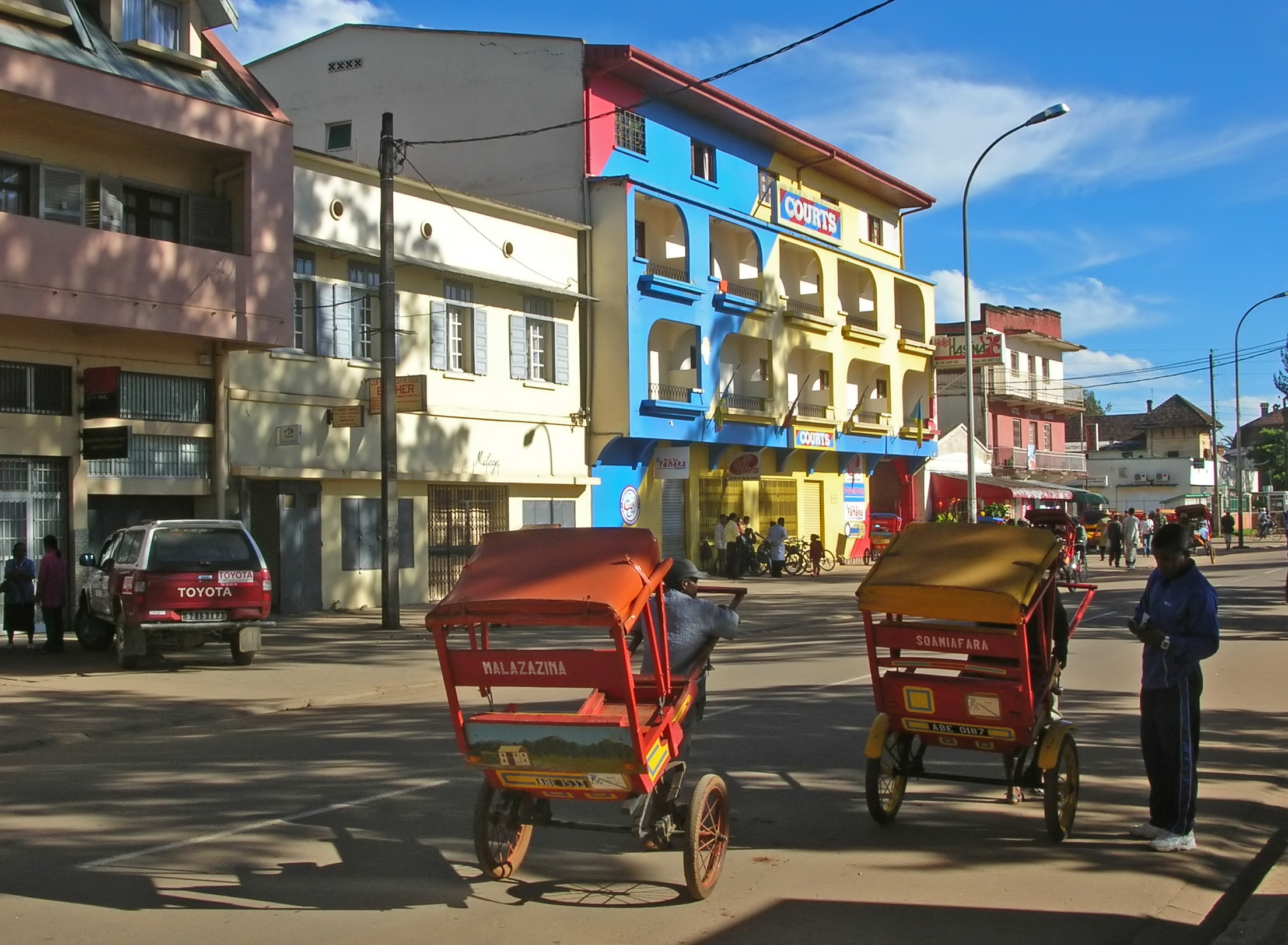
Antsirabe

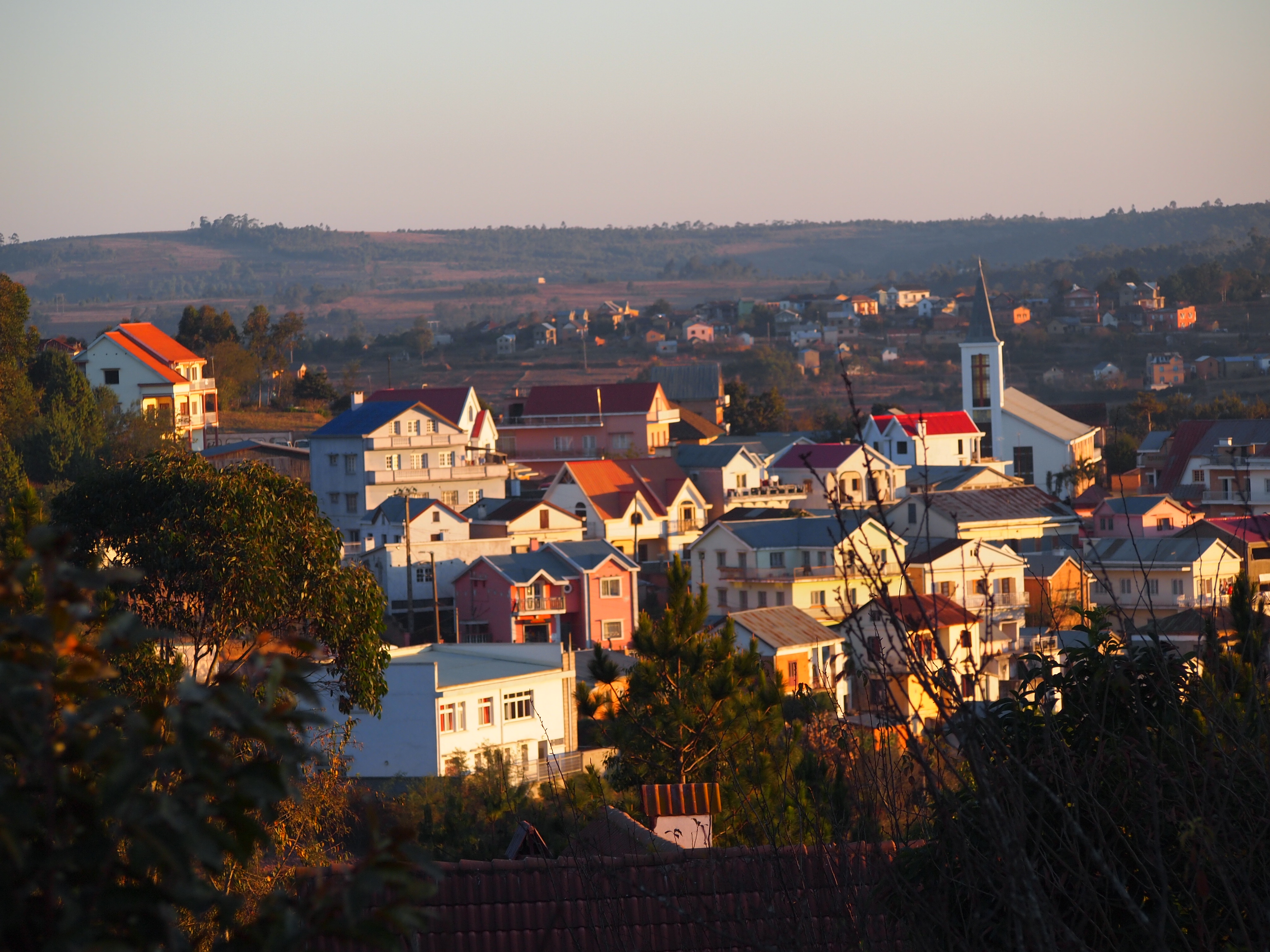
Ambatolampy

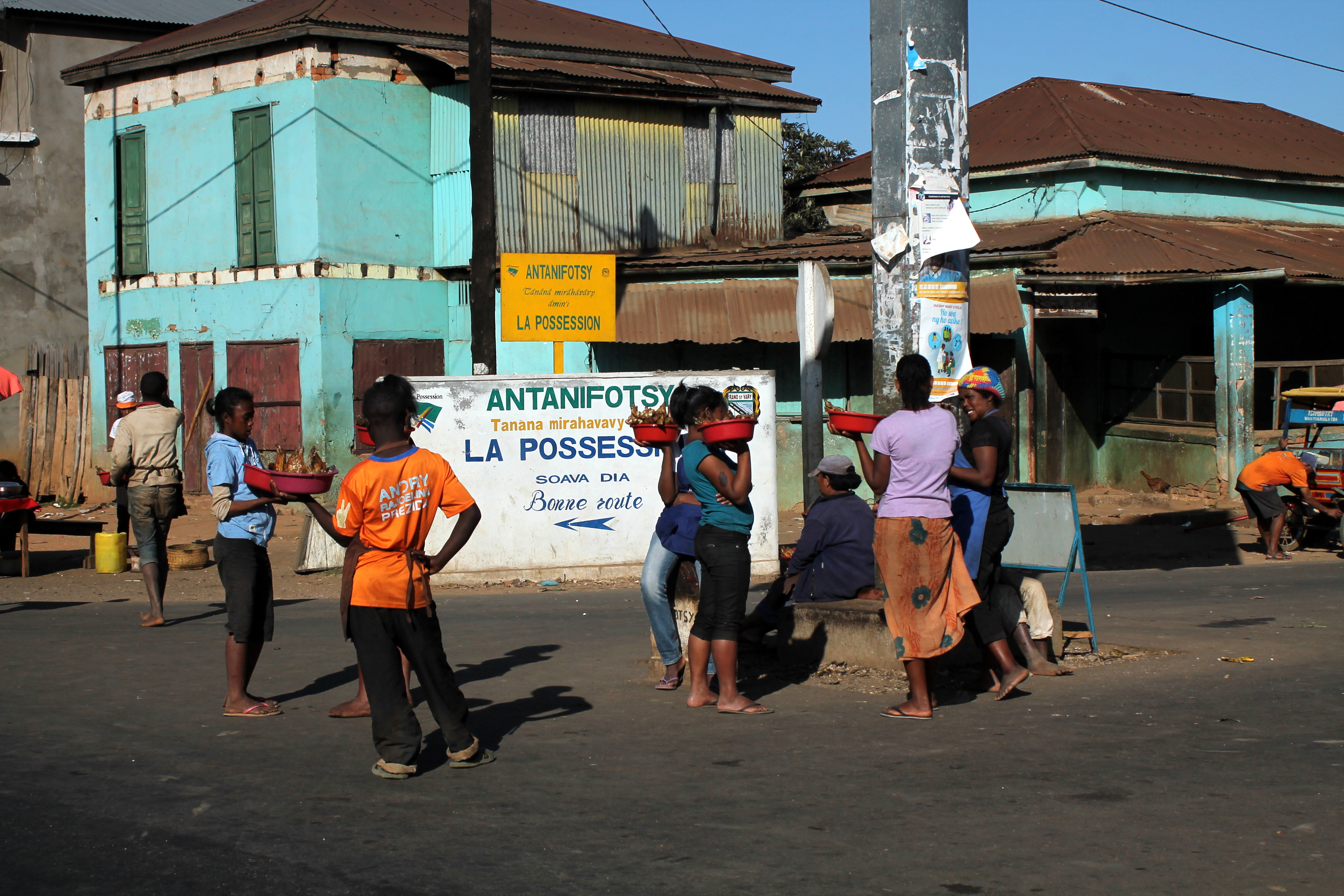
Antanifotsy

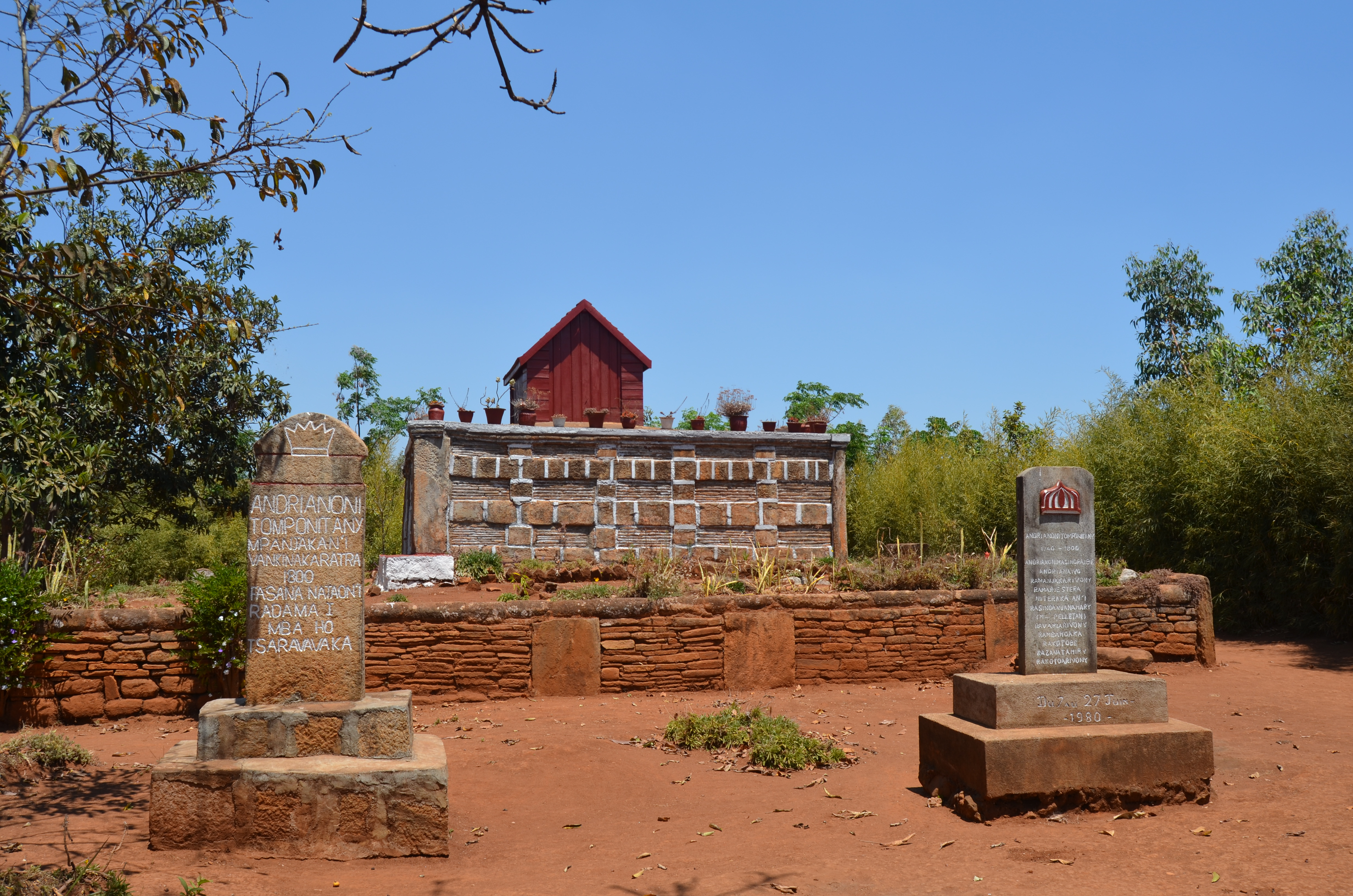
Royal tombs in Betafo

== See also ==
- Antananarivo Province
