= Mananasy =

- Location in Madagascar
- Coordinates: 19°9′S 46°39′E
- Country: Madagascar
- Region: Itasy
- District: Soavinandriana

Government
  - Mayor: Germain Razafindrabe

Area
  - Land: 167 km^{2} (64 sq mi)
- Elevation: 1,191 m (3,907 ft)

Population (2016)
  - Total: 29,763
  - Ethnicities: Merina
- Time zone: UTC3 (EAT)
- Postal code: 118

Mananasy is a rural municipality in Madagascar. It belongs to the district of Soavinandriana, which is a part of Itasy Region. The population of the commune was estimated 29,763 in 2016.

Primary and junior level secondary education are available in town. The majority 90% of the population of the commune are farmers, while an additional 5% receives their livelihood from raising livestock. The most important crop is rice, while other important products are beans and maize. Services provide employment for 5% of the population.

== Geography ==
This municipality borders to the municipality of Ankaranana in its North, in the East by Soavinandriana and Ampary, in the South by Amberomanga and it the West by Mahavelona.

== Fokontany (villages) ==
This municipality also covers the villages of Tsitakondaza, Andranomafana, Miarinkifeno, Belavenona, Ambohimitrena, Manjakasoa, Andrakimasina, Anteza Firaisana, Antanimenakely, Soanierana Ambohimanga and Amtsapanimahazo.

== Roads ==
Mananasy is linked to the National road 43 by a Provincial road (RIP 103) from Soavinandriana (13km) in a very bad state of conservation. Only motorcycles and tractors are able to pass. Though this road is being renovated in 2022.

== Lakes ==
The Andranomavo Lake, a volcanic crater lake.
