= Ambohidanerana =

- Location in Madagascar
- Coordinates: 19°11′S 46°46′E
- Country: Madagascar
- Region: Itasy
- District: Soavinandriana
- Established: 2015
- Elevation: 1,417 m (4,649 ft)

Population (2018)
  - Total: 10,786
  - Ethnicities: Merina
- Time zone: UTC3 (EAT)
- Postal code: 118

Ambohidanerana is a rural commune in Madagascar. It belongs to the district of Soavinandriana, which is a part of Itasy Region. The population of the commune was 10,786 in 2018.

The commune is situated at 8 km from Soavinandriana on the National road 43.
