= Morafeno, Arivonimamo =

Morafeno
- Location in Madagascar
- Coordinates: 19°5′S 47°6′E
- Country: Madagascar
- Region: Itasy
- District: Arivonimamo
- Elevation: 1,536 m (5,039 ft)

Population (2001)
  - Total: 11,000
  - Ethnicities: Merina
- Time zone: UTC3 (EAT)
- Postal code: 112

Morafeno is a rural municipality in Madagascar. It belongs to the district of Arivonimamo, which is a part of Itasy Region. The population of the commune was estimated to be approximately 11,000 in 2001 commune census.

Only primary schooling is available. The majority 96% of the population of the commune are farmers, while an additional 2% receives their livelihood from raising livestock. The most important crop is rice, while other important products are cassava and potatoes. Services provide employment for 2% of the population.

== Geography ==
Morafeno is linked to Arivonimamo by a Provincial road of 20 km that had to be renovated by its citizens to be practicable.
