= Alkamisikely =

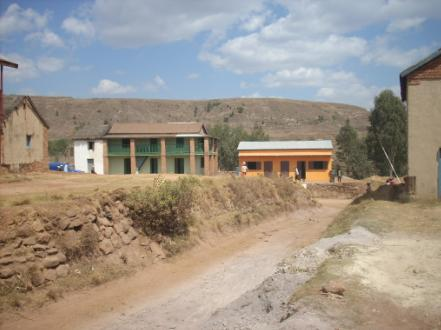
- Alakamisikely

- Location in Madagascar
- Coordinates: 19°13′S 47°11′E
- Country: Madagascar
- Region: Itasy
- District: Arivonimamo
- Elevation: 1,774 m (5,820 ft)

Population (2019)Census
  - Total: 3,957
  - Ethnicities: Merina
- Time zone: UTC3 (EAT)
- Postal code: 112

Alkamisikely is a town and commune in Madagascar. It belongs to the district of Arivonimamo District which is a part of Itasy Region. The population of the commune was 3,957 in 2019.

It is situated on the Route d'Interet Provincial 84 at 25 km from Arivonimamo.

Only primary schooling is available. The majority 96% of the population of the commune are farmers, while an additional 3% receives their livelihood from raising livestock. The most important crops are rice and potatoes; also beans is an important agricultural product. Services provide employment for 1% of the population.

Following villages belong to the commune of Alkamisikely:

N°	Village name (Fokontany)	Distance in km from the capital of the commune
1	Ampahimanga	0
2	Imerinatsimo	14
3	Ankamory	13
4	Ambohitringahimainty	13
5	Nangaka	10
6	Ankazotokana	10
7	Ambohibary	9
8	Manjakatompo	8
9	Antanimasaka	7
10	Antanetilava	7
11	Alakamisy Antsampanimahazo	6,5
12	Amboanjobe	6
13	Fisoronana Efadreny	5,5
14	Ambanifahitra	5
