= Dondona =

- Location within Madagascar
- Coordinates: 19°10′S 46°51′E
- Country: Madagascar
- Region: Itasy
- District: Soavinandriana
- Elevation: 1,298 m (4,259 ft)

Population (2018)
  - Total: 8,788
  - Ethnicities: Merina
- Time zone: UTC3 (EAT)

Dondona is a town and commune in Madagascar. It is located in the district of Soavinandriana, which is a part of Itasy Region. The population of the commune was estimated to be approximately 8,788 in 2018.

It is situated at a distance of 75 km West from the capital Antananarivo and 10km from Soavinandriana.

Only primary schooling is available. The majority 99% of the population of the commune are farmers. The most important crop is rice, while other important products are maize, cassava and tobacco. Services provide employment for 1% of the population.

Tobacco is an important factor of the local community. Dondona produces mainly Paraky gasy, a kind of chewing tobacco.
