= Ambatoasana Centre =

- Location in Madagascar
- Coordinates: 19°3′S 46°44′E
- Country: Madagascar
- Region: Itasy
- District: Soavinandriana
- Elevation: 1,288 m (4,226 ft)

Population (2001)
  - Total: 9,000
  - Ethnicities: Merina
- Time zone: UTC3 (EAT)
- Postal code: 118

Ambatoasana Centre or Ambatoasana Afovoany is a town and commune in Madagascar. It belongs to the district of Soavinandriana, which is a part of Itasy Region. The population of the commune was estimated to be approximately 9,000 in 2001 commune census.

Only primary schooling is available. The majority 99.5% of the population of the commune are farmers. The most important crops are rice and peanuts, while other important agricultural products are beans and maize. Services provide employment for 0.5% of the population.

== Roads ==
Ambatoasana Centre is situated in a remote area of Itasy. It is linked with Soavinandriana by the unpaved Route d'Interet provincial 103 (RIP 103 (Madagascar), that was refurbished only up to Mananasy. The remainder of this road is only practicable by motorbike or tractor.
