= Manalalondo =

- Location in Madagascar
- Coordinates: 19°15′S 47°7′E
- Country: Madagascar
- Region: Itasy
- District: Arivonimamo
- Elevation: 1,661 m (5,449 ft)

Population (2019)Census
  - Total: 12,995
  - Ethnicities: Merina
- Time zone: UTC3 (EAT)
- Postal code: 112

Manalalondo is a rural municipality in Madagascar. It belongs to the district of Arivonimamo, which is a part of Itasy Region. The population of the municipality is 12,995 in 2019.

It is situated on the Route d'Interet Provincial 84 at 38 km from Arivonimamo.

Primary and junior level secondary education are available in town. The majority 97% of the population of the commune are farmers, while an additional 2% receives their livelihood from raising livestock. The most important crop is rice, while other important products are cassava and potatoes. Services provide employment for 1% of the population.
