= Ambohipandrano =

- Location in Madagascar
- Coordinates: 19°9′S 47°22′E
- Country: Madagascar
- Region: Itasy
- District: Arivonimamo
- Elevation: 1,349 m (4,426 ft)

Population (2001)
  - Total: 21,000
  - Ethnicities: Merina
- Time zone: UTC3 (EAT)
- Postal code: 112

Ambohipandrano is a rural municipality in Madagascar. It belongs to the district of Arivonimamo, which is a part of Itasy Region. The population of the municipality was estimated to be approximately 21,000 in 2001 commune census.

Only primary schooling is available. The majority 97% of the population of the commune are farmers. The most important crops are rice and peanuts, while other important agricultural products are beans and potatoes. Services provide employment for 3% of the population.

== Roads ==
The provincial road 71 links Ambohipandrano to Imerintsiatosika and the National road 1 to Antananarivo, or to Behenjy and the National road 7.
