= Vinaninony-Atsimo =

Vinaninony - Atsimo
- Location in Madagascar
- Coordinates: 19°32′S 46°57′E
- Country: Madagascar
- Region: Vakinankaratra
- District: Faratsiho

Area
  - Total: 390 km^{2} (150 sq mi)
- Elevation: 1,901 m (6,237 ft)

Population (2018)Census
  - Total: 41,798
  - Ethnicities: Merina
- Time zone: UTC3 (EAT)
- Postal code: 114

Vinaninony - Atsimo (Vinaninoy Sud) is a town and commune in Madagascar. It belongs to the district of Faratsiho, which is a part of Vakinankaratra Region. The population of the municipality was 41,798 inhabitants in 2018.

Primary and junior level secondary education are available in town. The majority 89% of the population of the commune are farmers, while an additional 10% receives their livelihood from raising livestock. The most important crop is rice, while other important products are wheat and potatoes. Services provide employment for 1% of the population.

== Geography ==
Vinaninoy Sud is situated at 45km north of Antsirabe and 18km south of Faratsiho on the National road 43. .This municipality is crossed by the Sahasarotra river.
