= Mahavelona, Soavinandriana =

Mahavelona
- Location in Madagascar
- Coordinates: 19°10′S 46°31′E
- Country: Madagascar
- Region: Itasy
- District: Soavinandriana
- Elevation: 1,006 m (3,301 ft)

Population (2001)
  - Total: 14,000
  - Ethnicities: Merina
- Time zone: UTC3 (EAT)
- Postal code: 118

Mahavelona is a rural municipality in Madagascar. It belongs to the district of Soavinandriana, which is a part of Itasy Region. The population of the commune was estimated to be approximately 14,000 in 2001 commune census.

Primary and junior level secondary education are available in town. The majority 90% of the population of the commune are farmers, while an additional 8% receives their livelihood from raising livestock. The most important crops are rice and maize; also cassava is an important agricultural product. Services provide employment for 2% of the population.

== Roads ==
Mahevalona is linked with Soavinandriana by the unpaved Route d'Interet provincial 103 (RIP 103 (Madagascar), that was refunished only up to Mananasy. The remaining of this road are only practicable by motorbike or tractor.
