= Amboanana =

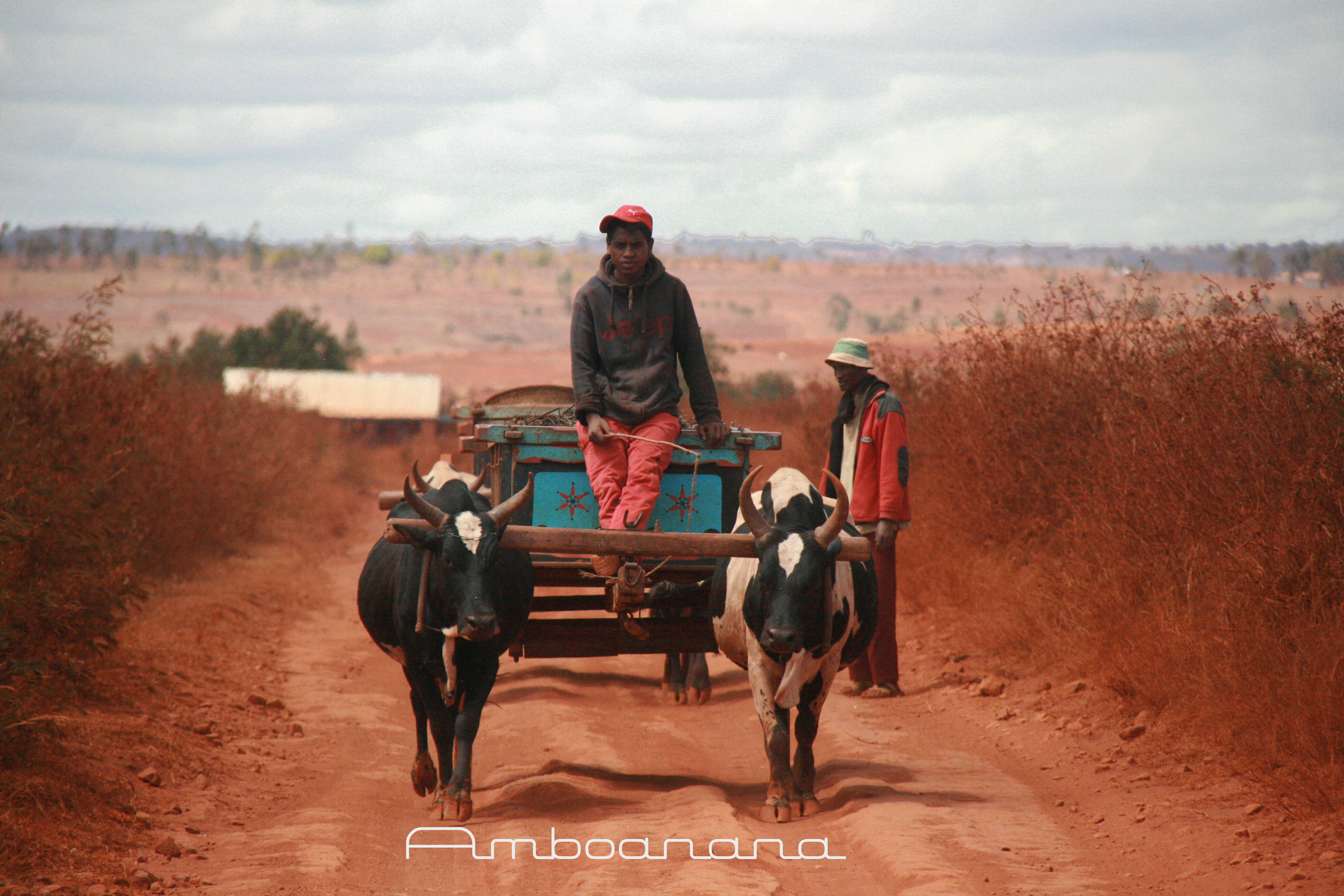
- Amboanana

- Location in Madagascar
- Coordinates: 19°9′S 47°10′E
- Country: Madagascar
- Region: Itasy
- District: Arivonimamo
- Elevation: 1,575 m (5,167 ft)

Population (2019)
  - Total: 19,217
  - Ethnicities: Merina
- Time zone: UTC3 (EAT)
- Postal code: 112

Amboanana is a town and commune in Madagascar. It belongs to the district of Arivonimamo, which is a part of Itasy Region. The population of the commune was estimated 19,217 in 2019.

It is situated on the Route d'Interet Provincial 84 at 16 km from Arivonimamo.

Primary and junior level secondary education are available in town. The majority 99% of the population of the commune are farmers. The most important crop is rice, while other important products are maize and potatoes. Services provide employment for 1% of the population.
