= Betafo, Arivonimamo =

Village and fokontany in Madagascar

- Village (fokontany)
- Location in Madagascar
- Coordinates: 18°59′S 47°06′E
- Country: Madagascar
- Region: Itasy
- District: Arivonimamo
- Municipality: Arivonimamo II
- Elevation: 1,320 m (4,330 ft)

Population
  - Ethnicities: Merina
- Time zone: UTC3 (EAT)
- Postal code: 112

Betafo ("many roofs) is a village and fokontany in the municipality Arivonimamo II, in the district of Arivonimamo, in the region of Itasy, Madagascar.

== Population ==
The village's inhabitants are said to be divided between descendants of nobles (andriana) and descendants of former slaves (olona mainty, literally "black people"). This aspect was the subject of a study by anthropologist David Graeber. His book, Lost People: Magic and the Legacy of Slavery in Madagascar, contains a detailed recounting of the village's oral traditions, full of stories of scandalous murders, magical battles, forbidden romances, and spiteful ancestors sending fires and hailstorms from their tombs.

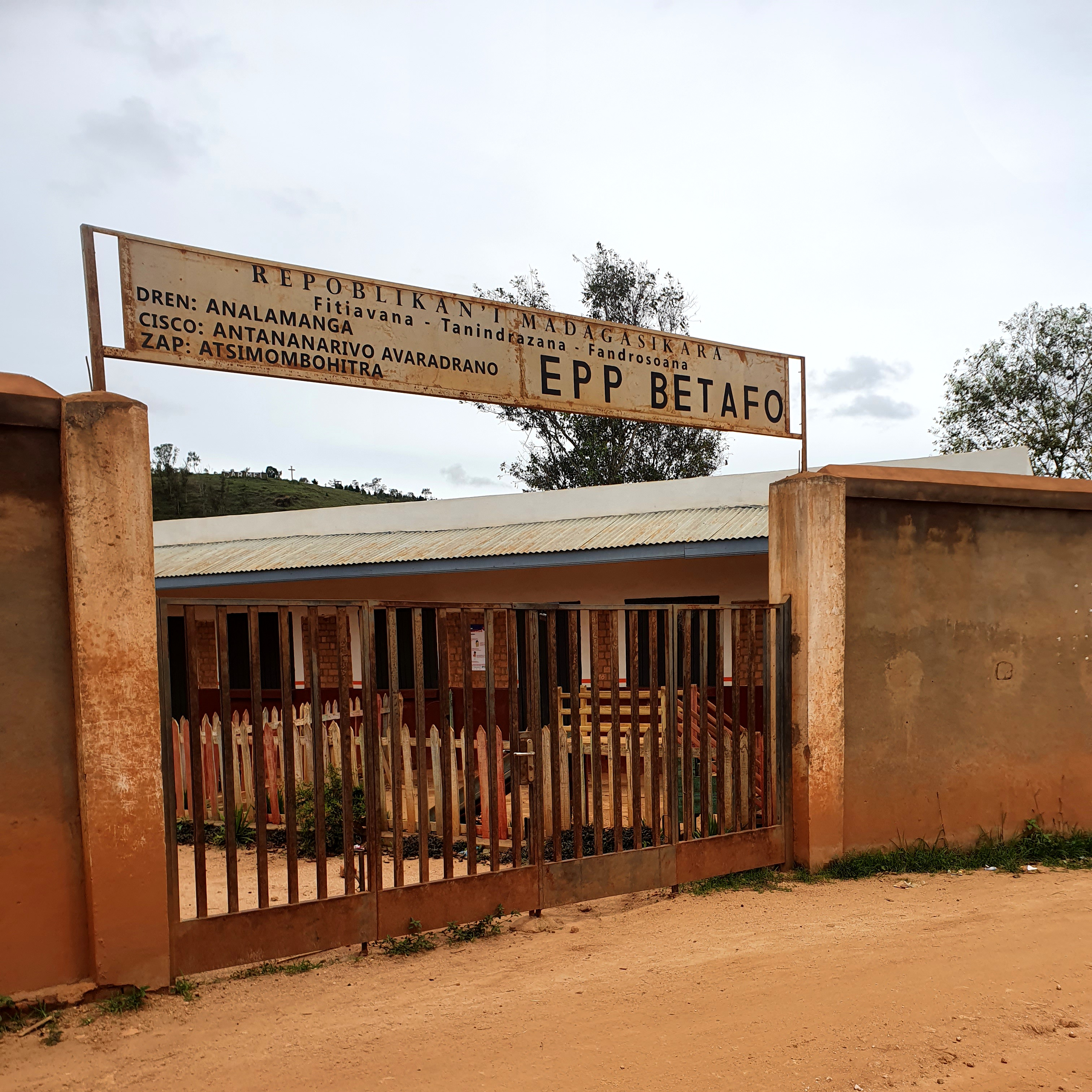
EPP Betafo Ambohimangakely
