= Amparaky =

- Location in Madagascar
- Coordinates: 19°19′S 46°38′E
- Country: Madagascar
- Region: Itasy
- District: Soavinandriana
- Elevation: 1,132 m (3,714 ft)

Population (2001)
  - Total: 6,000
  - Ethnicities: Merina
- Time zone: UTC3 (EAT)

Amparaky is a town and commune in Madagascar. It belongs to the district of Soavinandriana, which is a part of Itasy Region. The population of the commune was estimated to be approximately 6,000 in 2001 commune census.

Primary and junior level secondary education are available in town. The majority 99% of the population of the commune are farmers. The most important crop is rice, while other important products are maize and cassava. Services provide employment for 1% of the population.
