= Antambolo =

- Location in Madagascar
- Coordinates: 18°50′S 47°20′E
- Country: Madagascar
- Region: Itasy
- District: Arivonimamo
- Elevation: 1,261 m (4,137 ft)

Population (2001)
  - Total: 4,000
  - Ethnicities: Merina
- Time zone: UTC3 (EAT)

Antambolo or Amboasary-Antambolo is a town and commune in Madagascar. It belongs to the district of Arivonimamo, which is a part of Itasy Region. The population of the commune was estimated to be approximately 4,000 in 2001 commune census.

Primary and junior level secondary education are available in town. The majority 99.5% of the population of the commune are farmers. The most important crops are rice and tomato, while other important agricultural products are cucumber, beans and cassava. Services provide employment for 0.5% of the population.
