= Andranomiely =

- Location in Madagascar
- Coordinates: 19°20′S 47°12′E
- Country: Madagascar
- Region: Itasy
- District: Arivonimamo
- Elevation: 1,989 m (6,526 ft)

Population (2001)
  - Total: 10,000
  - Ethnicities: Merina
- Time zone: UTC3 (EAT)

Andranomiely is a town and commune in Madagascar. It belongs to the district of Arivonimamo, which is a part of Itasy Region. The population of the commune was estimated to be approximately 10,000 in 2001 commune census.

Only primary schooling is available. The majority 99% of the population of the commune are farmers. The most important crop is rice, while other important products are cassava and potatoes. Services provide employment for 1% of the population.
