= Tamponala =

- Location in Madagascar
- Coordinates: 19°18′S 46°25′E
- Country: Madagascar
- Region: Itasy
- District: Soavinandriana
- Elevation: 898 m (2,946 ft)

Population (2001)
  - Total: 10,000
  - Ethnicities: Merina
- Time zone: UTC3 (EAT)

Tamponala is a town and commune in Madagascar. It belongs to the district of Soavinandriana, which is a part of Itasy Region. The population of the commune was estimated to be approximately 10,000 in the 2001 commune census.

== Education and industry ==
Only primary schooling is available.

The majority (97%) of the population of the commune are farmers, while an additional 2% receive their livelihood from raising livestock. The most important crop is rice, while other important products are peanuts, beans and cassava. Services provide employment for 1% of the population.
