= Mahatsinjo Est =

- Location in Madagascar
- Coordinates: 19°17′S 47°13′E
- Country: Madagascar
- Region: Itasy
- District: Arivonimamo
- Elevation: 2,038 m (6,686 ft)

Population (2001)
  - Total: 3,000
  - Ethnicities: Merina
- Time zone: UTC3 (EAT)

Mahatsinjo Est is a town and commune in Madagascar. It belongs to the district of Arivonimamo, which is a part of Itasy Region. The population of the commune was estimated to be approximately 3,000 in 2001 commune census.

Only primary schooling is available. The most important crop is rice, while other important products are maize, cassava and potatoes.
