= Ambatomanga, Arivonimamo =

Ambatomanga
- Location in Madagascar
- Coordinates: 18°44′S 47°27′E
- Country: Madagascar
- Region: Itasy
- District: Arivonimamo
- Elevation: 1,304 m (4,278 ft)

Population (2001)
  - Total: 11,000
  - Ethnicities: Merina
- Time zone: UTC3 (EAT)

Ambatomanga is a town and commune in Madagascar. It belongs to the district of Arivonimamo, which is a part of Itasy Region. The population of the commune was estimated to be approximately 11,000 in 2001 commune census.

Primary and junior level secondary education are available in town. The majority 99% of the population of the commune are farmers. The most important crops are rice and pineapple; also cassava is an important agricultural product. Services provide employment for 1% of the population.
