= Miantsoarivo =

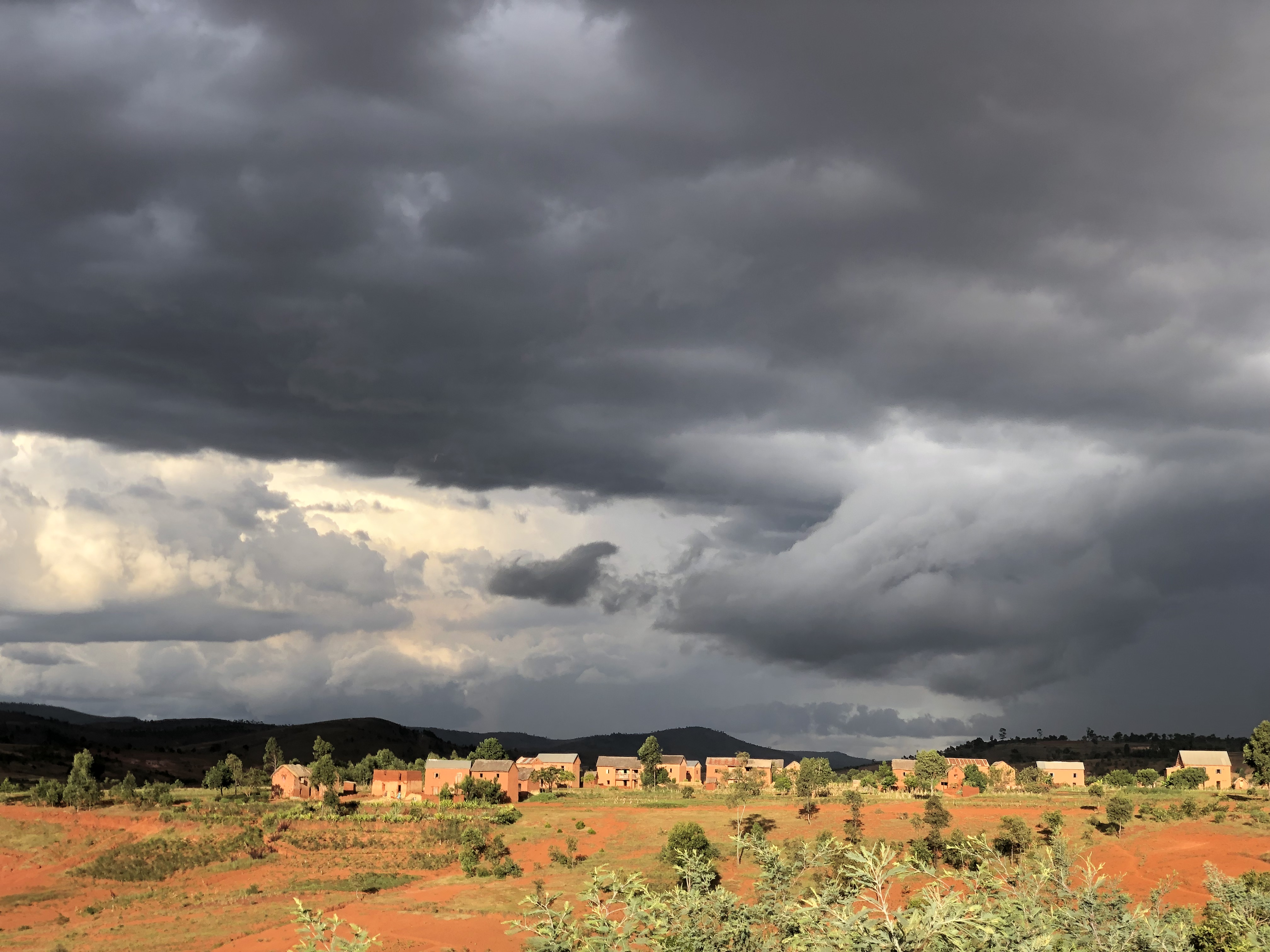
- Miantsoarivo

- Location in Madagascar
- Coordinates: 19°12′S 47°24′E
- Country: Madagascar
- Region: Itasy
- District: Arivonimamo
- Elevation: 1,395 m (4,577 ft)

Population (2001)
  - Total: 23,000
  - Ethnicities: Merina
- Time zone: UTC3 (EAT)
- Postal code: 112

Miantsoarivo is a rural municipality in Madagascar. It belongs to the district of Arivonimamo, which is a part of Itasy Region. The population of the commune was estimated to be approximately 23,000 in 2001 commune census.

Primary and junior level secondary education are available in town. The majority 98% of the population of the commune are farmers, while an additional 1.5% receives their livelihood from raising livestock. The most important crop is rice, while other important products are cassava and taro. Services provide employment for 0.5% of the population.
