= Ambatomirahavavy =

- Location in Madagascar
- Coordinates: 18°56′S 47°23′E
- Country: Madagascar
- Region: Itasy
- District: Arivonimamo

Government
  - Mayor: Jean Berthin Rabefeno
- Elevation: 1,285 m (4,216 ft)

Population (2019)Census
  - Total: 19,163
  - Ethnicities: Merina
- Time zone: UTC3 (EAT)
- Postal code: 112

Ambatomirahavavy is municipality in Madagascar, 21 km west of the capital Antananrivo, on the National road No.1. It belongs to the district of Arivonimamo, which is a part of Itasy Region. The population of the commune was 19,163 in 2019.

Primary and junior level secondary education are available in town. The majority 97% of the population of the commune are farmers, while an additional 2% receives their livelihood from raising livestock. The most important crop is rice, while other important products are beans and cassava. Services provide employment for 1% of the population.

== Rivers ==
The municipality is crossed by two rivers: the Katsaoka (9 km) and the Andromba River (11 km), an affluent of the Ikopa River.
