= Antenimbe =

- Location in Madagascar
- Coordinates: 19°12′S 47°6′E
- Country: Madagascar
- Region: Itasy
- District: Arivonimamo
- Established: 1995
- Elevation: 1,668 m (5,472 ft)

Population (2001)
  - Total: 6,000
  - Ethnicities: Merina
- Time zone: UTC3 (EAT)
- Postal code: 112

Antenimbe is a rural municipality in Madagascar. It belongs to the district of Arivonimamo, which is a part of Itasy Region. The population of the commune was estimated to be approximately 6,000 in 2001 commune census.

Only primary schooling is available. The majority 99% of the population of the commune are farmers, while an additional 1% receives their livelihood from raising livestock. The most important crop is rice, while other important products are beans, cassava and potatoes.
