= Ampahimanga =

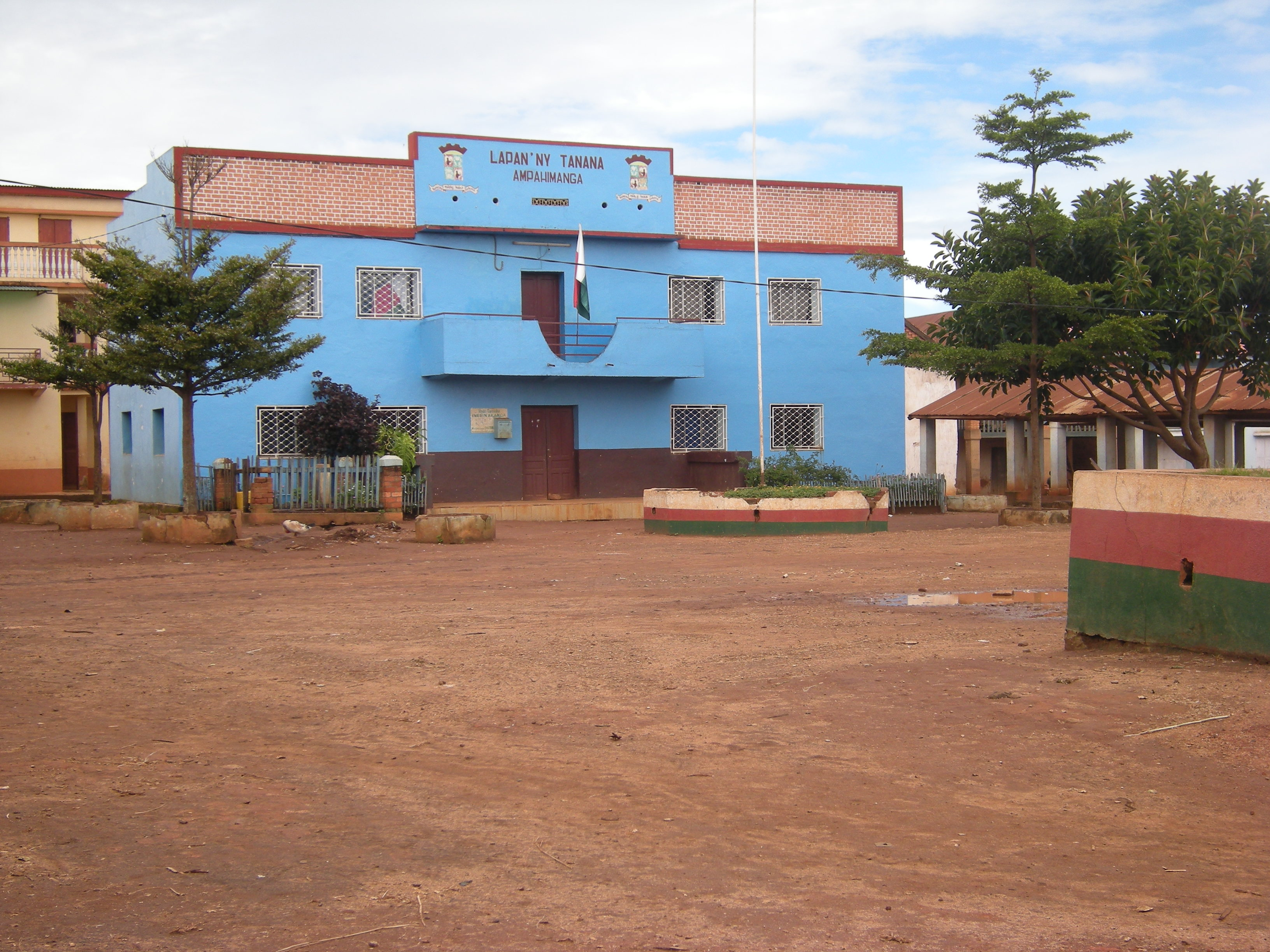
- Town Hall Ampahimanga

- Location in Madagascar
- Coordinates: 19°05′S 47°12′E
- Country: Madagascar
- Region: Itasy
- District: Arivonimamo
- Elevation: 1,258 m (4,127 ft)

Population (2018)
  - Total: 16,184
  - Ethnicities: Merina
- Time zone: UTC3 (EAT)
- Postal code: 112

Ampahimanga is a rural commune in Madagascar. It belongs to the district of Arivonimamo, which is a part of Itasy. The population of the commune was 16,184 in 2018.
