= Ambohitrambo =

- Location in Madagascar
- Coordinates: 18°55′S 47°11′E
- Country: Madagascar
- Region: Itasy
- District: Arivonimamo
- Elevation: 1,311 m (4,301 ft)

Population (2001)
  - Total: 10,000
  - Ethnicities: Merina
- Time zone: UTC3 (EAT)

Ambohitrambo is a town and commune in Madagascar. It belongs to the district of Arivonimamo, which is a part of Itasy Region. The population of the commune was estimated to be approximately 10,000 in 2001 commune census.

Primary and junior level secondary education are available in town. The majority 99% of the population of the commune are farmers. The most important crops are rice and pineapple, while other important agricultural products are sugarcane and tomato. Services provide employment for 1% of the population.
