= Antanetibe, Soavinandriana =

Antanetibe
- Location in Madagascar
- Coordinates: 19°7′S 46°50′E
- Country: Madagascar
- Region: Itasy
- District: Soavinandriana
- Elevation: 1,248 m (4,094 ft)

Population (2001)
  - Total: 8,000
  - Ethnicities: Merina
- Time zone: UTC3 (EAT)

Antanetibe is a town and commune in Madagascar. It belongs to the district of Soavinandriana, which is a part of Itasy Region. The population of the commune was estimated to be approximately 8,000 in 2001 commune census.

Only primary schooling is available. The majority 98% of the population of the commune are farmers. The most important crop is rice, while other important products are beans, maize and cassava. Services provide employment for 2% of the population.
