= Talata Tsimadilo =

- Location in Madagascar
- Coordinates: 18°46′S 47°08′E
- Country: Madagascar
- Region: Itasy
- District: Arivonimamo
- Established: 2015
- Elevation: 1,152 m (3,780 ft)

Population (2018)
  - Total: 7,438
  - Ethnicities: Merina
- Time zone: UTC3 (EAT)
- Postal code: 112

Talata Tsimadilo is a rural commune in Madagascar. It belongs to the district of Arivonimamo, which is a part of Itasy Region. The population of the commune was 7,438 in 2018.
