= Masindray, Soavinandriana =

Masindray
- Location in Madagascar
- Coordinates: 19°16′S 46°44′E
- Country: Madagascar
- Region: Itasy
- District: Soavinandriana
- Elevation: 1,355 m (4,446 ft)

Population (2001)
  - Total: 6,000
  - Ethnicities: Merina
- Time zone: UTC3 (EAT)

Masindray is a town and commune in Madagascar. It belongs to the district of Soavinandriana, which is a part of Itasy Region. The population of the commune was estimated to be approximately 6,000 in 2001 commune census.

Primary and junior level secondary education are available in town. The majority 99% of the population of the commune are farmers. The most important crop is rice, while other important products are peanuts and bambara groundnut. Services provide employment for 1% of the population.
