= Marofangady =

- Location in Madagascar
- Coordinates: 19°19′S 47°5′E
- Country: Madagascar
- Region: Itasy
- District: Arivonimamo
- Elevation: 1,673 m (5,489 ft)

Population (2001)
  - Total: 3,000
  - Ethnicities: Merina
- Time zone: UTC3 (EAT)

Marofangady is a town and commune in Madagascar. It belongs to the district of Arivonimamo, which is a part of Itasy Region.

== Demographics ==
=== 2001 Census ===
The population of the commune was estimated to be approximately 3,000 in 2001 commune census.

=== Education ===
Only primary schooling is available.

=== Employment ===
The majority 98% of the population of the commune are farmers, while an additional 1% receives their livelihood from raising livestock. Services provide employment for 1% of the population.

== Agriculture ==
The most important crop is rice, while other important products are cassava and potatoes.
