= Soavinandriana District =

Soavinandriana district
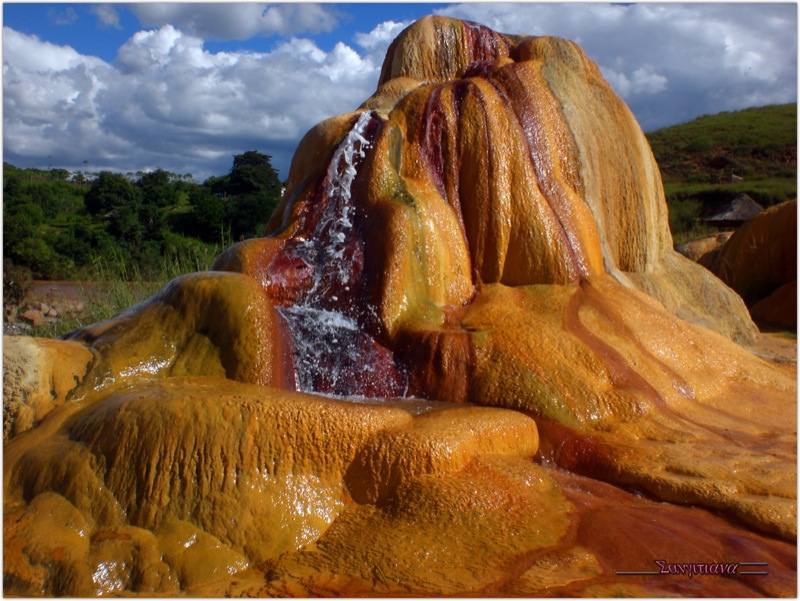
- The Analavory geyser

- Location within Madagascar
- Coordinates: 19°10′S 46°44′E
- Country: Madagascar
- Region: Itasy
- District: Soavinandriana

Area
  - Land: 1,970 km^{2} (760 sq mi)
- Elevation: 1,298 m (4,259 ft)

Population
  - Ethnicities: Merina
- Time zone: UTC3 (EAT)
- Postal code: 118

Soavinandriana district is a district of Itasy in Madagascar.

== Economy ==
Tobacco is an important factor of the local economy.

== Roads ==
It is localized on the National Road 43, about 40 km from Analavory and 140 km from the capital Antananarivo.

== Nature ==
The Ramanavy forest (Forêt de Ramanavy, or translated: Bats Forest) at 10 km from Soavinandriana, that hosts some 20 endemic species of plants.

== Rivers ==
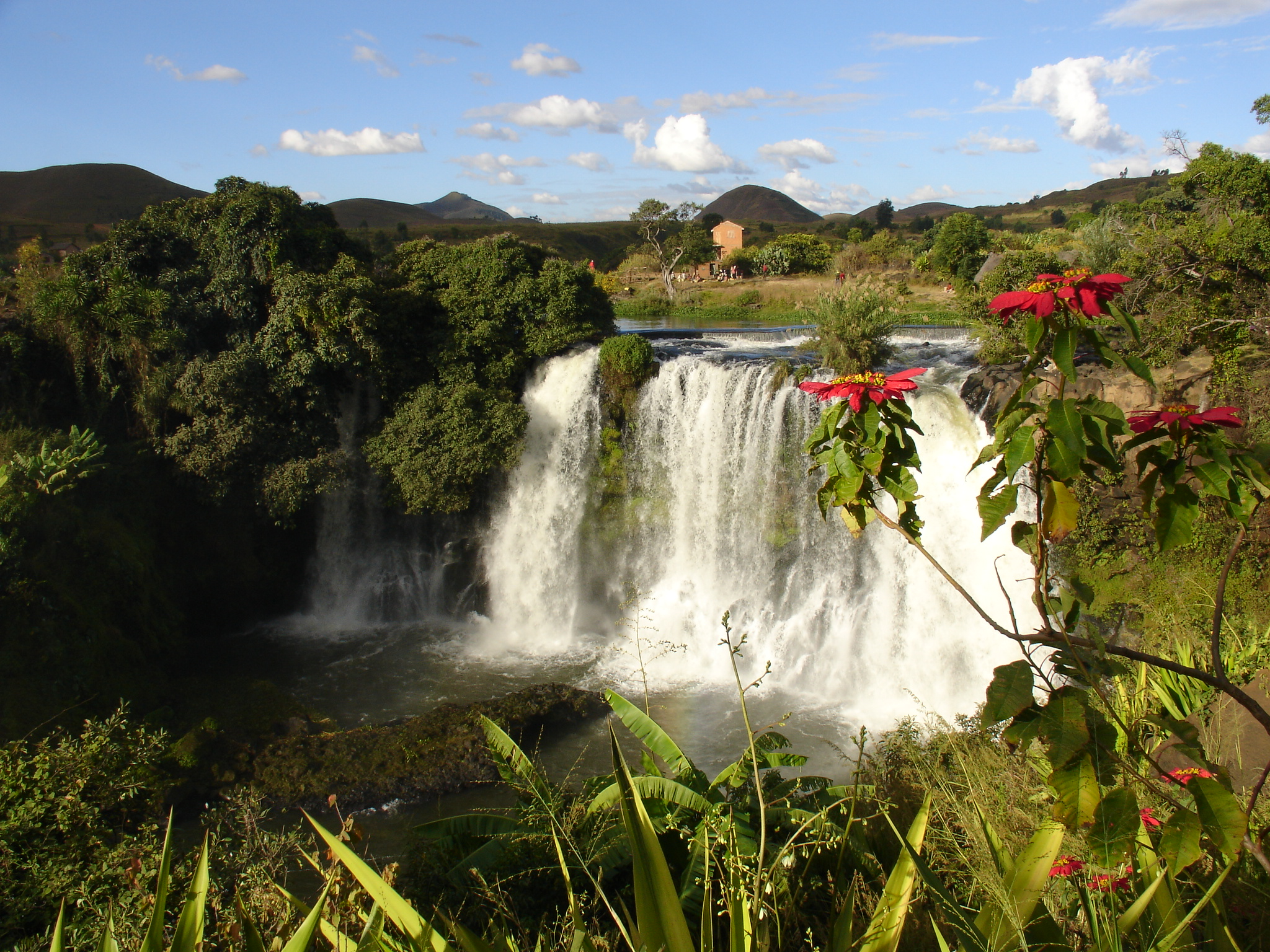
Lily waterfalls near Ampefy

The district counts 17 rivers and 20 creeks, including the Kelimahery, Mangadona and the Lily Rivers that forms also the Lily falls near Ampefy. Furthermore it borders to the Lake Itasy in the North.

== Communes ==
The district is further divided into 15 communes:

- Ambatoasana Centre
- Amberomanga
- Ambohidanerana
- Amparaky
- Ampary
- Ampefy
- Ankaranana
- Ankisabe
- Antanetibe
- Dondona
- Mahavelona
- Mananasy
- Masindray
- Soavinandriana
- Tamponala
