= Arivonimamo II =

- Location in Madagascar
- Coordinates: 18°58′S 47°11′E
- Country: Madagascar
- Region: Itasy
- District: Arivonimamo

Area
  - Total: 312 km^{2} (120 sq mi)
- Elevation: 1,373 m (4,505 ft)

Population (2009)
  - Total: 20,392
  - Ethnicities: Merina
- Time zone: UTC3 (EAT)
- Postal code: 112

Arivonimamo II is a rural municipality in Itasy, Madagascar. It belongs to the district of Arivonimamo, which is a part of Itasy Region. The population of the commune was estimated to be approximately 10,000 in 2001 commune census. It is situated at 48km west from the country's capital Antananarivo and 50 km east from Miarinarivo.

Only primary schooling is available. The majority 99.5% of the population of the commune are farmers. The most important crops are rice and tomato, while other important agricultural products are cucumber, cassava and potatoes. Services provide employment for 0.5% of the population.

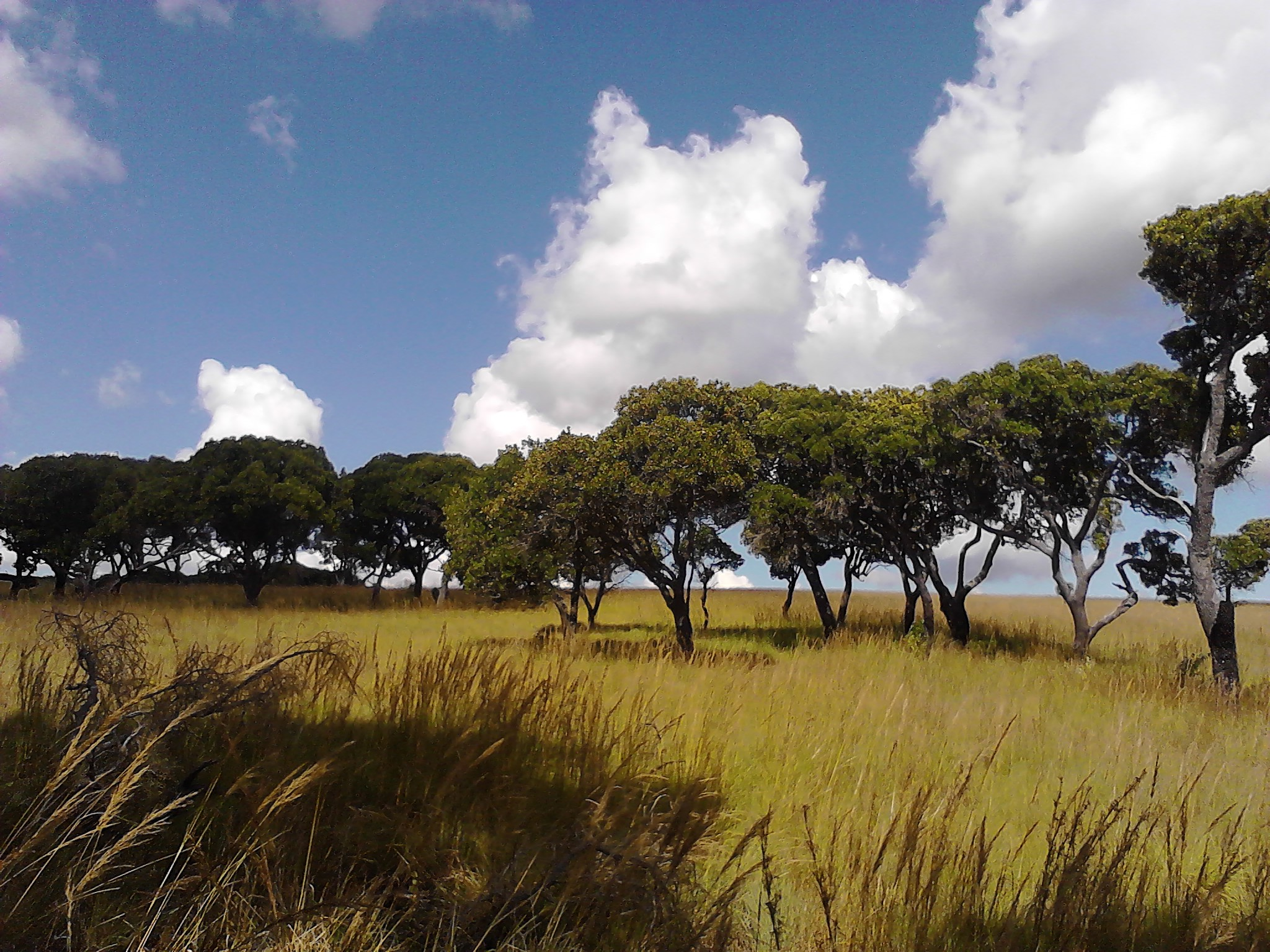
Tapia forest

Around this municipality there are plots of the natural forest of typical endemic species Uapaca bojeri, commonly known as Tapia forests. These forests supplies the village with fruits, champignons and wild silk.

== Roads ==
This municipality is crossed by the National road 1.

== Rivers ==
- Onive River

== Lakes ==
The Antaboaka lake

== See also ==
- Vatolaivy, a village of this municipality.
- Betafo, Arivonimamo, another village in this municipality
