= Ambohimasina, Arivonimamo =

Ambohimasina
- Location in Madagascar
- Coordinates: 18°48′S 47°14′E
- Country: Madagascar
- Region: Itasy
- District: Arivonimamo
- Elevation: 1,263 m (4,144 ft)

Population (2001)
  - Total: 5,000
  - Ethnicities: Merina
- Time zone: UTC3 (EAT)
- Postal code: 112

Ambohimasina is a rural municipality in Madagascar. It belongs to the district of Arivonimamo, which is a part of Itasy Region. The population of the commune was estimated to be approximately 5,000 in 2001 commune census.

Primary and junior level secondary education are available in town. The majority 100% of the population of the commune are farmers. The most important crop is rice, while other important products are pineapple, beans, cassava and tomato.

== Energy ==
In 2022 a hydroelectric power station with a capacity of 28 MW was opened in Ambohimasina.
