= Vatolaivy =

- Village (fokontany)
- Location in Madagascar
- Coordinates: 18°58′S 47°07′E
- Country: Madagascar
- Region: Itasy
- District: Arivonimamo
- Municipality: Arivonimamo II
- Elevation: 1,350 m (4,430 ft)

Population
  - Ethnicities: Merina
- Time zone: UTC3 (EAT)
- Postal code: 112

Vatolaivy is a small village that belongs to the municipality of Arivonimamo II, 70 km west of Antananarivo, Madagascar.

There are Catholic and Protestant churches, a primary school, shops, a market place, a hostel and restaurant, and a sport area.

Around this little village there are plots of the natural forest of typical endemic species Uapaca bojeri, commonly known as Tapia forests. These forests supplies the village with fruits, champignons and wild silk.

These plots of forests are now under transferred management to local communities. This process called GELOSE is set to help for their conservation. these "native trees" are used to feed silkworm and thus to produce raw material for weavers and handcraft maker. The end products provides external incomes for these communities.
