= Morarano, Arivonimamo =

Morarano
- Location in Madagascar
- Coordinates: 18°54′S 47°19′E
- Country: Madagascar
- Region: Itasy
- District: Arivonimamo
- Elevation: 1,272 m (4,173 ft)

Population (2001)
  - Total: 13,000
  - Ethnicities: Merina
- Time zone: UTC3 (EAT)

Morarano is a town and commune in Madagascar. It belongs to the district of Arivonimamo, which is a part of Itasy Region. The population of the commune was estimated to be approximately 13,000 in 2001 commune census.

Only primary schooling is available. The majority 99% of the population of the commune are farmers. The most important crop is rice, while other important products are maize, cassava and tomato. Services provide employment for 1% of the population.
