= Ankisabe =

- Location in Madagascar
- Coordinates: 19°17′S 46°29′E
- Country: Madagascar
- Region: Itasy
- District: Soavinandriana
- Elevation: 935 m (3,068 ft)

Population (2001)
  - Total: 15,000
  - Ethnicities: Merina
- Time zone: UTC3 (EAT)

Ankisabe is a town and commune in Madagascar. It belongs to the district of Soavinandriana, which is a part of Itasy Region. The population of the commune was estimated to be approximately 15,000 in 2001 commune census.

Primary and junior level secondary education are available in town. The majority 95% of the population of the commune are farmers, while an additional 4% receives their livelihood from raising livestock. The most important crop is rice, while other important products are peanuts and maize. Services provide employment for 1% of the population.
