= Amberomanga =

Amberomanga Amberomanga Atsinanana
- Location in Madagascar
- Coordinates: 19°15′S 46°37′E
- Country: Madagascar
- Region: Itasy
- District: Soavinandriana
- Elevation: 1,054 m (3,458 ft)

Population (2018)
  - Total: 8,772
  - Ethnicities: Merina
- Time zone: UTC3 (EAT)
- Postal code: 118

Amberomanga is a rural municipality in Madagascar. It belongs to the district of Soavinandriana, which is a part of Itasy Region. The population of the commune was 8,772 in 2018.

Only primary schooling is available. The majority (97%) of the population of the commune are farmers, while an additional 1% receives their livelihood from raising livestock. The most important crop is maize, while other important products are cassava and rice. Services provide employment for 2% of the population.
