= Ankazomiriotra =

- Location in Madagascar
- Coordinates: 19°39′S 46°30′E
- Country: Madagascar
- Region: Vakinankaratra
- District: Mandoto

Area
  - Total: 404 km^{2} (156 sq mi)
- Elevation: 1,016 m (3,333 ft)

Population (2001)
  - Total: 34,000
  - Ethnicities: Merina
- Time zone: UTC3 (EAT)
- Postal code: 113

Ankazomiriotra is a rural municipality in Madagascar. It belongs to the district of Mandoto, which is a part of Vakinankaratra Region. The population of the commune was estimated to be approximately 34,000 in 2001 commune census.

Primary and junior level secondary education are available in town. The majority 75% of the population of the commune are farmers, while an additional 25% receives their livelihood from raising livestock. The most important crop is rice, while other important products are maize and cassava.

The Provincial road RIP 143 connects Ankazomiriotra with Fidirana. It is situated at 68 km from Antsirabe, the main town of Vakinankaratra.
