= Ananambao Ambary =

- Location in Madagascar
- Country: Madagascar
- Region: Vakinankaratra
- District: Mandoto (district)

Population (2018)
  - Total: 20,130
  - Ethnicities: Merina
- Time zone: UTC3 (EAT)

Ananambao Ambary is a town and commune in Madagascar. It belongs to the district of Mandoto (district), which is a part of Vakinankaratra Region. The population of the commune was 20,130 inhabitants in 2018.

Only primary schooling is available. The majority 64% of the population of the commune are farmers, while an additional 35.8% receives their livelihood from raising livestock. The most important crop is rice, while other important products are maize and cassava. Industry provides employment for 0.2% of the population.
