= Ampary =

- Location in Madagascar
- Coordinates: 19°05′44″S 46°42′40″E
- Country: Madagascar
- Region: Itasy
- District: Soavinandriana

Area
  - Total: 43.1 km^{2} (16.6 sq mi)
- Elevation: 1,035 m (3,396 ft)

Population (2015)
  - Total: 22,407
  - Ethnicities: Merina
- Time zone: UTC3 (EAT)

Ampary is a town and commune in Madagascar. It belongs to the district of Soavinandriana, which is a part of Itasy Region. The population of the commune was estimated to be approximately 22.407 in 2015.

Only primary schooling is available. The majority 80% of the population of the commune are farmers, while an additional 17% receives their livelihood from raising livestock. The most important crop is beans, while other important products are maize, cassava and tomato. Services provide employment for 2% of the population. Additionally fishing employs 1% of the population.
