= Fidirana =

- Location in Madagascar
- Coordinates: 19°30′S 46°34′E
- Country: Madagascar
- Region: Vakinankaratra
- District: Mandoto
- Elevation: 1,115 m (3,658 ft)

Population (2001)
  - Total: 25,000
  - Ethnicities: Merina
- Time zone: UTC3 (EAT)
- Postal code: 113

Fidirana is a town and commune in Madagascar. It belongs to the district of Mandoto, which is a part of Vakinankaratra Region. The population of the commune was estimated to be approximately 25,000 in 2001 commune census.

The Provincial road RIP 143 connects Fidirana with Ankazomiriotra.

Only primary schooling is available. The majority 50% of the population of the commune are farmers, while an additional 50% receives their livelihood from raising livestock. The most important crop is rice, while other important products are peanuts and maize.
