= Anjoma Ramartina =

- Location in Madagascar
- Coordinates: 19°38′S 45°58′E
- Country: Madagascar
- Region: Vakinankaratra
- District: Mandoto
- Elevation: 774 m (2,539 ft)

Population (2001)
  - Total: 15,000
  - Ethnicities: Merina
- Time zone: UTC3 (EAT)

Anjoma Ramartina is a town and commune in Madagascar. It belongs to the district of Mandoto, which is a part of Vakinankaratra Region. The population of the commune was estimated to be approximately 15,000 in 2001 commune census. It is about an hour's drive south of Antananarivo. Anjoma Ramartina sits atop some of the world's largest rose quartz deposits.

Primary and junior level secondary education are available in town. The majority 60% of the population of the commune are farmers, while an additional 39.5% receives their livelihood from raising livestock. The most important crop is rice, while other important products are maize and bambara groundnut. Industry provides employment for 0.5% of the population.

Most homes in Anjoma Ramartina have no electricity, no running water, no phone or network connections. Malnutrition is common. According to the World Bank, around 80% of those outside Madagascar's cities live below the $1.90-a-day poverty line. Health researchers found around half of parents in Anjoma Ramartina had lost at least one infant child to illness or hunger.
