= Vasiana =

- Location in Madagascar
- Coordinates: 19°38′S 46°14′E
- Country: Madagascar
- Region: Vakinankaratra
- District: Mandoto (district)
- Elevation: 887 m (2,910 ft)

Population (2018)
  - Total: 19,992
  - Ethnicities: Merina
- Time zone: UTC3 (EAT)

Vasiana is a town and commune in Madagascar. It belongs to the district of Mandoto (district), which is a part of Vakinankaratra Region. The population of the commune was 19,992 inhabitants in 2018.

Only primary schooling is available. The majority 64% of the population of the commune are farmers, while an additional 35.8% receives their livelihood from raising livestock. The most important crop is rice, while other important products are maize and cassava. Industry provides employment for 0.2% of the population.
