= Vinany =

- Location in Madagascar
- Coordinates: 19°37′S 46°29′E
- Country: Madagascar
- Region: Vakinankaratra
- District: Mandoto (district)
- Elevation: 1,026 m (3,366 ft)

Population (2018)
  - Total: 20,844
  - Ethnicities: Merina
- Time zone: UTC3 (EAT)

Vinany is a town and commune in Madagascar. It belongs to the district of Mandoto (district), which is a part of Vakinankaratra Region. The population of the commune was 20,844 inhabitants in 2018.

Only primary schooling is available. The majority 64% of the population of the commune are farmers, while an additional 35.8% receives their livelihood from raising livestock. The most important crop is rice, while other important products are maize and cassava. Industry provides employment for 0.2% of the population.

It is situated at the National road 34, about halfway from Antsirabe and Miandrivazo.
