= Ambohiborona =

- Location in Madagascar
- Coordinates: 19°24′S 47°7′E
- Country: Madagascar
- Region: Vakinankaratra
- District: Faratsiho
- Elevation: 1,680 m (5,510 ft)

Population (2001)
  - Total: 26,000
  - Ethnicities: Merina
- Time zone: UTC3 (EAT)

Ambohiborona (or Ambatofotsy Ambohiborona) is a town and commune in Madagascar. It belongs to the district of Faratsiho, which is a part of Vakinankaratra Region. The population of the commune was estimated to be approximately 26,000 in 2001 commune census.

Primary and junior level secondary education are available in town. The majority 99% of the population of the commune are farmers. The most important crop is rice, while other important products are beans, maize and potatoes. Services provide employment for 1% of the population.
