= Imerintsiatosika =

- Location in Madagascar
- Coordinates: 18°59′S 47°19′E
- Country: Madagascar
- Region: Itasy
- District: Arivonimamo

Government
  - Mayor: Parisoa Andriambolanarivo

Area
  - Total: 173 km^{2} (67 sq mi)
- Elevation: 1,301 m (4,268 ft)

Population (2018)Census
  - Total: 69,953
  - Ethnicities: Merina
- Time zone: UTC3 (EAT)
- Postal code: 112

Imerintsiatosika is a municipality in Madagascar. It belongs to the district of Arivonimamo, which is a part of Itasy Region. It is localized at 30 km west from the capital of Antananarivo on the National Road No.1. The population of the commune was found to be 69,953 in the 2018 census.

36 fokontany (villages) belong to this municipality.

Primary and junior level secondary education are available in town. The majority 98% of the population of the commune are farmers, while an additional 1% receives their livelihood from raising livestock. The most important crop is rice, while other important products are vegetables, cassava and potatoes. Services provide employment for 1% of the population.

There is a 240-metre-high (790 ft) radio station near Imeritsitosika. It belonged formerly to the NASA.

In 2021 a prison of high security was inaugurated in Imeritsitosika.

== Rivers ==
The only river of the municipality is the Katsaoka that traverses it over a length of 12 km.

== Sports ==
- Grenade FC Imerintsiatosika (football)

== Archeological sites ==
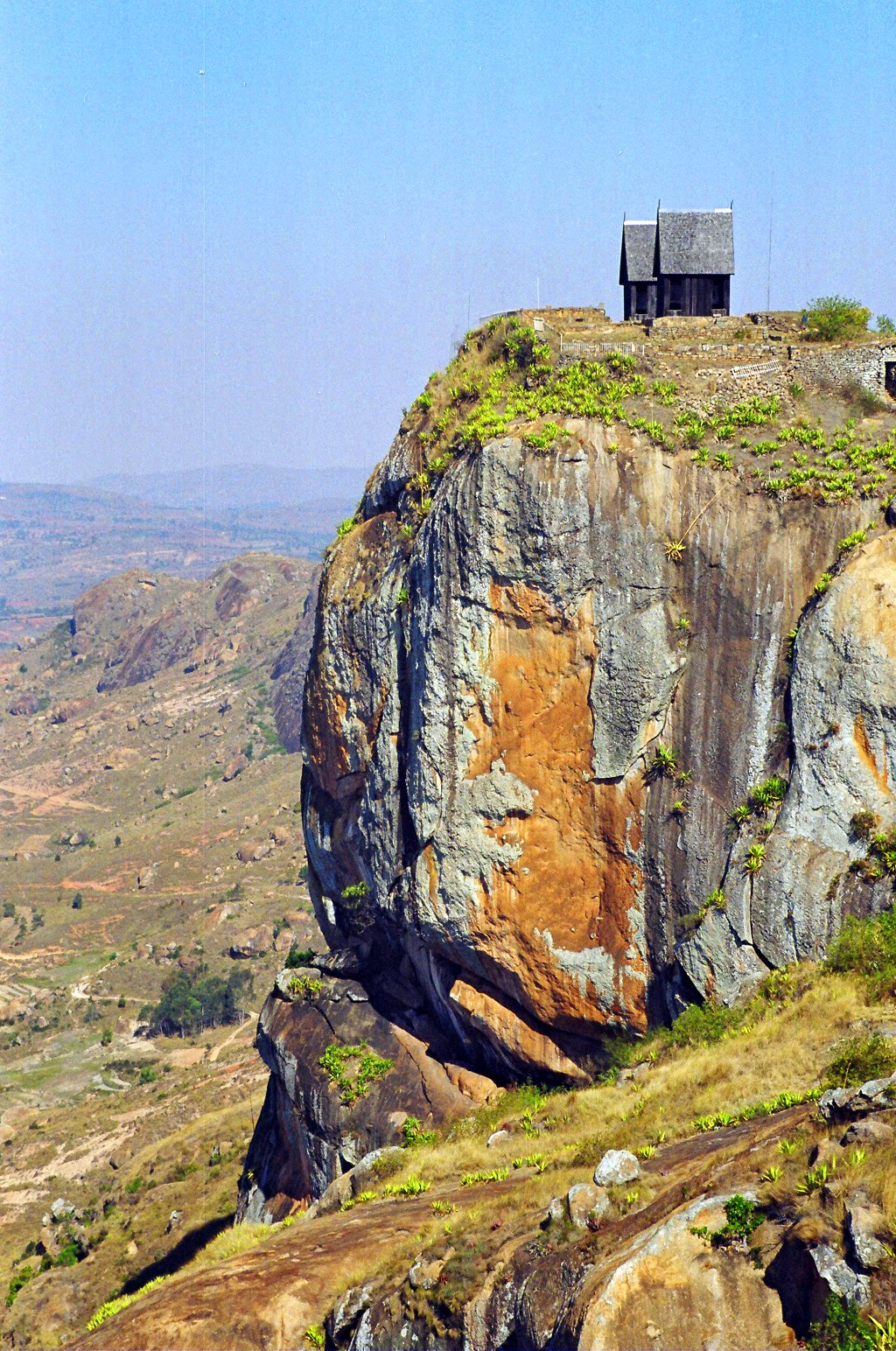
Antongona

The Rova Antongona and royal tomb, 6 km north of Imerintsiatosika.
