= Besohana =

- Location in Madagascar
- Country: Madagascar
- Region: Vakinankaratra
- District: Mandoto (district)

Population (2018)
  - Total: 12,839
  - Ethnicities: Merina
- Time zone: UTC3 (EAT)
- Postal code: 113

Besohana is a rural municipality in Madagascar. It belongs to the district of Mandoto, which is a part of Vakinankaratra Region. The population of the commune was 12,839 inhabitants in 2018.

Concerning education, only primary schooling is available. The majority, 64% of the population of the commune, are farmers, while an additional of 35.8% receives their livelihood from raising livestock. The most important crop is rice, while other important products are maize and cassava. Industry provides employment for 0.2% of the population.

The Provincial Road RIP 138 connects Betsohana with Ambatolahy.
