= Faratsiho District =

Faratsiho (district)
- Location in Madagascar
- Coordinates: 19°24′00″S 46°57′00″E
- Country: Madagascar
- Region: Vakinankaratra
- District: Faratsiho District

Area
  - Total: 2,015 km^{2} (778 sq mi)

Population (2018)
  - Total: 237,162
- Postal code: 114
- Climate: Cwb

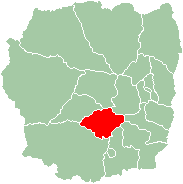
Location map of Faratsiho region in Antananarivo province

Faratsiho District is found in Vakinankaratra Region, Madagascar. Its capital is the town of Faratsiho. The district covers an area of 2,015 km^{2}, with a total population estimated at 222,922 in 2018.

== Communes ==
The district is further divided into nine communes:

- Ambohiborona
- Andranomiady
- Antsapanimahazo
- Faratsiho
- Miandrarivo
- Ramainandro
- Valabetokana
- Vinaninony-Atsimo
- Vinaninony Nord

== Roads ==
The district and the town of Faratsiho is crossed by the National road 43 (Analavory-Antsirabe).

== Rivers ==
3 rivers cross the municipality of Faratsiho: Kitsamby, Sahomby and the Mahasetroka river. The Sahasarotra river crosses this district from east to west.

== Nature ==
- Faratsiho Natural Park
