= Ankaranana =

- Location in Madagascar
- Coordinates: 19°3′2″S 46°37′11″E
- Country: Madagascar
- Region: Itasy
- District: Soavinandriana
- Elevation: 1,054 m (3,458 ft)

Population (2001)
  - Total: 8,000
  - Ethnicities: Merina
- Time zone: UTC3 (EAT)

Ankaranana is a rural village and commune in Madagascar. It belongs to the district of Soavinandriana, which is a part of Itasy Region. The population of the village is 2,100 while the whole commune was estimated to be approximately 8,000 in the 2001 commune census.

Primary and secondary schooling is available. The majority (99%) of the population of the commune are farmers. They practice reach small-scale farming on volcanic soil. A very well known product of Ankaranana is cassava because of his great sweetness (low cyanide contain), that allows short cooking time without risk of toxicity. Other important products are beans (3 crops/year), cress, maize, rice. Small-scale silkwormbreeding since 2009. Services provide employment for 1% of the population.
