= Mandoto District =

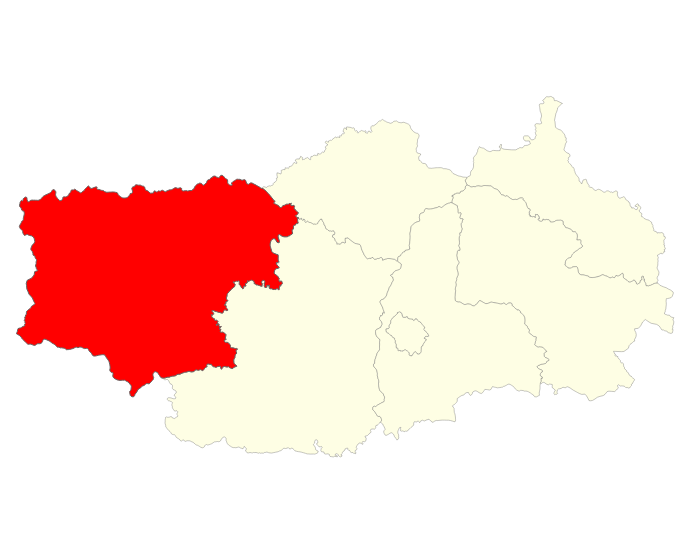
- Mandoto district

- Location in Madagascar
- Coordinates: 19°34′S 46°17′E
- Country: Madagascar
- Region: Vakinankaratra
- District: Mandoto

Area
  - Total: 4,500 km^{2} (1,700 sq mi)
- Elevation: 817 m (2,680 ft)

Population (2018)Region Vakinatra
  - Total: 227,800
  - Ethnicities: Merina
- Time zone: UTC3 (EAT)
- Postal code: 113

Mandoto is a town, commune and district in Madagascar. It belongs to the Vakinankaratra Region. The population of the district was estimated to be approximately 227,800 in 2018. It was formed by splitting up the district of Betafo.

== Geography ==
This district is situated on the route nationale No.34 at 117 km West of Antsirabe and 129 km East of Miandrivazo. It is also crossed by the RIP 143 Ankazomiriotra – Fidirana, RIP 138 Ambatolahy – Betsohana and RIP 143bis Viliabe (Mandoto) – Vasiana.

== Communes ==
The district is further divided into nine communes:

- Anjoma Ramartina
- Vinany
- Vasiana
- Ankazomiriotra
- Ananambao Ambary
- Besohana
- Fidirana
- Mandoto
- Maromandray
