= Vinaninony Nord =

- Location in Madagascar
- Coordinates: 19°29′S 47°1′E
- Country: Madagascar
- Region: Vakinankaratra
- District: Faratsiho
- Elevation: 1,934 m (6,345 ft)

Population (2001)
  - Total: 8,000
  - Ethnicities: Merina
- Time zone: UTC3 (EAT)

Vinaninony Nord (Vinaninony Avaratra) is a town and commune in Madagascar. It belongs to the district of Faratsiho, which is a part of Vakinankaratra Region. The population of the commune was estimated to be approximately 8,000 in 2001 commune census.

Primary and junior level secondary education are available in town. Farming and raising livestock provides employment for 49% and 46% of the working population. The most important crop are potatoes, while other important products are beans, maize and rice. Services provide employment for 5% of the population.
