= Valabetokana =

- Location in Madagascar
- Coordinates: 19°20′S 46°46′E
- Country: Madagascar
- Region: Vakinankaratra
- District: Faratsiho
- Elevation: 1,443 m (4,734 ft)

Population (2001)
  - Total: 7,000
  - Ethnicities: Merina
- Time zone: UTC3 (EAT)

Valabetokana (also Ambatoasana Valabetokana) is a town and commune in Madagascar. It belongs to the district of Faratsiho, which is a part of Vakinankaratra Region. The population of the commune was estimated to be approximately 7,000 in 2001 commune census.

Only primary schooling is available. The majority 98% of the population of the commune are farmers, while an additional 1% receives their livelihood from raising livestock. The most important crop is rice, while other important products are maize and potatoes. Services provide employment for 1% of the population.
