= Antongona =

Archaeological site in Madagascar

Coordinates: 18°56′S 47°17′E

The archaeological site of Antongona is located in the Itasy Region of Madagascar (formerly Imamo), roughly 36 km (22 mi) west of Antananarivo and 6 km (3.7 mi) north of Imerintsiatosika, Itasy.

== Site Description ==
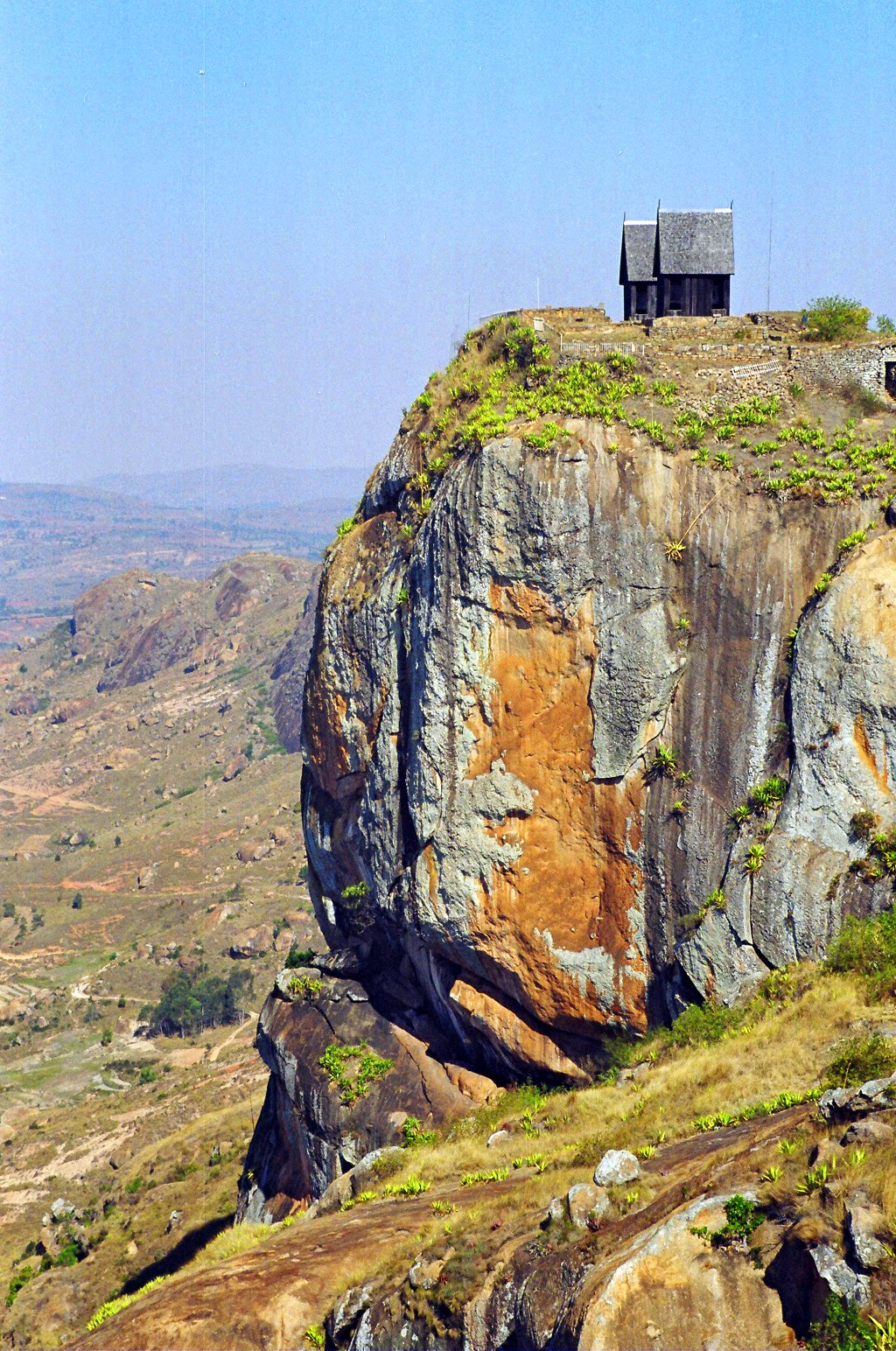
Antogona

Antongona is a sacred hill, it consists of two royal houses dated from the 16th and 18th centuries AD, spaced roughly 300 m (980 ft) apart and a royal tomb. Situated on natural rock formations, stone walls and doorways augmented the inherent defensive qualities of the rock formations constructed upon. From the center of the structure, a full 360° view was obtained of the surrounding landscape, further exemplifying the defensive quality of the sites.

There is also a small museum that is open from 14h to 16h.

== World Heritage Status ==
This site was added to the Tentative List of UNESCO World Heritage Sites in Madagascar on November 14, 1997, in the Cultural category.

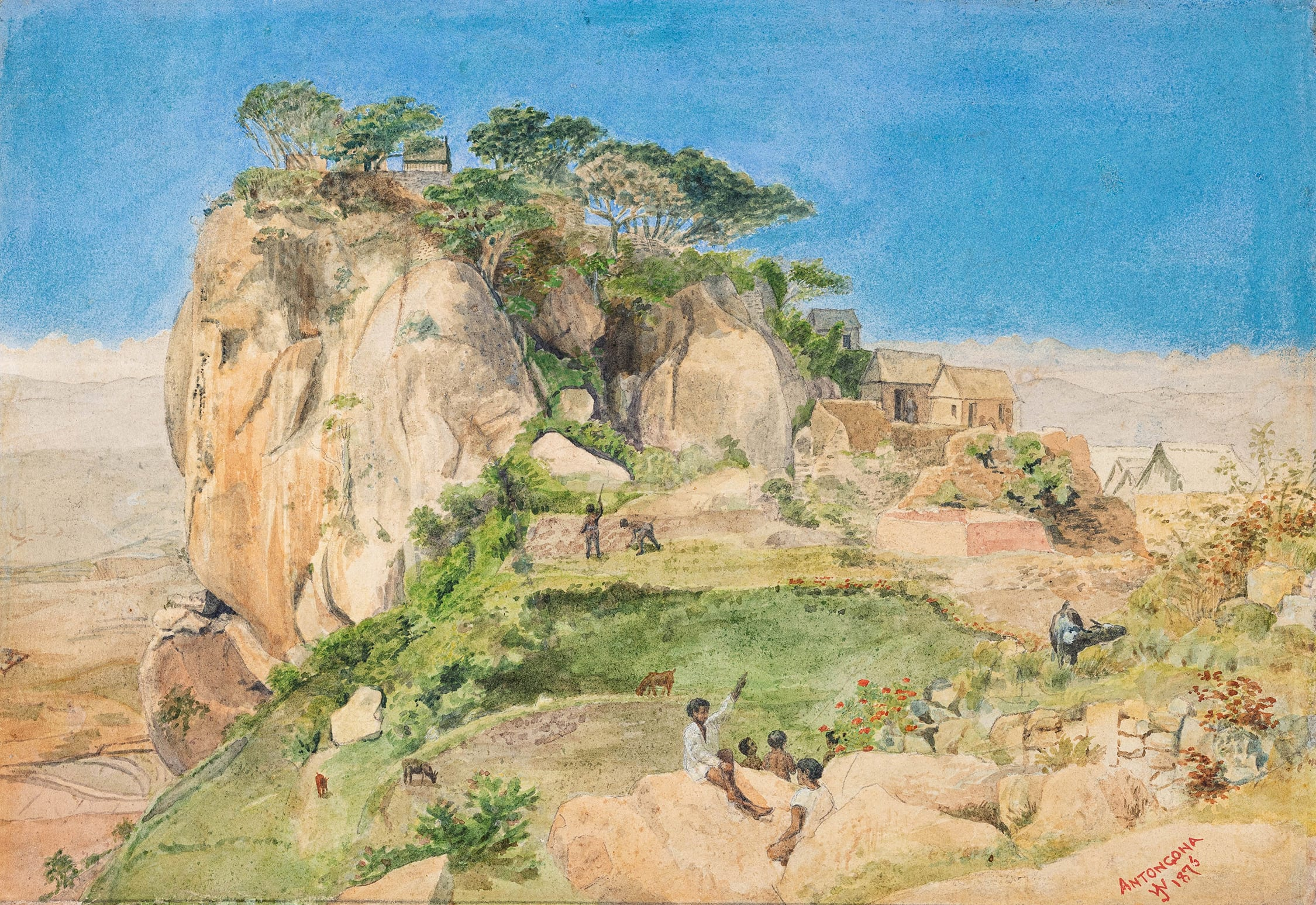
A painting of the Rova Antongona from 1875
