= Henri François Victor Randrianjatovo =

Malagasy politician

Henri François Victor Randrianjatovo (deceased 2021, aged 74 years) was a Malagasy politician and sportsman. He was elected a member of the National Assembly of Madagascar, he was elected as a member of the Tiako I Madagasikara party in the 2007 Malagasy parliamentary elections; he represented the constituency of Faratsiho.

== Career ==
He was also the Champion of Madagascar in High Jump in 1965, a basketball player at SO Emyrnen, the captain of the Madagascar men's national basketball team from 1971 to 1979, the Malagasy Technical director of basketball from 1983-1987, president of the Malagasy League of Basketball and FIBA coach.

He also had been the Minister of Youth and Sports from 5 January 2004 to 2009.
