= Maromandray =

- Location in Madagascar
- Coordinates: 19°35′S 46°25′E
- Country: Madagascar
- Region: Vakinankaratra
- District: Mandoto
- Established: 2015

Population (2019)Census
  - Total: 8,399
  - Ethnicities: Merina
- Time zone: UTC3 (EAT)
- postal code: 113

Maromandray is a rural municipality in Madagascar. It belongs to the district of Mandoto, which is a part of Vakinankaratra Region. It has 8 399 inhabitants.
