= Raymond Rakotozandry =

Malagasy politician

Raymond Rakotozandry is a Malagasy politician. A member of the National Assembly of Madagascar, he was elected as a member of the Tiako I Madagasikara party in the 2007 Malagasy parliamentary elections; he represents the constituency of Mandoto.

He was arrested during the Coup d'Etat 2009 for trying to open a session of the parliament.
