= Faratsiho =

Faratsiho Faratsiho
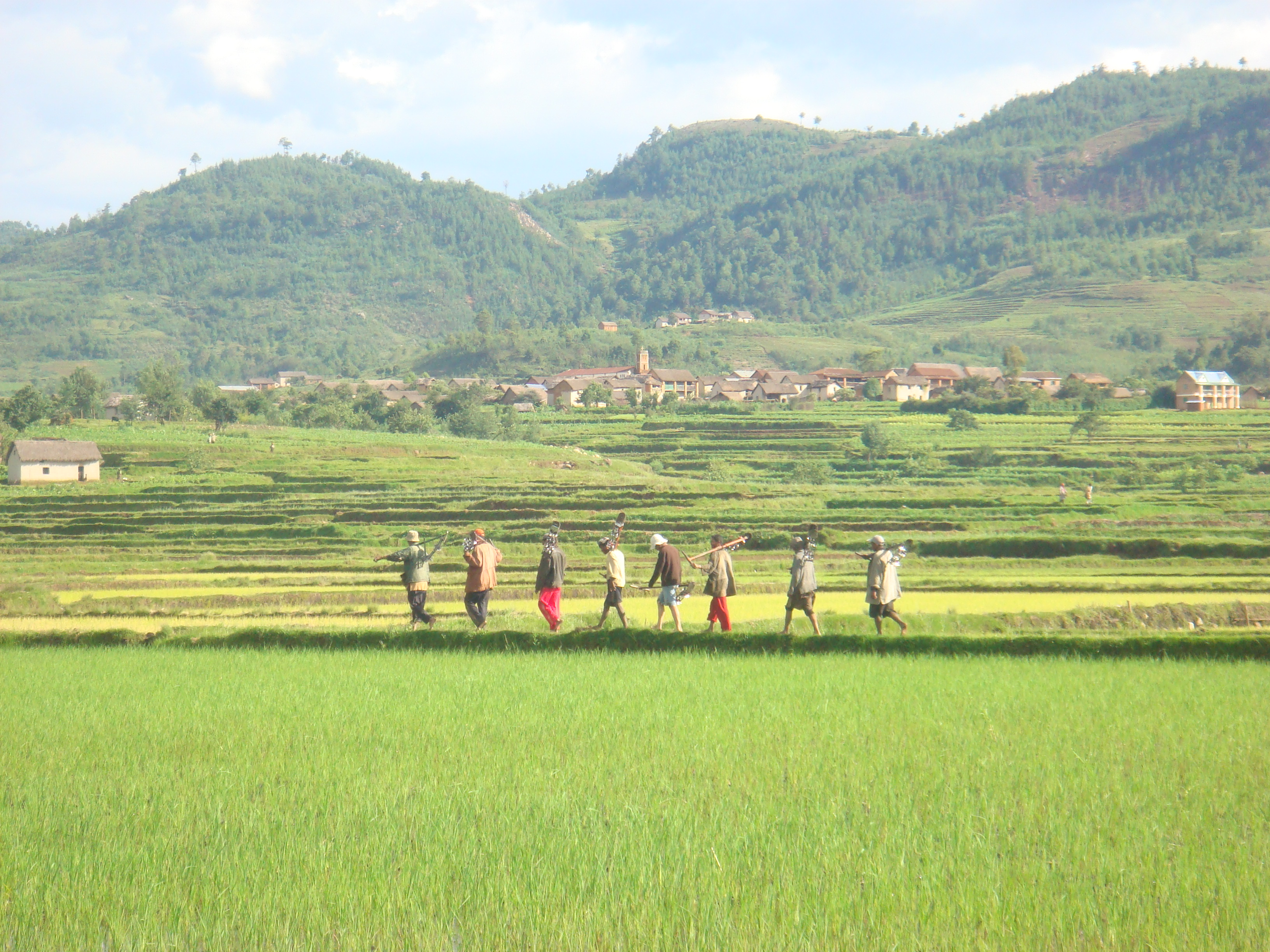
- Faratsiho

- Location in Madagascar
- Coordinates: 19°24′00″S 46°57′00″E
- Country: Madagascar
- Region: Vakinankaratra
- District: Faratsiho District

Government
  - Mayor: Jean Claude Randriamanantena
- Elevation: 1,720 m (5,640 ft)

Population (2018)
  - Total: 46,569
- Census
- Postal code: 114
- Climate: Cwb

Faratsiho is a town in the Vakinankaratra Region of Madagascar. It is the capital of the Faratsiho District.

It has a population of 46,569, 93% of whom are farmers. Being located at an altitude of 1720m, it is the highest city in Madagascar.

It is located on the RN 43 from Ambohibary – Faratsiho – Soavinandriana.

Faratsihite, a mineral, was named after the town.

== Rivers ==
3 rivers cross the municipality of Faratsiho: Kitsamby, Sahomby and the Mahasetroka river.

== Nature ==
- Faratsiho Natural Park
