= Mandoto =

- Location in Madagascar
- Coordinates: 19°34′S 46°17′E
- Country: Madagascar
- Region: Vakinankaratra
- District: Mandoto
- Elevation: 817 m (2,680 ft)

Population (2001)
  - Total: 37,000
  - Ethnicities: Merina
- Time zone: UTC3 (EAT)
- Postal code: 113

Mandoto is a town and commune in Madagascar. It belongs to the district of Mandoto, which is a part of Vakinankaratra Region. The population of the commune was estimated to be approximately 37,000 in 2001 commune census.

Primary and junior level secondary education are available in town. The majority 80% of the population of the commune are farmers, while an additional 18% receives their livelihood from raising livestock. The most important crop is rice, while other important products are maize and cassava. Services provide employment for 2% of the population.

== Geography ==
This town is situated on the route nationale No.34 at 117 km West of Antsirabe and 129 km East of Miandrivazo.

Its a town infestated by rats and the pest.
