= Arivonimamo =

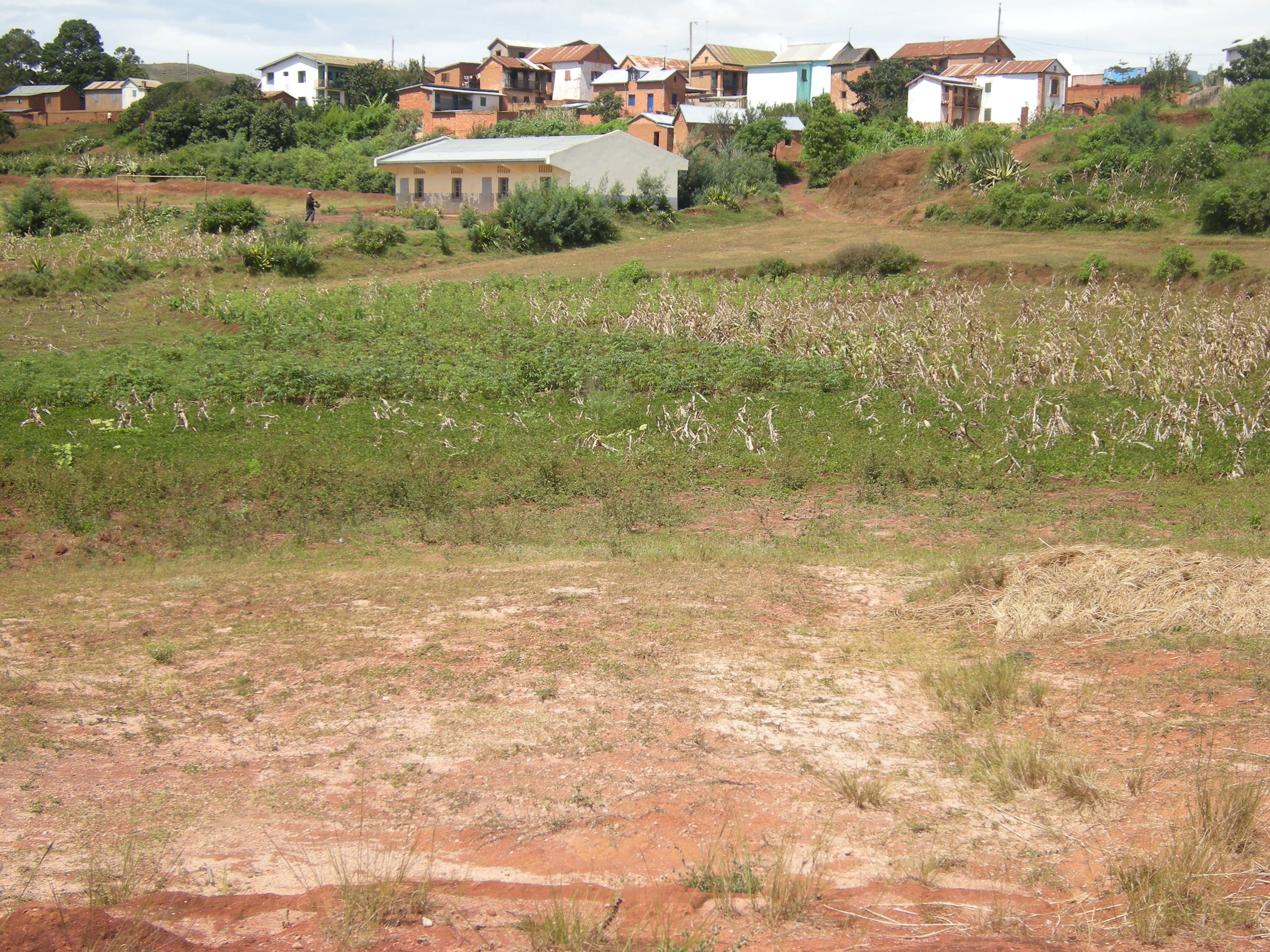
- Ampahimanga Arivonimamo

- Location in Madagascar
- Coordinates: 19°02′S 47°10′E
- Country: Madagascar
- Region: Itasy
- District: Arivonimamo
- Established: 16 April 1951

Government
  - Mayor: Randriamirado Harinosy Onja

Area
  - Total: 120 km^{2} (46 sq mi)

Population (2018)
  - Total: 28,324
  - Ethnicities: Merina (91%)
- Time zone: UTC3 (EAT)
- Postal code: 112

Arivonimamo is a city (commune urbaine) in Itasy Region, in the Central Highlands of Madagascar.

Arivonimamo is connected by the National Road No.1 to Antananarivo (50 km in the east) and Tsiroanomandidy (west). The Antananarivo international airport was there until replaced by Ivato in 1967. Now it is an airbase.

It borders to the communes of Miarinarivo in the west, Antananarivo and the Analamanga region in the North-east.

== Climate ==
Climate data for Arivonimamo
Month	Jan	Feb	Mar	Apr	May	Jun	Jul	Aug	Sep	Oct	Nov	Dec	Year
Mean daily maximum °C (°F)	26 (79)	26 (78)	25 (77)	25 (77)	23 (73)	21 (70)	20 (68)	22 (71)	23 (74)	26 (78)	26 (79)	26 (79)	24 (75)
Mean daily minimum °C (°F)	15 (59)	14 (58)	15 (59)	13 (55)	11 (51)	8 (47)	8 (46)	8 (46)	9 (48)	11 (52)	13 (56)	14 (58)	12 (53)
Average precipitation mm (inches)	330 (12.8)	210 (8.2)	220 (8.6)	36 (1.4)	18 (0.7)	10 (0.4)	5.1 (0.2)	13 (0.5)	5.1 (0.2)	64 (2.5)	130 (5.1)	210 (8.3)	1,240 (48.8)
Source: Weatherbase

== Administration ==
Arivonimamo is the district capital made up of twenty-one municipalities.

== Infrastructure ==
Until 1967, the city hosted Antananarivo-Arivonimamo International Airport before it was replaced by Ivato Airport. Since 1976, Ivato Airport has housed a flight school and a tactical air base. In 2021, the latter merged with Ivato Air Base to form Air Base 213, now located in Arivonimamo.

== Sports ==
The soccer club of Arivonimamo is RDN Arivonimamo plays in the Madagascar Football Championship.

== Notes and references ==
1. “ [ archive ] ” [PDF], on Centre national Legis, January 27, 2021
2. fr.soccerway.com [ archive ]

== See also ==
- Betafo, a fokontany within Arivonimamo.
- Vatolaivy
