= Arivonimamo Air Base =

Airport in Madagascar

- IATA: none; ICAO: FMMA

Summary
- Airport type: Military
- Location: Arivonimamo
- Elevation AMSL: 4,757 ft / 1,450 m
- Coordinates: 19°01′45″S 47°10′19″E

Map
- Location of the airport in Madagascar

Runways
Direction	Length		Surface
Direction	ft	m	Surface
12/30	8,237	2,511	Asphalt
- Sources: World Aero Data

Arivonimamo Air Base (ICAO: FMMA), or simply Antananarivo Arivonimamo Air Base, is a military airport located in Arivonimamo, Madagascar.
