= Arivonimamo District =

Arivonimamo
- District
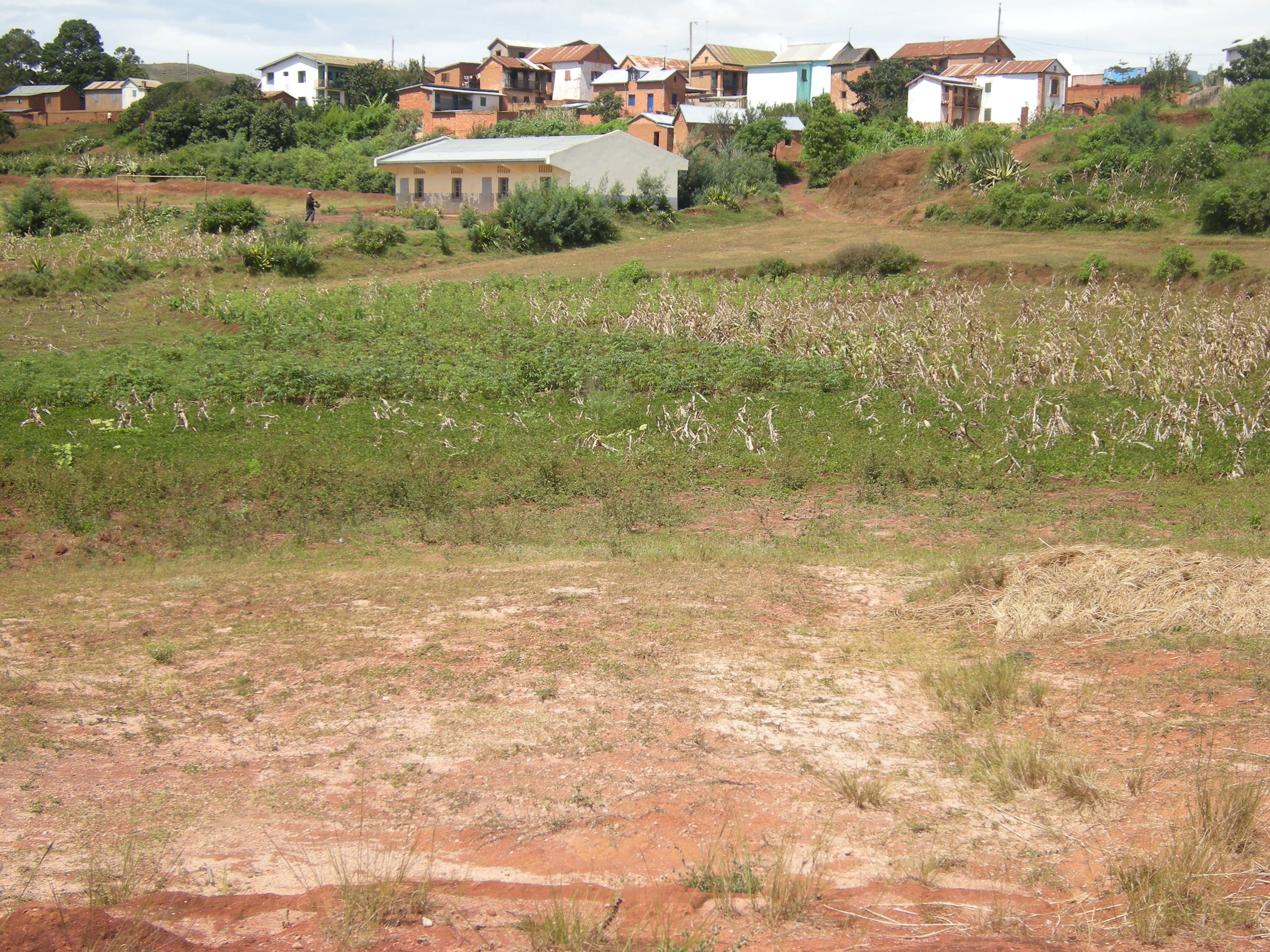
- Arivonimamo

- Location within Madagascar
- Coordinates: 19°02′S 47°10′E
- Country: Madagascar
- Region: Itasy

Area
  - Land: 489 sq mi (1,267 km^{2})

Population
  - Total: 260,261
- Postal code: 112

Arivonimamo is a district of Itasy in Madagascar.

== Communes ==
The district is further divided into 22 communes:

- Alkamisikely
- Ambatomanga
- Ambatomirahavavy
- Amboanana
- Ambohimandry
- Ambohimasina
- Ambohipandrano
- Ambohitrambo
- Ampahimanga
- Andranomiely
- Antambolo
- Antenimbe
- Arivonimamo
- Arivonimamo II
- Imeritsitosika
- Mahatsinjo Est
- Manalalondo
- Marofangady
- Miantsoarivo
- Morafeno
- Morarano
- Talata Tsimadilo

== Roads ==
This district is crossed by the National road 1.
