= Soavinandriana =

- Location within Madagascar
- Coordinates: 19°10′S 46°44′E
- Country: Madagascar
- Region: Itasy
- District: Soavinandriana

Area
  - Land: 199 km^{2} (77 sq mi)
- Elevation: 1,298 m (4,259 ft)

Population (2018)
  - Total: 40,045
  - Ethnicities: Merina
- Time zone: UTC3 (EAT)
- Postal code: 118

Soavinandriana is a rural municipality in Madagascar. It belongs to the district of Soavinandriana, which is a part of Itasy Region. The population of the commune was 40,045 in 2018.

Only primary schooling is available. The majority 99% of the population of the commune are farmers. The most important crop is rice, while other important products are maize, cassava and tobacco. Services provide employment for 1% of the population.

Tobacco is an important factor of the local community.

== Roads ==
It is localized on the National Road 43, about 40 km (25 mi) from Analavory and 140 km (87 mi) from the capital Antananarivo.

== Nature ==
The Ramanavy forest (Forêt de Ramanavy, or translated: Bats Forest) at 10 km (6.2 mi) from Soavinandriana, that hosts some 20 endemic species of plants. The Lake Itasy, the forth mayor lake of Madagascar, is partly situated in this municipality.
