= Route nationale 43 (Madagascar) =

Road in Madagascar

Location
- Country: Madagascar

Highway system
- Roads in Madagascar

Route nationale 43 (RN 43) is a secondary highway in Madagascar of 133 km, running from Analavory to the intersection with RN 7. It crosses the region of Vakinankaratra and Itasy.

It has recently been repaved.

== Selected locations on route ==
(north to south)

- Analavory - (intersection with RN 1 from Antananarivo, near Sambaina)
- Ampefy
- Soavinandriana
- Ambohibary - (intersection with RN 7)

== See also ==
- List of roads in Madagascar
- Transport in Madagascar
