= Itasy Region =

- Region
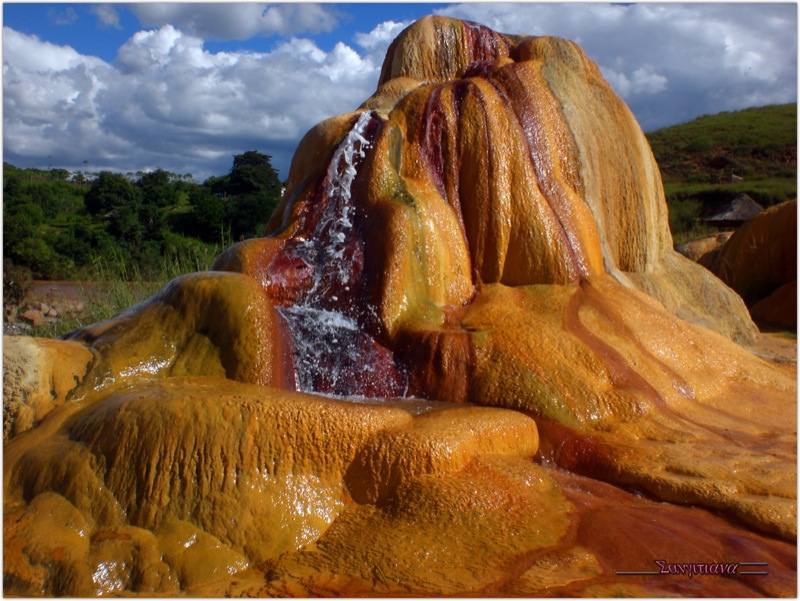
- Analavory geyser near Ampefy

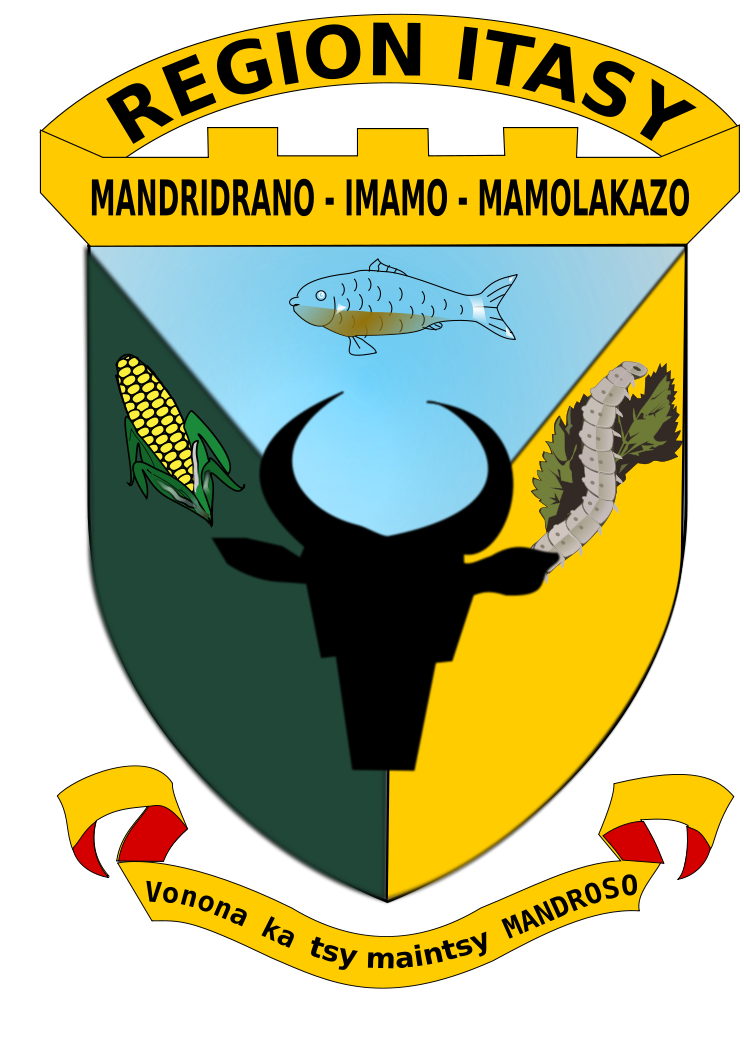
- Coat of arms

- Location in Madagascar
- Coordinates: 19°S 46.7667°E
- Country: Madagascar
- Capital: Miarinarivo

Government
  - Gouvernor: Solofonirina Maherizo Andriamanana

Area
  - Total: 6,993 km^{2} (2,700 sq mi)

Population (2018)
  - Total: 897,962
  - Density: 128.4/km^{2} (332.6/sq mi)
  - Ethnicities: Merina
- Time zone: UTC3 (EAT)
- HDI (2018): 0.520 low · 11th of 22

Itasy is a region in central Madagascar. It borders Analamanga region in northeast, Vakinankaratra in south and Bongolava in northwest. The capital of the region is Miarinarivo, and the population was 897,962 in 2018. It is the smallest of all the 22 regions in area with 6,993 km^{2} (2,700 sq mi), and is the most densely populated region after Analamanga.

== Geography ==
The region of Itasy is named after Lake Itasy, the fourth largest lake in Madagascar. The lake is in Ampefy, 120 km from the capital city of Antananarivo. There are also 58 rivers in Itasy. 21 rivers flow in Miarinarivo District, 17 rivers in Arivonimamo District and 20 in Soavinandriana District. 3,500 ha are covered by lakes: there are 40 lakes in Miarinarivo, 9 in Soavinandriana and 2 in Arivonimamo.

=== Administrative divisions ===
Itasy Region is divided into three districts, which are sub-divided into 51 communes.

- Arivonimamo District – 22 communes
- Miarinarivo District – 12 communes
- Soavinandriana District – 15 communes

=== Sights ===
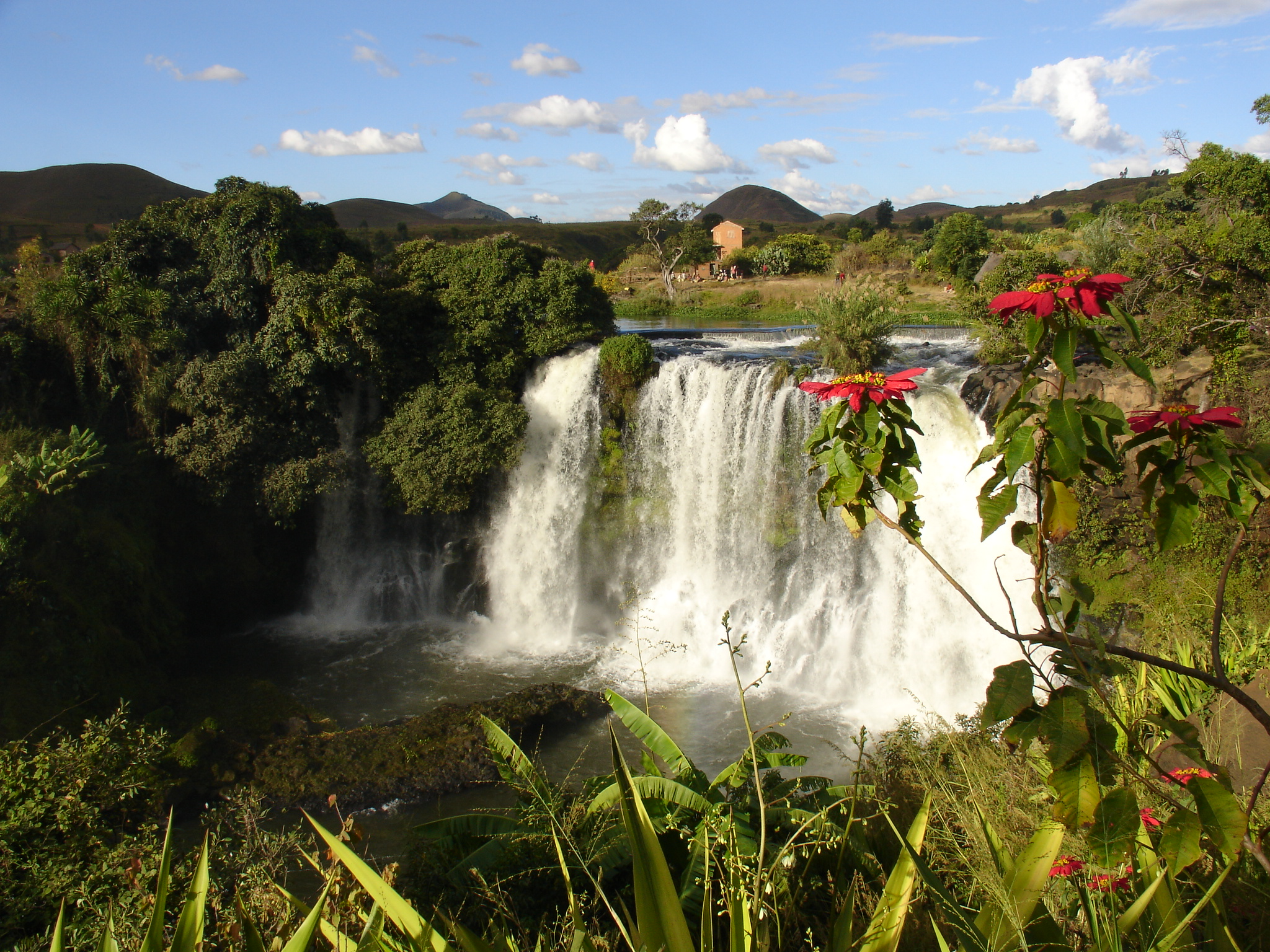
The waterfalls of the Lily

The region is famous for several features:

- Lake Itasy, which is a source of livelihood for 3,000 fisherman, with over 100 small canoes out daily;
- The monument of the Virgin Mary, on the edge of the lake, marking the very centre of the country;
- The isle of the Lake Itasy King, with a stone circle;
- The two Lily Waterfalls, of which the first is 16 m high by 35 m wide and the second over 22 m high, but not as wide;
- Analavory Chute, which is over 20 m high;
- Over 20 small lakes;
- The Analavory geysers, which are coldwater geysers that occasionally reach a height of nearly 3 m and have formed high travertine mounds;
- An ancient double-moated hillfort which can be seen near the town of Soavinandriana;
- Substantial numbers of huge extinct volcanic craters, some with crater lakes; and
- Lemurs' Park, which is seen at PK 22 (22 km) en route to Lake Itasy from the capital city.

== Infrastructure ==
=== Airport ===
- Arivonimamo Airbase

=== Roads ===
The National road 1, National road 1bis and National road 43 cross this region.

== Tourism ==
According to the ONTM (Office National de Tourism de Madagascar), more 60% of domestic tourists from the capital city use this as their short-stay holiday destination each year. However, this still amounts to less than 200 tourists per day, or up to 1,200 tourists per day on national holidays. Ampefy, by lake Itasy, is the main tourist town.

== Agriculture ==
Base of the economy is agriculture. Main crops and their size of cultivation (ha) are:

- Rice (66000 ha)
- Peanut (37,279 ha)
- Maize (37,279 ha)
- Manioc (22,872 ha)
- Beans (12,204 ha)
- Potatoes (9,211 ha)
- Bambara groundnut (4,836 ha)
- Tomatoes (4,168 ha)
- Sweet potatoes (1,377 ha)
- Ananas (3,135 ha)
- sugar cane (222ha)

There is also cattle breeding. Itasy produces 2.7% of the zebu bread in Madagascar and 4,9 % of the porc that is raised in Madagascar.

== See also ==
- Antananarivo Province
