= Merina people =

Largest ethnic group in Madagascar

- Flag of the Merina people

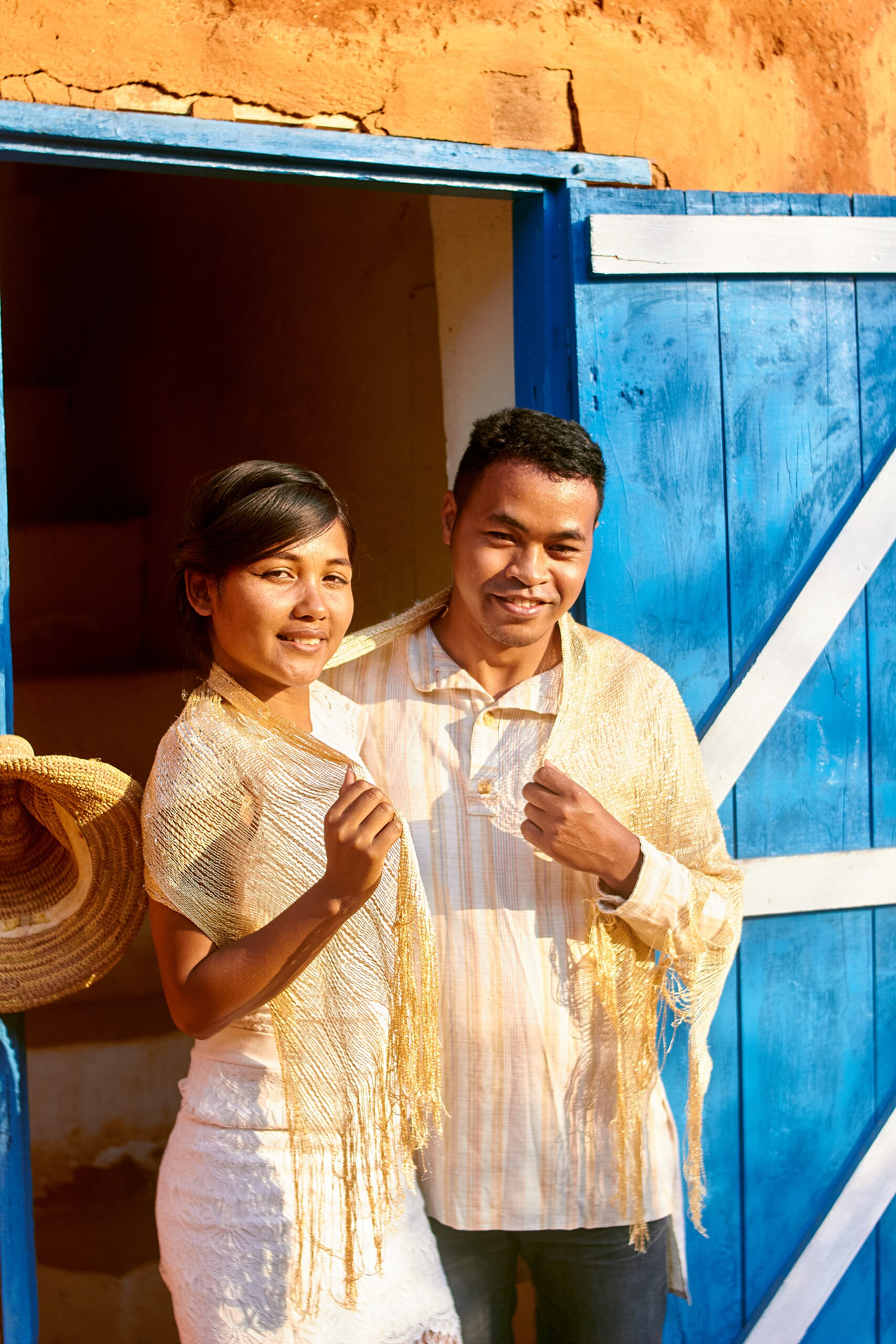
- Merina couple

Total population
- >5 million

Regions with significant populations
- Madagascar

Languages
- Merina dialect, Standard Malagasy and French

Religion
- Christianity (Both Protestant and Catholic) syncretic with traditional religions

Related ethnic groups
- Betsileo; other Malagasy groups; Austronesian peoples, Bantu peoples

The Merina people, also known as Imerina, Antimerina, Borizany or Ambaniandro, are the largest ethnic group in Madagascar. They are the "highlander" Malagasy ethnic group of the African island and one of the country's eighteen official ethnic groups. Their origins are diverse, primarily from the mixing of early Austronesian settlers who arrived from Maritime Southeast Asia before the 6th century and Bantu migrants from mainland Africa that arrived centuries later, forming the early Vazimba population. Later waves of Neo-Austronesians, along with smaller groups of Arabs, Indians and Europeans, further shaped the island's ethnic composition. They speak the Merina dialect of the official Malagasy language of Madagascar, an Austronesian language.

The Merina people are now mostly found in the center of the island (in the former Antananarivo Province). Beginning in the late 18th century, Merina sovereigns expanded the political region under their control from their interior capital outwards into the island, with their King Radama I ultimately helping unite the island under their rule. The French fought two wars against the Merina people between 1883 and 1885, and again in 1895. Following their victory, they colonised Madagascar from 1895 to 1896 and abolished the Merina monarchy in 1897.

They built innovative and elaborate irrigation infrastructure and highly productive rice farms on the highlands of Madagascar by the 18th century. The Merina people were socially stratified with hierarchical castes, inherited occupations and endogamy, and one or two of the major and long serving monarchs of the Merina people were queens.

== History ==
Austronesian people started settling in Madagascar between 200 and 500 BC. They arrived by boats and were from various southeast Asian and Oceanian groups. Later Swahili-Arabs and Indian traders came to the island's northern regions. African slaves were brought to the island's coasts between the 13th and the 18th centuries. The Portuguese traders were the first Europeans to arrive in the 15th century, followed by other European powers.

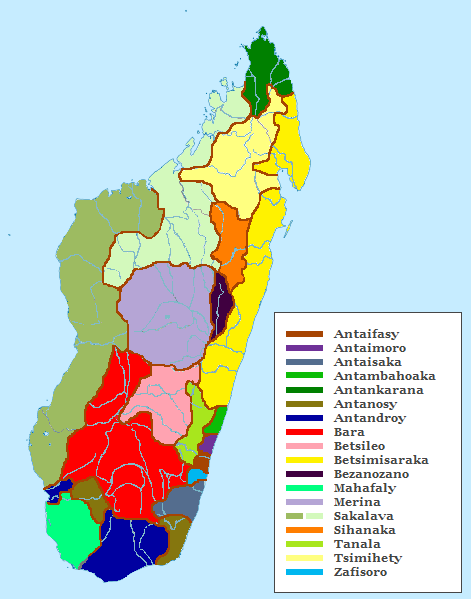
Traditional region of the Merina people (purple center), relative to other Malagasy ethnic groups

This influx of diverse people led to various Malagasy sub-ethnicities in the mid-2nd millennium. The Merina were probably the early arrivals, alongside the Betsileo, Merina, Bezanozano, Sihanaka and Tsimihety and are believed to originate from the aboriginal group named Vazimba about whom little is known. According to the island's oral traditions, the Merina people settled in the central highlands of Madagascar in the 15th century following wars and migrant pressure from the coast. They formed the Imerina kingdom which is one of the three major kingdoms on the island by the 18th century – the other two being Sakalava kingdom on the west-northwest and Betsimisaraka kingdom on the east-northeast.

These early Merina settlers industriously built vast irrigation projects that helped drain the plateau marshes, irrigate arable lands, and grow rice two times every year. They emerged as the politically dominant group and a wealthy kingdom towards the close of the 18th century. The capital of their kingdom remains the capital of contemporary Madagascar.

Oral history traces the emergence of a united kingdom in the central highlands of Madagascar – a region called Imerina – back to early 16th-century king Andriamanelo. Early Merina was subject to slave raiding by neighbor Sakalava and Bezanozano. The 18th-century Merina civil wars supplied the Mascarene and Arabic slave market with many Merina individuals. By 1824, a succession of Merina kings had conquered nearly all of Madagascar, particularly through the military strategy, ambitious treaties and political policies of Andrianampoinimerina (circa 1785–1810) and his son Radama I (1792–1828). The colonial British empire recognized the sovereignty of the Merina kingdom and its control of the Madagascar island in 1817. Radama I welcomed European traders and allowed Christian missionaries to establish missions on Madagascar. After him, the Merina people were ruled by Queen Ranavalona I ruled from 1828 to 1861, Queen Rasoherina from 1863 to 1868, and Queen Ranavalona II ruled from 1868 to 1885.

Swahili Arab traders expanded their opportunities to trade and European colonial powers such as the French trader Joseph-François Lambert signed a disputed lease with King Radama II for plantation lands for sugarcane cultivation and industries along the Madagascar coastal plains. These operations and plantations were worked by the forced labor of imported slaves. The largest influx of slaves was brought in by the 'Umani Arabs and the French. The Makua people from Mozambique were one of the major victims of this demand, slave capture and export that attempted to satisfy this demand. The slavery was abolished by the French administration in 1896, which adversely impacted the fortunes of Merina and non-Merina operated slave-run plantations.

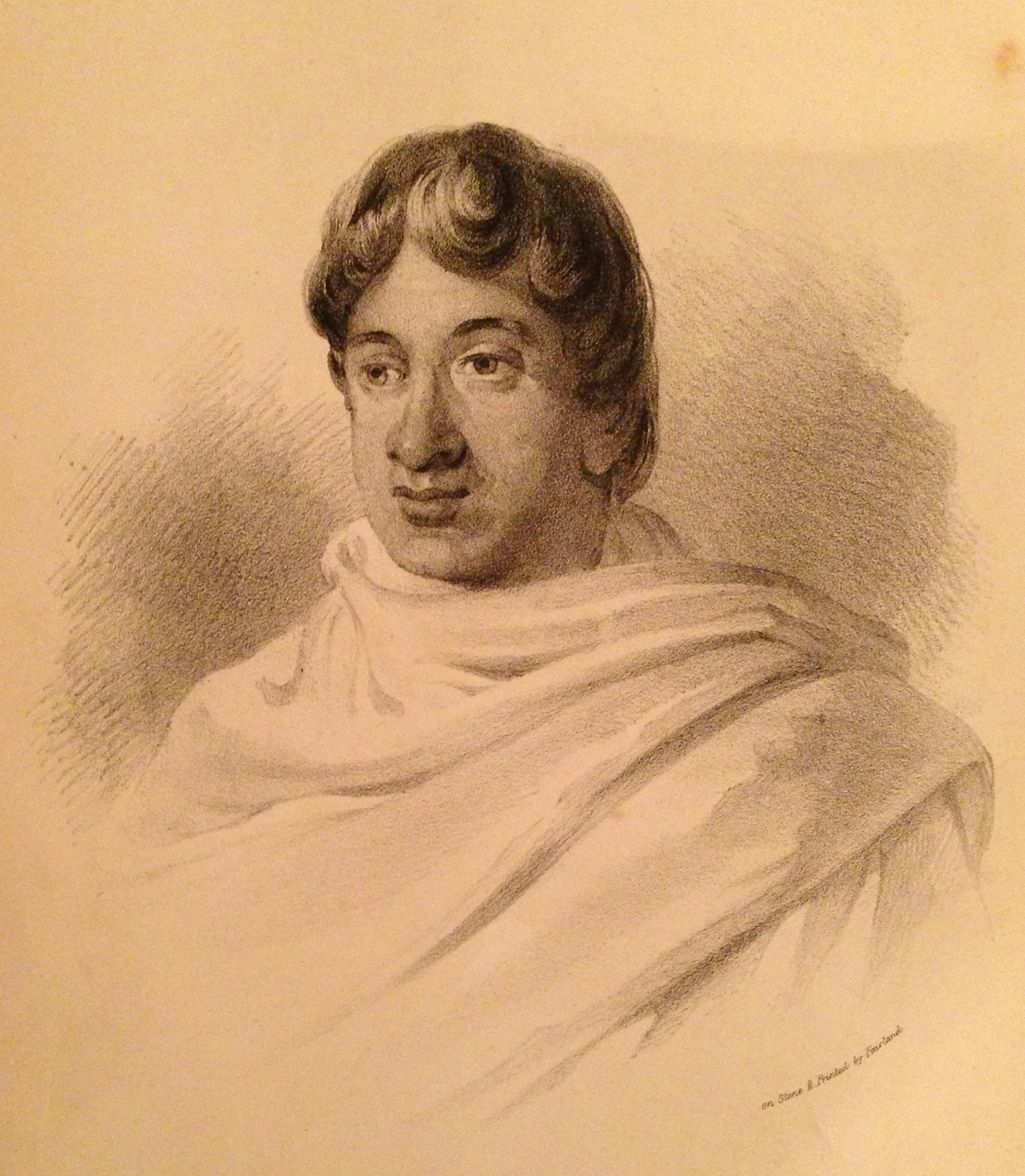
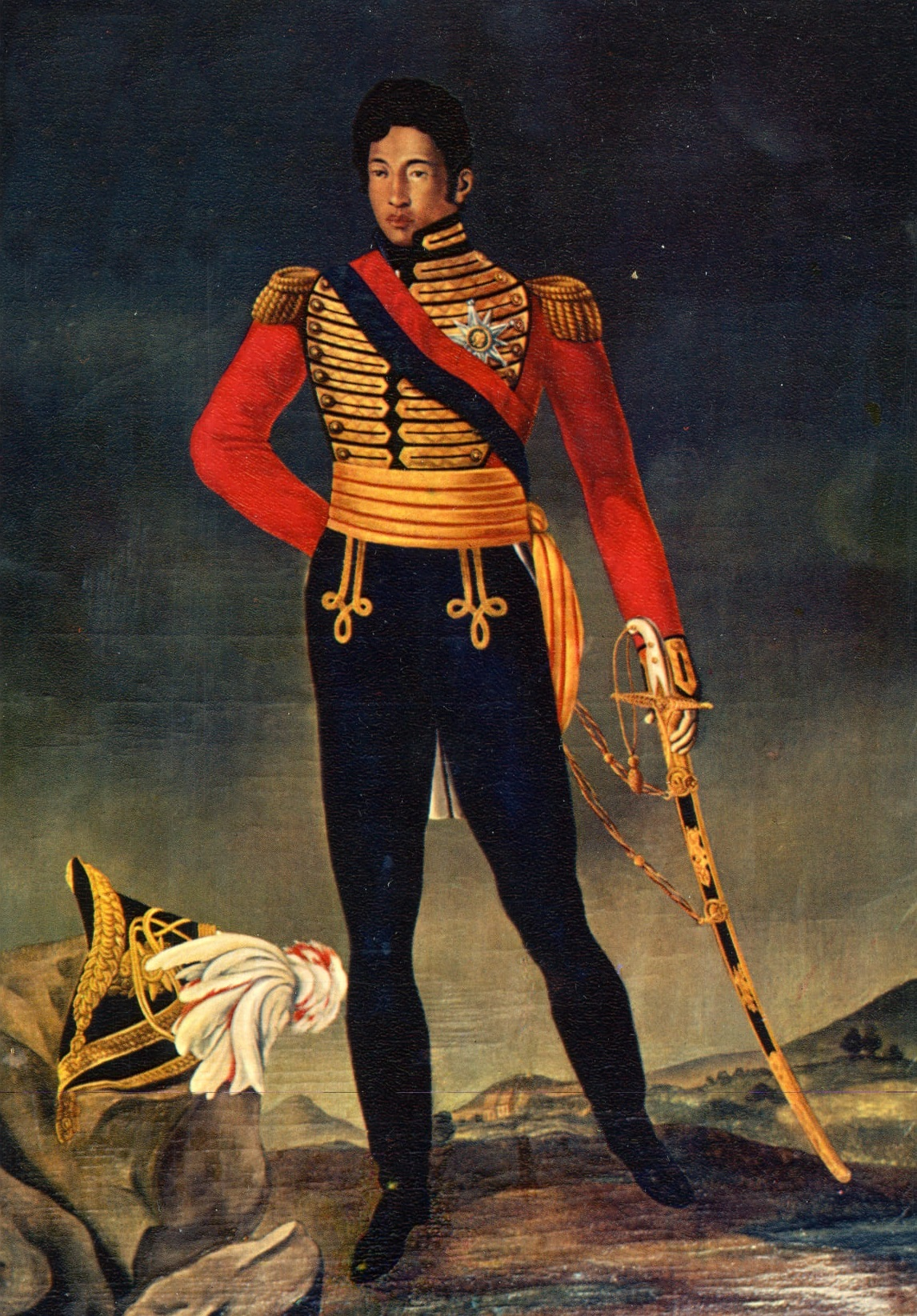
Two portraits of Radama I, the Merina king who unified Madagascar, then welcomed European traders and missionaries

The dominance of the Merina kingdom over all of Madagascar came to an end with the first Franco-Hova War of 1883 to 1885, triggered by the disputed lease signed by Radama II. At the war's end, Madagascar ceded Antsiranana (Diégo Suarez) on the northern coast to France and paid 560,000 gold francs to the heirs of Joseph-François Lambert, a Frenchman who had been promised lucrative trade privileges under King Radama II that had later been revoked. The French declared Madagascar as a protectorate in 1894, which the then Merina Queen refused to sign to. The Second Franco-Hova War followed in 1895, when the French military landed in Mahajanga (Majunga) and marched by way of the Betsiboka River to the capital, Antananarivo, taking the city's defenders by surprise. In 1896, the French annexed Madagascar, and in 1897 the Merina people became the residents of the colony of French Madagascar.

In early 20th century, the Merina people led an anti-French nationalist movement. A secret society dedicated to affirming Malagasy cultural identity was formed in 1913, calling itself Iron and Stone Network (in local language, Vy Vato Sakelika – VVS). The group, based in Antananarivo, was led by a Malagasy Protestant clergyman, Pastor Ravelojoana. Repressed at first with numerous arrests over 1915 and 1916, the movement re-emerged in the 1920s through communists who gained concessions by partnering with the French Left in France.

A famine in 1943–44 led to an open rebellion in Madagascar. The 1946 constitution of the French Fourth Republic made Madagascar a territoire d'outre-mer (overseas territory) within the French Union. Madagascar gained full independence in 1958 as the Malagasy Republic. The first president of the Republic was Philibert Tsiranana, a coastal Malagasy of Tsimihety ethnicity. While Tsiranana was able to consolidate power with a winner-takes-all system, the Merina nationalists faced competition from other ethnic groups. The communist Congress Party for the Independence of Madagascar weakened because of rifts between leftist and ultranationalist factions.

The Merina form much of the elite and educated middle-class of Madagascar. They are influential in the economy, universities and government organizations of Madagascar.

== Language ==
Flag of the Merina people (since 1997)

The Merina people speak the Malagasy language, also known as Highland Malagasy, which formed the official language and the basis for the different dialects across the country. Highland Malagasy is also widely spoken by the Betsileo, Bezanozano, Sihanaka, Vakinankaritra people and southeastern groups excluding the Antesaka people. Malagasy is one of two official languages alongside French in the 2010 constitution putting in place the Fourth Republic. Previously, under the 2007 constitution, English was one of three official languages alongside Malagasy and French.

Malagasy is the national language of Madagascar. An estimated 7.5 million people were fluent in this language in 2011, according to Ethnologue. It is written in Latin script, introduced by Christian missionaries. Malagasy is the language of instruction in all public schools through grade five for all subjects, and its use is optional for the subjects of history-geography, Philosophy and Malagasy language for the baccalaureate degree in high school.

== Religion ==
King Radama I welcomed Christian missionaries to establish missions on Madagascar in the 1810s. The Merina nobles were among the first to convert to Christianity. The London Missionary Society established numerous missions along the coast of Madagascar in the 1820s. Those who converted were offered scholarships in London and apprenticeship in Manchester.

Due to the influence of British missionaries, the Merina upper classes converted to Protestantism entirely in the mid-19th century, following the example of their queen, Ranavalona II. The early spread of Protestantism among the Merina elite resulted in a degree of class and ethnic differentiation among practitioners of Christianity. The French preferred Catholic interpreters and the former slaves of the Merina people converted to Catholicism. The ruling and noble class, however was Protestant. The nobility attempted to intervene, by expelling certain Christian missions. This dynamic ultimately created religious sect divisions in contemporary demographics.

== Society and culture ==
=== Social stratification ===
Among all the Malagasy ethnicities, the Merina historically have had a highly stratified caste system. The Merina people were divided into four strata throughout history: the Andriana (nobles), the Hova (freemen), the Mainty (vassals) and the Andevo (slaves) during the colonisation of Madagascar. The Mainty are wrongly confused with the Andevo who were slaves to the Hova and even to other Mainty, also known as Mainty telo reny. Pre-conquest Merina slaves and slaves from other parts of Madagascar were mostly captured during Ranavalona I's reign. In the ancient times, the fotsy-mainty dichotomy among Merina, translated as white-black, were not based on physiognomy, according to Karen Middleton, but whether they have a family tomb: fotsy have family tomb, mainty are those without one or those who have established a recent tomb. Today, Malagasy people commonly refer to the Merina people as fotsy, meaning Highland Malagasy people whose Andriana were buried within the sacred hills of the Imerina kingdom. On the other side, the Mainty, initially servants to the Andriana, are most commonly associated with the Sakalava people from the west coast of the island due to their seemingly African heritage.

Each strata had been then hierarchically subdivided. The Andriana are divided into six sub-strata, each had an inherited occupation, and were endogamous.

The nineteenth century records show that Andevo were both Malagasy and African slaves. They made about a third of the Merina population. Muslim and European merchants traded slaves within the Imerina kingdom and on the coast of Madagascar. In addition to the Andevo, nobles and freemen used East and Southeast African slaves for their own plantations between 1795 and 1895. Marriage and any sexual relations between the fotsy and mainty were taboo. According to a 2012 report by Gulnara Shahinian, the United Nations' Special Rapporteur on contemporary forms of slavery, the descendants of former slave castes continue to suffer in contemporary Merina society and cross-caste marriages are socially ostracized.

=== Ritual and folklore ===
The Vazimba feature prominently in Merina oral history and popular imagination. It has been speculated that the Vazimba were the original population of Madagascar, descended from Southeast Asian seafarers who may have had pygmy physical characteristics. Among some Malagasy, the Vazimba are not believed to be human at all, but rather a form of supernatural creature possessing magical powers (mahery).

In the first seven years of their lives, boys are typically circumcised in a ritual wherein relatives request the blessings and protection of the ancestors. The Merina people also ritually kill their cattle with unusual violence, cook and consume beef prepared thereafter ceremoniously.

The Merina believe their land to be tanin'drazana (the land of the ancestors) and show reverence to their ancestors by burying them in family tombs typically located in the ancestral village of origin. Many believe that ancestors can intervene in events on Earth, for good or for ill, and this belief shapes the actions and thoughts of many Malagasy.

=== Cuisine ===
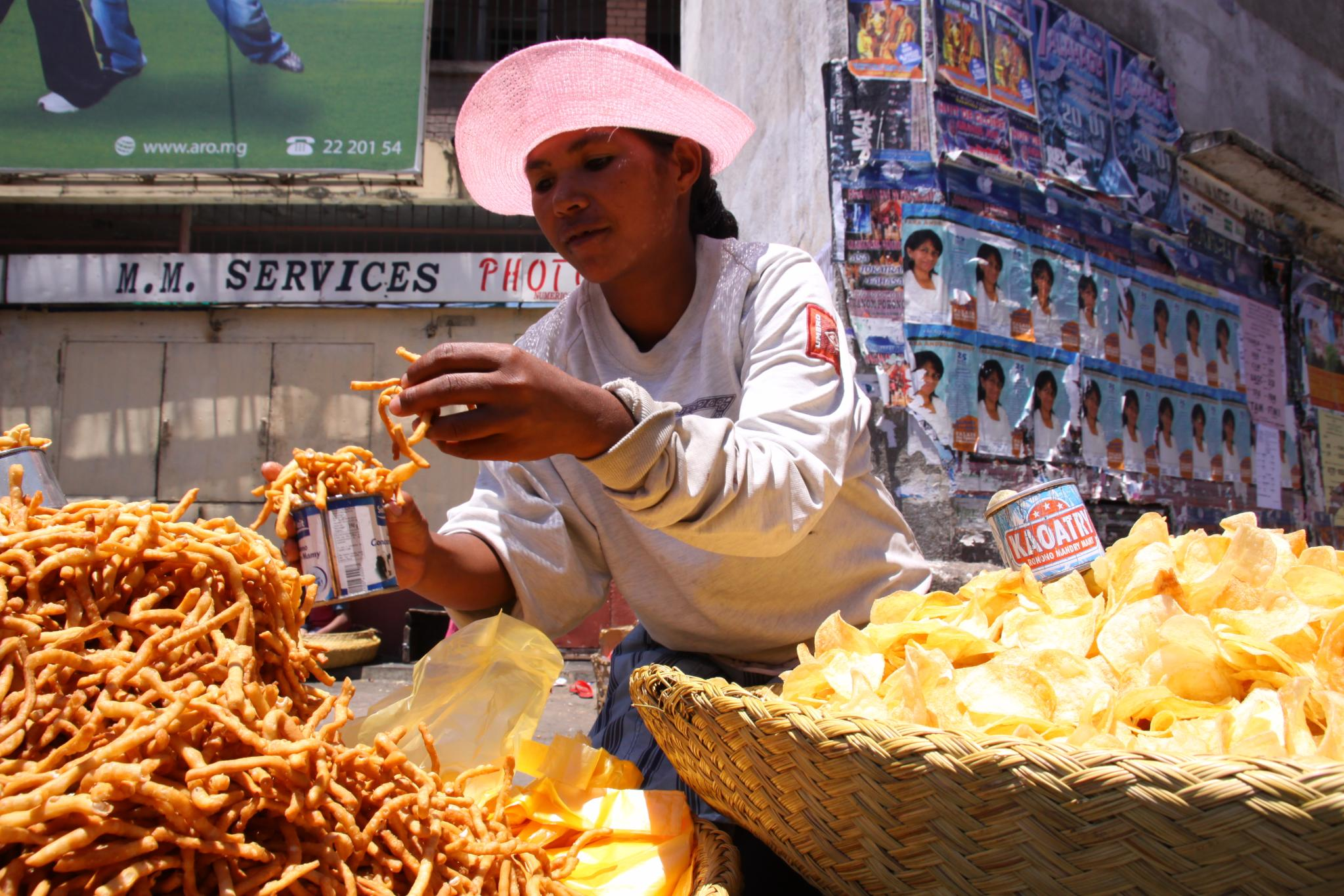
A Merina woman selling Kakapizon (left, a fried snack) and chips in Antananarivo

The cuisine of the Merina is so heavily dominated by rice that the term for eating a meal is simply "to eat rice". This staple of the diet is so central to the Merina that it is considered to be masina, or holy, and a common Merina belief holds that the eating of rice is the key to moral behaviour, and the French who occupied Merina lands were often looked down upon for eating bread over rice. Beef also plays a large part in the Merina diet, and according to Merina oral history, it was a servant of King Ralambo who discovered that cows were edible and shared this knowledge with the king, who in turn informed the rest of his kingdom.

=== Livelihoods ===
Rice, cassava and potatoes are staple crops of the Merina people. They also grow onions and other supplements, while cattle, pigs and animal husbandry is also a significant occupation. Many Merina people have moved into urban areas, where they operate factories and run businesses.

== See also ==
- Malagasy people
- Merina Kingdom

== Bibliography ==
- Bradt, Hilary; Austin, Daniel (2007). Madagascar (9th ed.). Guilford, CT: The Globe Pequot Press Inc. pp. 113–115. ISBN 978-1-84162-197-5.
- Ogot, Bethwell A. (1992). Africa from the Sixteenth to the Eighteenth Century. Paris: UNESCO. ISBN 9789231017117.
