= List of roads in Madagascar =

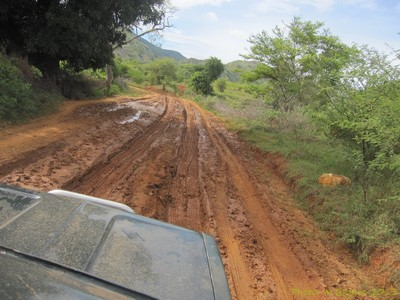
Dirt portion of RN5 in Madagascar

This is a list of both the National roads and the provincial roads in Madagascar. Many are unpaved dirt roads, or insufficiently maintained. Only 6,000 km out off a total of 32,000 km are paved and mostly in a bad state of conversation.

In 1983, Irish author Dervla Murphy described the condition of the roads in Madagascar at the time:

Of the country's 22,800 miles of so-called 'motor' roads only ten per cent are tarred and only twenty-eight per cent permanently usable; the rest are washed away annually during the rains; and even the tarred stretches tend to be of uncertain temper.

== National roads ==
| Number | length :0 | | Runs through | Condition |
| Number | km | mi | Runs through | Condition |
|---|---|---|---|---|
| RN1 | 234 | 145 | Antananarivo - Miarinarivo - Tsiroanomandidy - Belobaka | Antananarivo-Tsiroanomandidy is paved |
| RN1a | 481 | 299 | Analavory - Ihazomay - Tsiroanomandidy - Beravina – Bemahatazana - Maintirano | unpaved, very bad state of conservation |
| RN1b | 94 | 58 | Analavory - Babetville - Tsiroanomandidy | unpaved |
| RN2 | 352 | 219 | Antananarivo - Manjakandriana - Moramanga – Ampasimanolotra - Toamasina | paved |
| RN3 | 91 | 57 | Antananarivo - Talata Volonondry - Anjozorobe - Lake Alaotra | paved |
| RN3a | 180 | 110 | Lake Alaotra - Andilamena | paved, good condition |
| RN3b | 106 | 66 | Sambava - Andapa | paved, good condition |
| RN4 | 570 | 350 | Antananarivo - Ankazobe – Maevatanana – Ambondromamy - Mahajanga | paved |
| RN5 | 402 | 250 | Toamasina - Fenoarivo Atsinanana - Soanierana Ivongo - Mananara Avaratra - Maroantsetra | first 160 km (99 mi) paved, remaining: unpaved in bad condition |
| RN5a | 406 | 252 | Ambilobe - Antalaha | paved between Ambilobe - Iharana in 2021. remaining paved, in good condition |
| RN6 | 713 | 443 | Antsiranana - Ambilobe - Ambanja - Antsohihy - Boriziny Vaovao - Mampikony - Ambondromamy | paved |
| RN7 | 925 | 575 | Antananarivo - Ambatolampy - Antsirabe – Ambositra – Ambohimahasoa - Fianarantsoa – Ambalavao - Ihosy - Sakaraha - Toliara | paved, good condition |
| RN8 | 198 | 123 | Morondava - Belo Amoron'i Tsiribihina - Bekopaka | unpaved |
| RN8a | 119 | 74 | Maintirano - Antsalova | - |
| RN8b | 145 | 90 | RN4 - Marovoay - Ambolomoty - Maroala - Bekipay - Mitsinjo | - |
| RN8c | 318 | 198 | Antabilao ( junction RN 4)- Kandreho - Ambatomainty - Morafenobe - Bemahatazana | - |
| RN9 | 382 | 237 | Toliara (Tulear) - Befandriana Atsimo - Manja - Mandabe | entirely paved |
| RN10 | 512 | 318 | Andranovory ( junction RN 7)- Beloha - Tsiombe - Ambovombe (junction RN 13) | unpaved |
| RN11 | 103 | 64 | Mananjary - Nosy Varika | unpaved, bad condition |
| RN11a | 125 | 78 | junction RN2 – Vatomandry Ilaka Atsinanana - Mahanoro | partly paved |
| RN12 | 300 | 190 | Irondro – Manakara - Farafangana - Vangaindrano | paved, partly in bad condition |
| RN12a | 256 | 159 | Tolganaro (Fort Dauphin) - Manantenina - Vangaindrano | first 45 km are paved (Tolagnaro-Ebakiky), remaining unpaved, bad condition |
| RN13 | 493 | 306 | Ihosy - Ambovombe - Tolagnaro (Fort Dauphin) | unpaved between Ihosy - Ambovombe, repaved in June 2026 between Ambovombe - Tolagnaro (Fort Dauphin) |
| RN T14 | 94 | 58 | Ifanadiana (RN25)- Ikongo - Vohitrindry (RN12) | unpaved |
| RN T15 | 232 | 144 | Beroroha - Ankazoabo - Sakaraha (N7)- Beroroha | unpaved |
| RN T16 | 81 | 50 | Ranotsara Avaratra (RN27)- Iakora | unpaved |
| RN T17 | 41 | 25 | Manankoliva (RN13)- Bekily | unpaved |
| RN T17 A | 114 | | crossing with RN 10 - Benenitra - Bezaha | unpaved |
| RN T18 | 130 | 81 | Vangaindrano - 42 km (26 mi) - Ranomena - Nosifeno (Midongy Atsimo) - 94 km (58 mi) - Midongy Atsimo National Park - Befotaka | unpaved |
| RN T19 | 523 | 325 | Katsepy – Mitsinjo - Namakia - 68 km (42 mi) - Soalala - Besalampy - Maintirano | unpaved |
| RN T20 | 49 | 30 | Ilaka Atsinanana (intersection RN11a) - Antanambao Manampontsy | |
| RN T21 | 61 | 38 | Ambodiatafa - Ifotatra- Loukintsy - Ambodifotatra - Aniribe (Ile Sainte Marie) | paved, in 2025. |
| RN22 | 55 | 34 | Fenoarivo Atsinanana - Vavatenina - | mostly paved - Anjahambe |
| RN23 | 132 | 82 | Mahanoro - Betsizaraina - Beanana - Ambinanindrano - Marolambo | |
| RN23a | 71 | 44 | Moramanga (intersection with RN2) - Anosibe An'ala | unpaved |
| RN24 | 42 | 26 | Mananjary - Vohilava, Mananjary (intersection with RN11) | unpaved |
| RN25 | 176 | 109 | Ambohimahasoa – Irondro - Mananjary | partly paved, partly unpaved in bad condition |
| RN26 | 3 | 1.9 | intersection RN7 (Ilempona) - Antanifotsy | paved |
| RN27 | 275 | 171 | Ihosy - Ivohibe - Farafangana | largely unpaved |
| RN30 | 23 | 14 | intersection RN 6 - Ambalavelona - Ankify (Diana) | |
| RN30a | 30 | 19 | intersection RN 57 (Hellville) - Andilana | |
| RN31 | 260 | 160 | Antsohihy - Bealanana - Ambatoria - Ambalapaiso - Andapa | mostly paved up to Bealanana |
| RN31a | 79 | 49 | Ankerika (intersection with RN6)- Analalava | |
| RN32 | 186 | 116 | Antsohihy - Befandriana Avaratra -Mandritsara | most part unpaved |
| RN33 | 340 | 210 | Ambatondrazaka - Ambondromamy | unpaved |
| RNT 33A | 82 | 51 | National Road 4 - Bekapaina - Tsaratanana | unpaved |
| RNT 33B | 23 | 14 | National Road 4 - Andranofasika - Ambato-Boeni | unpaved |
| RN34 | 368 | 229 | Antsirabe – Miandrivazo - Malaimbandy | Antsirabe – Miandrivazo: paved; Miandrivazo - Malaimbandy: paved, good condition |
| RN35 | 286 | 178 | Ambositra – Malaimbandy - Morondava | paved, refurnished in 2012 |
| RN36 | 209 | 130 | intersection RN 4 - Miantso - Maritampona- Fenoarivo Afovoany - Manakambahiny | |
| RN41 | 41 | 25 | Ambositra - Fandriana | |
| RN42 | 94 | 58 | Fianarantsoa - Ikalamavony | |
| RN43 | 133 | 83 | Analavory – Ampefy – Soavinandriana – Ambohibary - Sambaina | paved |
| RN44 | 228 | 142 | Moramanga - Ambatondrazaka - Imerimandroso - Amboavory | partly paved, renovation is previewed for 2022. Between Marovoay and Amboasary Gara has been refurbished. |
| RN45 | 25 | 16 | Alakamisy Ambohimaha (intersection N7) – Anjamba – Vorondolo - (intersection with RN 25) | paved |
| RN46 | 17 | 11 | Soamandroso (intersection N7) - Ambovombe Afovoany (Ambovombe Centre) | |
| RN53 | 13 | 8.1 | Antalaha – Antsirabato Airport, Ambohitralanana (Sava region) | |
| RN54 | 8 | 5.0 | (ex-Bonnet & Fils, Mahajunga) - Mahajunga airport | paved (refurbished in 2022= |
| RN55 | 78 | 48 | intersection RN 9 - Morombe | unpaved |
| RN56 | 2.7 | 1.7 | intersection Antananarivo | paved |
| RN57 | 11 | 6.8 | Nosy Be - Fascene Airport | paved |
| RN58a | 16 | 9.9 | Antananarivo | paved |
| RN59a | 4 | 2.5 | Androrona - port of Vohemar (Sava region) | paved |
| RN59b | 19 | 12 | Antsiranana - Ramena | paved |
| RN 60 | 15 | | junction between RN 2 and RN 7 in the south of Antananarivo | |
| RN63 (secondaire) | 2.6 | 1.6 | Antananarivo (Ankadievo) - RN7 at Antananarivo, Ankadimbahoaka | paved |
| RN 65 | 9.4 | | junction between RN 2, RN 3 and the industriel zone of Ankorondrano | paved |

== Route Provinciale (Provincial roads) ==
| Number | Length | | Runs through | Condition |
| Number | km | | Runs through | Condition |
|---|---|---|---|---|
| RIP3A | | | Route d'interet Provinciale 3A - Andondabe-Foulpointe, intersection with RN 5 (Atsinanana) | unpaved |
| RIP3F | 60 | | Route d'interet Provinciale 3F - Ambositra, intersection with RN 7 - Ambinanindrano (Amoron'i Mania) | unpaved, bad state of conversation |
| RIP5 | | | RIP5 - route d'interet provincial 5, in Analamanga to Masindray | paved |
| RIP7 | | | RIP7 - route d'interet provincial 7 in Toamasina suburbaine to West, Nosibe to Ivoloina | paved, but in bad state of conservation |
| RIP12A | | | Route d'interet Provinciale 12A - Ampasimbe-Foulpointe, intersection with RN 5 (Atsinanana) | unpaved |
| RIP13 | 24 km | | RIP13 - route d'interet provincial 13 Ambanja – Bemanevika – Marotolana - Ankify (Diana Region) | paved up to Marotolana |
| RIP19 | 70 | 43 | RIP19 - route d'interet provincial 19 Talata Volonondry - Ambatomanoina (Analamanga) | unpaved |
| RIP20D | | | RIP20D - route d'interet provincial 20D Antsohimbondrona to Ambilobe (Diana) | unpaved |
| RIP23 | 72 | 45 | RIP23 - route d'interet provincial 23 Anosibe An'ala - Moramanga (Alaotra-Mangoro) | unpaved (This will be the future RN 23. In 100 years or two) |
| RIP26 | | | Route d'interet Provinciale 26 - intersection with RN 3 - Ambohitseheno (Analamanga) | unpaved |
| RIP29 | | | Route d'interet Provinciale 29 - intersection with RN 4, forking at the Ikopa River bridge (Analamanga) to Antsahalava, Ampangabe (29 km). | unpaved |
| RIP51 | | | Route d'interet Provinciale 51 - intersection with RN 3 - Ambohimanga Rova (Analamanga) | ?? |
| RIP71 | 44 | | Imerintsiatosika (RN 1)- Miantsoarivo, Miandrandra, Ambohimandry and Ambohipandrano - Behenjy (RN 7) (Itasy) | Mostly unpaved, partly paved |
| RIP73 | 12 | | Ambatolampy - Tsiafajavona Ankaratra | unpaved, in good state |
| RIP74 | | | Befotaka - Vangaindrano | unpaved |
| RIP83 | 18 | | Ambatofolaka - Mandiavato (Itasy) | unpaved |
| RIP84 | 45 | | Arivonimamo - Manalalondo (Itasy) | unpaved |
| RIP85 | 65 | | Ambohimasina - Ambohitrambo - Arivonimamo (Itasy) | unpaved, bad state of conservation |
| RIP88 | 10 | | Ambatomiravavy - Fenomanana (Itasy) | unpaved |
| RIP92 | 19 | | Miarinarivo - Manazary (Itasy) | unpaved |
| RIP93 | 19 | | Analavory - Anosibe-Ifanja (Itasy) | unpaved |
| RIP94 | 55 | | Miarinarivo - Ambatomanjaka to Fiavahana (Itasy) | unpaved |
| RIP95 | 31 | | Tranovy (RN1) Zoma Bealoka - Soavimbazaha (Itasy) | unpaved |
| RIP103 | | | RIP103 - route d'interet provincial 103 Soavinandriana- 13 km - Mananasy - Mahavelona, Soavinandriana (Itasy) | unpaved |
| RIP107 | | | RIP107 - route d'interet provincial 107 Tsivory (Sofia) - Ambatoriha (Sofia region) | unpaved |
| RIP111 | 61 | | RIP111 - route d'interet provincial 111 Antanifotsy - Soanindrariny - Tsarahonenana Sahanivotry (Vakinankaratra) | unpaved |
| RIP112 | 76 | | RIP112 - route d'interet provincial 112 Maintirano - Besalampy -Mahatsinjo, Maevatanana | unpaved |
| RIP112M | 34 | - | RIP112M - route d'interet provincial 112M Maintirano - Antsalanjy | unpaved |
| RIP114 | | | RIP114 - route d'interet provincial 114 Tambohorano - to the RIP112 | unpaved |
| RIP116 | | | RIP116 - route d'interet provincial 116 Maroala - Mandritsara (Sofia region) | unpaved |
| RIP117M | 32 | | RIP117M - route d'interet provincial 117M Bealanana - Amboasary (Sofia region) | unpaved |
| RIP117 | | | RIP117 - route d'interet provincial 117 Tsivory - Marotsiraka (Anosy) | unpaved |
| RIP118 | 80.15 | | RIP118 - route d'interet provincial 118 Soanierana - Enakara-Haut - Bevoay (Anosy) | unpaved |
| RIP122 | | | RIP122 - route d'interet provincial 122 Antsirabe- Soanindrariny | (route de la pomme) |
| RIP123 | 27 | | RIP123 - route d'interet provincial 123 Tsarahonenana Sahanivotry - Antanambao, Antsirabe II (Vakinankaratra) | unpaved |
| RIP202D | 31.4 | | RIP202D - route d'interet provincial 202D Nosiarina, Bemanevika, Tanambao Daoud (Sava region) | ?? |

== Toll roads ==
- Autoroute Antananarivo–Toamasina (under construction since December 2022)

== See also ==
- Driving in Madagascar
