= Ivohibe District =

- District
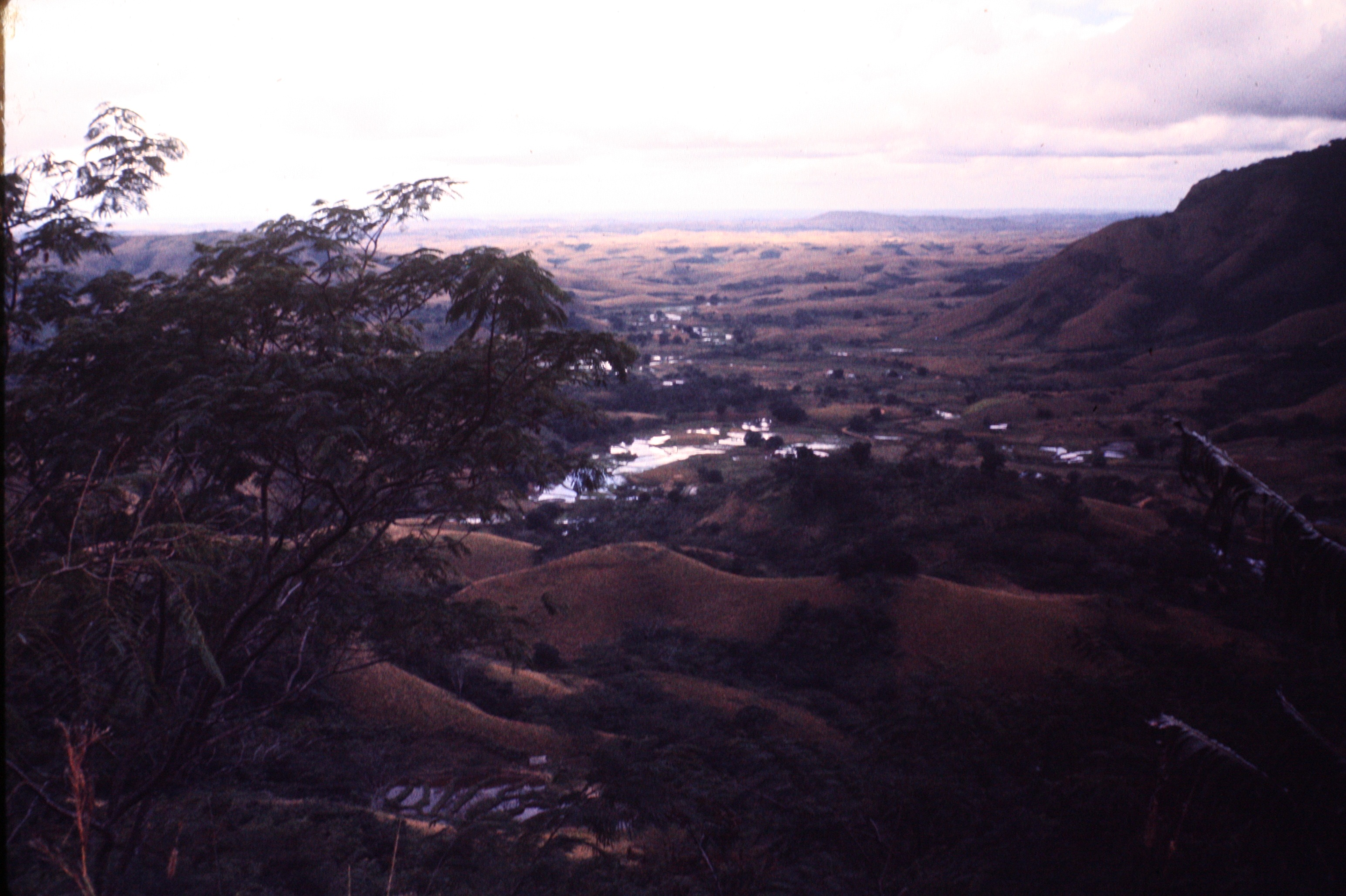

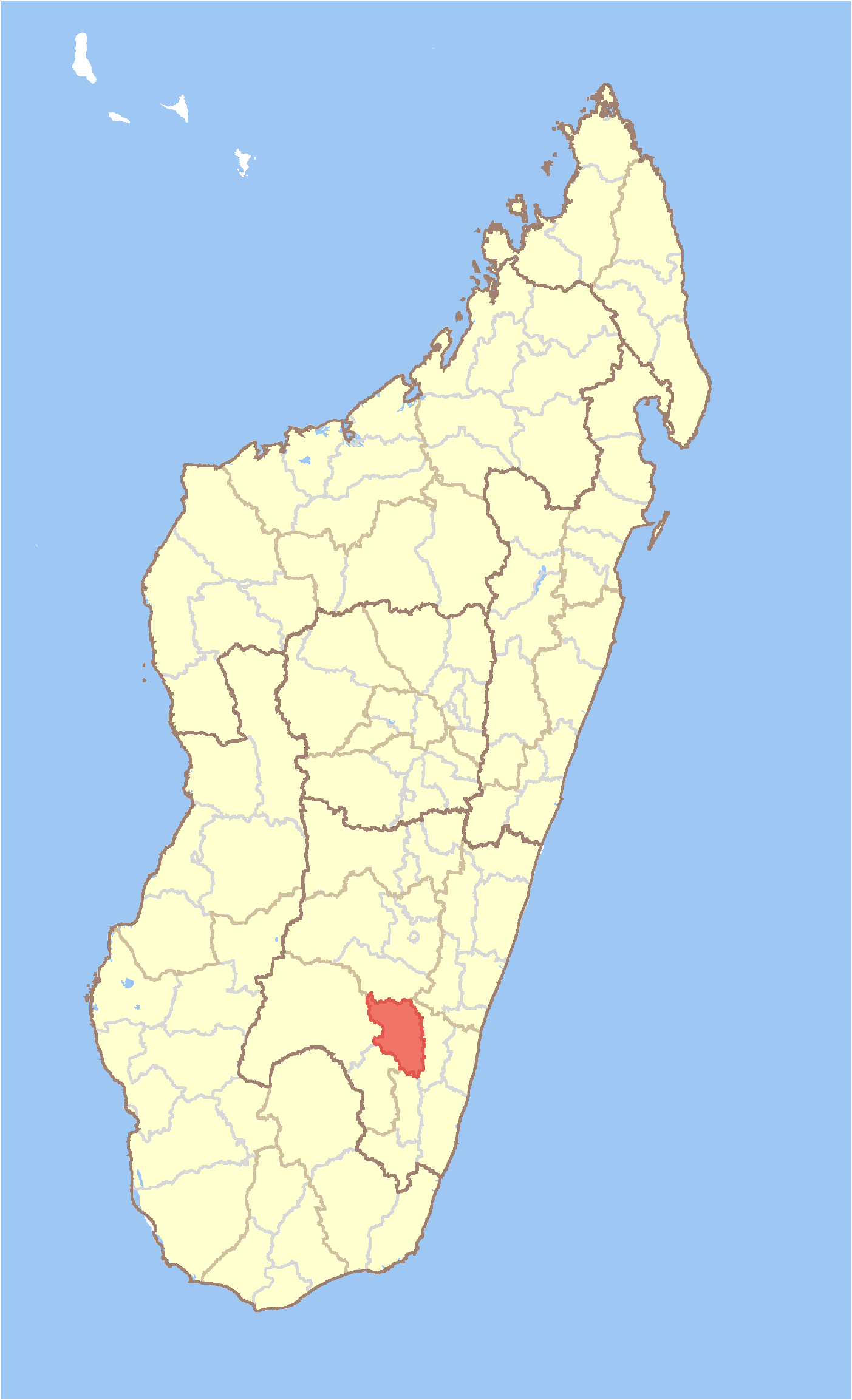
- Location in Madagascar
- Coordinates: 22°21′S 45°49′E
- Country: Madagascar
- Region: Ihorombe

Area
  - Total: 4,119 km^{2} (1,590 sq mi)

Population (2018)
  - Total: 55,380
  - Density: 8.3/km^{2} (21/sq mi)
- Time zone: UTC3 (EAT)
- Postal code: 315

Ivohibe is a district in south-eastern Madagascar. It is a part of Ihorombe Region and borders the districts of Ambalavao in north, Vondrozo in east, Midongy Atsimo in south, Iakora in southwest and Ihosy in west. The area is 4,119 km^{2} (1,590 sq mi) and the population was estimated to be 34,289 in 2001.

== Communes ==
The district is further divided into six communes:

- Antambohobe
- Ivongo
- Ivohibe
- Maropaika
- Antaramena
- Kotipa

It is connected with Ihosy in the west, and Farafangana in the east by the largely unpaved Route nationale 27.

== Protected areas ==
- Part of the Ambositra-Vondrozo Forest Corridor, a protected harmonious landscape
- Part of Andringitra National Park
- Pic d'Ivohibe special reserve
- Ivohiboro protected area.
