= Manjakatompo =

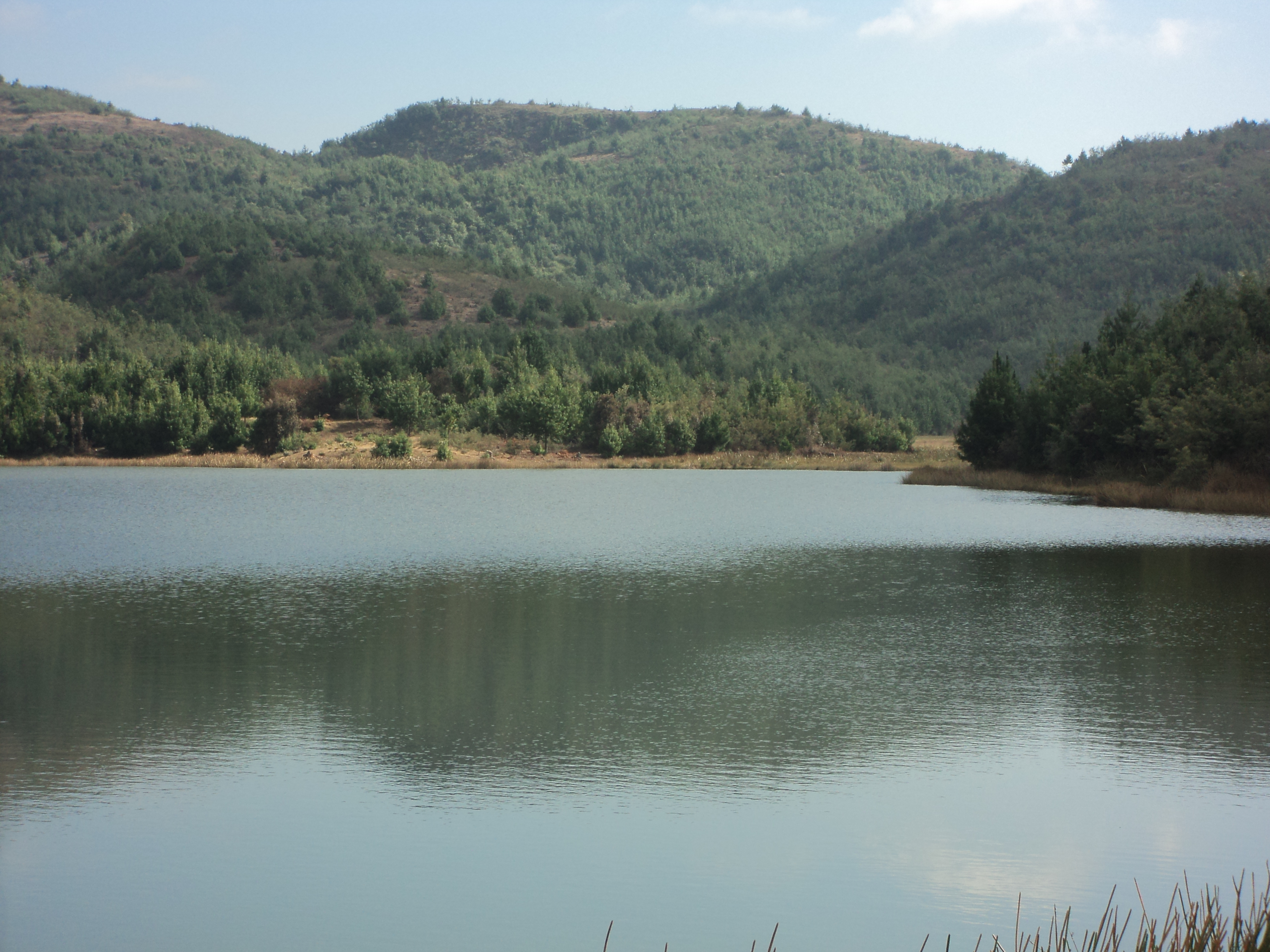
- Lake of Manjakatompo

- Location in Madagascar
- Coordinates: 19°20′S 47°26′E
- Country: Madagascar
- Region: Vakinankaratra
- District: Ambatolampy
- Elevation: 1,552 m (5,092 ft)

Population (2001)
  - Total: 6,000
- Time zone: UTC3 (EAT)

Manjakatompo is a town and commune in Madagascar. It belongs to the district of Ambatolampy, which is a part of Vakinankaratra Region. The population of the commune was estimated to be approximately 6,000 in 2001 commune census.

The town is situated near the Ankaratra massif and the third highest peak of Madagascar, Mount Tsiafajavona (2643 meters).

There is a forest station near the town covering 8320 ha.
