= Ivongo =

- Location in Madagascar
- Coordinates: 22°30′S 47°2′E
- Country: Madagascar
- Region: Ihorombe
- District: Ivohibe
- Elevation: 599 m (1,965 ft)

Population (2001)
  - Total: 5,000
- Time zone: UTC3 (EAT)

Ivongo is a town and commune in Madagascar. It belongs to the district of Ivohibe, which is a part of Ihorombe Region. The population of the commune was estimated to be approximately 5,000 in 2001 commune census.

Ivongo has a riverine harbour. Only primary schooling is available. Farming and raising livestock provides employment for 49.9% and 49.9% of the working population. The most important crop is rice, while other important products are bananas, sugarcane and cassava. Services provide employment for 0.2% of the population.

It is connected with Ihosy in the west, and Farafangana in the east by the largely unpaved Route nationale 27.

== See also ==
Pic d'Ivohibe Reserve and the Andringitra National Park that are nearby
