= Antambohobe =

- Location in Madagascar
- Coordinates: 22°18′S 46°46′E
- Country: Madagascar
- Region: Ihorombe
- District: Ivohibe
- Elevation: 755 m (2,477 ft)

Population (2001)
  - Total: 9,000
- Time zone: UTC+3 (EAT)

Antambohobe is a town and commune in Madagascar. It belongs to the district of Ivohibe, which is a part of Ihorombe Region. The population of the commune was estimated to be approximately 9,000 in the 2001 commune census.

Only primary schooling is available. Most of the inhabitants (75%) receive their support from agriculture; 24.4% of the inhabitants receive their support from raising livestock. Fishing supports 0.4% of the population; services provide employment for the remainder (0.2%). The most important crop is rice; other significant products are sugarcane, beans, maize and cassava.

It is connected with Ihosy in the west, and Farafangana in the east by the largely unpaved Route nationale 27.

== See also ==
Pic d'Ivohibe Reserve and the Andringitra National Park that are nearby
