= Andriantsivalana =

- Location in Madagascar
- Country: Madagascar
- Region: Vakinankaratra
- District: Ambatolampy

Population (2018)
  - Total: 24,247
- Time zone: UTC3 (EAT)

Andriantsivalana is a rural commune in Madagascar. It belongs to the district of Ambatolampy, which is a part of Vakinankaratra region. The population of the commune was 24,247 in 2018.

Primary and junior level secondary education are available in town. The majority 96% of the population of the commune are farmers, while an additional 1% receives their livelihood from raising livestock. The most important crop is rice, while other important products are beans, maize and sweet potatoes. Industry and services provide employment for 1% and 2% of the population, respectively.
