= Cyriaque Alexandre Rambolazafy =

Malagasy politician

Cyriaque Alexandre Rambolazafy is a Malagasy politician. He was a member of the National Assembly of Madagascar, he was elected in the 2002 Malagasy parliamentary election for the TIM - Tiako I Madagasikara party of Marc Ravalomanana and was reelected in 2007 as an Independent politician. He represents the constituency of Ivohibe.
