= Soanindrariny =

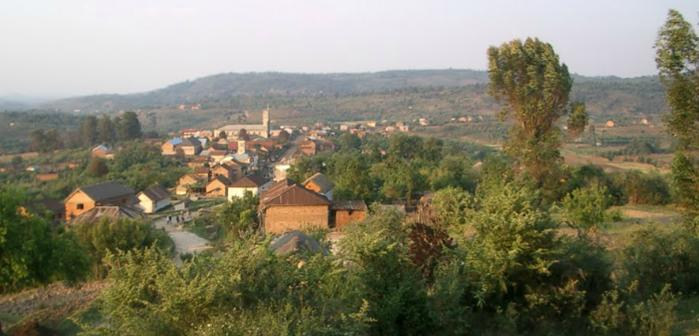
- Soanindrariny

- Location in Madagascar
- Coordinates: 19°54′S 47°14′E
- Country: Madagascar
- Region: Vakinankaratra
- District: Antsirabe II

Area
  - Total: 258 km^{2} (100 sq mi)
- Elevation: 1,788 m (5,866 ft)

Population (2001)
  - Total: 21,000
  - Ethnicities: Merina
- Time zone: UTC3 (EAT)

Soanindrariny is a rural municipality in Madagascar. It belongs to the district of Antsirabe II, which is a part of Vakinankaratra Region. The population of the commune was estimated to be approximately 21,000 in the 2001 commune census. Soanindrany is located approximately 29 km east of the capital of Antsirabe and covers an area of 258 km2.

Primary and junior level secondary education are available in town. The majority 95% of the population of the commune are farmers, while an additional 5% receives their livelihood from raising livestock. The most important crops are rice and fruits, while other important agricultural products are maize and potatoes.

== Roads ==
Soanindrariny is situated at 22 km east of Antsirabe with which it is connected by an unpaved Provincial road 122, and to the north to Antanifotsy by the Provincial road 111.

== Electricity ==
The JIRAMA electricity networks are not yet available in the municipality.
