= Boophis blommersae =

Conservation status
- Vulnerable (IUCN 3.1)

Scientific classification
- Kingdom: Animalia
- Phylum: Chordata
- Class: Amphibia
- Order: Anura
- Family: Mantellidae
- Genus: Boophis
- Species: B. blommersae

Binomial name
- Boophis blommersae Glaw and Vences, 1994

Species of frog

Boophis blommersae is a species of frog in the family Mantellidae. It is endemic to northern Madagascar and is known from two locations, Montagne d'Ambre and the vicinity of Tsaratanana. There is also a recent from near Bemanevika. The specific name blommersae honours Rose Marie Antoinette Blommers-Schlösser, a Dutch herpetologist and entomologist.

== Description ==
Adult males measure 24–27 mm (0.9–1.1 in) in snout–vent length. The fingers have some webbing while the toes are more extensively webbed. Skin is dorsally smooth. Dorsal colouration is highly variable: uniformly light brown, brown with a large dark hourglass pattern, or brown with lichen-like yellow or pink spots. The throat is transparent with a green shade, while the belly is centrally silvery white and laterally transparent. The iris is light brown to grey, with some reddish-brown colour and greenish yellow periphery. The legs have rather indistinct dark crossbands. The finger and the toe tips are greenish.

== Habitat and conservation ==
Boophis blommersae occurs in humid rainforest at elevations of 379–1,780 m (1,243–5,840 ft) above sea level. The tadpoles develop in streams. It is a very common species but tolerates only slight habitat modification — it is threatened by habitat loss caused by subsistence agriculture, timber extraction, charcoal manufacture, the spread of eucalyptus, and expanding human settlements. However, it occurs in the well-managed Montagne d'Ambre National Park and the Tsaratanana Reserve, and in the planned Bemanevika protected area.
