= Maropaika =

- Location in Madagascar
- Coordinates: 22°42′S 46°59′E
- Country: Madagascar
- Region: Ihorombe
- District: Ivohibe
- Elevation: 603 m (1,978 ft)

Population (2001)
  - Total: 9,000
- Time zone: UTC3 (EAT)

Maropaika is a town and commune in Madagascar. It belongs to the district of Ivohibe, which is a part of Ihorombe Region. The population of the commune was estimated to be approximately 9,000 in 2001 commune census.

Maropaika has a riverine harbour. Primary and junior level secondary education are available in town. The majority 56% of the population of the commune are farmers, while an additional 40% receive their livelihood from raising livestock. The most important crop is rice; other important products are peanuts, beans, and cassava. Services provide employment for 1% of the population. Additionally, fishing employs 3% of the population.

It is connected with Ihosy in the west, and Farafangana in the east by the largely unpaved Route nationale 27.
