= Antanimasaka =

Antanimasaka may refer to either of the two communes in Madagascar:

- Antanimasaka, Ambatolampy in Ambatolampy District, Vakinankaratra
- Antanimasaka, Marovoay in Marovoay District, Boeny
