= Ambalaomby =

- Location within Madagascar
- Coordinates: 19°44′S 47°58′E
- Country: Madagascar
- Region: Alaotra-Mangoro
- District: Anosibe An'ala

Area
  - Land: 290 km^{2} (110 sq mi)

Population ((2019, projection))
  - Total: 4,783
  - Density: 16/km^{2} (43/sq mi)
- Postal code: 506

Ambalaomby is a rural municipality in Anosibe An'ala District, Alaotra-Mangoro Region, Madagascar.

== Rivers ==
The Onive River is present in this area.
