= Ambatoharanana, Anosibe An'ala =

Ambatoharanana
- Location within Madagascar
- Coordinates: 19°44′S 47°58′E
- Country: Madagascar
- Region: Alaotra-Mangoro
- District: Anosibe An'ala
- Postal code: 506

Ambatoharanana, Anosibe An'ala is a rural municipality in Anosibe An'ala District, Alaotra-Mangoro Region, Madagascar.
