= Belambo, Ambatolampy =

Belambo
- Location in Madagascar
- Coordinates: 19°24′S 47°31′E
- Country: Madagascar
- Region: Vakinankaratra
- District: Ambatolampy
- Elevation: 1,571 m (5,154 ft)

Population (2001)
  - Total: 14,000
  - Ethnicities: Merina
- Time zone: UTC3 (EAT)

Belambo is a town and commune in Madagascar. It belongs to the district of Ambatolampy, which is a part of Vakinankaratra Region. The population of the commune was estimated to be approximately 14,000 in 2001 commune census.

Primary and junior level secondary education are available in town. The majority 98% of the population of the commune are farmers. The most important crop is rice, while other important products are maize, sweet potatoes and potatoes. Industry and services provide both employment for 1% of the population.
