= Tratramarina =

- Rural commune
- Location within Madagascar
- Coordinates: 19°27′S 48°15′E
- Country: Madagascar
- Region: Alaotra-Mangoro
- District: Anosibe An'ala
- Elevation: 800 m (2,600 ft)
- Highest elevation: 1,150 m (3,770 ft)

Population (2018)
  - Total: 4,739
- Postal code: 506
- Climate: Cwa

Tratramarina is a rural commune in Anosibe An'ala District, in Alaotra-Mangoro Region, Madagascar.

== Religion ==
- FJKM - Fiangonan'i Jesoa Kristy eto Madagasikara (Church of Jesus Christ in Madagascar)

== Agriculture ==
Main crops are rice, manioc, coffee, Cloves, peanuts and honey.
