= Antakasina =

- Location in Madagascar
- Coordinates: 19°32′S 47°46′E
- Country: Madagascar
- Region: Vakinankaratra
- District: Ambatolampy
- Elevation: 1,599 m (5,246 ft)

Population (2001)
  - Total: 14,000
- Time zone: UTC3 (EAT)

Antakasina is a town and commune in Madagascar. It belongs to the district of Ambatolampy, which is a part of Vakinankaratra Region. The population of the commune was estimated to be approximately 14,000 in 2001 commune census.

Only primary schooling is available. It is also a site of industrial-scale mining. The majority 98% of the population of the commune are farmers. The most important crops are rice and potatoes; also maize is an important agricultural product. Industry and services provide employment for 1.75% and 0.25% of the population, respectively.
