= Behenjy =

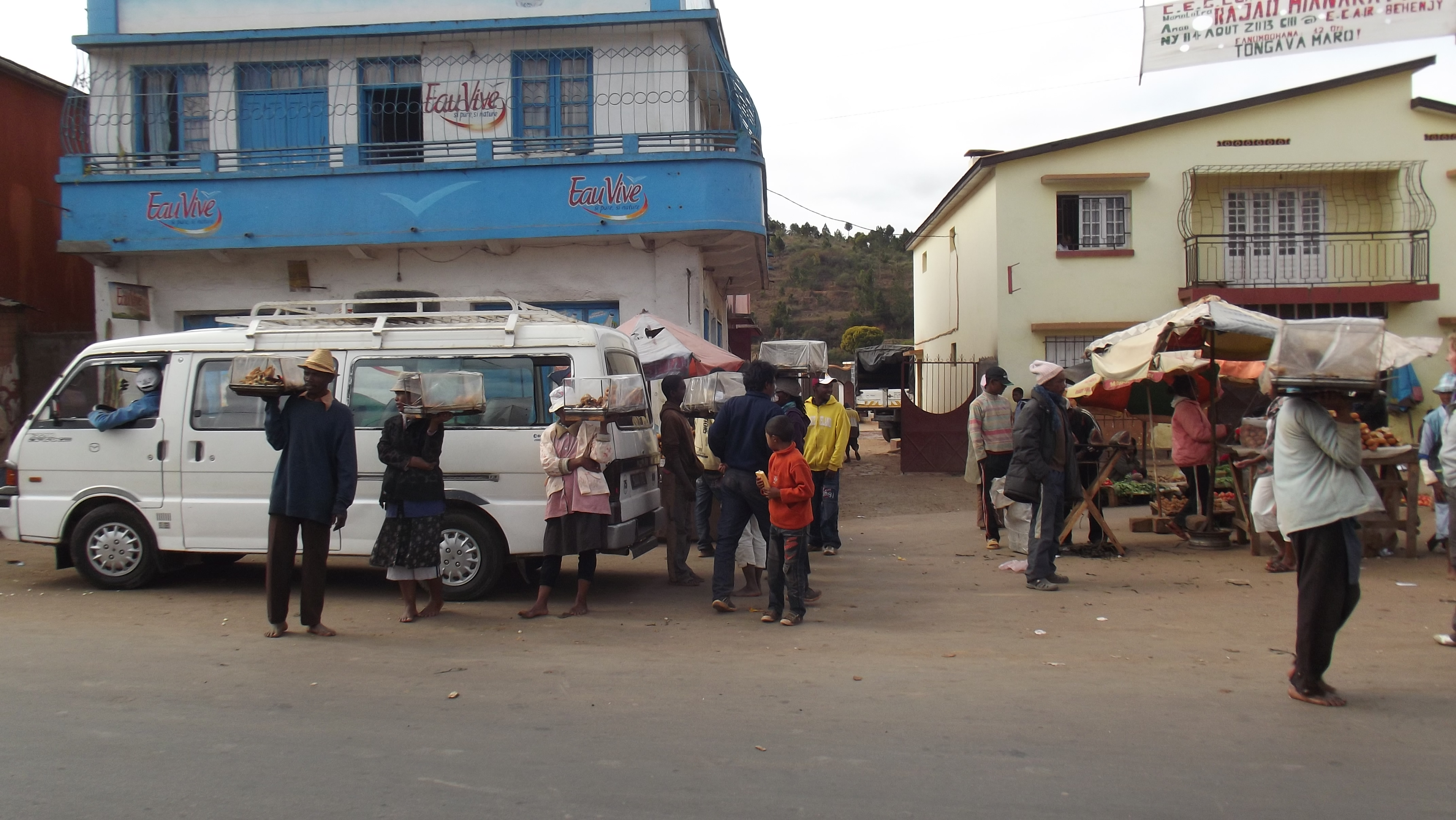
- Behenjy

- Location in Madagascar
- Coordinates: 19°12′S 47°29′E
- Country: Madagascar
- Region: Vakinankaratra
- District: Ambatolampy
- Elevation: 1,418 m (4,652 ft)

Population (2001)
  - Total: 18,000
- Time zone: UTC3 (EAT)
- Postal code: 104

Behenjy is a rural municipality in Madagascar. It belongs to the district of Ambatolampy, which is a part of Vakinankaratra Region. The population of the commune was estimated to be approximately 18,000 in 2001 commune census.

== Transport ==
The town is situated on one of the principal roads of Madagascar, the RN 7 that connects the city with the capital Antananarivo and Antsirabe. Behenjy is situated at 44 km south of Antananarivo and 122 km north of Antsirabe. Furthermore it is situated also on the provincial road 71 to Imerintsiatosika (and the RN 1).

Primary and junior level secondary education are available in town. The majority 50% of the population of the commune are farmers, while an additional 30% receives their livelihood from raising ivestock. The most important crop is rice, while other important products are vegetables, beans, maize and cassava. Industry and services provide employment for 15% and 5% of the population, respectively.

== Rivers ==
The Andromba River.

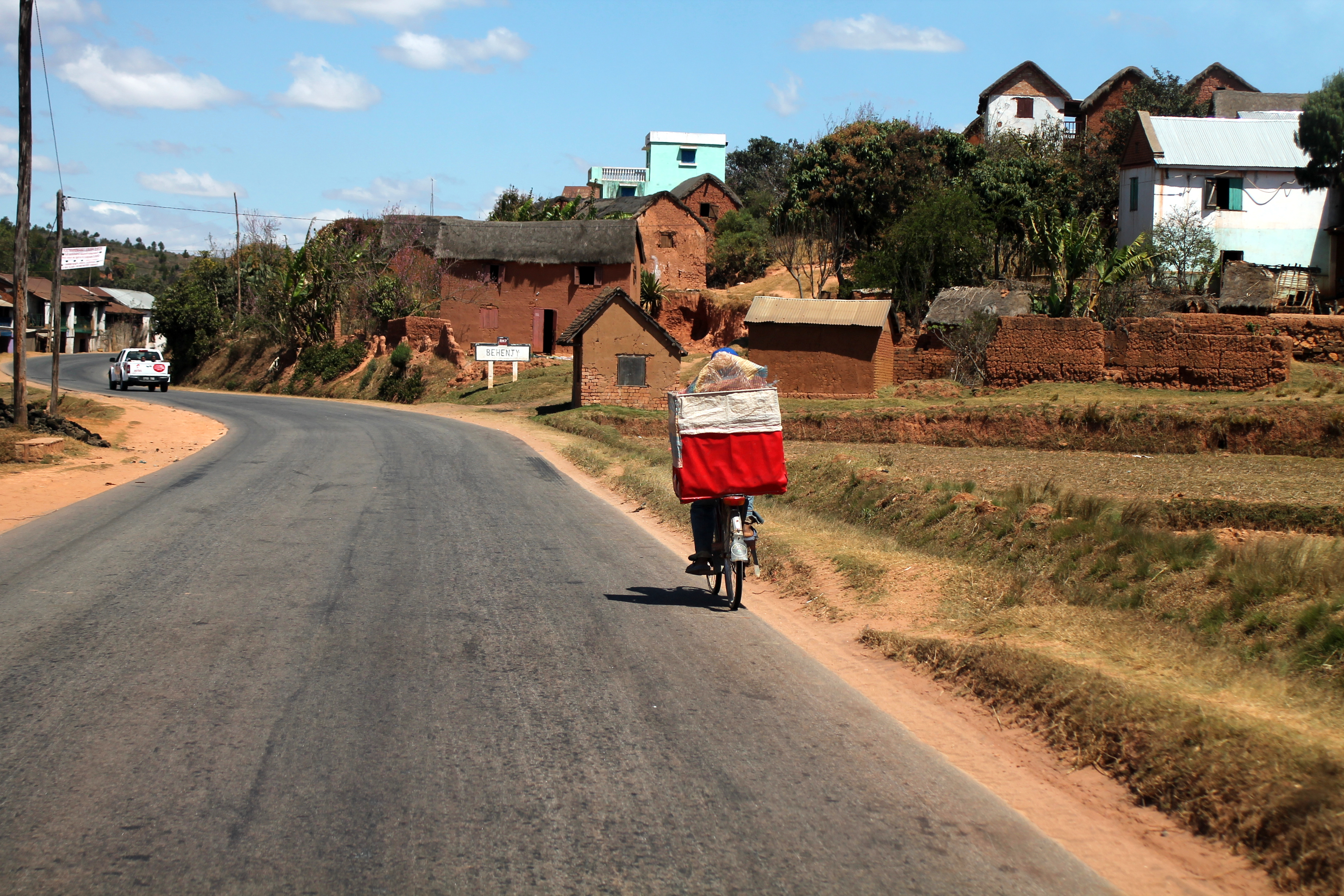

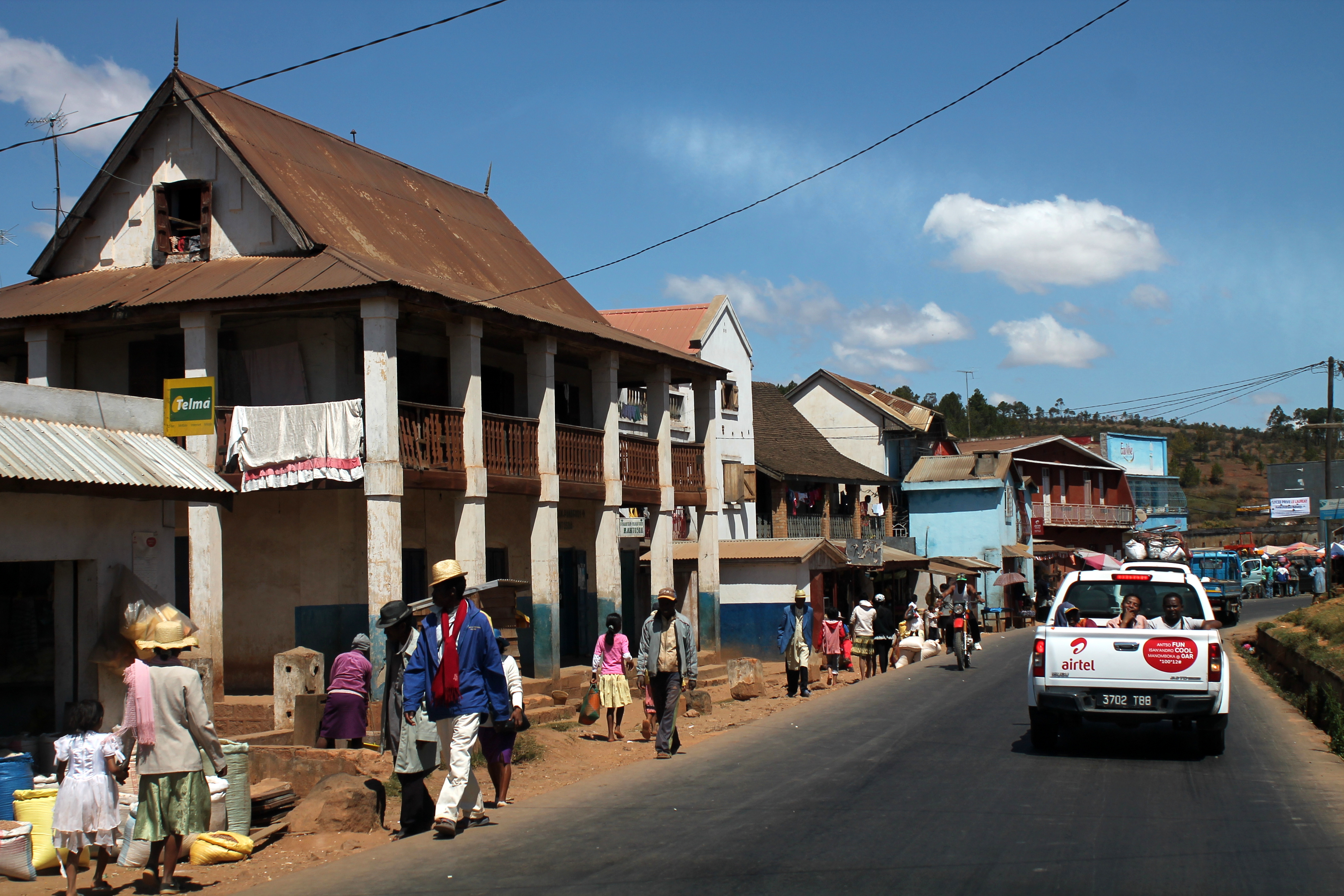

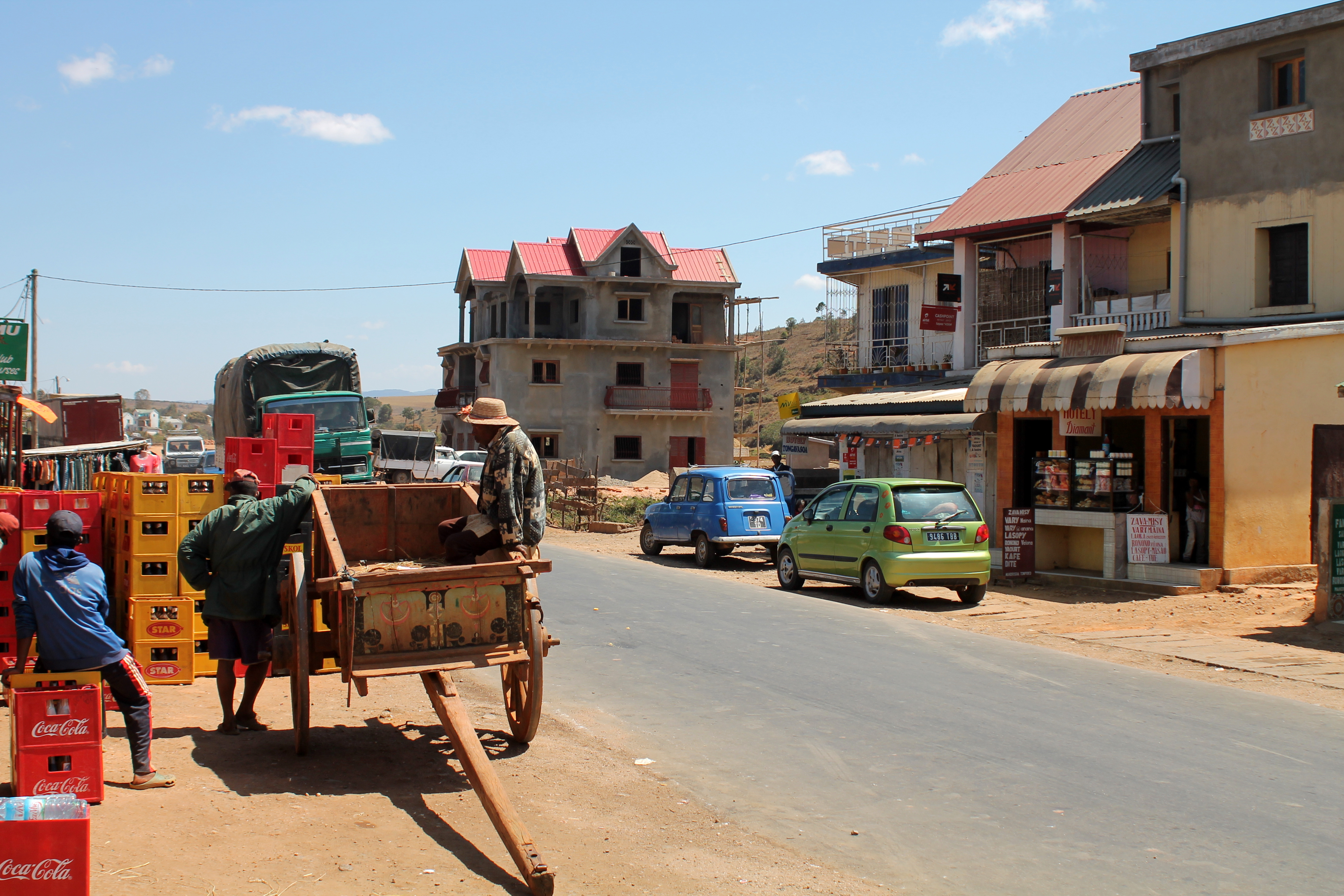

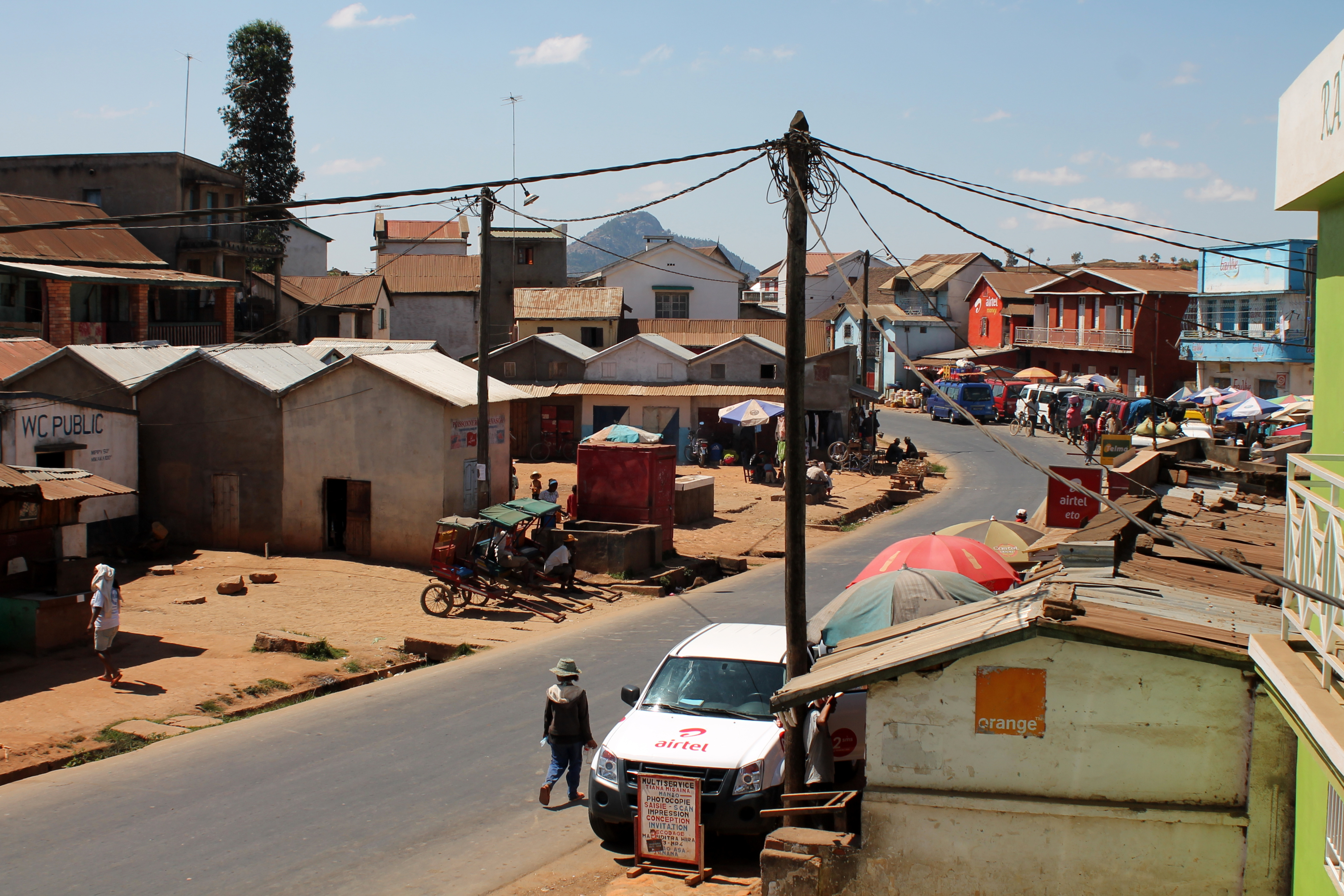

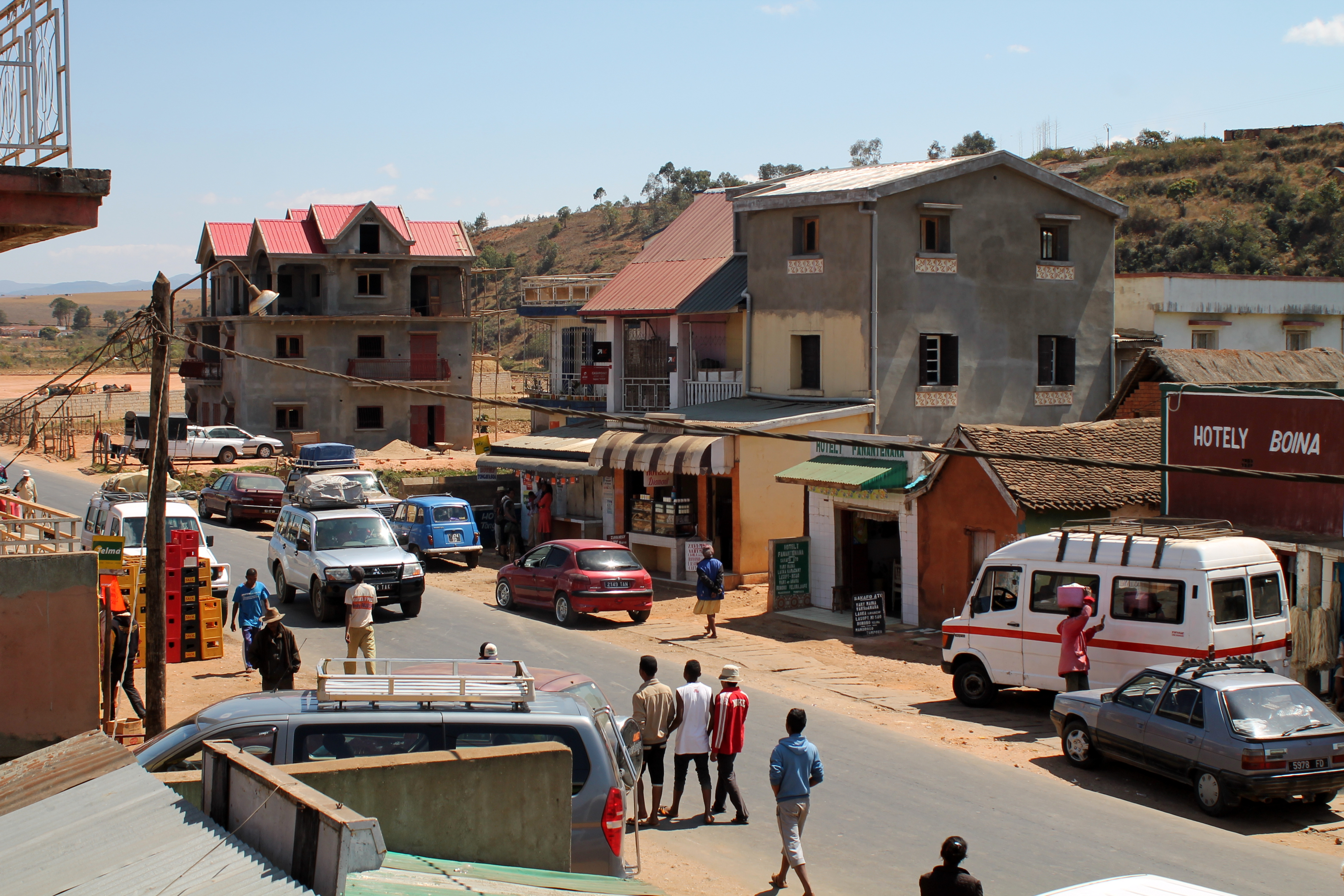

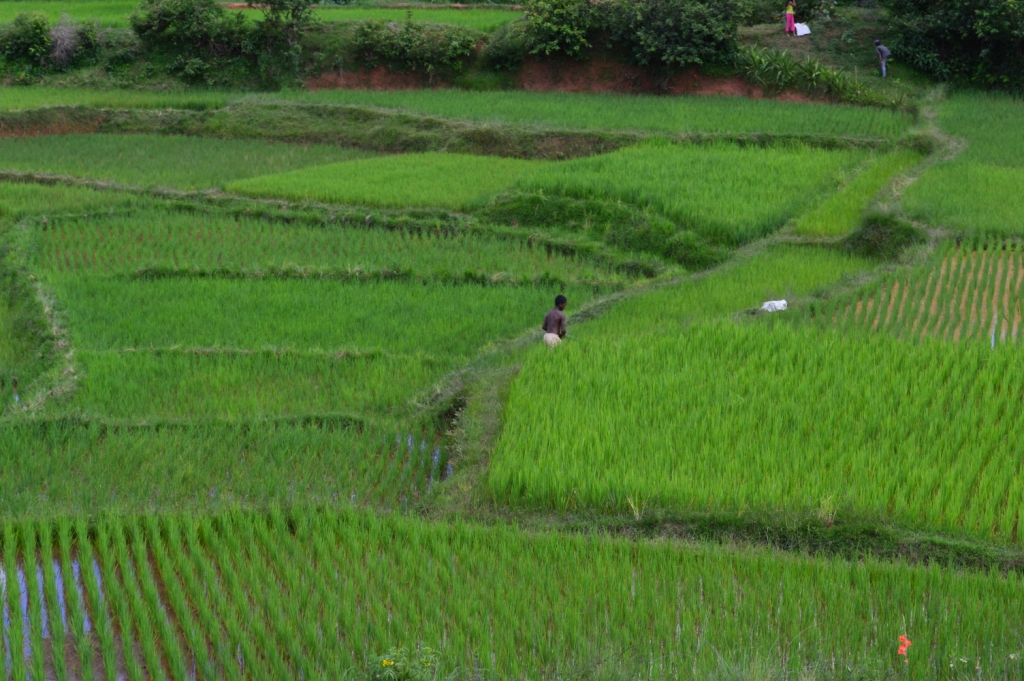
