= Andranovelona =

- Location in Madagascar
- Coordinates: 19°39′S 47°38′E
- Country: Madagascar
- Region: Vakinankaratra
- District: Ambatolampy
- Elevation: 1,576 m (5,171 ft)

Population (2001)
  - Total: 15,000
- Time zone: UTC3 (EAT)

Andranovelona is a town and commune in Madagascar. It belongs to the district of Ambatolampy, which is a part of Vakinankaratra region. The population of the commune was estimated to be approximately 15,000 in 2001 commune census.

Primary and junior level secondary education are available in town. The majority 94% of the population of the commune are farmers, while an additional 1% receives their livelihood from raising livestock. The most important crop is rice, while other important products are maize, cassava and potatoes. Industry and services provide employment for 4% and 1% of the population, respectively.
