= Mount Tsiafajavona =

Mountain in Madagascar

Tsiafajavona
- Location within Madagascar Location within Africa

Highest point
- Elevation: 2,643 m (8,671 ft)
- Prominence: 1,658 m (5,440 ft)
- Listing: Ultra; Ribu
- Coordinates: 19°22′16″S 47°14′06″E

Geography
- Country: Madagascar
- Region: Vakinankaratra
- District: Ambatolampy
- Municipality: Tsiafajavona Ankaratra
- Parent range: Ankaratra

Tsiafajavona is the third highest mountain in the Madagascar, rising 2,643 m (8,671 ft) above sea level. It is situated in the Ankaratra massif, in a distance of 16 km (9.9 mi) west of Ambatolampy.
