= RIP73 (Madagascar) =

Road in Madagascar

Location
- Country: Madagascar

Highway system
- Roads in Madagascar

RIP 73 (route d’intérêt provincial 73) is a secondary road in Vakinankaratra, Madagascar. It has a length of 12 kilometres (7.5 mi) and links Tsiafajavona Ankaratra to Ambatolampy in Vakinankaratra.

== See also ==
- List of roads in Madagascar
- Transport in Madagascar
