= RIP23 (Madagascar) =

Road in Madagascar

Location
- Country: Madagascar

Highway system
- Roads in Madagascar

RIP 23 (route d’intérêt provincial 23) is an unpaved, secondary road in the region of Alaotra-Mangoro, Madagascar. It has a length of 72 kilometres (45 mi) and links Moramanga to Anosibe An'ala. It is only suitable for 4x4 driven cars.

== See also ==
- List of roads in Madagascar
- Transport in Madagascar
