= Ambodimerana =

- rural commune
- Location within Madagascar
- Coordinates: 19°26′S 48°25′E
- Country: Madagascar
- Region: Alaotra-Mangoro
- District: Anosibe An'ala

Population (2018)
  - Total: 5,630
- Postal code: 506
- Climate: Cwa

Ambodimerana is a rural commune in Anosibe An'ala District, in Alaotra-Mangoro Region, Madagascar. It has a population of 5,630 in 2018.
