= RIP202D (Madagascar) =

Road in Sava Region, Madagascar

Location
- Country: Madagascar

Highway system
- Roads in Madagascar

RIP 202D (route d’intérêt provincial 202D) is a secondary road in Sava Region, Madagascar. It has a length of 31.4 kilometres (19.5 mi) and links Nosiarina, Bemanevika and Tanambao Daoud.

== See also ==
- List of roads in Madagascar
- Transport in Madagascar
