= Sandrangato =

River in Madagascar

Coordinates: 19°09′S 48°14′E

The Sandrangato is a river that flows near Anosibe An'ala, Alaotra-Mangoro Region, Madagascar. It is located at 72 km from Moramanga.
