= Antandrokomby =

Commune of Madagascar

Coordinates: 18.89972°S 48.59987°E

Antandrokomby is a city in Anosibe An'ala District, Alaotra-Mangoro Region, Madagascar. Its population in the 2018 census was 14,848.
