= Tsinjoarivo, Ambatolampy =

Tsinjoarivo
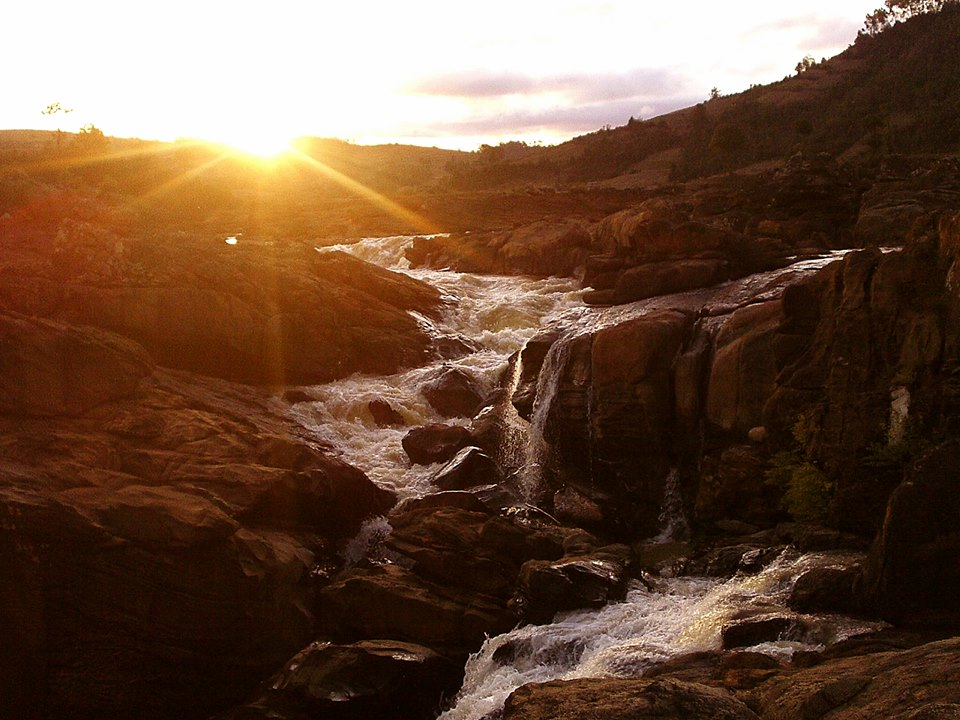
- The Onive River at Tsinjoarivo

- Location in Madagascar
- Coordinates: 19°38′S 47°41′E
- Country: Madagascar
- Region: Vakinankaratra
- District: Ambatolampy

Area
  - Total: 594 km^{2} (229 sq mi)
- Elevation: 1,561 m (5,121 ft)

Population (2018)(estimation)
  - Total: 28,108
- Time zone: UTC3 (EAT)
- Postal code: 104

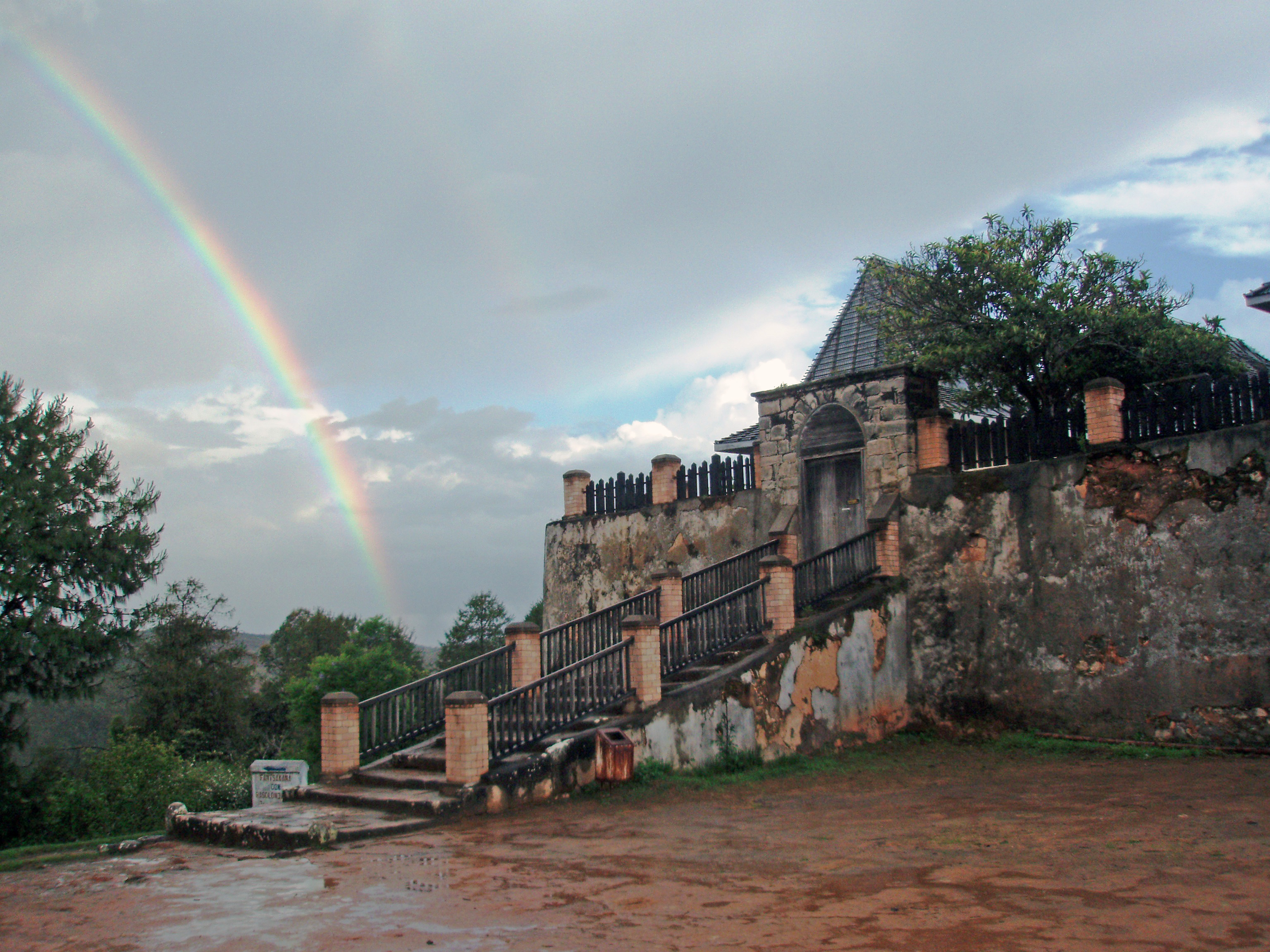
Rova of Tsinjoarivo

Tsinjoarivo is a rural municipality in Madagascar. It is located in the district of Ambatolampy, which is in the Vakinankaratra Region, and is alongside the Onive River. The population of the commune was estimated to be approximately 20,000 in 2001 commune census. It is situated at a distance of 45 km from Ambatolampy.

14 fokontany (villages) belong to this municipality.

Primary and junior level secondary education are available in town. The majority 99% of the population of the commune are farmers. The most important crop is rice, while other important products are beans, maize, cassava and potatoes. Services provide employment for 1% of the population.

Due to its outstanding universal cultural value, the city, along with its associated rova, was added onto the UNESCO Tentative List of World Heritage Sites in Madagascar on November 14, 1997, in the cultural category.

Notable waterfalls are located along the Onive River on the southwest side of the town. They have a height of 50m.

== Mining ==
There is some artisanal activity of gold mining in this municipality. Also some sapphires can be found.

== See also ==
- List of World Heritage Sites in Madagascar
