= Antaramena =

- District
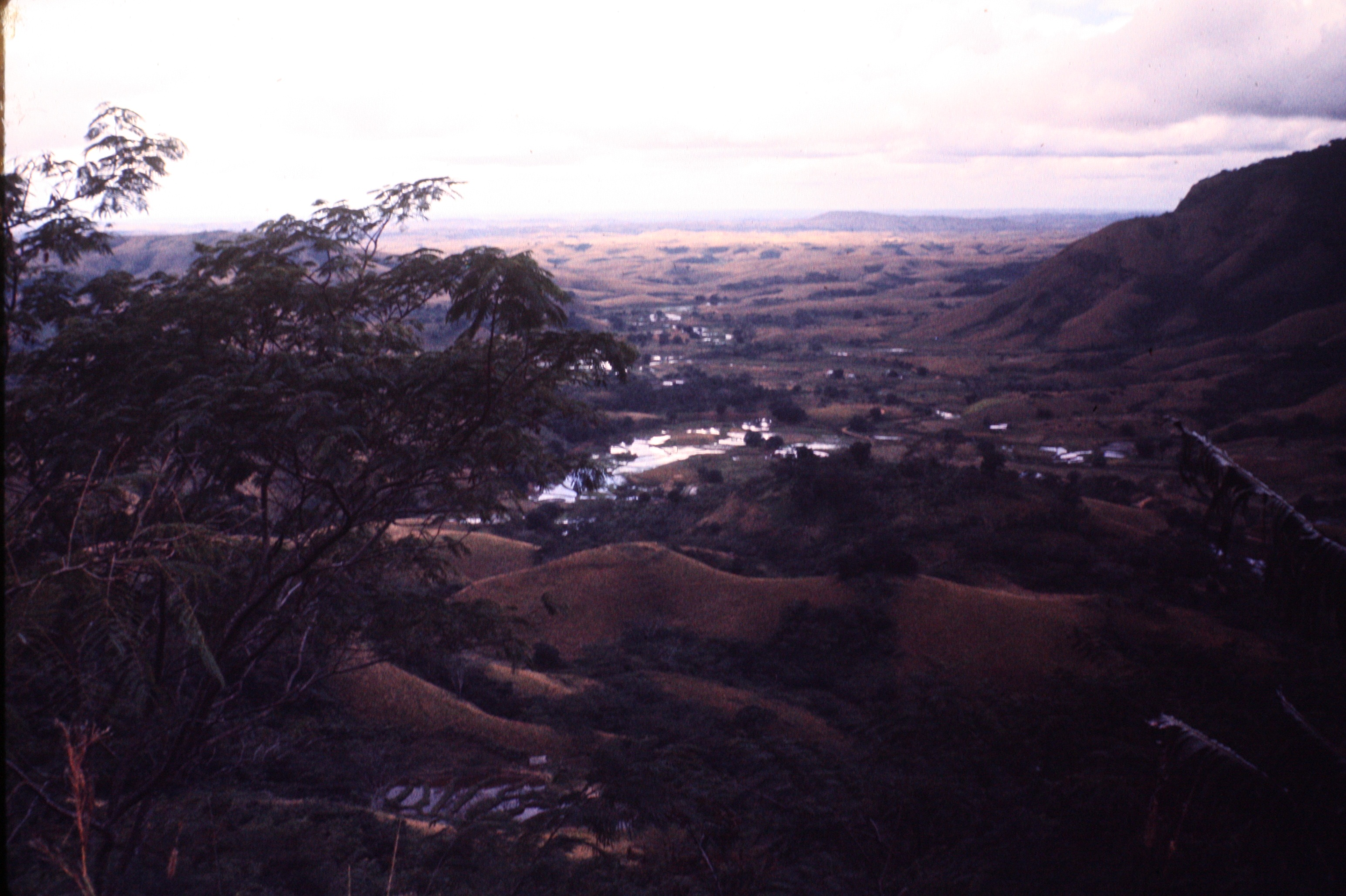
- Ivohibe

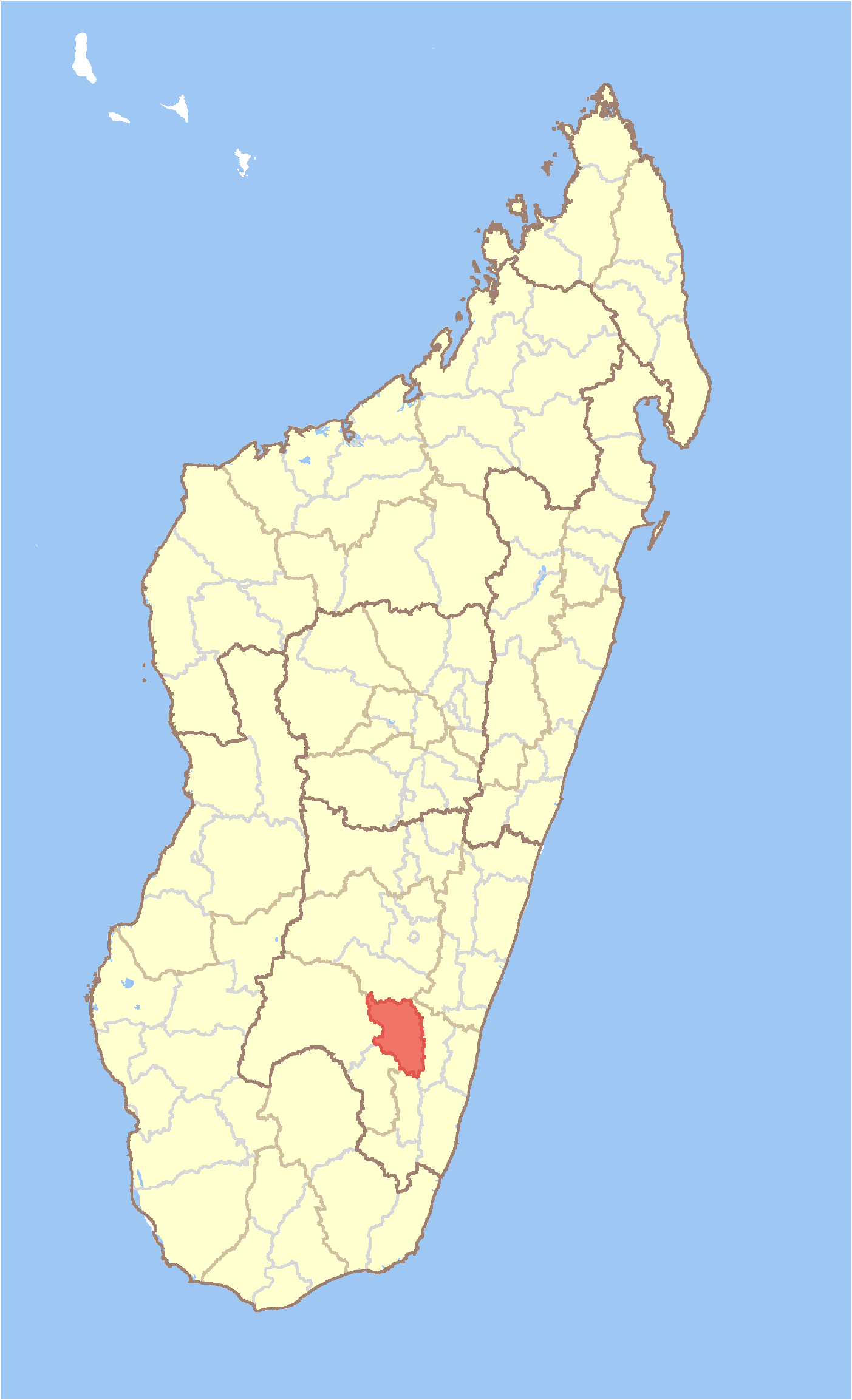
- Location in Madagascar
- Coordinates: 22°38′S 46°53′E
- Country: Madagascar
- Region: Ihorombe
- Elevation: 635 m (2,083 ft)

Population (2018)Census
  - Total: 7,405
- Time zone: UTC3 (EAT)
- Postal code: 315

Antaramena is a municipality in Ihorombe Region in central Madagascar.

It is connected with Ihosy in the west, and Farafangana in the east by the largely unpaved Route nationale 27.
