= Ambohipihaonana, Ambatolampy =

Ambohipihaonana
- Location in Madagascar
- Coordinates: 19°26′S 47°25′E
- Country: Madagascar
- Region: Vakinankaratra
- District: Ambatolampy
- Elevation: 1,577 m (5,174 ft)

Population (2001)
  - Total: 17,000
- Time zone: UTC3 (EAT)

Ambohipihaonana is a town and commune in Madagascar. It belongs to the district of Ambatolampy, which is a part of Vakinankaratra region. The population of the commune was estimated to be approximately 17,000 in 2001 commune census.

Primary and junior level secondary education are available in town. It is also a site of industrial-scale mining. The majority 98% of the population of the commune are farmers. The most important crop is rice, while other important products are maize, cassava, sweet potatoes and tobacco. Industry and services provide employment for 1.5% and 0.5% of the population, respectively.
