= Sabotsy Namatoana =

- Location in Madagascar
- Coordinates: 19°18′S 47°22′E
- Country: Madagascar
- Region: Vakinankaratra
- District: Ambatolampy
- Elevation: 1,604 m (5,262 ft)

Population (2001)
  - Total: 8,000
- Time zone: UTC3 (EAT)

Sabotsy Namatoana is a town and commune in Madagascar. It belongs to the district of Ambatolampy, which is a part of Vakinankaratra Region. The population of the commune was estimated to be approximately 8,000 in 2001 commune census.

Only primary schooling is available. The majority 97% of the population of the commune are farmers, while an additional 1% receives their livelihood from raising livestock. The most important crops are rice and potatoes, while other important agricultural products are beans and sweet potatoes. Industry and services provide both employment for 1% of the population.
