= Lova Rajaona =

Mayor of Antanifotsy since 2019

Mayor of Antanifotsy
- Incumbent
- Assumed office 2019

Personal details
- Born: Tosiharilova Rajaona; 6 April 1974 Antanifotsy, Madagascar
- Parent: Justin Rajaona (father)
- Education: University of Bergen; Lycée Voltaire (Orléans)

Tosiharilova Rajaona (born 6 April 1974) is a Malagasy politician who has served as the mayor of Antanifotsy since 2019. Born and raised in Antanifotsy, she moved to France and later Norway to pursue her secondary and post-secondary studies abroad. She ultimately chose to stay in Norway and start a family there, making regular trips to her hometown to run local community projects through her Bluways organisation. After spending nearly two decades in Norway, Rajaona returned to Antanifotsy to run for political office, believing that she could do more for her hometown in a position of power. She was elected mayor of Antanifotsy in 2019.

== Early life and education ==
Tosiharilova Rajaona was born on 6 April 1974 in the rural commune of Antanifotsy. Her father was Justin Rajaona, previously the member of parliament for Antanifotsy. After finishing her second year of secondary school in Madagascar, Rajaona moved to France where she studied at Lycée Voltaire in Orléans. She then moved to Norway to continue her secondary and post-secondary studies. She graduated from the University of Bergen and thereafter chose to settle in Norway, starting a family there. She founded the Blueways organisation to combat poverty in Madagascar through community projects, particularly in the field of education. Rajaona's regular trips to her hometown, in which she observed growing poverty and deteriorating living conditions, eventually convinced her to return to Madagascar after nearly two decades in Norway.

== Political career ==
Rajaona hoped to "contribute to the reconstruction" of Antanifotsy through political office. A few months after she returned to Madagascar in 2019, the country held national and local elections, including the mayoral race for Antanifotsy. Following her father's footsteps, she declined a job offer as a deputy and pursued electoral politics, running in and winning the mayoral race in her hometown. Rajaona became the first woman mayor of Antanifotsy. Upon accepting her mandate, Rajaona said, "My father did his part for the population, and now it's my turn to do mine."

Rajaona launched an ambitious reform program shortly after becoming mayor. She aimed to combat corruption and improve the efficiency of the local administration by providing online services. The first breakthrough of her mayorship was the acceleration of the process for citizens to obtain copies of their civil documents. Rajaona celebrated her administration's achievement by saying, "Before, it took a week. Today, 15 minutes is enough." She credited the initiative's success to the personnel management skills she learned in Norway.

Rajaona's early efforts to create a sense of community and collective responsibility in Antanifotsy were less successful. According to Rajaona, residents were not responsive to her campaign to clean up the commune's streets, particularly the waste around the town hall. In response, Rajaona participated in communal baths and began community discussions on development to connect with the local populace. She also encouraged her colleagues in the local administration to do the same. She later stated that the goal was to have citizens familiarise themselves with the local authorities, so that they may work together effectively. One consequence of this initiative was an increase in the observance of tax collection, which rose from almost nothing at the start of Rajaona's mandate to 70% near the end.

Rajaona met with several national ministers throughout her tenure to discuss the revitalisation and development of Antanifotsy.
