= Tsaravinany =

- rural commune
- Location within Madagascar
- Coordinates: 19°44′16.4″S 48°43′14.2″E
- Country: Madagascar
- Region: Alaotra-Mangoro
- District: Anosibe An'ala

Population (2018)
  - Total: 6,880
- Postal code: 506
- Climate: Cwa

Tsaravinany is a rural commune in Anosibe An'ala District, in Alaotra-Mangoro Region, Madagascar. It has a population of 6,880 in 2018.
