= Andriambilany =

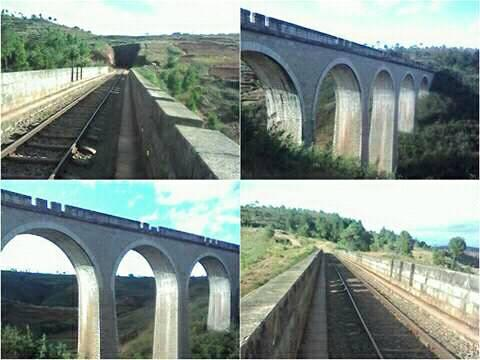
- Andriambilany bridge

- Location in Madagascar
- Coordinates: 19°19′S 47°28′E
- Country: Madagascar
- Region: Vakinankaratra
- District: Ambatolampy
- Elevation: 1,468 m (4,816 ft)

Population (2001)
  - Total: 6,000
- Time zone: UTC3 (EAT)
- Postal code: 104

Andriambilany is a rural municipality in Madagascar. It belongs to the district of Ambatolampy, which is a part of Vakinankaratra region. It is situated at 13 km north of Ambatolampy and 57 km from Antananarivo, the capital. The population of the commune was estimated to be approximately 6,000 in 2001 commune census.

Primary and junior level secondary education are available in town. The majority 90% of the population of the commune are farmers, while an additional 6% receives their livelihood from raising livestock. The most important crop is rice, while other important products are fruits, beans, maize and cassava. Industry and services provide employment for 3% and 1% of the population, respectively.
