= Anosibe An'ala District =

Coordinates: 19.30077°S 48.36182°E

Anosibe An'ala District is a district in the Alaotra-Mangoro region in Madagascar. Its capital is Anosibe An'ala. The district has an area of 2,859 km^{2} (1,104 sq mi), and the estimated population in 2020 was 118,439.

== Communes ==
The district is further divided into 11 communes:

- Ambalaomby
- Ambatoharanana
- Ambodimerana
- Ampandoantraka
- Ampasimaneva
- Anosibe An'ala
- Antandrokomby
- Longozabe
- Niarovana Marosampanana
- Tratramarina
- Tsaravinany
