= Antanamalaza =

- Location in Madagascar
- Coordinates: 19°24′S 47°38′E
- Country: Madagascar
- Region: Vakinankaratra
- District: Ambatolampy
- Elevation: 1,603 m (5,259 ft)

Population (2001)
  - Total: 12,000
- Time zone: UTC3 (EAT)

Antanamalaza is a town and commune in Madagascar. It belongs to the district of Ambatolampy, which is a part of Vakinankaratra Region. The population of the commune was estimated to be approximately 12,000 in 2001 commune census.

Primary and junior level secondary education are available in town. The majority 85% of the population of the commune are farmers. The most important crop is rice, while other important products are beans, maize, cassava and potatoes. Services provide employment for 15% of the population.
