= Ampandoantraka =

City in Madagascar

Coordinates: 19°44′S 47°58′E

Ampandoantraka is a city in Anosibe An'ala District, Alaotra-Mangoro, Madagascar. It has a population of 10,669 inhabitants.
