= Longozabe =

- Location within Madagascar
- Coordinates: 19°44′S 47°12′E
- Country: Madagascar
- Region: Alaotra-Mangoro
- District: Anosibe An'ala

Area
  - Land: 584 km^{2} (225 sq mi)
- Postal code: 506

Longozabe is a rural municipality in Anosibe An'ala District, Alaotra-Mangoro Region, Madagascar.
