= Ampasimaneva =

- Location within Madagascar
- Coordinates: 19°21′S 47°18′E
- Country: Madagascar
- Region: Alaotra-Mangoro
- District: Anosibe An'ala
- Postal code: 506

Ampasimaneva is a village in Anosibe An'ala District, Alaotra-Mangoro Region, Madagascar. It has a population of approx. 2000 inhabitants and is situated at a distance of 180 km from the capital of Antananarivo.

== Rivers ==
Amasimaneva is situated at the Mangoro River.
