= Ankaratra =

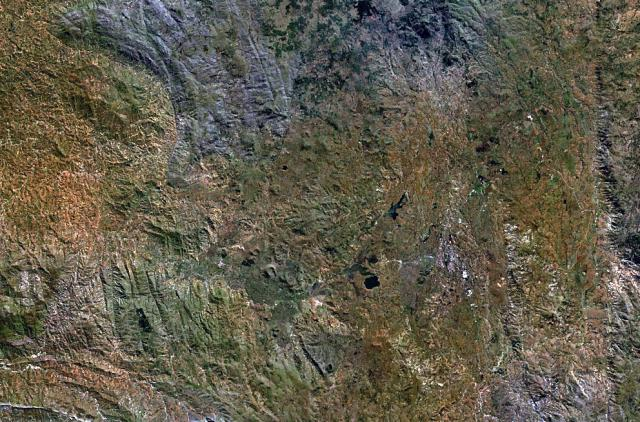

Highest point
- Peak: Mount Tsiafajavona
- Elevation: 2,644 m (8,675 ft)

Geography
- Location within Madagascar
- Country: Madagascar
- Range coordinates: 19°25′S 47°12′E

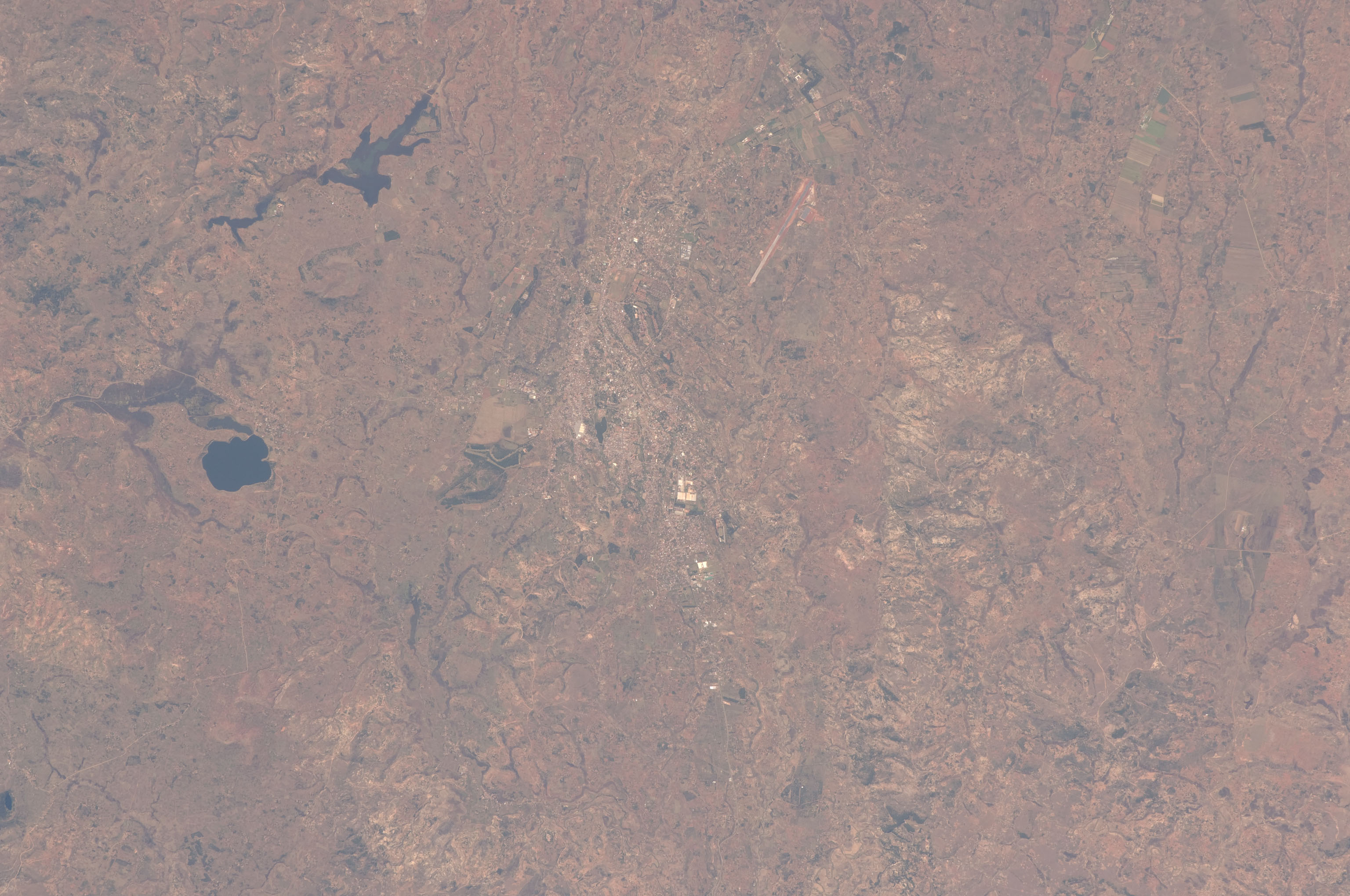
Ankaratra and Antsirabe

Ankaratra is a cinder cone volcanic range located about 50 km (30 mi) southwest of Antananarivo, the capital city of Madagascar. It lies between the towns of Arivonimamo to the north, Ambatolampy to the east, Faratsiho to the west and Betafo to the south. It is located in the Central Highlands. The highest peak in Ankaratra is Mount Tsiafajavona ("never out of the fog"), at 2,644 metres (8,668 ft.) above sea level. Some trace of activity remains in the southernmost part of the range, creating hot springs in the area around Antsirabe. The last eruption of Ankaratra took place in the very recent Quaternary.

== See also ==
- List of volcanoes in Madagascar
