= Antanimasaka, Ambatolampy =

Antanimasaka
- Location in Madagascar
- Coordinates: 19°24′S 47°34′E
- Country: Madagascar
- Region: Vakinankaratra
- District: Ambatolampy
- Elevation: 1,594 m (5,230 ft)

Population (2001)
  - Total: 5,000
- Time zone: UTC3 (EAT)

Antanimasaka is a town and commune in Madagascar. It belongs to the district of Ambatolampy, which is a part of Vakinankaratra Region. The population of the commune was estimated to be approximately 5,000 in 2001 commune census.

Only primary schooling is available. The majority 98% of the population of the commune are farmers, while an additional 1% receives their livelihood from raising livestock. The most important crop is rice, while other important products are sweet potatoes and potatoes. Services provide employment for 1% of the population.
