= Kotipa =

- District
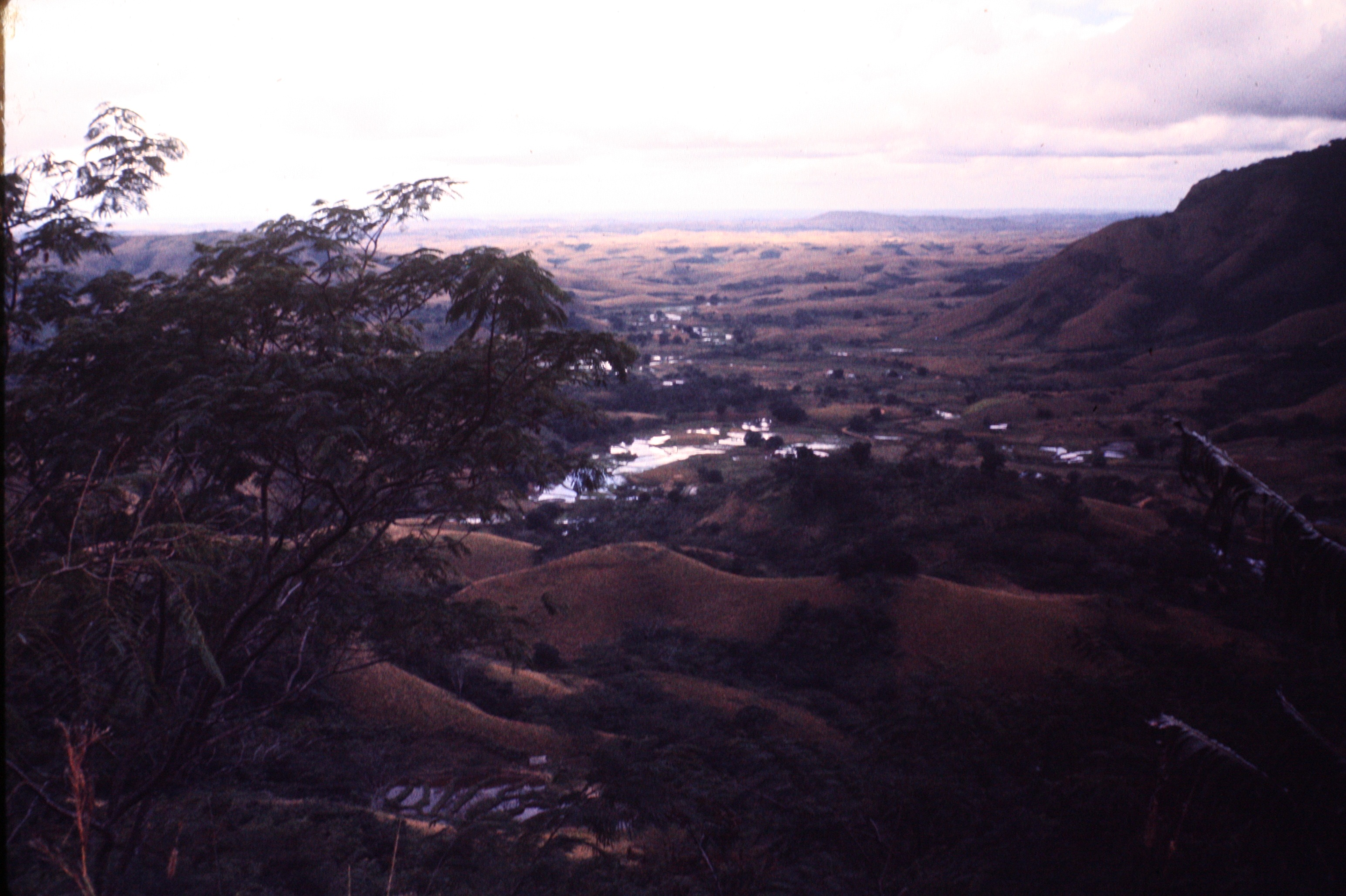
- Ivohibe

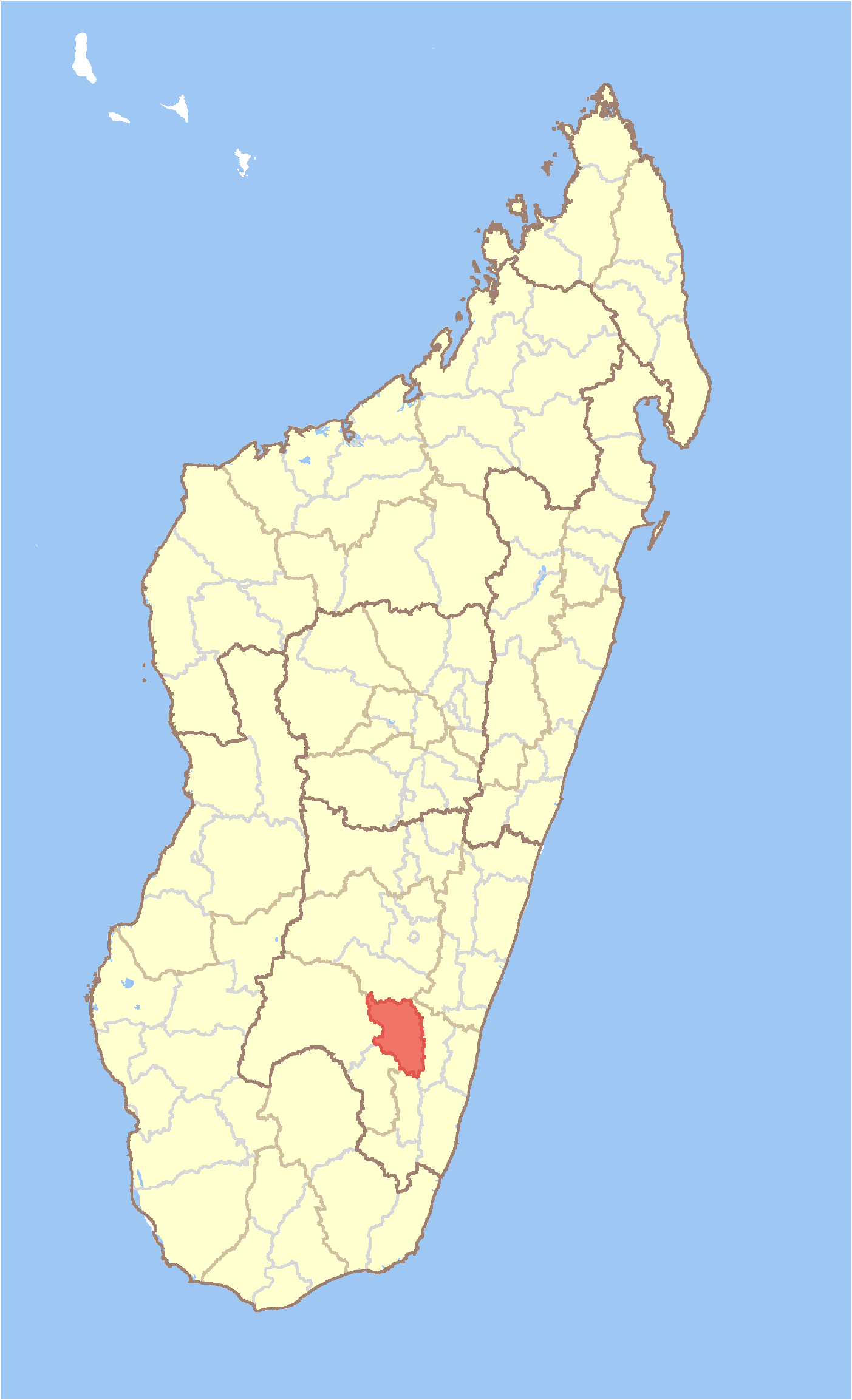
- Location in Madagascar
- Coordinates: 22°19′S 46°36′E
- Country: Madagascar
- Region: Ihorombe
- Elevation: 898 m (2,946 ft)

Population (2018)Census
  - Total: 5,127
- Time zone: UTC3 (EAT)
- Postal code: 315

Kotipa is a rural municipality in Ihorombe Region in central Madagascar.
