= Marotolana, Ambanja =

Marotolana
- Location in Madagascar
- Coordinates: 14°1′S 48°37′E
- Country: Madagascar
- Region: Diana
- District: Ambanja
- Elevation: 143 m (469 ft)

Population (2001)
  - Total: 10,538
- Time zone: UTC3 (EAT)

Marotolana is a municipality (French: commune, Malagasy: kaominina) in Madagascar. It belongs to the district of Ambanja, which is a part of Diana Region. According to 2001 census the population of Marotolana was 10,538.

Only primary schooling is available in town. 99% of the population are farmers. The most important crops are rice and coffee, while other important agricultural products are cocoa and pepper. Services provide employment for 1% of the population.
