= Maroala =

- Location in Madagascar
- Coordinates: 15°23′S 47°59′E
- Country: Madagascar
- Region: Sofia
- District: Antsohihy
- Elevation: 43 m (141 ft)

Population (2001)
  - Total: 6,000
- Time zone: UTC3 (EAT)

Maroala is a town and commune (Malagasy: kaominina) in Madagascar. It belongs to the district of Antsohihy, which is a part of Sofia Region. The population of the commune was estimated to be approximately 6,000 in 2001 commune census.

Primary and junior level secondary education are available in town. The majority 60% of the population of the commune are farmers, while an additional 3% receive their livelihood from raising livestock. The most important crop is rice, while other important products are maize, cassava and onions. Services provide employment for 2% of the population. Additionally fishing employs 35% of the population.

== Geography ==
Maroala is situated at the Sofia River.
