= Tsiafajavona Ankaratra =

- Location in Madagascar
- Coordinates: 19°23′S 47°21′E
- Country: Madagascar
- Region: Vakinankaratra
- District: Ambatolampy

Government
  - Mayor: Jean Eric Ratsiandavana
- Elevation: 1,603 m (5,259 ft)

Population (2001)
  - Total: 15,000
- Time zone: UTC3 (EAT)
- Postal code: 104

Tsiafajavona Ankaratra is a rural municipality in Madagascar. It belongs to the district of Ambatolampy, which is a part of Vakinankaratra Region. The population of the commune was estimated to be approximately 15,000 in 2001 commune census. It is situated at 12 km from Ambatolampy and 79 km from the capital Antananarivo.

Only primary schooling is available. The majority 97% of the population of the commune are farmers, while an additional 1% receives their livelihood from raising livestock. The most important crops are rice and potatoes, while other important agricultural products are beans and maize. Industry and services provide both employment for 1% of the population.

== Mountains ==
The third highest peak in Madagascar, the Mount Tsiafajavona is situated in this municipality.

== Roads ==
The unpaved Regional Road — Rip73 leads to Ambatolampy over 12 km. It is in a good state of conservation.
