= Anosibe An'ala =

- City
- Location within Madagascar
- Coordinates: 19°09′S 48°14′E
- Country: Madagascar
- Region: Alaotra-Mangoro
- District: Anosibe An'ala

Area
  - Total: 2,660 km^{2} (1,030 sq mi)
- Elevation: 800 m (2,600 ft)
- Highest elevation: 1,325 m (4,347 ft)

Population (2018)
  - Total: 27,191
  - Density: 10.2/km^{2} (26.5/sq mi)
- Climate: Cwa

Anosibe An'ala is a city in Anosibe An'ala District, Alaotra-Mangoro Region, Madagascar. It is situated at 186 km from Antananarivo and 72 km from Moramanga to which it is linked by the unpaved road RIP23 that is only suitable for 4x4 driven cars.

The Sandrangato river flows near this town where it also forms the Niagarakely falls. The town is also close to the rivers Menakoranga and Menambolosa. Also the Manampotsy has its springs in the commune.

== Education ==
The town disposes of 58 elementary schools, 4 secondary schools and 1 Lycée. The scolarisation rate is 74%.

== Religion ==
- FJKM - Fiangonan'i Jesoa Kristy eto Madagasikara (Church of Jesus Christ in Madagascar)
- EEM - Eklesia Episkopaly Malagasy (Anglican Church of Madagascar)
- Roman Catholic Church

== Agriculture ==
Main crops are rice, manioc, coffee (1895 ha), sugar cane (895 ha), Cloves (50 ha), peanuts (25 ha) and honey.
