= Ambatolampy District =

Ambatolampy
- District
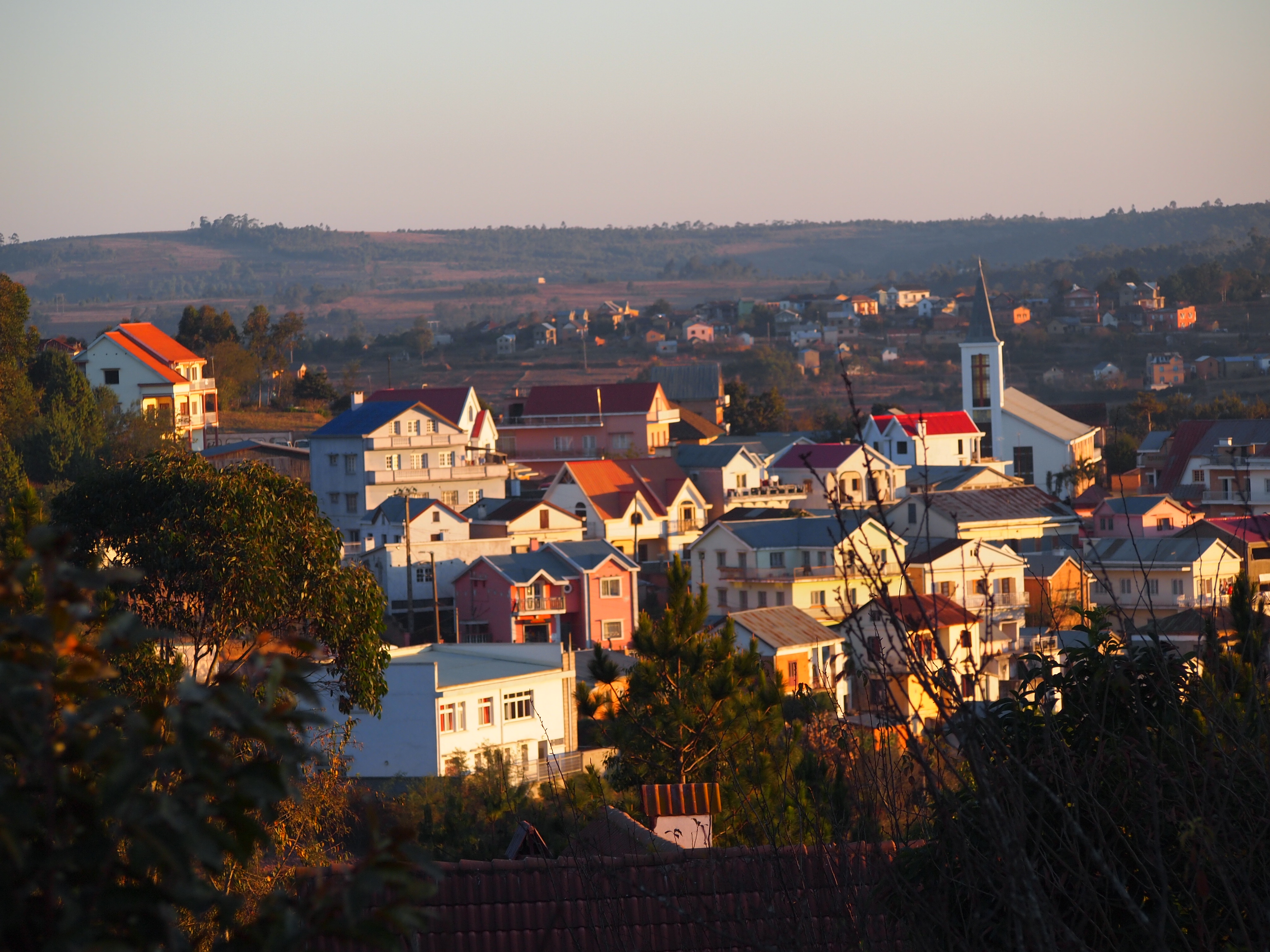
- Ambatolampy skyline

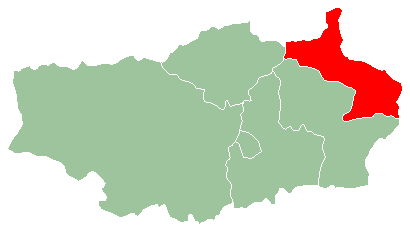
- Location of the district within the region of Vakinankaratra.
- Coordinates: 19°23′10″S 47°25′45″E
- Country: Madagascar
- Region: Vakinankaratra
- Administrative centre: Ambatolampy

Area
  - Total: 1,638 km^{2} (632 sq mi)

Population (2018)Region Vakinankaratra
  - Total: 299,512
  - Density: 182.9/km^{2} (473.6/sq mi)
- Postal code: 104

Ambatolampy is a district in Vakinankaratra Region, in Madagascar. The district has a total population estimated at 299,512 in 2018. The seat of the district administration is the town of Ambatolampy. It is situated at 70 km South from the capital Antananarivo from where it can be reached by the National road 7.

== Communes ==
The district is further divided into 19 communes:

- Ambatolampy
- Ambatondrakalavao
- Ambodifarihy Fenomanana
- Ambohipihaonana
- Andranovelona
- Andravola Vohipeno
- Andriambilany
- Antakasina
- Antanamalaza
- Antanimasaka
- Antsampandrano
- Behenjy
- Belambo
- Manjakatompo
- Morarano
- Sabotsy Namatoana
- Tsiafajavona Ankaratra
- Tsinjoarivo

== Economy ==
Ambatolampy is known for its Aluminium founderies. Most of aluminium kitchen utensils in Madagascar are produced in this region. The founderies also work with copper and bronze.

- Ambatolampy Solar Power Station

== Museums ==
In Ambatolampy, route de Tsinjoarivo, is situated the Butterfly museum (Musée des Papillons) that exhibits 6000 species of insects and butterflies.

== Roads ==
- National road 7 (from Antananarivo).
- Provincial road 71 (from Behenjy.

== Rivers ==
- Andromba River.
- Onive River

== Protected areas ==
- Manjakatompo Ankaratra natural resources reserve.
- Part of Tsinjoarivo Ambalaomby protected area.
