= Tanambao Daoud =

- Location in Madagascar
- Coordinates: 13°59′S 50°8′E
- Country: Madagascar
- Region: Sava
- District: Sambava

Population (2001)
  - Total: 10,000
- Time zone: UTC3 (EAT)
- Postal code: 208

Tanambao Daoud or Tanambao is a rural municipality in northern Madagascar. It belongs to the district of Sambava, which is a part of Sava Region. The population of the commune was estimated to be approximately 10,000 in 2001 commune census.

Only primary schooling is available in town. The majority 97.5% of the population in the commune are farmers. The most important crops are coffee and vanilla, while other important agricultural products are banana and coconut. Services provide employment for 2% of the population. Additionally fishing employs 0.5% of the population.

== Roads ==
It is situated at the Provincial road 202D.
