= Onive River =

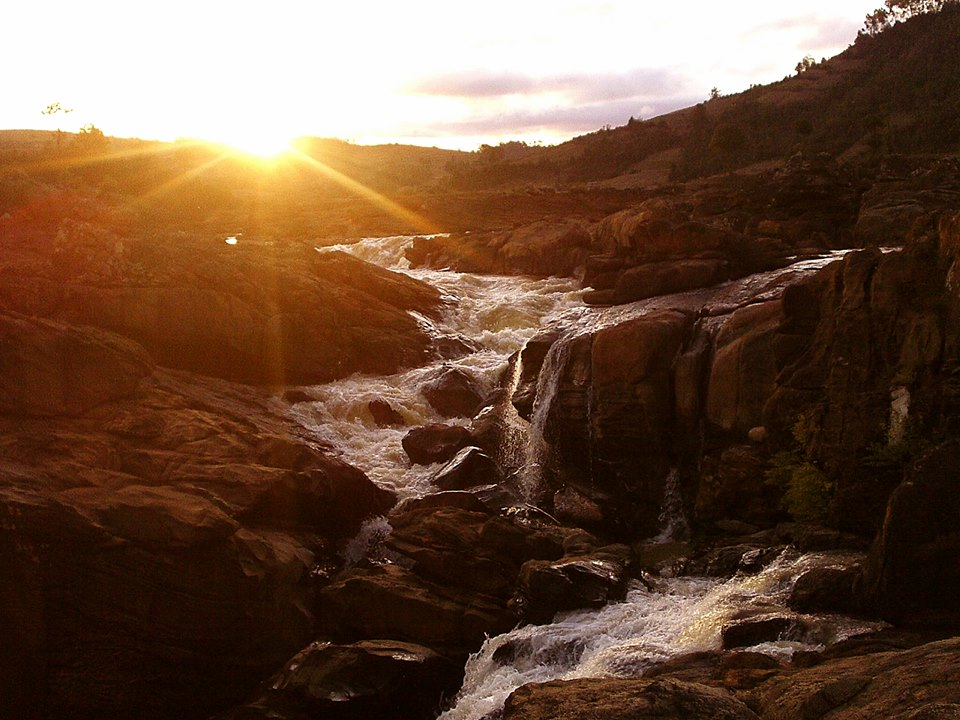
- The Onive near Tsinjoarivo

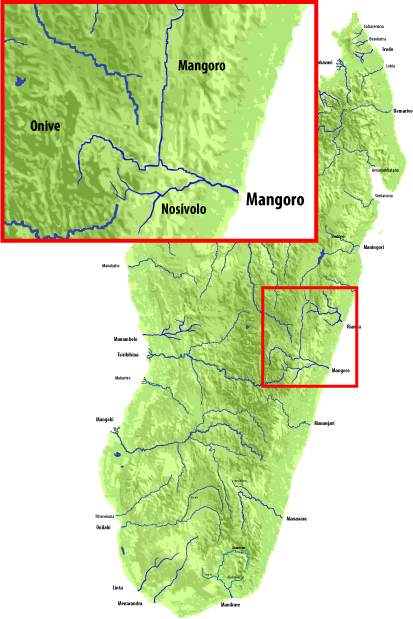
- Onive River

Location
- Country: Madagascar

Physical characteristics
- Source
  - location: Antanifotsy
- Mouth
  - location: Mangoro River
  - coordinates: 19°42′17.639″S 48°2′50.848″E
- Basin size: 4,860 km^{2} (1,880 sq mi)

the Onive & Mangoro river bassin

The Onive River is a river in eastern Madagascar. It flows down from the Ankaratra massif, and is the largest tributary of the Mangoro River.

Notable waterfalls, with a 30m vertical drop, are located southwest of the village of Tsinjoarivo.
