= Bemanevika =

- Location in Madagascar
- Coordinates: 14°8′S 50°07′E
- Country: Madagascar
- Region: Sava
- District: Sambava

Population (2001)
  - Total: 13,000
- Time zone: UTC3 (EAT)
- Postal code: 208

Bemanevika is a town and commune (Malagasy: kaominina) in northern Madagascar. It belongs to the district of Sambava, which is a part of Sava Region. The population of the commune was estimated to be approximately 13,000 in 2001 commune census.

Primary and junior level secondary education are available in town. The majority 95% of the population in the commune are farmers. The most important crop is vanilla, while other important products are coffee, coconut and rice. Industry and services provide employment for 2% and 1% of the population, respectively. Additionally fishing employs 2% of the population.

The Lake Matsaborimena near Bemanevika is the only known wild hosting site of the Madagascar pochard (Aythya innotata).

== Geography ==
It is situated on the banks of the Bemarivo River and the Provincial road 202D.
