= Antanifotsy =

Antanifotsy Faratsiho
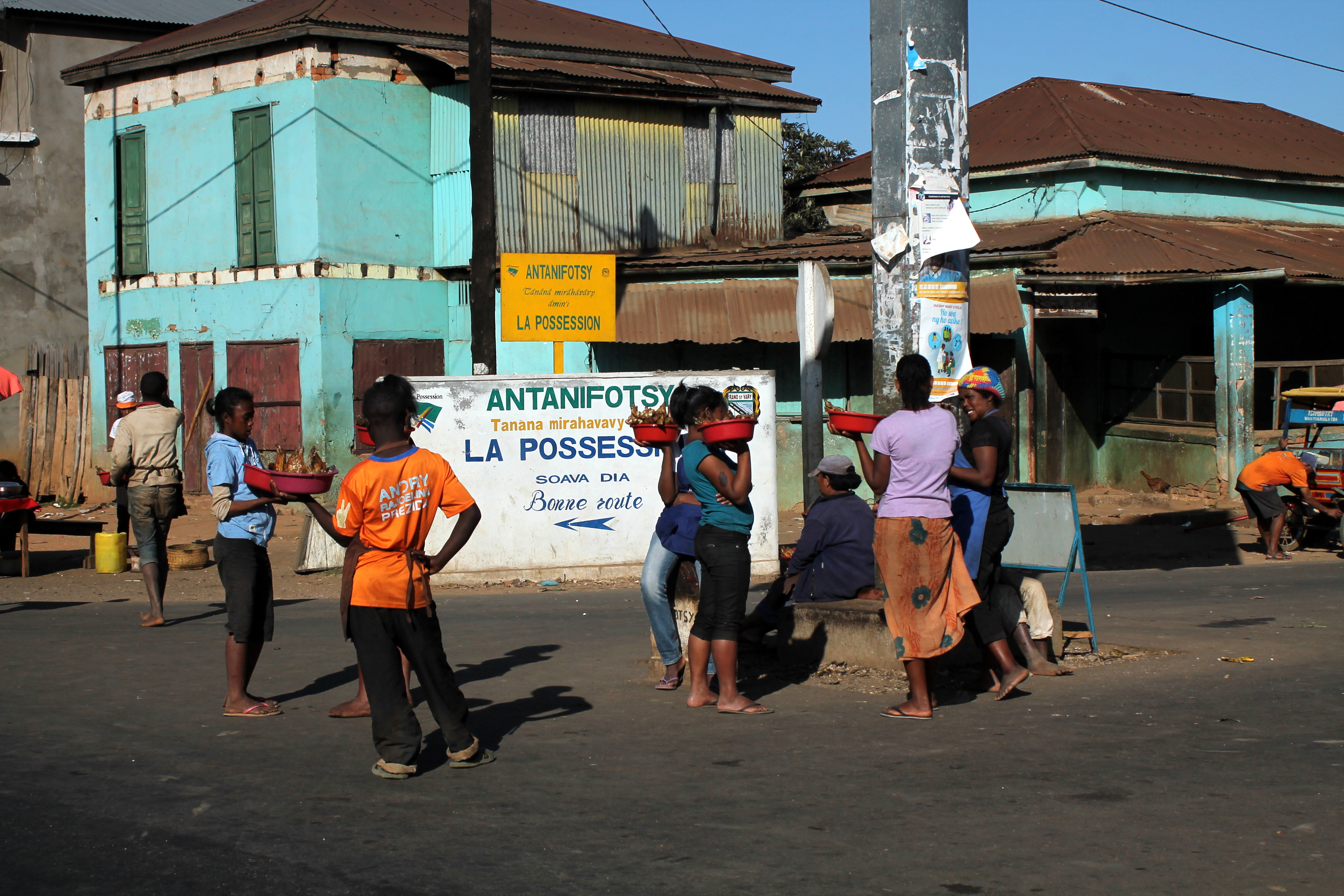
- Antanifotsy

- Location in Madagascar
- Country: Madagascar
- Region: Vakinankaratra
- District: Antanifotsy District

Government
  - Mayor: Lova Rajaona

Area
  - Total: 251.59 km^{2} (97.14 sq mi)

Population (2018)
  - Total: 54,448
- Census
- Postal code: 109
- Climate: Cwb

Antanifotsy (also Antanifotsy Gara) is an urban municipality and a district located in Vakinankaratra Region in Madagascar. It has a population of 54,448 in 2018. The city is at 112 km from Antananarivo and at 60 km to Antsirabe. The municipality is 3 km off the RN7 that passes at Ilempona Gara, at the entrance of Antanifotsy. This is also a railway station on the Antananarivo - Antsirabe line.

The municipality of Antanifotsy is composed by 47 Fokontany (villages) that are: Ambalavao, Ambatoharanana, Ambatolampy, Ambatomaintikely, Ambatomiankina nord, Ambatovaventy Est, Ambatovaventy Oeust, Ambodiriana Est, Ambohijanaka, Ambohitrimanjaka, Amboniandrefana, Andohafarihy, Andohariana, Andohavary II, Andranomalaza, Andrefaniala, Andriantsilahy, Angavo Est, Ankararana, Anondrilahy, Anosimboahangy, Antanambao, Antanetilava, Antanety, Antanety Nord, Antanifotsy, Antanikatsaka, Antemotra, Antobiniaro, Antsahamaina, Antsahondra Est, Antsenakely, Bemasoandro, Bepaiso, Fierenana, Mahalavolona, Mahatsinjo centre, Morarano Ambatobe, Morarano III, Morarano IV, Morarano Ouest, Sahavato centre, Sahavato Haut, Sahavato Ouest, Saonjorano, Tokotanitsara and Tsarafara.)

== Rivers ==
The springs of the Onive River are in this municipality.

== Twin cities ==
- (France) La Possession, Réunion, (since 1995)
