= Ivohibe =

- District
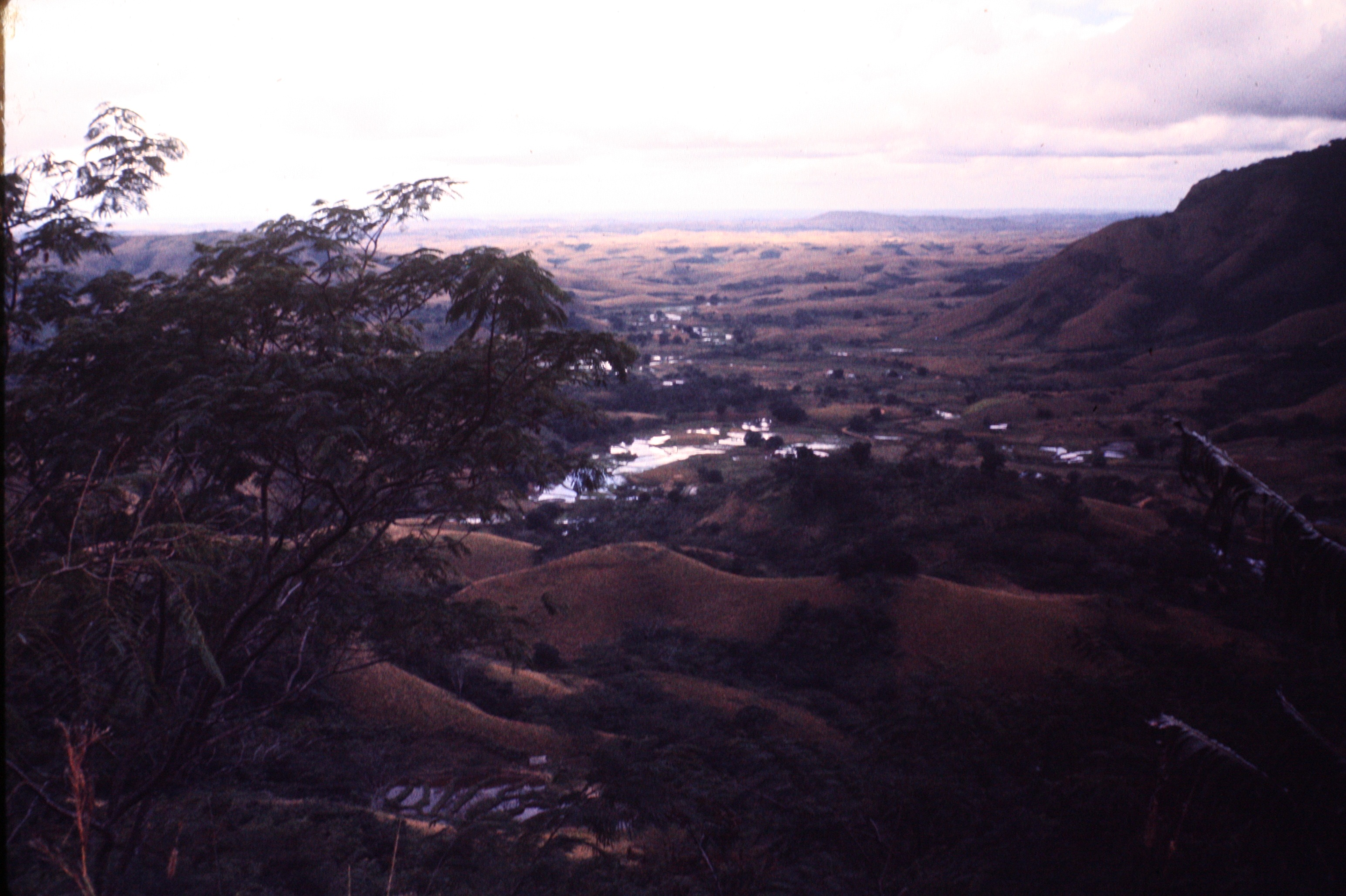
- Ivohibe

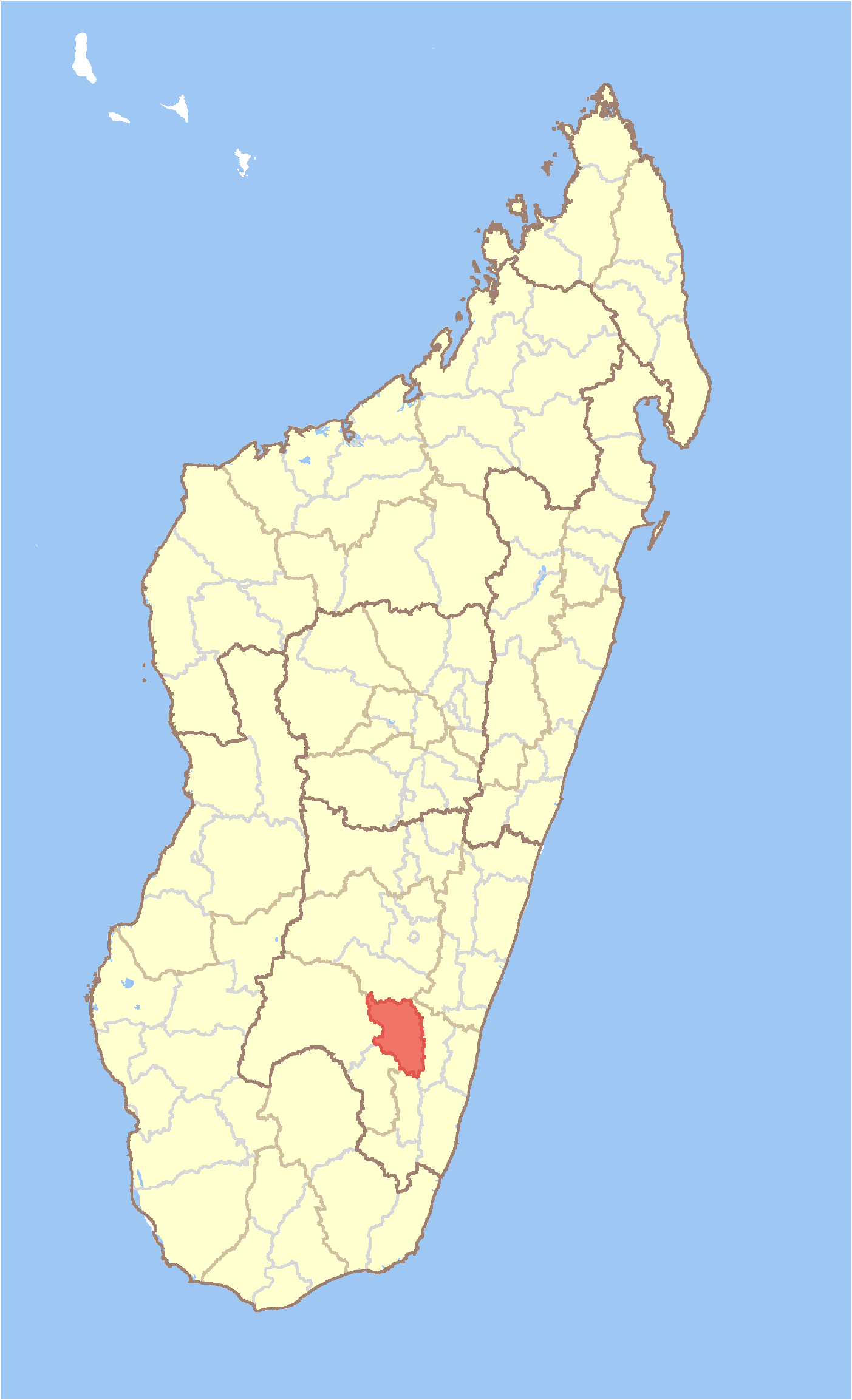
- Location in Madagascar
- Coordinates: 22°21′S 45°49′E
- Country: Madagascar
- Region: Ihorombe

Area
  - Total: 4,119 km^{2} (1,590 sq mi)

Population (2018)Census
  - Total: 22,290
- Time zone: UTC3 (EAT)
- Postal code: 315

Ivohibe is a hilly town in Ihorombe Region in central Madagascar.

It is connected with Ihosy (110 km) in the west, and Farafangana (162 km) in the east by the largely unpaved Route nationale 27.

== See also ==
Pic d'Ivohibe Reserve and the Andringitra National Park that are nearby.
