= Route nationale 27 (Madagascar) =

Road in Madagascar

Location
- Country: Madagascar

Highway system
- Roads in Madagascar

Route nationale 27 (RN 27) is a secondary highway in Madagascar of 275 km, running from Ihosy to Farafangana. It crosses the regions of Ihorombe and Atsimo-Atsinanana.

== Selected locations on route ==
(west to east)

- Ihosy - intersection with Route nationale 7
- Ivohibe (110 km)
  - Pic d'Ivohibe Reserve
  - Forrests of Fandriana-Vondrozo
- Vondrozo (206 km)
- Farafangana (272 km) - intersection with Route nationale 12

== See also ==
- List of roads in Madagascar
- Transport in Madagascar
