= Pic d'Ivohibe Reserve =

Wildlife reserve in Madagascar

- Ivohibe Special Reserve
- IUCN category IV (habitat/species management area)
- Location within Madagascar
- Location: Ihorombe, Madagascar
- Nearest city: Ivohibe
- Coordinates: 22°30′S 46°59′E
- Area: 148.15 km^{2} (57.20 sq mi)
- Designation: Special reserve
- Created: 1964
- Designated: 1964

Pic d'Ivohibe Reserve is a wildlife reserve of Madagascar. It was created in 1964.

== Geography ==
Ivohibe is in the southern part of the Andringitra Massif, in the region of the Ihorombe. The reserve covers 3 453 ha.

It is situated near the village of Ivohibe, about 110 km from Ihosy by secondary roads.

The rainy season starts on October and lasts until March.

== Species ==
List of lemur species found in Pic d'Ivohibe Reserve
Viewing time	Species
Daytime	Ring-tailed lemur (Lemur catta); Southern lesser bamboo lemur (Hapalemur meridionalis); Red-fronted lemur (Eulemur rufifrons); Red-bellied lemur (Eulemur rubriventer)
Nighttime	Brown mouse lemur (Microcebus rufus); Greater dwarf lemur (Cheirogaleus major); Aye-aye (Daubentonia madagascariensis)

== See also ==
- Andringitra National Park
