= System of Rice Intensification =

Farming methodology

The System of Rice Intensification (SRI) is a farming methodology that aims to increase the yield of rice while using fewer resources and reducing environmental impacts. The method was developed by a French Jesuit Father Henri de Laulanié in Madagascar and built upon decades of agricultural experimentation. SRI focuses on changing the management of plants, soil, water, and nutrients to create a more productive and sustainable system of rice cultivation.

The methodology has been adopted by millions of smallholder farmers around the world, particularly in Asia and Africa. Despite its success, the adoption of SRI has been limited primarily due to a lack of awareness and available training. SRI has been proposed as a prime example of how agroecological approaches to farming can address what The Economist newspaper describes as the impending global crisis in rice.

== History ==
The practices that culminated in SRI began in the 1960s based on Fr. de Laulanie's observations. Principles included applying a minimum quantity of water and the individual transplanting of very young seedlings in a square pattern. Father Laulanie began experimenting with a new approach that involved planting single seedlings and with wider spacing, using less water, and providing more nutrients to the plants through organic matter. These methods showed significant improvements in rice yields, and Father Laulanie's approach eventually became known as SRI.

Over the 1990s, a political scientist named Norman Uphoff from Cornell University in the United States learned about SRI and began promoting its adoption in other parts of the world. Uphoff and his colleagues worked with farmers in countries such as China, India, and Indonesia to refine and adapt the SRI approach to local conditions.

Uphoff and his colleagues found that SRI methods could significantly increase rice yields, reduce water use by up to 50%, and decrease seed requirements by up to 90%. SRI gained further recognition in the early 2000s when it was featured in the World Bank's World Development Report 2008: Agriculture for Development, which highlighted the potential of SRI to increase rice yields and reduce poverty in rural areas.

Since then, SRI has been adopted by millions of farmers in more than 50 countries around the world with particularly high levels of adoption in Asia and Africa. In India, for example, SRI has been widely adopted by smallholder farmers and has helped to improve rice productivity and increase farmers' incomes.

== Features ==
The components of the System of Rice Intensification (SRI) have been developed and refined through years of research and experimentation by farmers and scientists in different parts of the world.

As it is a methodology SRI has general principles for what it is, but they are fluid. Instead, these principles can be tailored to the situation-specific circumstances individuals find themselves. The four primarily agreed-upon principles of SRI are:

- Planting younger seedlings: This is because young seedlings have more potential for growth and resilience than older ones. It has been found that planting 8-12 day-old seedlings leads to better establishment, higher yields, and reduced pest and disease incidence.
- Careful planting of single seedlings in wider spaces: This is done to avoid transplant shock, which can be a major stress factor for rice plants. Studies have shown that careful handling of seedlings during transplanting can significantly improve yield and reduce seedling mortality. Furthermore wider spacing reduces competition amongst the plants letting each plant access sufficient nutrients, water, and sunlight. Studies have shown that grid planting can lead to higher yields and improved resource-use efficiency.
- Organic fertilizers: The use of organic matter as a soil amendment is a key feature of SRI, as it helps to improve soil health and fertility over the long term. Studies have shown that SRI can achieve high yields with minimal or no use of synthetic chemical fertilizers, while reducing greenhouse gas emissions and further improving soil quality.
- Reduced water consumption: This is because rice plants do not require continuously flooded conditions to grow, and that water savings can be achieved without compromising yields. Studies have shown that SRI can reduce water use by 25-50% compared to conventional rice farming, while maintaining or increasing yields.

All of these features are adjustable depending on the circumstances of farmers, but together they have a significant cumulative effect on rice production and environmental sustainability.

SRI is also practiced with varying degrees of mechanisation to reduce the labour requirements and make the most of its land-intensive methods. Some of these are machines are complex, others are simple hand-drawn machines, but all can expedite tasks such as direct seeding, seedling transplanting, paddy field weeding, and rice harvesting.

Mechanisation remains an ongoing process, with challenges such as the limited availability of seeders capable of planting days-old rice seedlings without causing damage to their root systems.

SRI has also proven to be highly synergistic with other agricultural management methods such as Conservation Agriculture (CA) to further reduce the negative side effects of rice cultivation while improving the resilience of rice crops in the face of climate change. Several countries have already begun implementing this combination of agricultural methods such as Pakistan, the USA, and China.

Both ideas were combined in 2010, as highly mechanised SRI was deployed along with conservation agriculture in the Punjab province of Pakistan in 2010. Compared to conventional rice cultivation methods used in the country at the time the combined approach reduced the amount of labour and water required for the harvest by 70% while the resulting grain yield was on average 12T ha−1 about three times the usual yield in the region.

Beyond rice, SRI has been adapted successfully to other crops such as wheat and finger millet in multiple countries. This broader application has been termed the System of Crop Intensification (SCI), thereby differentiating them from traditional SRI practises while demonstrating the expansive applications of the methodology.

== Impacts ==
SRI has demonstrated that it has a significant impact on the productivity of rice, its cost to farmers and the environmental footprint of rice farming. Due to environmental, economic and other factors, the exact impacts of SRI can vary from country to country.

For farmers most importantly SRI farming has consistently produced crop yields, often to an extremely significant degree. A study in India reported that SRI practices resulted in a yield increase of 41% compared to conventional practices. The Food and Agriculture Organization of the United Nations (FAO) found similar effects on production. For example, in Cambodia they found that farms that introduced SRI practices were producing double the amount of rice per paddy.

Furthermore, SRI practices reduced the amount of inputs farmers needed to use in order to achieve beneficial results. Groups like the FAO have found that the cost to farmers decreases due to fewer seeds, pesticides, fertilisers and water being used, a fact attested to in other studies.

=== Environmental benefits ===
SRI requires 25-50% less water than conventional rice farming methods, due to alternate wetting and drying (AWD) of the fields rather than flooding. This can lead to significant water savings in areas facing water scarcity or where water-intensive rice farming is a strain on resources.

As a result of not flooding the fields SRI then reduces the amount of green house gasses emitted by rice farming. Conventional rice farming with flooded fields is an ideal environment for anaerobic soil organisms to flourish in the soil, these feed on detritus like rice straw residue and produce methane, while overuse of nitrous-based fertilizers lead to nitrous oxide being emitted from the soil. Its thanks to these practises that rice farming produces 1.5% of the world's green house gas emissions according to the World Resources Institute. An examination published in the journal Agronomy analysed the impact of multiple rice cultivation practises on greenhouse gas (GHG) emissions. The study found that compared to conventional methods Alternate Wetting and Drying (AWD) on average reduced GHG emissions by −33% per kg−1 rice and emissions by 35% ha−1 while SRI reduced emissions by −47% per kg−1 rice and −26% ha−1.

SRI's non-flooding practices, along with organic soil management, can reduce methane emissions by up to 50% compared to conventional methods, which significantly offsets the environmental impact of rice farming.

SRI practices help to improve and restore soil health. This is because active soil aeration, organic fertilization, and mulching add additional soil organic matter, reduce soil erosion, and improve nutrient cycling, which help to better the soil structure and its fertility, reinforcing SRI's previous benefits of higher crop yields and lower fertilizer requirements. SRI also protects the growth of a wider variety of rice strains and encourages the growth of a wider range of plants and insects in and around rice fields. This can provide habitat for beneficial insects, pollinators, and birds, which can help to improve ecosystem health and biodiversity, while hardening rice production against environmental changes that monoculture agriculture can be vulnerable to.

== Spread ==
The System of Rice Intensification (SRI) has spread rapidly in recent years, with millions of farmers adopting the approach in more than 50 countries around the world. The spread of SRI has been driven by a range of factors, including its potential to increase yields, reduce input costs, and improve sustainability, which has motivated farmer uptake.

One of the key drivers of the spread of SRI has been the work of non-governmental organizations (NGOs) and international development agencies, who have played a significant role in promoting and disseminating the approach. NGOs such as the Association Tefy Saina in Madagascar and the Cornell International Institute for Food, Agriculture and Development (CIIFAD) have been instrumental in developing and promoting SRI, while agencies such as the United Nations Development Programme (UNDP), the United States Agency for International Development (USAID) International Fund for Agricultural Development (IFAD) the World Bank and the Food and Agriculture Organization of the United Nations (FAO) have supported its adoption in a range of countries.

Another important factor in the spread of SRI has been the success of early adopters, who have demonstrated the benefits of the approach to other farmers in their communities. In many cases, farmers who have adopted SRI have been able to achieve significant increases in yields and reductions in input costs, which has led to widespread interest in the approach.

The spread of SRI has also been facilitated by the development of networks and partnerships between farmers, researchers, NGOs, and other stakeholders. These networks have played a key role in disseminating information about SRI and supporting its implementation, as well as in facilitating the exchange of knowledge and best practices. For example, SRI's early spread in India can be partially attributed to the smart communication strategies by its proponents in which several newspapers in India disproportionately provided coverage on SRI and effective coalition building among several national and international organisations.

Despite its rapid spread, SRI still faces significant challenges in terms of adoption and scalability, particularly in areas with limited access to resources, training, and support. However, ongoing research and innovation are helping to address some of these challenges and improve the effectiveness and sustainability of the approach and it is being used by an increasing number of people. Project Drawdown estimates that SRI is currently practiced on 6.7 million hectares which could to 40.21–52.00 million hectares by 2050.

== Countries ==
This is an incomplete list of countries that have implemented SRI and how they have done so.

- Madagascar: SRI for the longest period in Madagascar, as it was where the technique originated. The effort was started by the Association Tefy Saina (ATS) which was in 1990 by Fr Henri de Laulanié and his associates, to continue his mission of helping rural Madagascar. They were aided in this effort by the government of Madagascar, as the Ministry of Agriculture collaborated with various interested parties such as Cornell University to research and promote SRI and then integrate it into national agricultural strategies. According to preliminary studies SRI was able to produce a staggering increase in rice production. For example, a study in 2002 found that during wet season, the Madagascar government’s previous recommended growing system SRA (système de riziculture améliorée), averaged a production of 2.45T/Ha, while example SRI plots averaged 4.38t/Ha. Implementing SRI in Madagascar has been government policy since then with continual expansions ongoing with highly positive results in rice growing regions.
- India: As one of the world’s largest rice producing nations SRI has been widely adopted in India. Much like in Madagascar, local NGOs like the Tata trust, worked with news papers, and academics to encourage SRI’s initial expansion into the nation. Now SRI has been implemented in many of India’s states and is considered one of the governments best agricultural practises, with a section dedicated to it on Vikaspedia, the Indian Government’s online information guide. Due to the scale of India how it has been implemented has varied across different states.
- Odisha, India: SRI has been successfully implemented in Odisha to improve rice production and alleviate poverty. Small-scale farmers in the Mayurbhanj district embraced SRI, witnessing a yield increase of 54% while reducing water usage by 34%.
- Bihar, India: In Bihar, SRI adoption has been instrumental in achieving higher rice yields and reducing production costs. A study conducted in the Bhagalpur district reported a yield increase of 47% with SRI, accompanied by a 35% reduction in seed requirements.
- Andhra Pradesh, India: SRI practices have been successfully implemented in Andhra Pradesh, contributing to sustainable agriculture and improved livelihoods. Farmers in the Nellore district embraced SRI, resulting in a 29% increase in rice yields along with water savings of up to 40%.
- Mali: In Mali, SRI techniques have been adopted to enhance rice productivity and promote sustainable agriculture. The Africa Rice Center (AfricaRice) collaborated with local partners to introduce SRI practices in the Office du Niger irrigation scheme. Through the "More Rice for Africa" initiative, SRI was implemented, resulting in significant yield increases. Farmers in the region achieved average yields of 8 tons per hectare, compared to the conventional average of 4 tons per hectare.
- Senegal: SRI has been introduced in Senegal to address challenges related to low rice productivity and water scarcity. The National Center of Agronomic Research (CNRA) and other stakeholders have collaborated to promote SRI practices. Farmers in the Senegal River Valley have adopted SRI, leading to increased rice yields, improved water management, and enhanced farmer livelihoods.

== Criticisms ==
While the System of Rice Intensification (SRI) has been lauded for its potential to improve rice yields while reducing input costs and environmental impacts, there have been criticisms of the approach as well.

Firstly that it is overly labour intensive. SRI often involves more frequent weeding, transplanting of younger seedlings, and other manual labor tasks, which can be challenging for farmers with limited resources and labor availability, at least when implementation begins. However, an Anglo-Indian study of SRI in Andhra Pradesh, India found that overall there was a substantial reduction in labor requirement alongside significant benefits for farmers and the environment once farmers had time to optimise their implementation of SRI.

Then there is the potential problem that it is too knowledge-intensive as SRI requires a higher level of technical knowledge and skill than traditional methods of rice cultivation, which can be a barrier for some farmers. For example, SRI involves precise plant spacing, water management, and nutrient application, which may require training and support for successful implementation. This has created further criticism that it may not be able to operate on a large enough scale to compared to other methods of conventional rice production.

The risk of yield variability is cited as a critique as SRI methods can be more susceptible to yield variability than traditional methods of rice cultivation. This is because SRI involves more precise plant spacing and nutrient management, which can be affected by weather conditions and other factors that are difficult to control.

And most commonly critics cited that there was limited evidence of SRI's impact with some citing that it was no better than any other method of rice production. However, these early criticisms have mostly faded, as continual study has shown that SRI consistently increases rice production. Furthermore several of the studies that asserted SRI did not increase rice production either used secondary data or examined small data sets of SRI where it was deliberately implemented incorrectly to generate those results.

While many of criticisms of SRI are valid to some degree, there is also evidence to suggest that many of these challenges can be addressed with appropriate training, support, and adaptation of the approach to local conditions, which numerous international and national agencies are engaged in.

Several criticisms such as a lack of evidence to prove claims that SRI could improve rice yields or reduce GHG emissions were addressed in a 2024 special issue of Agronomy.

One paper undertook a literature review of the effects SRI has upon GHG emissions, demonstrating decades of evidence to the claims.

Another study in the paper undergone by the Indian Institute of Rice Cultivation (ICAR) compared SRI to other methods of rice cultivation in India such as conventional transplanting and flooding of fields, over a period of six years. Their findings disproved early critics by demonstrating that even basic SRI resulted in significantly higher average grain yields compared to CTF, 6.23–6.47T ha−1, compared to 5.36–5.59 T ha−1. The study found consistent yield improvements with SRI compared to conventional methods over the course of the study.

The special issue also examines some of the problems with SRI that research has identified, such as reductions in methane emissions being partially offset by rises in the emission of nitrous oxide and carbon dioxide in a small number of cases. Furthermore, the researchers suggest areas to further research SRI's unexplored capabilities such as its potential for carbon sequestration.

== Gallery ==
SRI farming in Chhattisgarh, India:

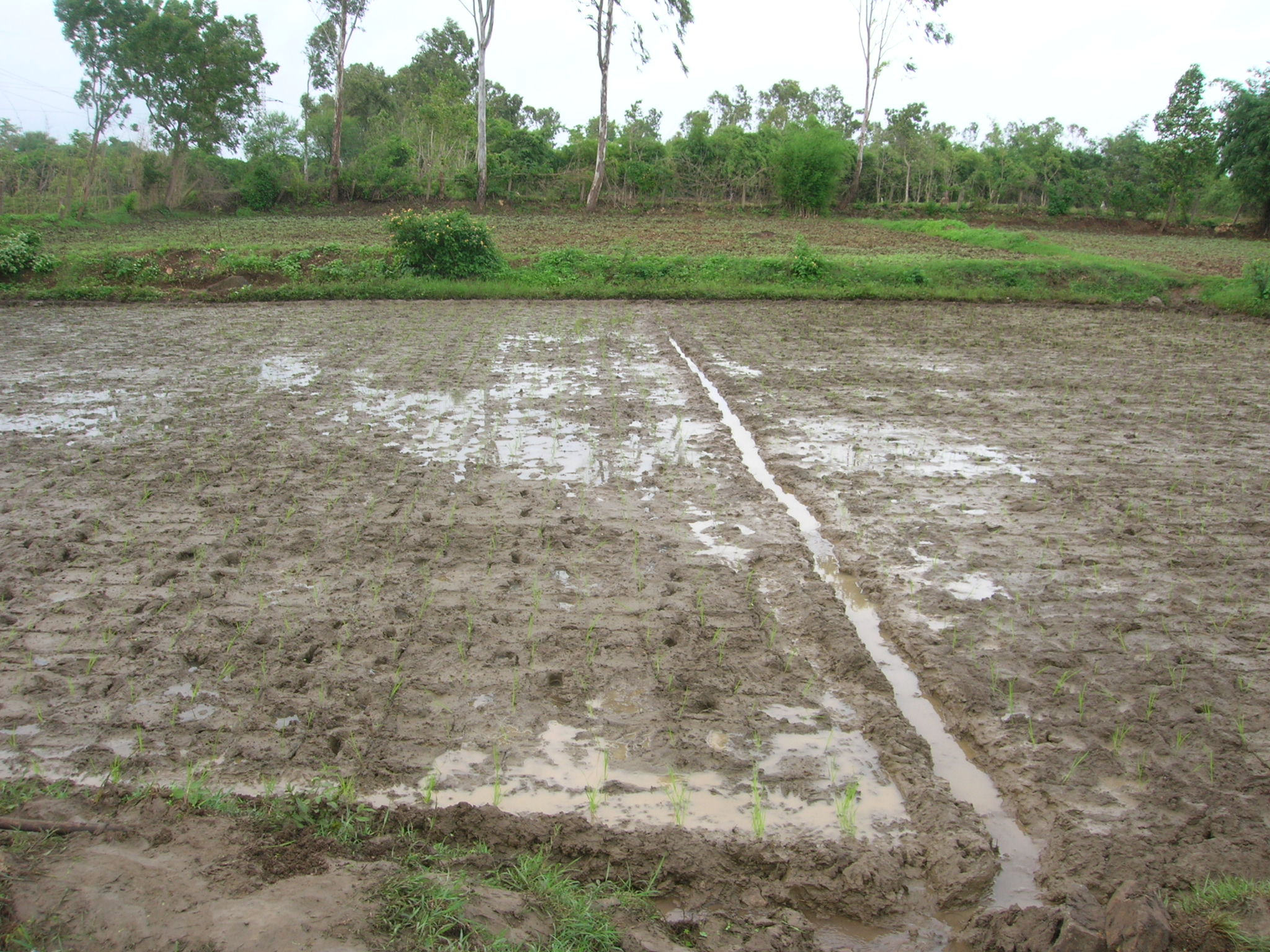
Planted field

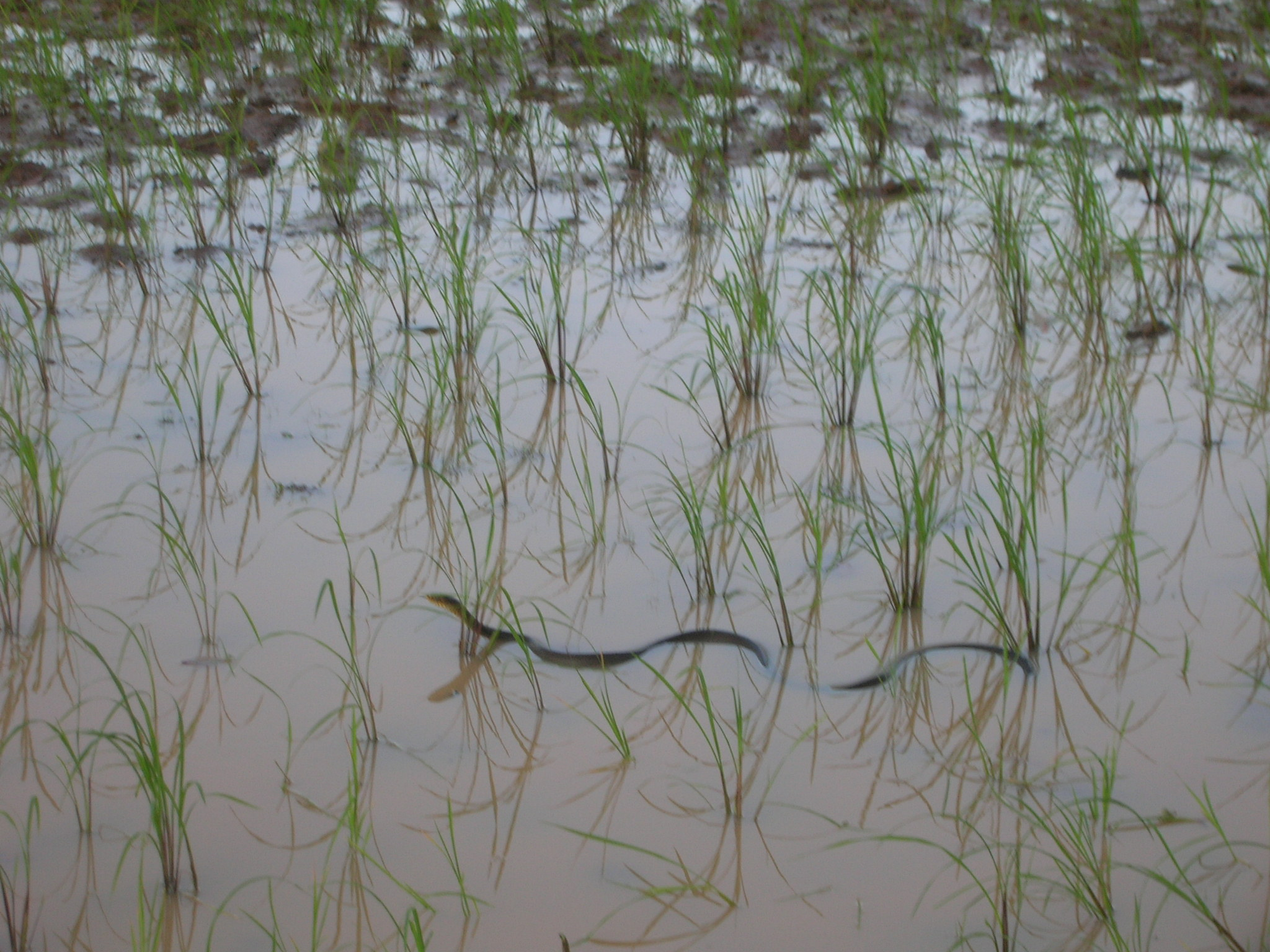
Rice field

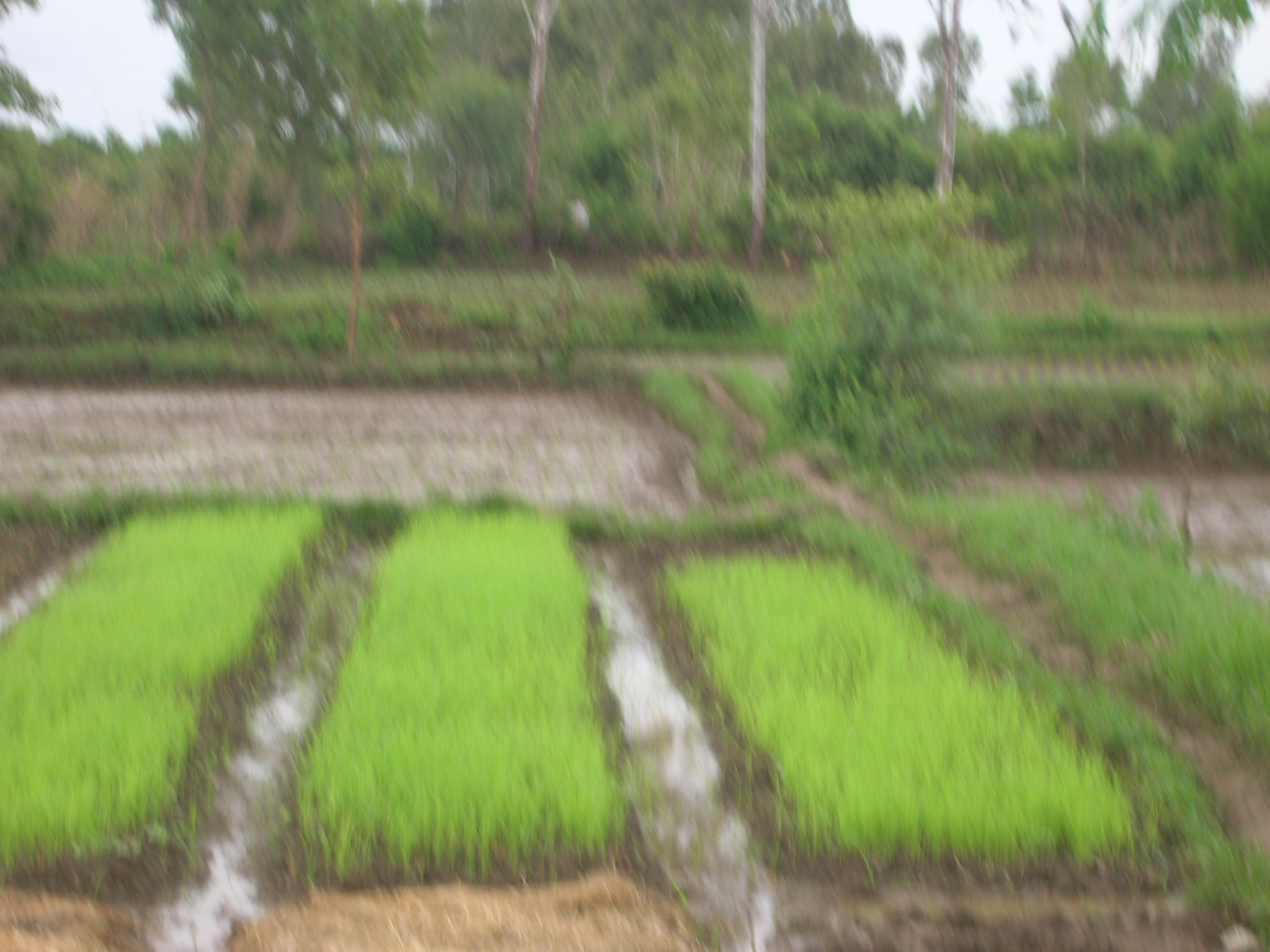
Nursery

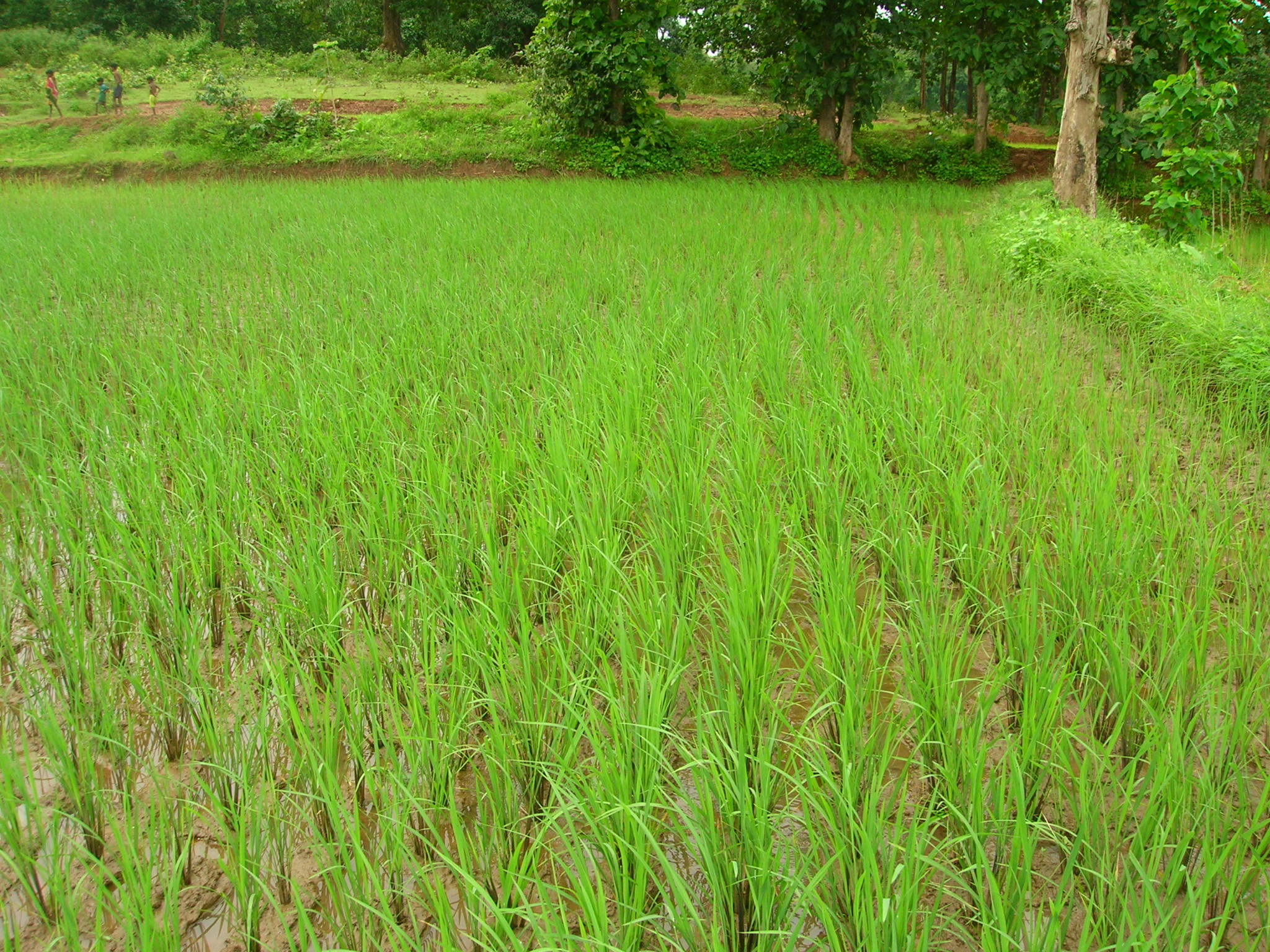
Fields left almost dry

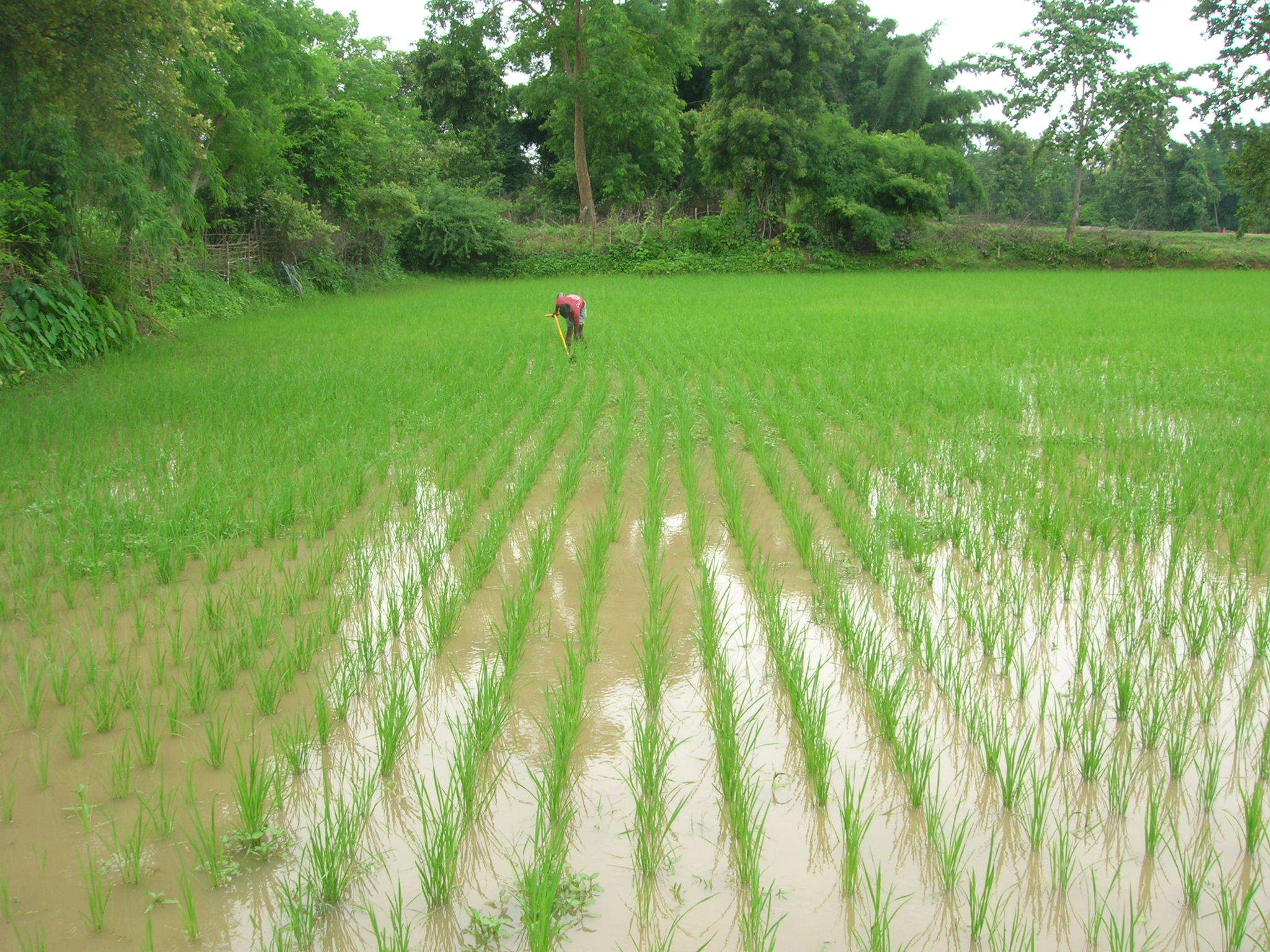
SRI field

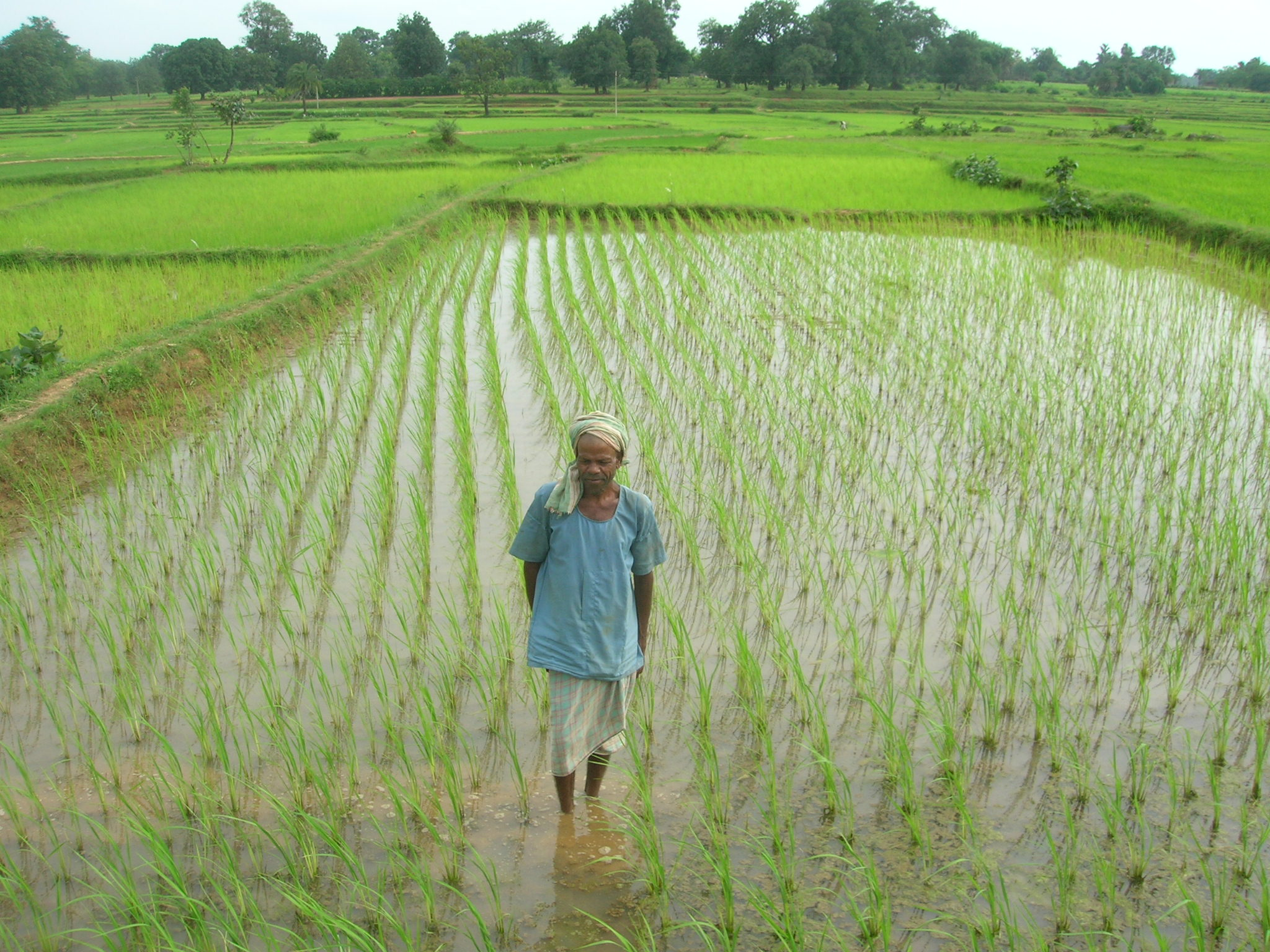
Farmer

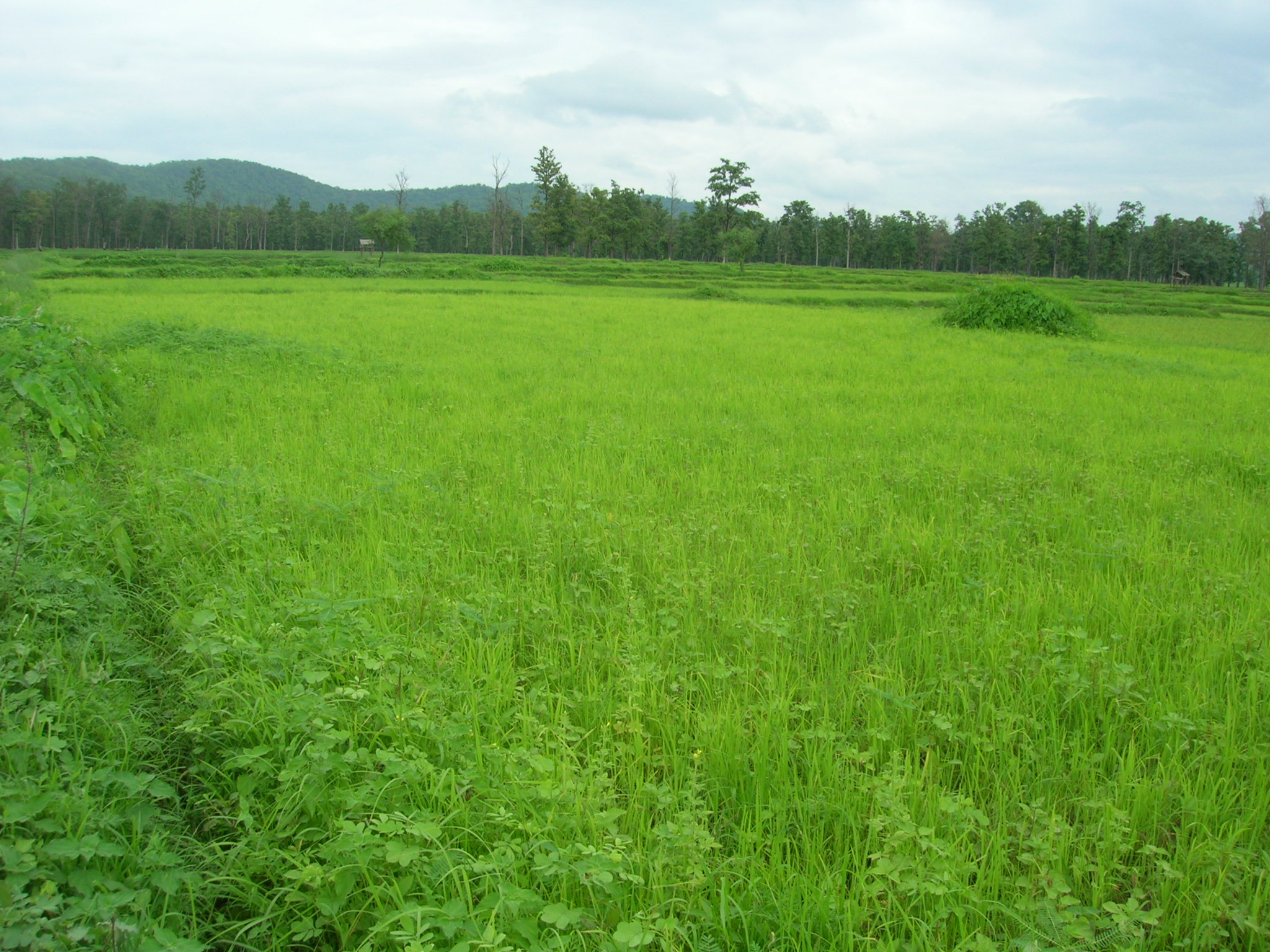
Crop with weeds

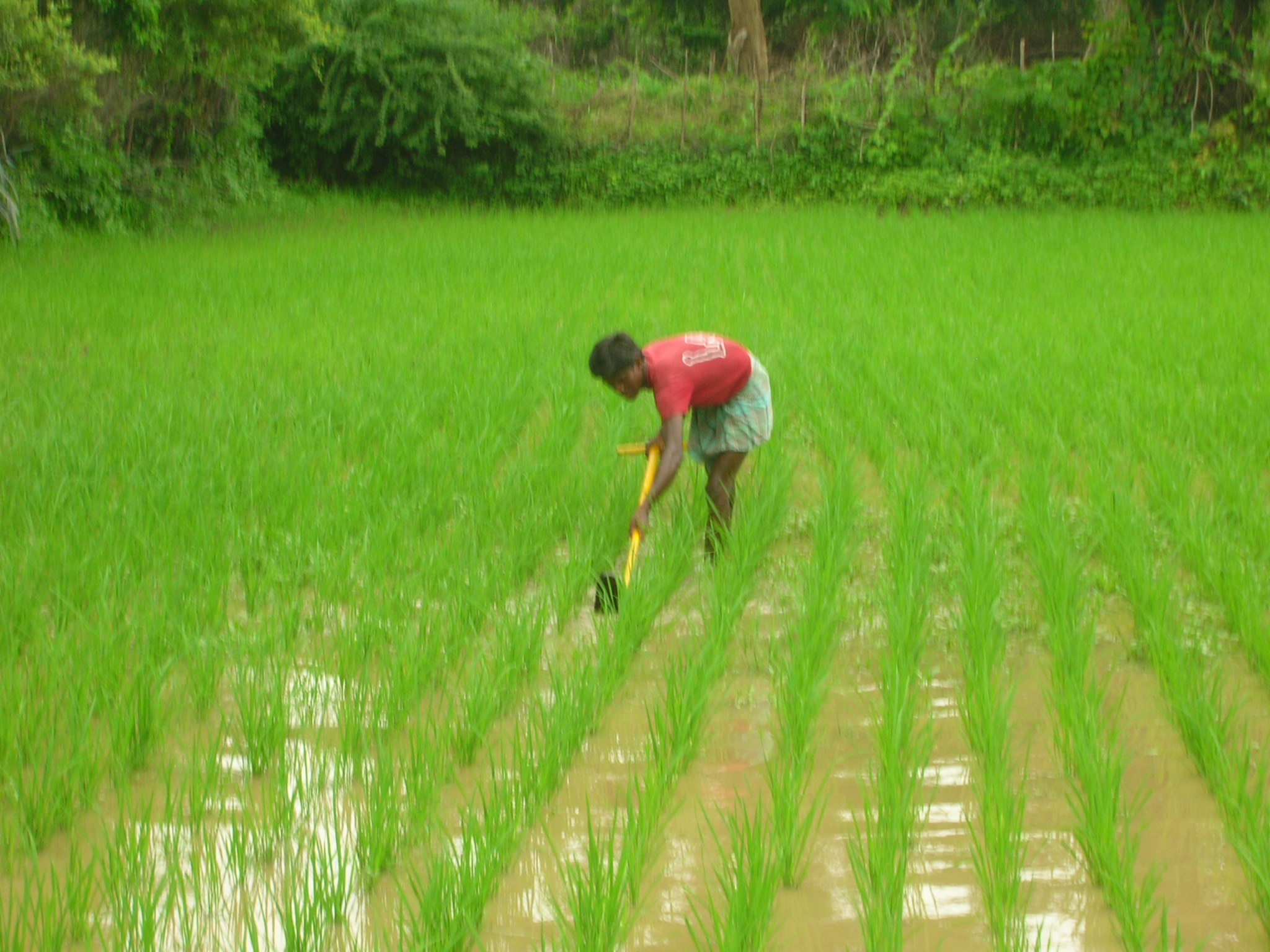
Weeding

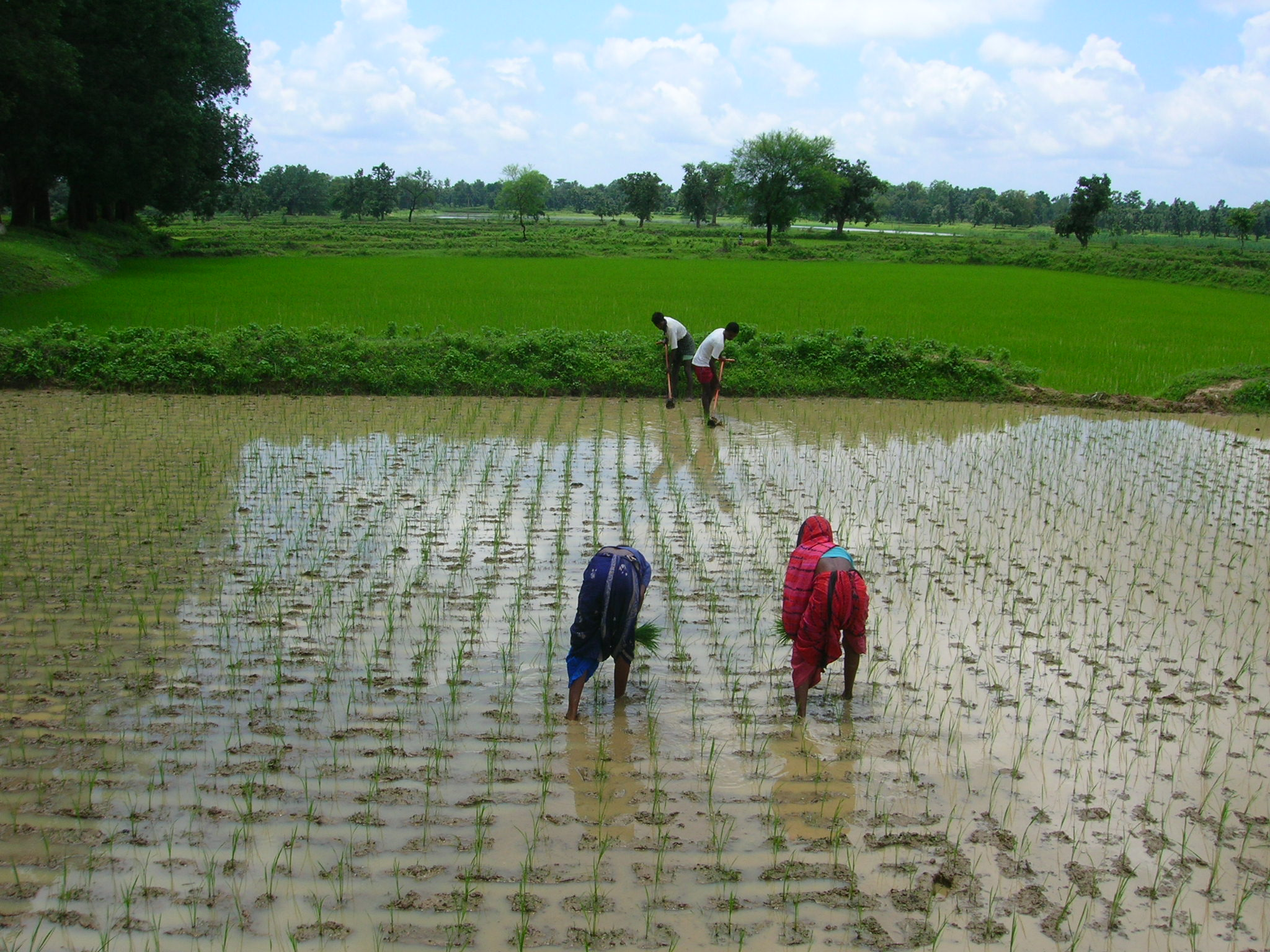
Weeding

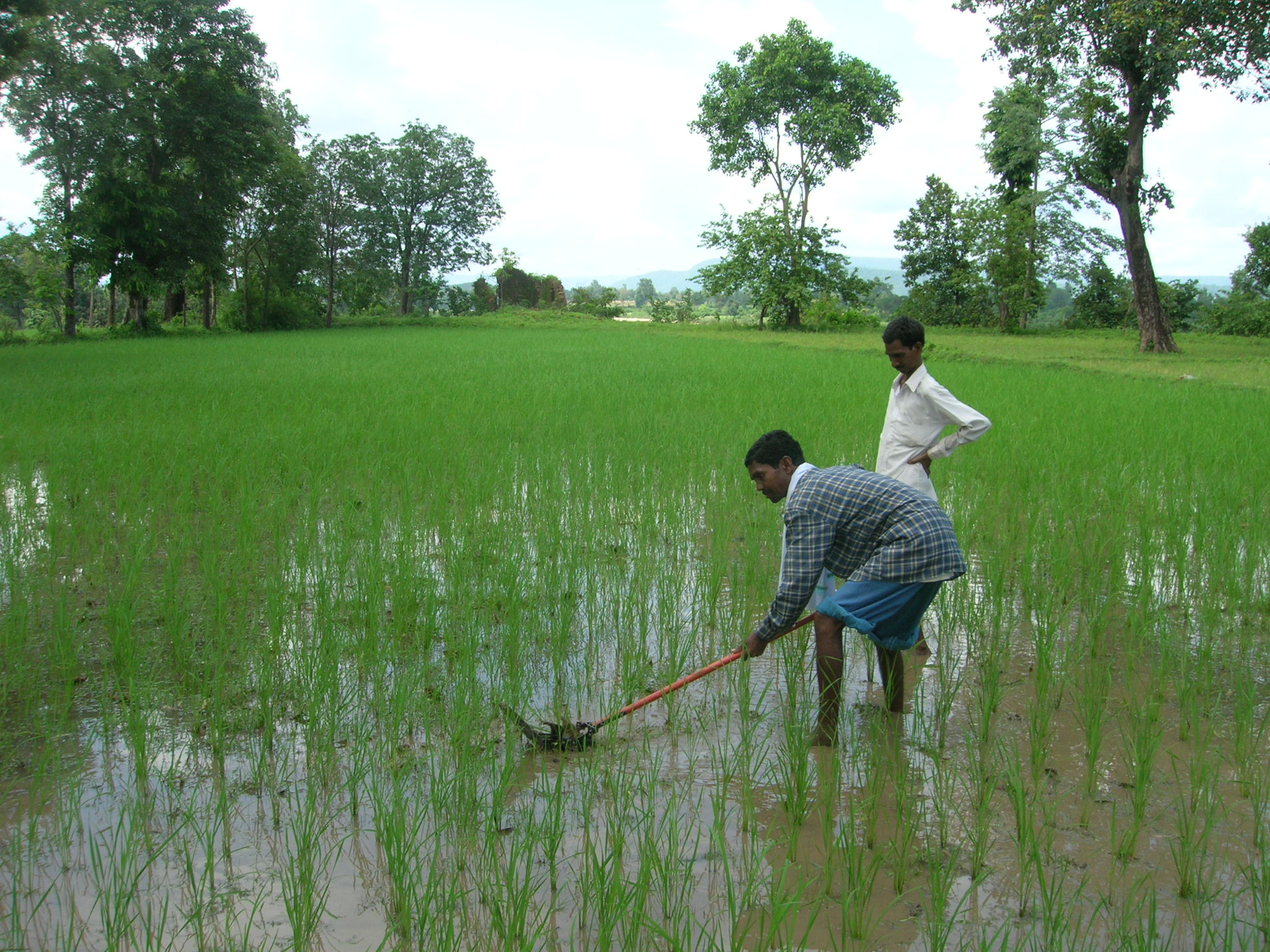
Weeding

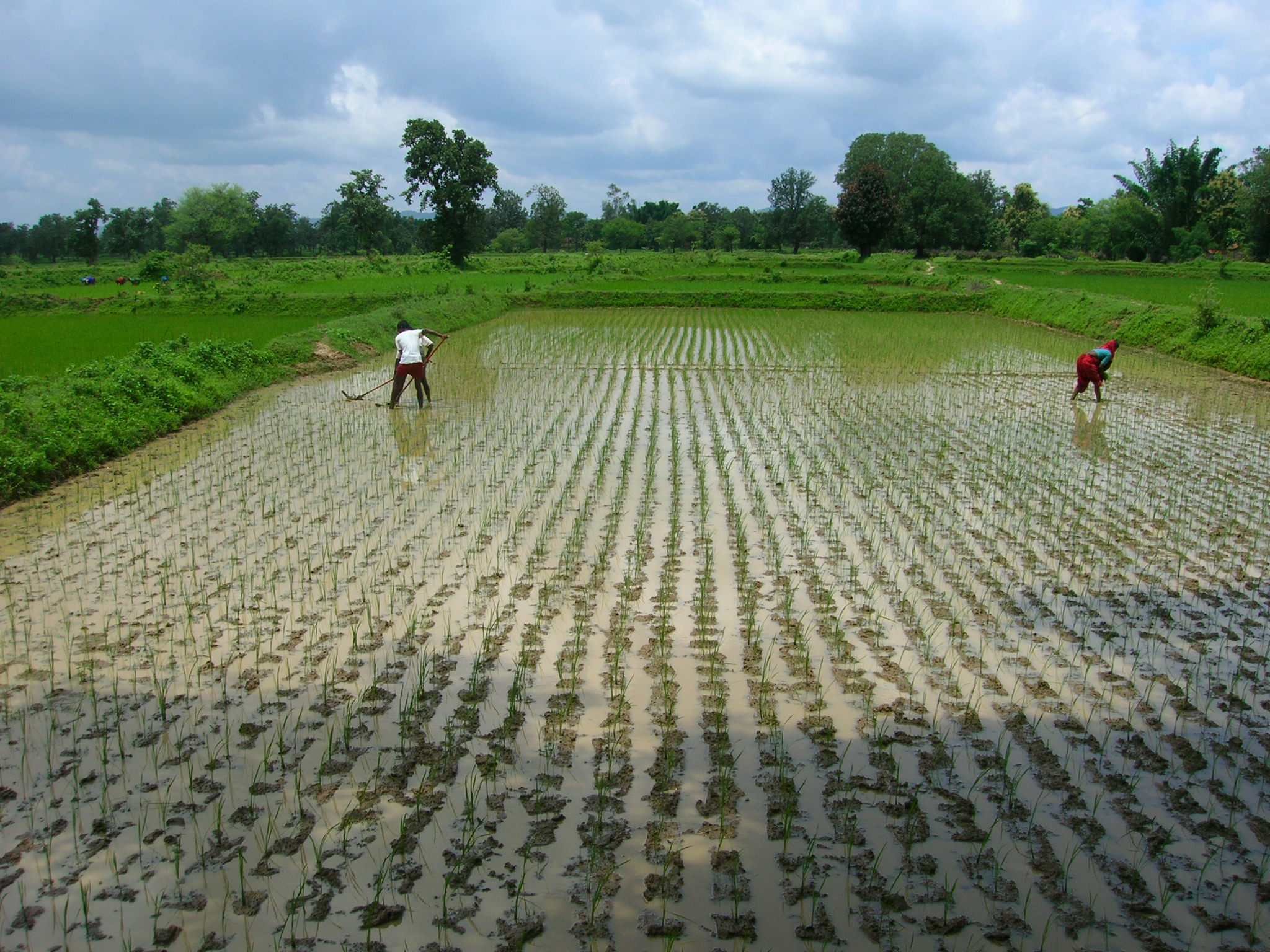
Weeding

== See also ==
- Organic farming
- Alternate wetting and drying
- Rice
- Conservation agriculture
- Sustainable Agriculture
- Biodiversity
- Soil health
- Irrigation
- Irrigation management
- Surface irrigation
- Environmental impact of irrigation
- Water Conservation
- Sustainable drainage system
