= Conserving use acreage =

Conserving use acreage is farmland diverted from crop production to an approved cultural practice that prevents erosion or other degradation. Though crops are not produced, conserving use is considered an agricultural use of the land.

In the United States, the United States Department of Agriculture pays some farmers to preserve ecologically significant land. The farmers may be asked to plant native species to aid ecological recovery.

== See also ==
- Conservation Reserve Program
- Conservation easement
- Soil conservation
- Conservation agriculture
