= Tani E. Barlow =

American historian

Tani Barlow
- Born: 1941 (age 84–85)
- Title: George and Nancy Rupp Professor of Humanities
- Scientific career
- Fields: History, gender studies, China
- Workplaces: Rice University

Tani Barlow is an American historian. She is the George and Nancy Rupp Professor of Humanities at Rice University in Houston, Texas. Formerly, Barlow was a professor of history and women studies at the University of Washington and the University of Missouri-Columbia. She is known for her research on feminism in China.

== Career ==
Barlow was professor of history and women studies at the University of Washington. She researched modern China with a particular focus on feminism in China. She received the Best New Journal Award from the Council of Editors of Learned Journals in 1995 for her journal Positions: Asia critique. In 2008, she published a co-edited volume entitled The Modern Girl around the World: Consumption, Modernity, and Globalization on Duke University Press.

She is currently the George and Nancy Rupp Professor of Humanities at Rice University. In 2021, Barlow published In The Event of Women with Duke University Press.

== Selected works ==
- Tani Barlow, In The Event of Women Durham: Duke University Press, 2021.
- Tani Barlow, Madeleine Dong, Uta Poiger, Priti Ramamurthy, Lynn Thomas, and Alys Weinbaum (eds.) The Modern Girl Around the World, Durham: Duke University Press, 2008.
- Tani Barlow (ed.), New Asian Marxisms, Durham: Duke University Press, 1997
- Tani Barlow and Angela Zito, Body, Subject, and Power in China, Chicago: University of Chicago Press, 1994
