= Alternate wetting and drying =

Water management technique in the cultivation of rice

Alternate wetting and drying (AWD) is a water management technique, practiced to cultivate irrigated lowland rice with much less water than the usual system of maintaining continuous standing water in the crop field. It is a method of controlled and intermittent irrigation. A periodic drying and re-flooding irrigation scheduling approach is followed in which the fields are allowed to dry for few days before re-irrigation, without stressing the plants. This method reduces water demand for irrigation and greenhouse gas emissions without reducing crop yields.

== History ==
Drying and flooding practices have been used for several decades as a water-saving measure, but in many cases, farmers were practicing an uncontrolled or unplanned drying and re-flooding method. Farmers were practicing ‘forced’ AWD as early as 2006 in the AMRIS region. Some water management practices and especially keeping non-flooded conditions in the rice field for short intervals are common for about 40% of rice farmers in China and more than 80% rice farmers in North-Western India and in Japan. However, nowadays farmers follow a ‘safe’ AWD in which they maintain the 15-cm subsurface water level threshold for re-flooding. This method has become a recommended practice in water-scarce irrigated rice areas in South and Southeast Asia. In the Philippines, the adoption of safe AWD started in Tarlac Province in 2002 with farmers using deep-well pump systems. The International Rice Research Institute (IRRI) has been promoting alternate wetting and drying as a smart water-saving technology for rice cultivation through national agricultural research and extension in Bangladesh, the Philippines, and Vietnam.

== Implementation and operation ==
AWD is suitable for lowland rice growing areas where soils can be drained in 5-day intervals. The field will be unable to dry during rice season if rainfall exceeds evapotranspiration and seepage. Therefore, AWD is suitable for dry season rice cultivation.

=== Implementation method ===
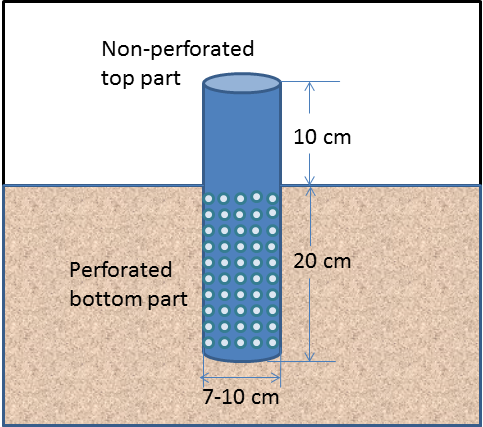
Illustration of alternate wetting and drying method

A water tube/pipe made of PVC is usually used to practice AWD method. The main purpose of the tube is to monitor the water depth. The tube allows measuring water availability in the field below the soil surface. The usual practice is to use a pipe of 7–10 cm diameter and 30 cm long, with perforations in bottom 20 cm. The pipe is installed in such a way that the bottom 20 cm of perforated portion remains below the soil surface and the non-perforated 10 cm above the surface. The perforations permit the water to come inside the tube from the soil, where a scale is used to measure water depth below the soil surface. However, there are variations in preparing the tube/pipe for the implementation of AWD. Some farmers use a bamboo pipe instead of PVC pipe. Some farmers use a 30 cm tube with 15 cm perforated at the bottom.

=== Operation technique ===
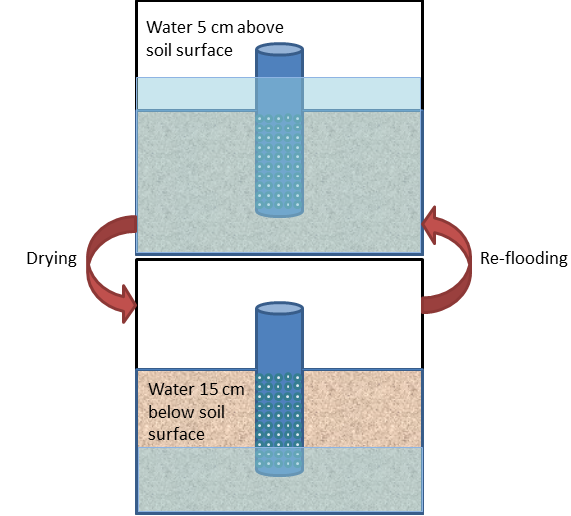
Illustration of AWD operation technique

After the irrigation in the crop field, the water depth gradually decreases because of evapotranspiration, seepage, and percolation. Because of the installed tubes in the field, it is possible to monitor the water depth below the soil surface up to 15–20 cm. When the water level drops 15 cm below the soil surface, irrigation should be applied in the field to re-flood to a depth of 5 cm. During the flowering stage of the rice, the field should be kept flooded. After flowering, during the mid-season and late season (grain filling and ripening stages), the water level is allowed to drop below the soil surface to 15 cm before re-irrigation. To suppress the growth of weeds in the rice field, AWD method should be followed 1–2 weeks after the transplantation. In the case of many weeds in the field, AWD needs to be started after three weeks of transplantation. Usually, the fertilizer recommendations are as same as continuous flooding method. Application of nitrogen fertilizer is preferable on dry soil just before re-irrigation. To ensure a similar dry or wet condition throughout the crop field, which is essential to maintain good yield, it is important to level the rice field properly.

== Advantages and disadvantages ==
=== Advantages ===
AWD method can save water by about 38% without adversely affecting rice yields. This method increases water productivity by 16.9% compared with continuously flood irrigation. High-yielding rice varieties developed for continuously flood irrigation rice system still produce high yield under safe AWD. This method can even increase grain yield because of enhancement in grain-filling rate, root growth and remobilization of carbon reserves from vegetative tissues to grains.

AWD can reduce the cost of irrigation by reducing pumping costs and fuel consumption. This method can also reduce the labor costs by improving field conditions at harvest, allowing mechanical harvest. AWD leads to firmer soil conditions at harvest, which is suitable to operate machines in the field. Therefore, AWD increases net return for farmers.

Several studies also indicate that AWD reduces methane (CH_{4}) emissions. AWD practice reduced seasonal CH_{4} emissions up to 85%. CH_{4} is produced by the anaerobic decomposition of the organic material in the wet/flooded paddy field. Allowing to drop water level below soil surface removes the anaerobic condition for some time until re-flooded and pauses the production of CH_{4} from the rice field for several times and, hence, reduce the total amount of CH_{4} released during the rice growing season. This method has been assumed to reduce CH_{4} emissions by an average of 48% compared to continuous flooding in the 2006 IPCC methodology.

Alternate wetting and moderate soil drying reduce cadmium accumulation in rice grains. AWD can dramatically reduce the concentration of arsenic in harvested rice grains. A variant of AWD such as e-AWD practice can reduce grain arsenic, lead and cadmium levels up to 66, 73 and 33% respectively. This method can also reduce insect pests and diseases. Periodic soil drying may reduce the incidence of fungal diseases.

=== Disadvantages ===
The major disadvantage of AWD method is the increased N_{2}O emissions. Also, rice productivity can reduce by following AWD for non-trained farmers. High weed growth rate in the crop field is a major problem from the farmers' point of view.

== See also ==
- Conservation agriculture
- Environmental impact of irrigation
- Irrigation
- Irrigation management
- Paddy field
- Surface irrigation
- Water conservation
