= Priti Ramamurthy =

American political economist

Priti Ramamurthy is an American political economist. She is currently a professor of Gender, Women, and Sexuality Studies at the University of Washington. Her work focuses upon social reproduction and makes a feminist analysis of commodity chains.

== Career ==
Ramamurthy started her research at 16, when she volunteered for the NGO Mother and Child Healthcare and was sent to a poor village in Andhra Pradesh, India, to make a survey. Her PhD research was on canal irrigation in South India, then she wrote Managing irrigation: Analyzing and improving the performance of bureaucracies with Norman Uphoff and Roy Steiner in 1991. She worked at the Maxwell School of Citizenship and Public Affairs at Syracuse University, then joined the University of Washington in 1998. From 2007 onwards, she was the director of the South Asia Center. She is currently professor of Gender, Women, and Sexuality Studies.

Ramamurthy's work focuses upon social reproduction and makes a feminist analysis of commodity chains. She is a political economist. In 2008, she published a co-edited volume entitled The Modern Girl around the World: Consumption, Modernity, and Globalization on Duke University Press. Ramamurthy was awarded a Fulbright-Nehru Academic & Professional Excellence Award in 2017 which enabled her to study in India for nine months, in partnership with Ambedkar University.

== Selected works ==
- Ramamurthy, Priti (2010). "Why Are Men Doing Floral Sex Work? Gender, Cultural Reproduction, and the Feminization of Agriculture". Signs: Journal of Women in Culture and Society. 35 (2): 397–424. doi:10.1086/605899. S2CID 143589785.
- The Modern Girl around the World Research Group; Dong, Madeleine Yue; Barlow, Tani; Ramamurthy, Priti; Poiger, Uta G.; Thomas, Lynn M.; Weinbaum, Alys Eve (2008). The modern girl around the world: Consumption, modernity, and globalization. Durham, N.C.: Duke University Press. ISBN 978-0-8223-4305-9.
- Ramamurthy, Priti; Steiner, Roy; Uphoff, Norman Thomas (1991). Managing irrigation: Analyzing and improving the performance of bureaucracies. New Delhi: Sage Publications. ISBN 978-0803996663.
