= Norman Uphoff =

American social scientist (born 1940)

Norman Thomas Uphoff (born 1940) is an American social scientist and development professional who is professor emeritus of government and international agriculture at Cornell University. His research has focused on rural development, participatory development, local institutions, irrigation management, social capital, sustainable agriculture, and agroecology. In 1990, Cornell appointed him the first director of its Cornell International Institute for Food, Agriculture and Development (CIIFAD), a position he held for 15 years. From the mid-1990s, he became associated with the System of Rice Intensification (SRI), an agroecological methodology for rice cultivation developed in Madagascar. He subsequently engaged in SRI research and international dissemination and in understanding its efficacy in terms of plant physiology, soil biology, and microbial ecology. In 2015, he and the SRI International Network and Resources Center at Cornell received the inaugural Olam Prize for Innovation in Food Security.

== Early life and career ==
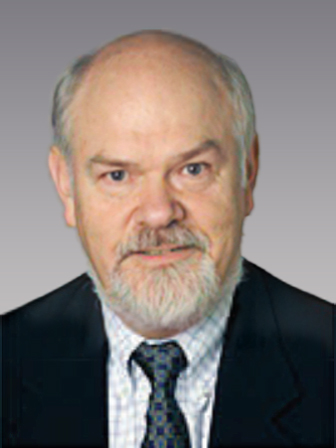
Norman T. Uphoff

Uphoff grew up on a dairy farm near Madison, Wisconsin. He received a bachelor's degree from the University of Minnesota in 1963 and a master’s degree in public and international affairs from Princeton University in 1966. He then studied at the University of California, Berkeley, where he received his PhD in political science in 1970, covering comparative politics, public administration, organization theory, and development economics. While at Berkeley, he wrote two books with his thesis advisor Warren F. Ilchman on “the new political economy” that integrated political, economic, and social relationships into a common framework.

== Academic career ==
In 1970, Uphoff joined the faculty of Cornell University. During the first part of his career there, his research and teaching were broadly on development (political, economic, rural, agricultural) focusing on participatory approaches, local organizations, and irrigation management in countries of the Global South. From 1971 to 1990, he chaired Cornell's Rural Development Committee based in the university's Center for International Studies. His fieldwork during this period focused on Africa and Asia, often with support from the U.S. Agency for International Development (USAID). During the 1980s, he was a member of USAID’s Research Advisory Committee, the South Asia Committee of the U.S. Social Science Research Council, and the Program Committee of the Overseas Development Council in Washington, DC. From 1986 to 1990, he also served as director of Cornell’s interdisciplinary South Asia Program.

In 1990, Uphoff was appointed as the first director of CIIFAD, becoming a professor of international agriculture in the College of Agriculture and Life Sciences and serving also as director of the college’s International Agriculture Program. CIIFAD, established to promote sustainable agricultural and rural development, engaged in collaborative programs in multiple countries. Its work brought together social and agricultural scientists across the university to carry out cross-disciplinary, problem-solving agricultural, rural, and ecological research.

After stepping down from the CIIFAD directorship in 2005, Uphoff joined the core faculty of the Cornell Institute for Public Affairs (CIPA), a program granting Master in Public Affairs degrees. He continued teaching development administration and served as CIPA’s director of graduate studies and then as its director, 2010-14, engaging in teaching, advising and research until 2020, when he fully retired. In 2010 with a gift from Jim Carrey’s Better U Foundation, he set up SRI-Rice at Cornell, the SRI International Network and Resources Center, serving as its senior advisor as an ongoing responsibility.

== Research ==
=== Rural development and participatory development ===
The major theme of Uphoff's initial research was the roles of local institutions and farmer organizations in agricultural and rural development. He examined how communities participate, or could participate, in planning and managing development initiatives rather than functioning solely as recipients or intended beneficiaries of externally-designed projects. His work with Cornell and Sri Lankan colleagues and with farmers on the Gal Oya irrigation scheme in Sri Lanka, under a USAID rehabilitation project, 1980-85, was a focal case study in this research. The process of introducing farmer participation into the management of that scheme was detailed in his book Learning from Gal Oya. In 1987, the Sri Lankan government made participatory management its national policy for all irrigation schemes, accepting the Gal Oya system as its model.

An evaluation of the Gal Oya project by the International Institute for Water Management (IWMI) found that it had achieved a four-fold increase in the amount of rice produced per m^{3} of irrigation water, with a separate evaluation attributing half of this gain to the farmer organizations created under the project; their formation required less than 10% of project expenditure. How this process related to investment in and utilization of social capital was examined by Uphoff with his colleague C.M. Wijayaratna, documenting measurable material benefits from collective social action. This case demonstrated unprecedented cooperation between upstream Sinhalese and downstream Tamil farmers in the equitable and more productive distribution of irrigation water. Other publications during this period addressed farmer participation, local organization and institutions, and irrigation management.

=== System of Rice Intensification ===
After becoming director of CIIFAD, Uphoff's attention shifted toward sustainable agriculture and agroecology, particularly after learning about the System of Rice Intensification (SRI), which he encountered in Madagascar in 1993. SRI methodology developed during the 1970s and 1980s by a French priest, Henri de Laulanié, SJ, evoked more productive and robust plant phenotypes from given rice genotypes by making changes in the way that rice plants, soil, water, and nutrients are managed, without requiring new seeds or more inputs.

Uphoff began documenting the results in Madagascar and encouraging testing of SRI in other countries after farmers whom CIIFAD was assisting under a USAID project to conserve biodiversity -- who had been producing only 2 tonnes per hectare of paddy rice with their usual methods and seeds on very poor soil -- averaged >8 tonnes with the new methods --without their adopting new varieties, without relying on inorganic fertilizer or agrochemical inputs, and with less rather than more irrigation water.

Beginning in the late 1990s, Uphoff worked with researchers and practitioners in Madagascar and elsewhere to obtain scientific evaluations of SRI ideas and methods and to facilitate their adaptation to other agricultural settings and crops. SRI modifies crop management rather than depending on improved varieties or external inputs. Among its practices are transplanting younger seedlings with wider spacing, careful water management, and enhancement of organic matter and biological processes and activity in the soil. Uphoff examined improvements that are made in rice plants’ morphology and physiology through their interaction with better soil conditions and more abundant, diverse and active life in the soil, rather than relying on genetic modification or agrochemical inputs.

These ideas and methods were spread beyond Madagascar and evaluated in other countries including China, Indonesia, India, Cuba, Vietnam and other rice-producing regions. In 2002, with assistance from the Rockefeller Foundation and World Bank, CIIFAD convened an international conference in China sharing SRI results and research findings from 15 countries. Collection of data from China, India, Indonesia, Cambodia and Vietnam in 2013 indicated that about 9.5 million farmers were using SRI methods on almost 3.5 million hectares. A calculation of the resulting increase in farmer incomes came to over $1 billion for these farmers in just one year for these countries, not considering the value of the irrigation water saved, about 25%. These numbers have since probably doubled or more. No resources have been available for a full evaluation. By 2024, SRI methods had been demonstrated and validated in over 60 countries.

During this time, Uphoff contributed to numerous publications, presentations, and international research and extension activities concerning SRI. He also disseminated information on the extension and application of SRI-derived principles to crops other than rice, developing the broader concept of a System of Crop Intensification (SCI) as SRI ideas and methods were extrapolated to crops such as wheat, finger millet, teff, sugarcane, and vegetables.

=== Agroecology and microbiology ===
After 2000, Uphoff's publications increasingly connecting SRI with broader questions concerning agroecology, soil health, and sustainable agricultural production, starting with an article on soil health. He focused on how agricultural productivity could be increased by biological processes that occur in the soil, around and inside plant roots, considering the effects of microorganisms as endophytes. In 1999, with Miguel Altieri he convened an international meeting on agroecology experience at the Rockefeller Foundation conference center in Bellagio, Italy.

Uphoff assembled, edited, and contributed to a volume published in 2006 on Biological Approaches to Sustainable Soil Systems that brought together contributions from over 100 researchers in 28 countries who had worked on issues of soil biology, soil fertility, soil ecology, and sustainable soil management. It examined a wide range of components and approaches intended to maintain or improve soil productivity while reducing dependence on external inputs. A second edition having over 80 contributors was edited and published in 2023 with Cornell colleague Janice E. Thies.

His SRI experience increasingly called attention to the relationships between agronomic practices and soil biological processes. A 2012 article characterized the microbiome—including bacteria, fungi, actinomycetes and protozoa—as an increasingly important area for understanding agricultural sustainability. He connected this research interest to his experience with SRI and to emerging evidence concerning beneficial associations of microorganisms with crop plants.

Colleagues in several countries with more expertise in this subject area have enlisted Uphoff’s participation in their publications to make their findings more accessible to a broader readership. An article published in Plant Molecular Biology based on transcriptomic analysis by Chinese colleagues showed that rhizobacteria inhabiting rice plants as endophytes influence metabolic and other processes occurring within plant tissues. The analysis identified which plant genes were being up- or down-regulated in the presence (or absence) of certain microbes introduced by inoculation. This affected cell signaling, phytohormone synthesis, photosynthesis, carbohydrate metabolism, cell-wall processes, and cell division. While SRI may be considered as a relatively ‘low-tech’ innovation, it is being validated by cutting-edge research.

=== Food security and international development ===
Uphoff's work has combined agricultural research with questions of poverty reduction, food security, resource conservation, and rural development. He has collaborated with and advised international development organizations, served at various times as a consultant or adviser to organizations including the World Bank, the UN Food and Agriculture Organization, USAID, the United Nations, and the Consultative Group for International Agricultural Research. His work with SRI brought these interests together, examining agricultural productivity through changes in management and knowledge, farmer participation, natural resource use, and ecological processes.

Awards and recognition

In 2002, Uphoff received the Outstanding Achievement Award for alumni from the University of Minnesota's College of Liberal Arts for contributions to political and economic development, sustainable agriculture, and rural development. While at the university, he had served as the president of its Minnesota Student Association (1962-63). Subsequently, he served as the elected International Affairs Vice-President of the U.S. National Student Association (1964-65).

In 2015, Uphoff and the SRI International Network and Resources Center received the inaugural Olam Prize for Innovation in Food Security.The award recognized SRI as an agricultural innovation with beneficial implications for food security and sustainable production. Uphoff accepted the award at the Global Science Conference on Climate-Smart Agriculture in Montpellier, France. The prize included US$50,000 to support further SRI research.

He was also the 2015 recipient of Cornell University's Clifton R. Wharton Jr. Award which recognized his contributions to international development.

== Research legacy ==
Uphoff's career spans fields that are usually treated separately: political science and development administration, participatory rural development, institutional analysis, irrigation management, social capital, sustainable agriculture, agroecology, and plant–microbe interactions. His early research examined how local institutions and farmer organizations could improve development outcomes, while his later work investigated how changes in agricultural management could interact with plant physiology and soil biology.

His work on SRI expanded international research and experimentation around the methodology and connected farmer-led agricultural innovation with formal scientific investigation. His later writings argued that understanding soil organisms and plant-associated microbiomes could help to explain some of the biological responses observed under agroecological management.
