= Henri de Laulanié =

French missionary and agronomist (1920–1995)

- Born: February 22, 1920; Poitou, France
- Died: June 23, 1995 (aged 75); Madagascar
- Known for: Developing the rice cultivation method SRI
- Notable work: Rice in Madagascar: A Developing Dialogue with Farmers

Henri de Laulanié was a French missionary and agronomist. From Poitou, France, he joined the Society of Jesus and spent most of his Jesuit life working with rice farmers in Madagascar, where he developed the rice cultivation method known as the System of Rice Intensification (SRI).

== Life ==
Henri de Laulanié de Sainte-Croix was trained as an agronomist at Institut National Agronomique in Paris, from which he graduated in 1938, and gained knowledge of the physiology of rice tillering from a document capitalising on rice yield components analysis published by the French NGO Groupe de Recherches et d'Echanges Technologiques (GRET), which mentioned the work of the Japanese scientist Katayama on the rice phyllochrones published in 1951.

He arrived on Madagascar in 1961, at the age of 41. As rice was the staple food of the Malagasy people, he set about trying to help farmers increase their rice production. He continued his efforts at improving rice cultivation until his death 34 years later at the age of 75. System of Rice Intensification (SRI) was first developed in 1983, but was not fully tested until some years later. His discovery of SRI was publicized in his book Rice in Madagascar.

SRI is based on four principles: 1. Establishing plants early and quickly, to favor healthy and vigorous root and vegetative plant growth. 2. Maintaining low plant density to allow optimal development of each individual plant and to minimize competitions between plants for nutrients, water and sunlight. 3. Enriching soils with organic matter to improve nutrient and water holding capacity, increase microbial life in the soil, and to provide a good substrate for roots to grow and develop, 4. Reducing and controlling the application of water, providing only as much water as necessary for optimal plant development and to favor aerobic soil conditions.

The System of Rice Intensification was later adopted by over 55 countries around the world and has improved food security for millions of small holder rice farmers.

de Laulanié died in Madagascar in 1995. His grave is located in the cemetery at Ambohipo, Madagascar.

== Agricultural school ==
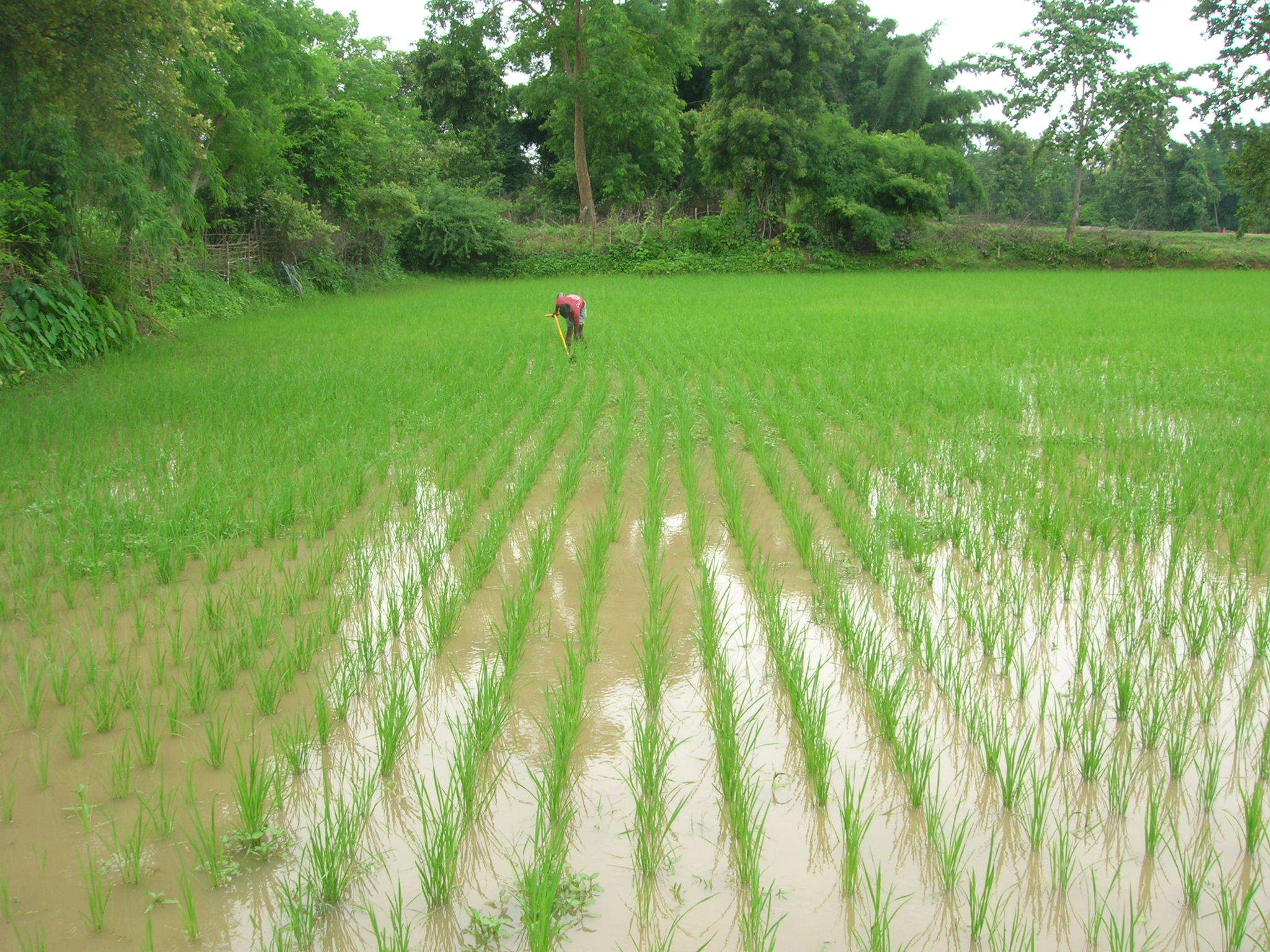
SRI field

In 1981, de Laulanié founded the agricultural school General Training Course for Rural Adults (Cours de Formation Generale pour Adultes Ruraux – CFGR) at Antsirabe to help educate the young. He had earlier taught agriculture at the Institut National d'Horticulture et de Paysage in Angers, France. After arriving in Madagascar he set to work at devising courses suited to the local farmers, and implemented his vision through CFGR after 19 years of experience, devising a course plan that included physics, chemistry, economics, and sociology. He had acquired experience for such an effort while in Angers, training those released from military service to pass the entrance exam at the university. He founded CFGR to train rural youth and adults to be proud of their peasant identity and rural origins. This was in response to the curriculum in other such schools which he believed to be insensitive to the farmers' difficult situation.

The school now offers correspondence courses for adults who lack the opportunity for an education, especially in the areas of Antananarivo, Mahitsy, Fihaonana, Andriampamaky, Mampikony, Ambohibary-Sambaina, Tsaravavaka-Antsirabe, Ambositra, Ivato, and Anjomà-Nandihizana, Madagascar. CFGR is a member of World Relations Board for Training Farmers.

== See also ==
- Origin of SRI system.
- Biography (in French)
