= Conservation agriculture =

Farming system to preserve and regenerate land capacity

Conservation agriculture (CA) can be defined by a statement given by the Food and Agriculture Organization of the United Nations as "Conservation Agriculture (CA) is a farming system that can prevent losses of arable land while regenerating degraded lands. It promotes minimum soil disturbance (i.e. no-till farming), maintenance of a permanent soil cover, and diversification of plant species. It enhances biodiversity and natural biological processes above and below the ground surface, which contribute to increased water and nutrient use efficiency and to improved and sustained crop production."

Agriculture according to the New Standard Encyclopedia is "one of the most important sectors in the economies of most nations" (New Standard 1992). At the same time conservation is the use of resources in a manner that safely maintains a resource that can be used by humans. Conservation has become critical because the global population has increased over the years and more food needs to be produced every year (New Standard 1992). Sometimes referred to as "agricultural environmental management", conservation agriculture may be sanctioned and funded through conservation programs promulgated through agricultural legislation, such as the U.S. Farm Bill.

== Key principles ==
The Food and Agriculture Organization of the United Nations (FAO) has determined that conservation agriculture (CA) has three key principles that producers (farmers) can proceed through in the process of CA. These three principles outline what conservationists and producers believe can be done to conserve what we use for a longer period of time.

The first key principle in CA is practicing minimum soil disturbance which is essential to maintaining minerals within the soil, stopping erosion, and preventing water loss from occurring within the soil. In the past agriculture has looked at soil tillage as a main process in the introduction of new crops to an area. It was believed that tilling the soil would increase fertility within the soil through mineralization that takes place in the soil. Today tillage is seen as destroying organic matter that can be found within the soil cover. Tilling of soil can cause severe erosion and crusting which leads to a decrease in soil fertility. No-till farming has caught on as a process that can save soil organic levels for a longer period and still allow the soil to be productive for longer periods (FAO 2007). Minimum soil disturbance also conserves soil micro and macro-organism habitats that are commonly destroyed in conventional ploughing practices.

When no-till practices are followed, the producer sees a reduction in production cost for a certain crop. The process of tilling increases time and labor for producing that crop. Tillage of the ground requires more money in order to fuel tractors or to provide feed for the animals pulling the plough. The producer sees a reduction in labor because he or she does not have to be in the fields as long as a conventional farmer.

The second key principle in CA is much like the first in dealing with protecting the soil. The principle of managing the top soil to create a permanent organic soil cover can allow for growth of organisms within the soil structure. This growth will break down the mulch that is left on the soil surface. The breaking down of this mulch will produce a high organic matter level which will act as a fertilizer for the soil surface. If CA practices were used done for many years and enough organic matter was being built up at the surface, then a layer of mulch would start to form. This layer helps prevent soil erosion from taking place and ruining the soil's profile or layout. The presence of mulching also reduce the velocity of runoff and the impact of rain drops thus reducing soil erosion and runoff.

According to the article "The role of conservation agriculture and sustainable agriculture", the layer of mulch that is built up over time will become like a buffer zone between soil and mulch and this will help reduce wind and water erosion. With this comes the protection of the soil's surface when rain falls on the ground. Land that is not protected by a layer of mulch is left open to the elements (Hobbs et al. 2007). This type of ground cover also helps keep the temperature and moisture levels of the soil at a higher level rather than if it was tilled every year (FAO 2007).

The third principle is the practicing diverse crop rotations or crop interactions. According to an article published in the Physiological Transactions of the Royal Society called "The role of conservation agriculture and sustainable agriculture", crop rotation can be used best as a disease control against other preferred crops (Hobbs et al. 2007). This process will not allow pests such as insects and weeds to be set into a rotation with specific crops. Rotational crops will act as a natural insecticide and herbicide against specific crops. Not allowing insects or weeds to establish a pattern will help to eliminate problems with yield reduction and infestations within fields (FAO 2007). Crop rotation can also help build up soil infrastructure. Establishing crops in a rotation allows for an extensive buildup of rooting zones which will allow for better water infiltration (Hobbs et al. 2007).

Organic molecules in the soil break down into phosphates, nitrates and other beneficial elements which are thus better absorbed by plants. Plowing increases the amount of oxygen in the soil and increases the aerobic processes, hastening the breakdown of organic material. Thus more nutrients are available for the next crop but, at the same time, the soil is depleted more quickly of its nutrient reserves.

== Examples ==
Conservation- or eco-agriculture involves multiple elements to protect wildlife.

In conservation agriculture there are many examples that can be looked towards as a way of farming and at the same time conserving. These practices are well known by most producers. The process of no-till is one that follows the first principle of CA, causing minimal mechanical soil disturbance. No-till also brings other benefits to the producer. According to the FAO, tillage is one of the most "energy consuming" processes that can be used: It requires a lot of labor, time, and fuel to till. Producers can save 30% to 40% of time and labor by practicing the no-till process. (FAO 3020)

Besides conserving the soil, there are other examples of how CA is used. According to an article in Science called "Farming and the Fate of Wild Nature" there are two more kinds of CA. The practice of wildlife-friendly farming and land sparing are ideas for producers who are looking to practice better conservation towards biodiversity (Green, et al. 2005).

=== Wildlife-friendly farming ===
Wildlife-friendly farming, also known as land sharing, allows for the conservation of biodiversity while also allowing for production of agricultural products. In this approach, land is set aside to preserve the wildlife while the rest is used to fulfill the farmers need of agricultural commodities. Farmers take this approach by leaving some aspects of the land the same (i.e., scattered trees and patches of initial vegetation) while harvesting a diverse grouping of crops around it. This, in turn, allows for animals such as bees to pollinate, and the natural predation of unwanted pests. By practicing such method the harvester can expect to see much lower yields, but also an increase in biodiversity given time. This decrease of yield then gives rise to the idea of land sparing, the maximization of yield in a homogenous landscape.

=== Land sparing ===
Land sparing is another way that producer and conservationist can be on the same page. Land sparing advocates for the land that is being used for agricultural purposes to continue to produce crops at increased yield. With an increase in yield on all land that is in use, other land can be set aside for conservation and production for biodiversity. Agricultural land stays in production but would have to increase its yield potential to keep up with demand. Land that is not being put into agriculture would be used for conserving biodiversity (Green, et al. 2005). In fact, data from the Food and Agriculture Organization shows that between 1961 and 2012, the amount of arable land needed to produce the same amount of food declined by 68 percent worldwide.

== Benefits ==
In the field of CA there are many benefits that both the producer and conservationist can obtain.

On the side of the conservationist, CA can be seen as beneficial because there is an effort to conserve what people use every day. Since agriculture is one of the most destructive forces against biodiversity, CA can change the way humans produce food and energy. With conservation come environmental benefits of CA. These benefits include less erosion possibilities, better water conservation, improvement in air quality due to lower emissions being produced, and a chance for larger biodiversity in a given area.

On the side of the producer and/or farmer, CA can eventually do all that is done in conventional agriculture, and it can conserve better than conventional agriculture. CA according to Theodor Friedrich, who is a specialist in CA, believes "Farmers like it because it gives them a means of conserving, improving, and making more efficient use of their natural resources" (FAO 2006). Producers will find that the benefits of CA will come later rather than sooner. Since CA takes time to build up enough organic matter and have soils become their own fertilizer, the process does not start to work overnight. But if producers make it through the first few years of production, results will start to become more satisfactory.

CA is shown to have even higher yields and higher outputs than conventional agriculture once it has been established over long periods. Also, a producer has the benefit of knowing that the soil in which his crops are grown is a renewable resource. According to New Standard Encyclopedia, soils are a renewable resource, which means that whatever is taken out of the soil can be put back over time (New Standard 1992). As long as good soil upkeep is maintained, the soil will continue to renew itself. This could be very beneficial to a producer who is practicing CA and is looking to keep soils at a productive level for an extended time.

The farmer and/or producer can use this same land in another way when crops have been harvested. The introduction of grazing livestock to a field that once held crops can be beneficial for the producer and also the field itself. Livestock manure can be used as a natural fertilizer for a producer's field which will then be beneficial for the producer the next year when crops are planted once again. The practice of grazing livestock using CA helps the farmer who raises crops on that field and the farmer who raises the livestock that graze off that field. Livestock produce compost or manure which are a great help in generating soil fertility (Pawley W.H. 1963). The practices of CA and grazing livestock on a field for many years can allow for better yields in the following years as long as these practices continue to be followed.

The FAO believes that there are three major benefits from CA:

- Within fields that are controlled by CA the producer will see an increase in organic matter.
- Increase in water conservation due to the layer of organic matter and ground cover to help eliminate transportation and access runoff.
- Improvement of soil structure and rooting zone.

== Future development ==
Producers and conservationists increasingly view conservation agriculture (CA) as a vital approach for long-term sustainability. Numerous organizations have been established globally to conduct research, educate stakeholders, and support land acquisition for habitat preservation (New Standard 1992).

Another way in which CA is looking to the future is through prevention. According to the European Journal of Agronomy producers are looking for ways to reduce leaching problems within their fields. These producers are using the same principles within CA, in that they are leaving cover over their fields in order to save fields from erosion and leaching of chemicals (Kirchmann & Thorvaldsson 2000). Processes and studies like this are allowing for a better understanding of how to conserve what we are using and finding ways to put back something that may have been lost before.

In the same journal article is presented another way in which producers and conservationists are looking towards the future. Circulation of plant nutrients can be a vital part for conserving the future. An example of this would be the use of animal manure. This process has been used for quite some time now, but the future is looking towards ways to handle and conserve nutrients within manure for a longer time. But besides animal waste, food and urban waste are also being looked towards as a way to use growth within CA (Kirchmann & Thorvaldsson 2000). Turning these products from waste to being used to grow crops and improve yields is something that would be beneficial for conservationists and producers.

Agri-environment schemes

In 1992, 'agri-environment schemes' became compulsory for all European Union Member States. In the following years the main purpose of these schemes changed slightly. Initially, they sought to protect threatened habitats, but gradually shifted their focus to the prevention of the loss of wildlife from agricultural landscapes. Most recently, the schemes are placing more emphasis on improving the services that the land can provide to humans (e.g. pollination). Overall, farmers involved in the scheme aim to practice environmentally friendlier farming techniques such as: reducing the use of pesticides, managing or altering their land to increase more wildlife friendly habitats (e.g. increasing areas of trees and bushes), reducing irrigation, conserving soil, and organic farming. As the changes in practices that ensure the protection of the environment are costly to farmers, the EU developed agri-environment schemes to financially compensate individual farmers for applying these changes and therefore increased the implementation of conservation agriculture. The schemes are voluntary for farmers. Once joined, they commit to a minimum of five years during which they have to adopt various sustainable farming techniques. According to the Euro-stat website, in 2009 the agricultural area enrolled in agri-environment schemes covered 38.5 million hectares (20.9% of agricultural land in the 27 member states of the EU at the time) (Agri-environmental indicator 2015). The European Commission spent a total of €3.23 billion on agri-environment schemes in 2012, significantly exceeding the cost of managing special sites of conservation (Natura 2000) that year, which came to a total of €39.6 million (Batáry et al. 2015).

There are two main types of agri-environment schemes which have shown different outcomes. Out-of-production schemes tend to be used in extensive farming practices (where the farming land is widespread and less intensive farming is practiced), and focus on improving or setting land aside that will not be used for the production of food, for example, the addition of wildflower strips. In-production schemes (used for a smaller scale, but more intensively farmed land) focus on the sustainable management of arable crops or grassland, for example reduction of pesticides, reduction of grassland mowing, and most commonly, organic farming. In a 2015 review of studies examining the effects of the two schemes, it was found that out-of-production schemes had a higher success rate at enhancing the number of thriving species around the land. The reason behind this is thought to be the scheme's focus on enhancing specific species by providing them with more unaltered habitats, which results in more food resources for the specific species. On the other hand, in-production schemes attempt to enhance the quality of the land in general, and are thus less species specific. Based on the findings, the reviewers suggest that schemes which more specifically target the declining groups of species, may be more effective. The findings and the targets will be implemented between 2015 and 2020, so that by 2025, the effectiveness of these schemes can be re-assessed and will have increased significantly (Batáry et al. 2015).

In this vein, in recent years 'results based pilot programs' have been introduced across the EU under Pillar Two of the Common Agriculture Policy. Results-based agri-environmental programs are defined by the European Commission as "schemes where farmers and land managers are paid for delivering an environmental result or outcome, e.g. number of breeding birds, or number of plant species in grasslands, with the flexibility to choose what management is required to achieve the desired result." Results-based payment programs are also commonly referred to as Pay for Performance or Payment for Ecosystem Services. These programs differ from traditional conservation programs by focusing on observed, verifiable outcomes as opposed to implementation of best practices. Pure results-based programs refer to programs that provide payments to farmers solely on the delivery of an environmental outcome. Hybrid results-based programs refer to programs that may have a management requirement component in addition to payments for observable environmental outcomes. Results based programs often increase farmer autonomy and participation, produce clear quantifiable results and effectively link payment to environmental conservation outcomes. Some NGOs have started to pilot similar programs in the US, for example Winrock International partnered with the Sand County Foundation to provide payment to farmers for reducing nutrient loads from their lands across the Midwest.

== Problems ==
As much as conservation agriculture can benefit the world, there are some problems that come with it. There are many reasons why conservation agriculture cannot always be a win-win situation. Examples of these disadvantages include high initial costs of specialized planting equipment, and a new dynamic farming system that requires new management skills and a learning process by the farmer. Long term experience with conservation farming all over the world has shown that this system does not present more or less but different problems to a farmer, all of them possible to resolve.

There are not enough people who can financially turn from conventional farming to conservation. The process of CA takes time; when a producer first becomes a conservationist, the results can be a financial loss to them (in most cases, the investment and policy generally exist). CA is based upon establishing an organic layer and producing its own fertilizer and this may take time. It can be many years before a producer will start to see better yields than he/she has had previously. Another financial undertaking is purchasing of new equipment. When starting to use CA, a producer may have to buy new planters or drills in order to produce effectively. These financial tasks are ones that may impact whether or not a producer decides to switch to CA or not.

Interactions with livestock and competition for crop residues - In developing countries, livestock is often an integral part of the farming system, so it needs to be considered when introducing CA. The application of CA requires a critical level of crop residues remaining on the surface, while traditionally most of these residues are used for feeding livestock. It is a common practice to allow livestock to graze in the harvested crop fields or to slash the crop residue and store it for fodder.

With the struggle to adapt comes the struggle to make CA grow across the globe. CA has not spread as quickly as most conservationists would like. The reason for this is because there is not enough pressure for producers in places such as North America to change their way of living to a more conservationist outlook. But in the tropics there is more pressure to change to conservation areas because of the limited resources that are available. Places like Europe have also started to catch onto the ideas and principles of CA, but still nothing much is being done to change due to there being a minimal amount of pressure for people to change their ways of living (FAO 2006).

With CA comes the idea of producing enough food. With cutting back in fertilizer, not tilling the ground, and other processes comes the responsibility to feed the world. According to the Population Reference Bureau, there were around 6.08 billion people on Earth in the year 2000. By 2050 there will be an estimated 9.1 billion people. With this increase comes the responsibility for producers to increase food supply using the same or less land than we use today. Problems arise in the fact that if CA farms do not produce as much as conventional farms, this leaves the world with less food for more people.

== See also ==
- Agroecology
- Biodiversity
- Sustainable agriculture
- No-till farming
