= 1971 Pacific typhoon season =

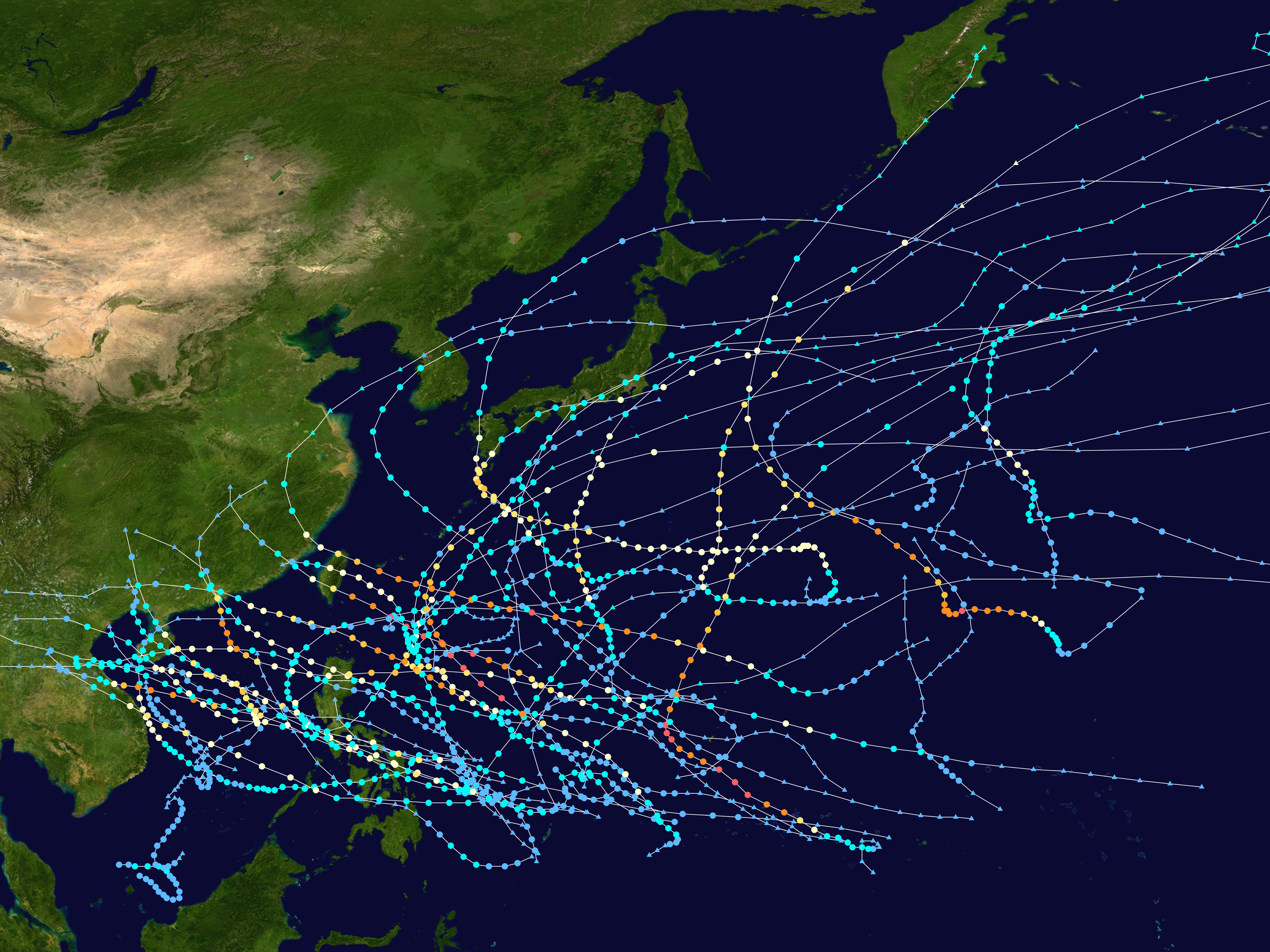
- Season summary map

Seasonal boundaries
- First system formed: January 7, 1971
- Last system dissipated: December 29, 1971

Strongest storm
- Name: Irma
  - Maximum winds: 285 km/h (180 mph) (1-minute sustained)
  - Lowest pressure: 884 hPa (mbar)

Seasonal statistics
- Total depressions: 70
- Total storms: 35
- Typhoons: 24
- Very strong typhoons: 6 (unofficial)
- Total fatalities: At least 617 total
- Total damage: $57.7 million (1971 USD)

Related articles
- 1971 Atlantic hurricane season; 1971 Pacific hurricane season; 1971 North Indian Ocean cyclone season

The 1971 Pacific typhoon season was an extremely active season that featured the second highest typhoon count on record. It has no official bounds; it ran year-round in 1971, but most tropical cyclones tend to form in the northwestern Pacific Ocean between June and December. These dates conventionally delimit the period of each year when most tropical cyclones form in the northwestern Pacific Ocean.

The scope of this article is limited to the Pacific Ocean, north of the equator and west of the International Date Line. Storms that form east of the date line and north of the equator are called hurricanes; see 1971 Pacific hurricane season. Tropical Storms formed in the entire west pacific basin were assigned a name by the Joint Typhoon Warning Center. Tropical depressions in this basin have the "W" suffix added to their number. Tropical depressions that enter or form in the Philippine area of responsibility are assigned a name by the Philippine Weather Bureau, which would later be reformed into the Philippine Atmospheric, Geophysical and Astronomical Services Administration (PAGASA) the following year. This can often result in the same storm having two names.

== Seasonal summary ==
Most storms in a singular Pacific typhoon season (1955-present)
Year	Tropical storms	Typhoons	
Year	Tropical storms	Typhoons	Super typhoons
1964	39	26 (record high)	7
1994	36	20	6
1971	35	24	6
1965	35	21	11 (record high; tied with 1997)
1961	35	20	8
1967	35	20	5
2026	32	15	7
1989	32	20	5
1974	32	16	0 (record low)
1992	31	16	5
1955	31	20	4
2013	31	13	5
Note: Data begins at the year 1955 due to earlier data being increasingly unreliable. Totals for tropical storms and typhoons after 1964 are from the Japan Meteorological Agency, and totals for the unofficial super typhoon category are from the Joint Typhoon Warning Center.

According to the United States Joint Typhoon Warning Center, the 1971 season was the most active season since 1967, with a total of 35 tropical storms being monitored by them during the year. In addition to the 35 tropical storms, the Japan Meteorological Agency considered Tropical Depression 25W to be an additional tropical storm, which was only classified as a tropical depression by the JTWC.

== Systems ==
=== Severe Tropical Storm Sarah ===
- Severe tropical storm (JMA)
- Tropical storm (SSHWS)
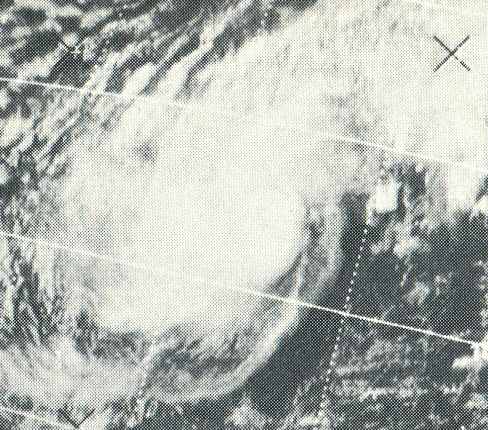
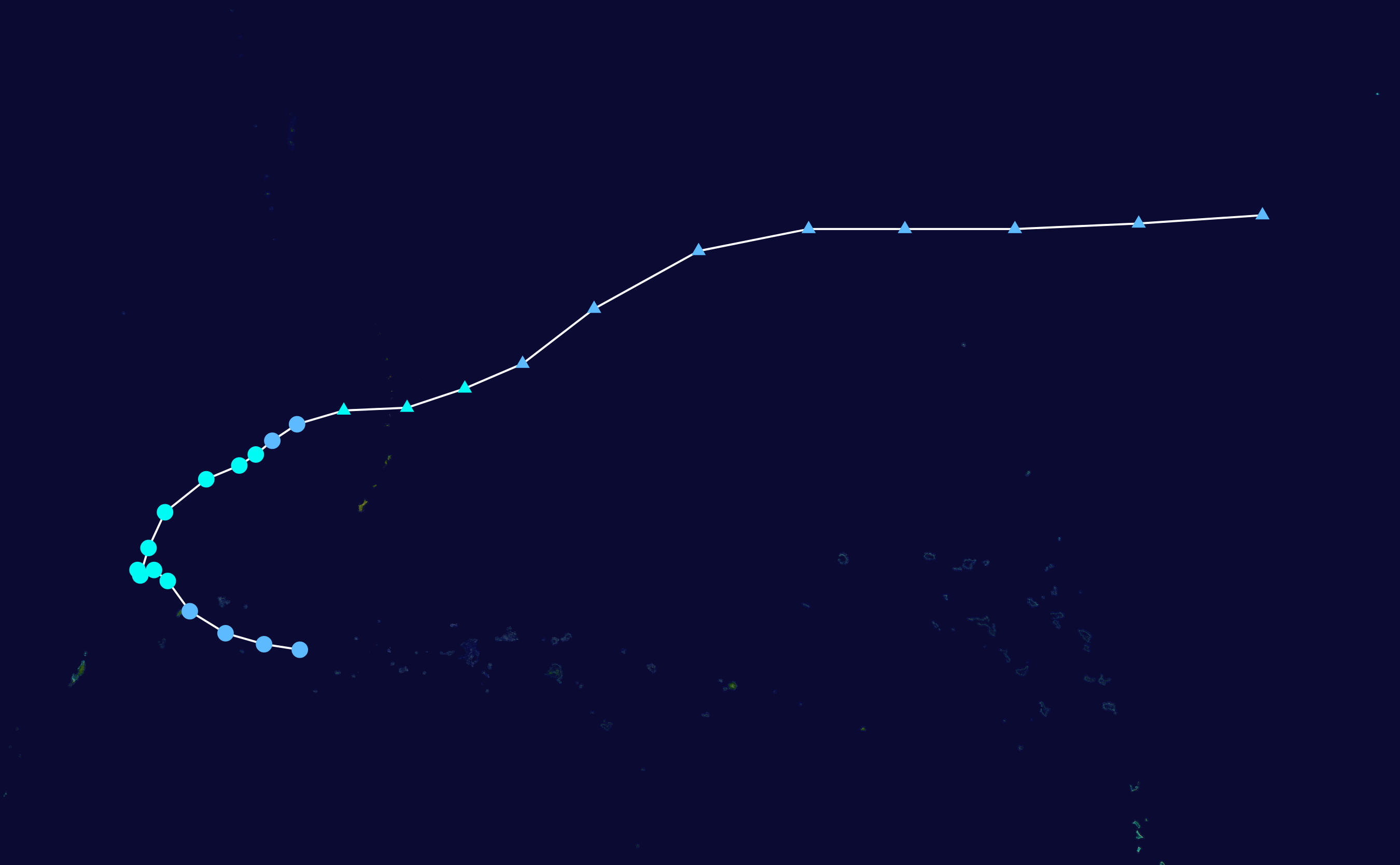
- Duration: January 8 – January 11
- Peak intensity: 95 km/h (60 mph) (1-min); 990 hPa (mbar)

During January 8, the JMA started to monitor a tropical depression that had developed, about 500 km (310 mi) to the east of Ngerulmud, Palau. Over the next day the system gradually developed further as it moved north-westwards, before it was classified as a tropical storm and named Sarah by the JTWC, after a US Navy plane had found an organised system. The system subsequently recurved north-eastwards, before it was classified as a Severe Tropical Storm by the JMA during January 10. During that day, the JTWC reported that the system had peaked, with 1-minute sustained wind-speeds of 95 km/h (60 mph). Over the next day, the system quickly weakened and became an extratropical cyclone during January 11. Sarah's extratropical remnants were subsequently tracked as they moved north-eastwards, until it made landfall on Canada and broke up over the mountains of British Columbia during January 17.

=== Tropical Storm Thelma (Bebeng) ===
- Tropical storm (JMA)
- Tropical storm (SSHWS)
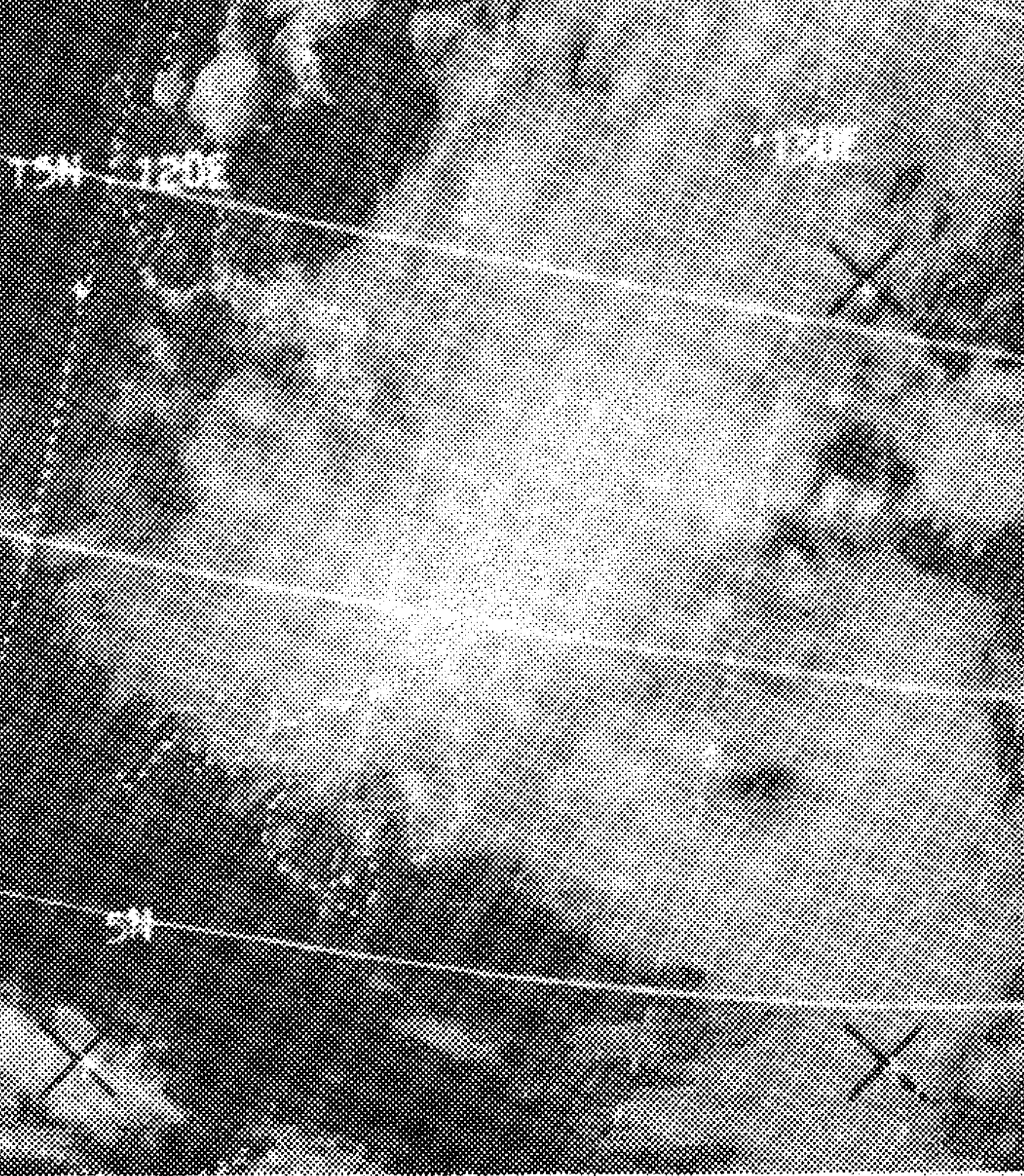
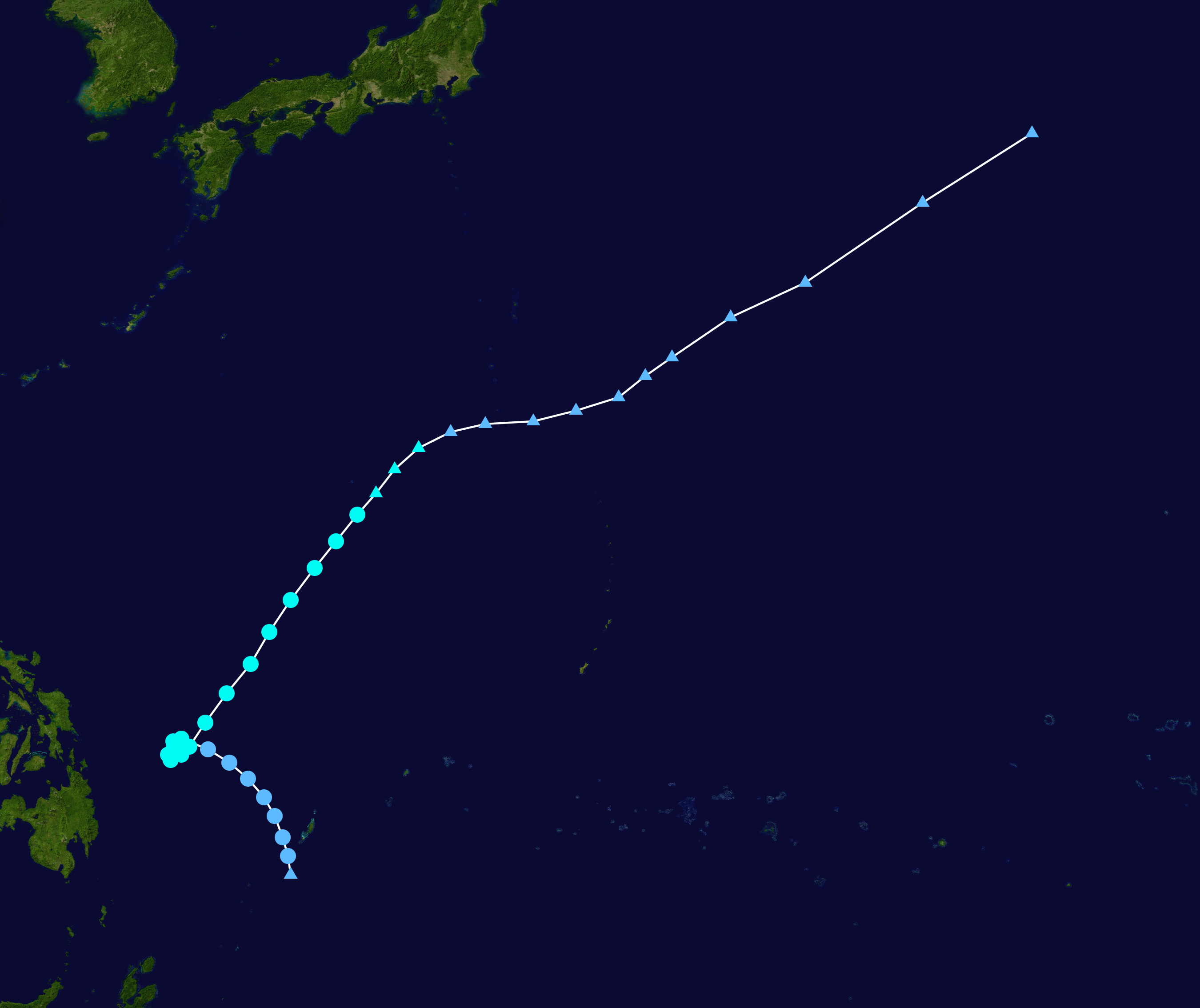
- Duration: March 16 – March 21
- Peak intensity: 85 km/h (50 mph) (1-min); 994 hPa (mbar)

On March 16, a tropical depression formed to the south of Guam. It immediately entered the Philippine Area of Responsibility, earning the local name Bebeng. It executed a small loop to the east of Mindanao before it traveled to the northwest. It exited the Area of Responsibility as a tropical storm before transitioning to an extratropical storm, southwest of Minami-Tori-shima. The extratropical storm weakened and dissipated on March 21, to the south-southeast of Japan.

=== Typhoon Vera (Karing) ===
- Typhoon (JMA)
- Category 2-equivalent typhoon (SSHWS)
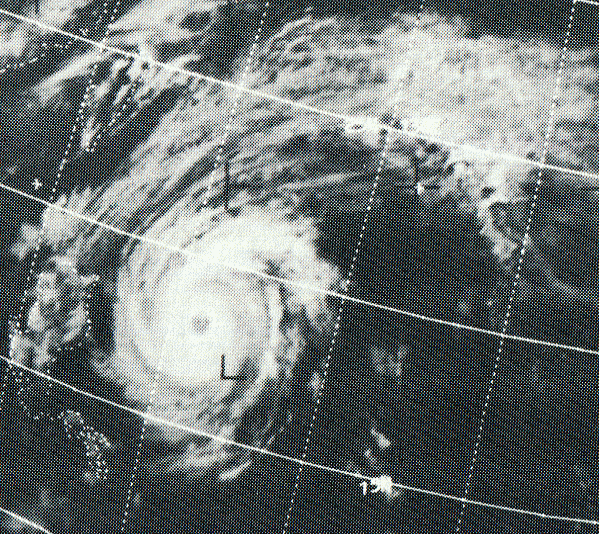
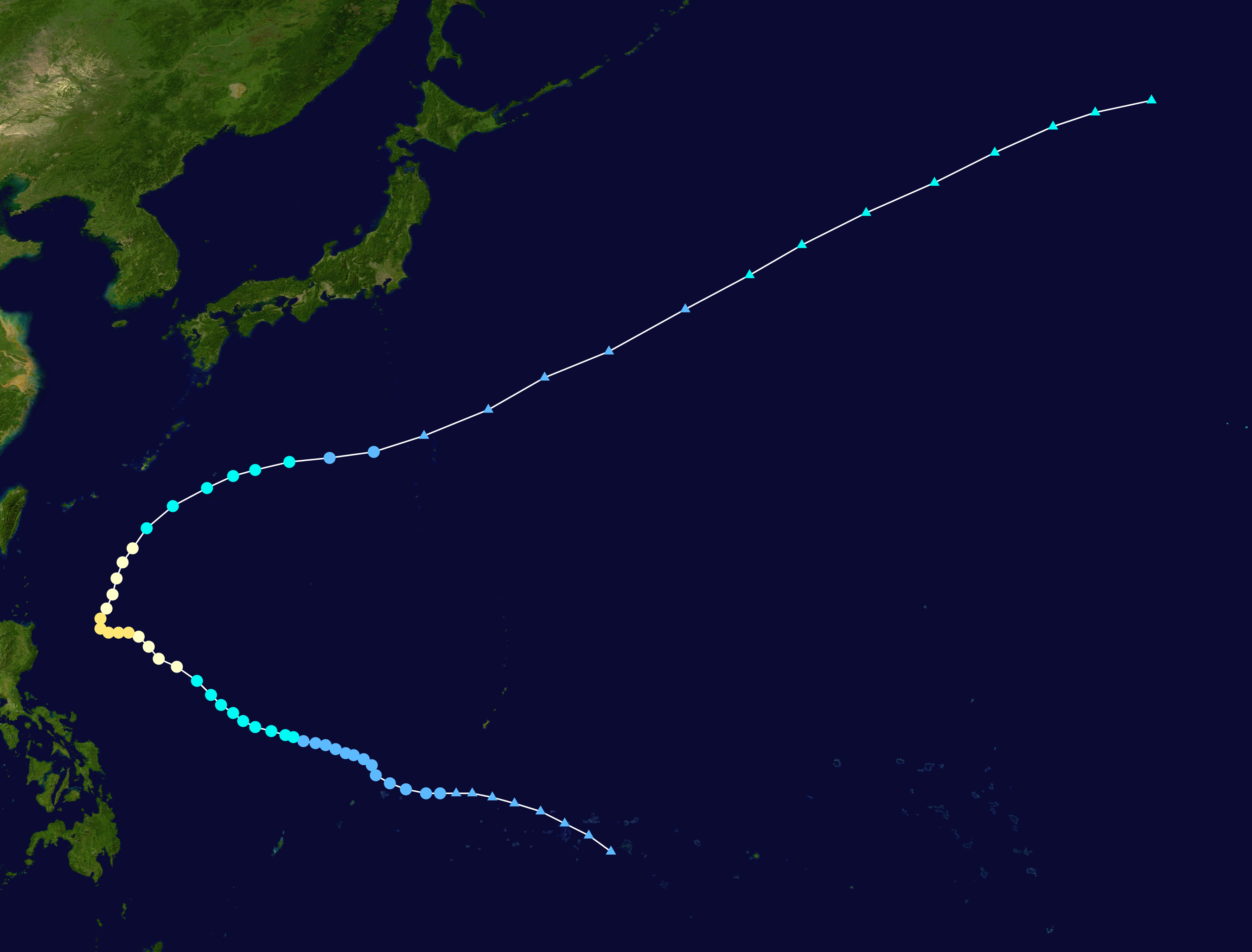
- Duration: April 6 – April 19
- Peak intensity: 165 km/h (105 mph) (1-min); 965 hPa (mbar)

=== Typhoon Wanda (Diding) ===
- Typhoon (JMA)
- Category 1-equivalent typhoon (SSHWS)
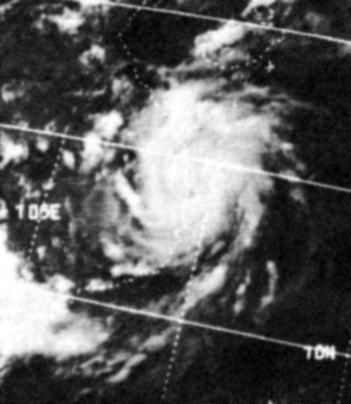
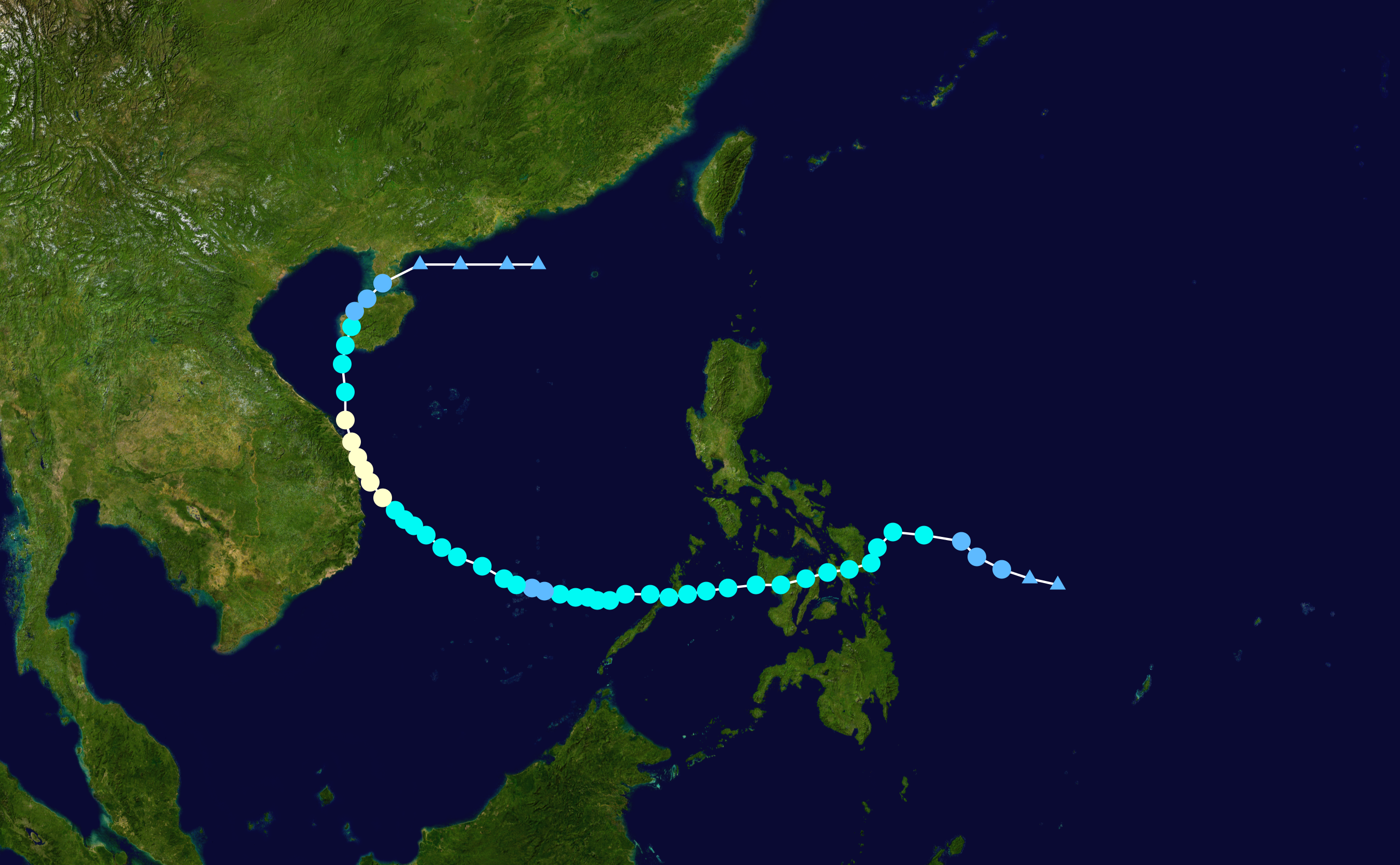
- Duration: April 22 – May 5
- Peak intensity: 140 km/h (85 mph) (1-min); 980 hPa (mbar)

On April 23 Tropical Storm Wanda began its life to the east of the Philippines. It tracked over the archipelago, and emerged into the South China Sea on the 25th. It turned to the northwest, and became a typhoon on May 1 just off the coast of South Vietnam. The westerlies brought Wanda to the north and northeast, where it weakened until dissipating on the 4th near Hainan Island.

The storm caused 56 deaths (with 14 missing) and $700,000 in damage (1971 USD) from the heavy flooding across the Philippines. While Wanda brushed the coast of Vietnam, the United States Army grounded most aircraft in northern areas and skirmishes related to the Vietnam War temporarily decreased until the storm passed by. In Quảng Ngãi Province, 23 people were killed.

=== Typhoon Amy ===
- Typhoon (JMA)
- Category 5-equivalent super typhoon (SSHWS)
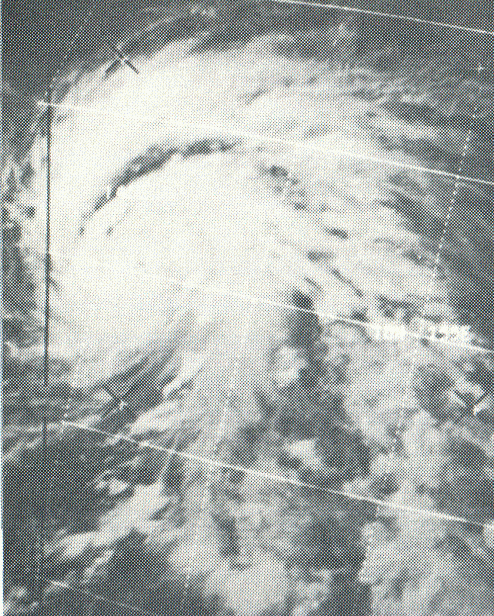
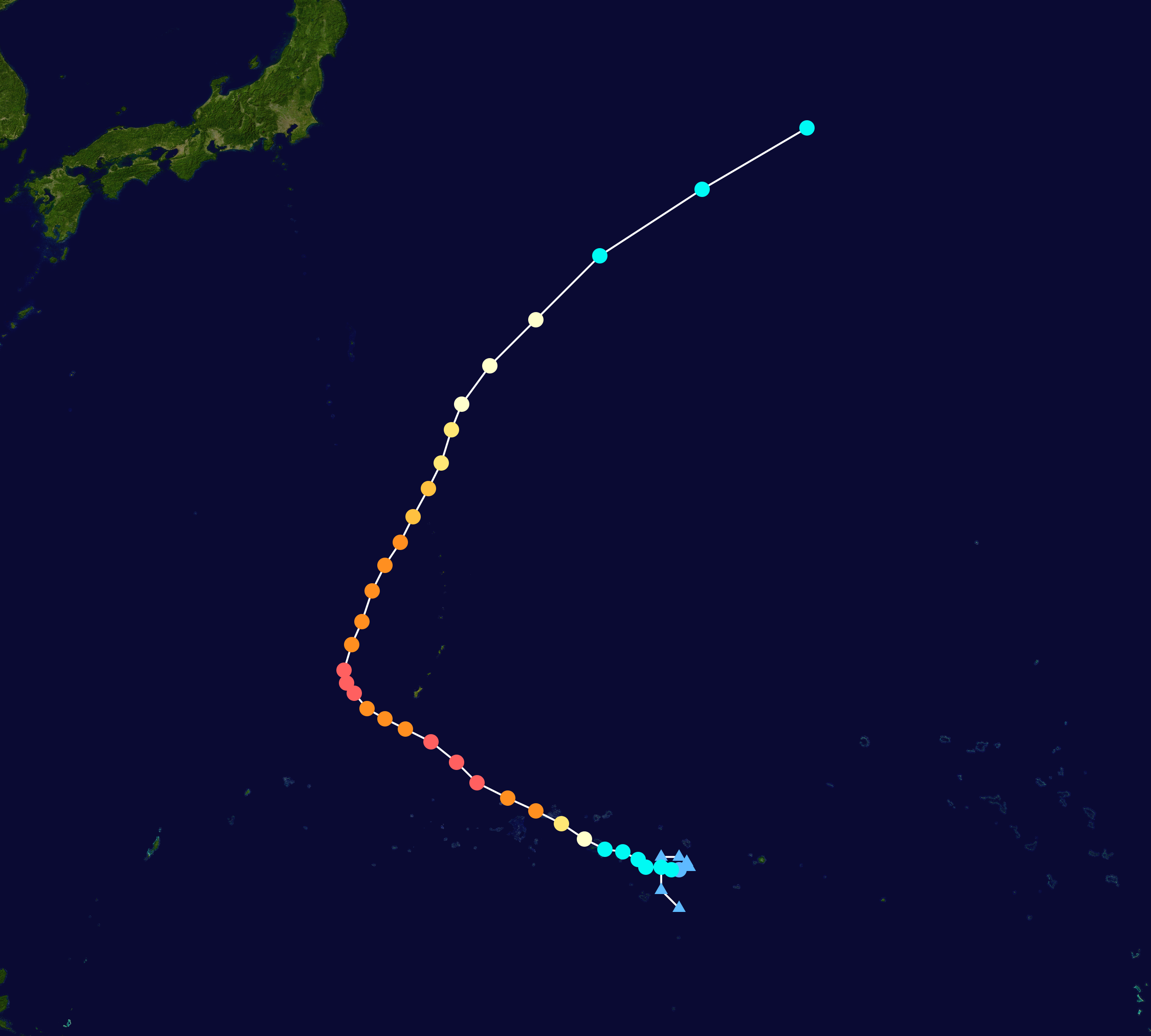
- Duration: April 27 – May 7
- Peak intensity: 280 km/h (175 mph) (1-min); 890 hPa (mbar)

According to the JTWC best track, Amy was first noted as a tropical depression early on April 29. Amy reached tropical storm status shortly afterwards, and became a typhoon by early on May 1. The cyclone then rapidly intensified into a Category 5 super typhoon with 1-minute sustained winds of 280 km/h (175 mph) on May 2, with the JMA estimating a minimum central pressure of 890 mb (hPa; 26.28 inHg), although the JTWC estimated a slightly higher pressure of 895 mbar (hPa; 26.43 inHg), while noting a compact eye 10 nautical miles across. Although Amy weakened to a Category 4 super typhoon on May 3, it regained Category 5 intensity later that day, with 1-minute sustained winds of 260 km/h (160 mph) and a central pressure of 900 mb (hPa; 26.58 inHg). The storm began to weaken by May 4 and was last noted as producing tropical-storm force winds on May 7, after which Amy was absorbed by a frontal system.

In deepening to 890 mb, Amy became the most intense typhoon on record in May. On Truk Atoll, now known as Chuuk Atoll, one person was killed after a coconut tree fell on him. On May 18, the Federated States of Micronesia was declared a disaster area by the Federal Emergency Management Agency. The weather station and over 2,250 homes were destroyed on Namonuito Atoll.

=== Severe Tropical Storm Babe (Etang) ===
- Severe tropical storm (JMA)
- Tropical storm (SSHWS)
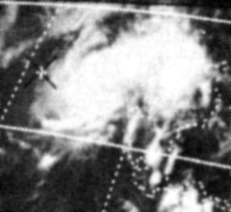
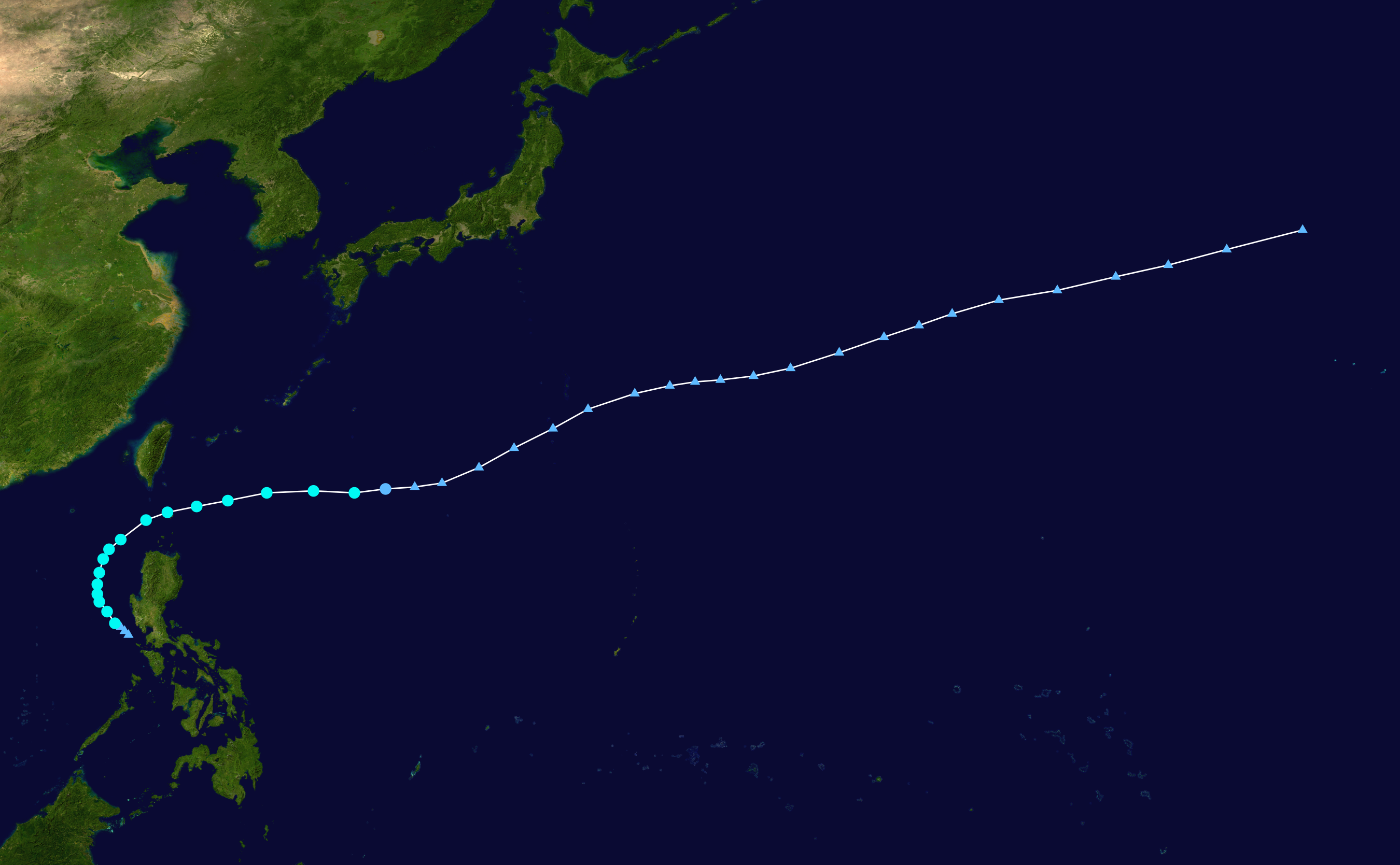
- Duration: May 2 – May 7
- Peak intensity: 100 km/h (65 mph) (1-min); 990 hPa (mbar)

=== Severe Tropical Storm Carla (Gening) ===
- Severe tropical storm (JMA)
- Tropical storm (SSHWS)
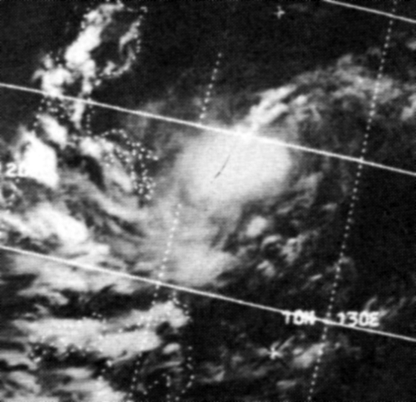
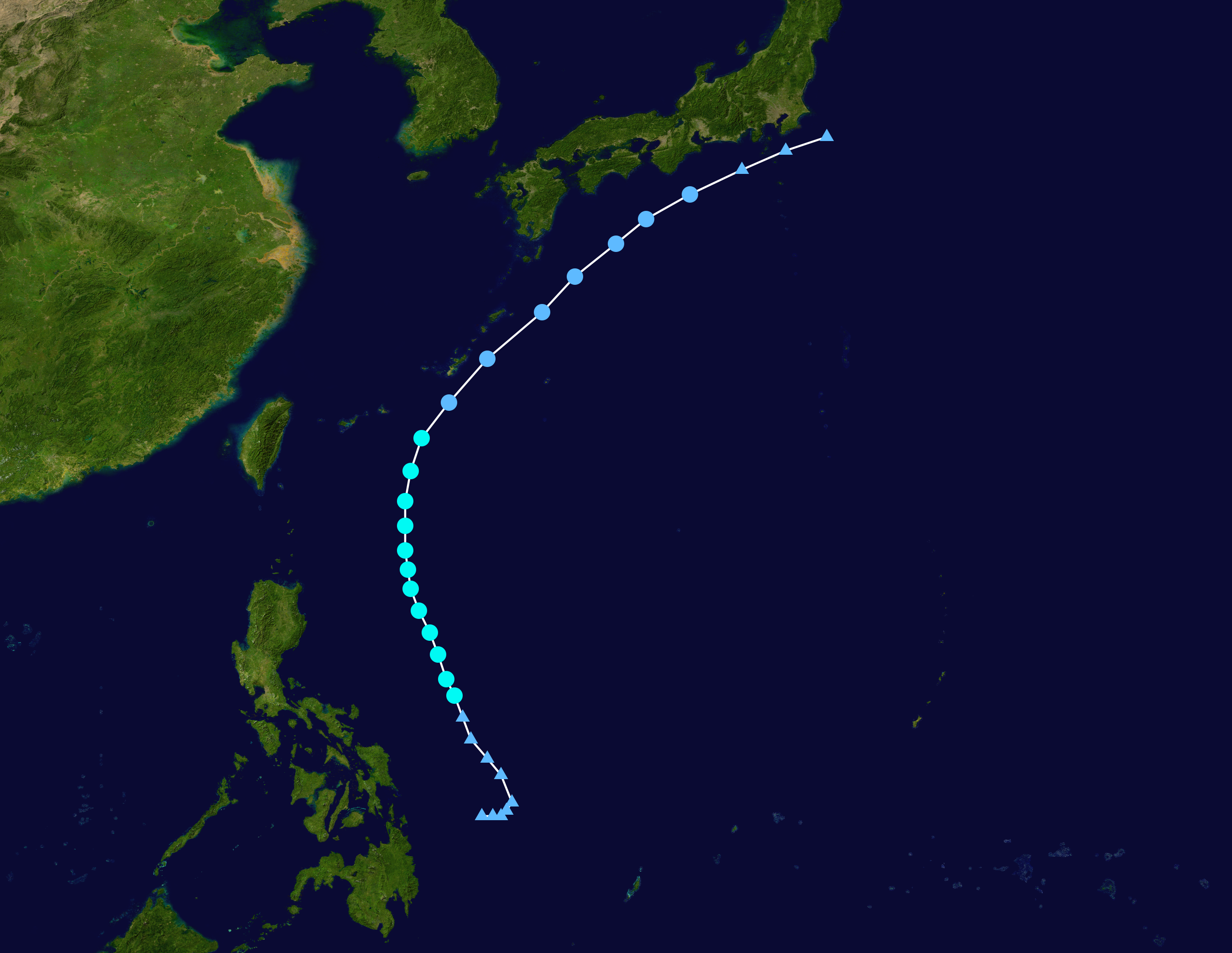
- Duration: May 17 – May 23
- Peak intensity: 95 km/h (60 mph) (1-min); 995 hPa (mbar)

=== Typhoon Dinah (Herming) ===
- Typhoon (JMA)
- Category 2-equivalent typhoon (SSHWS)
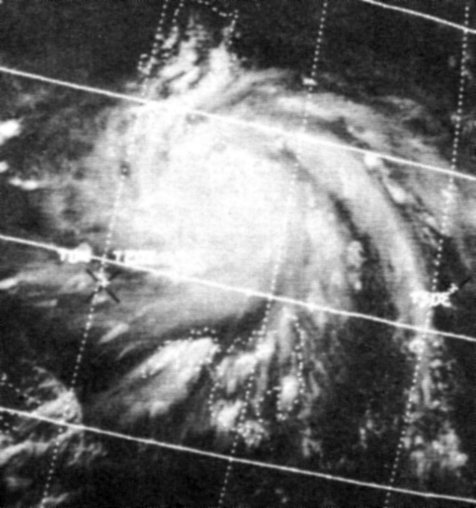
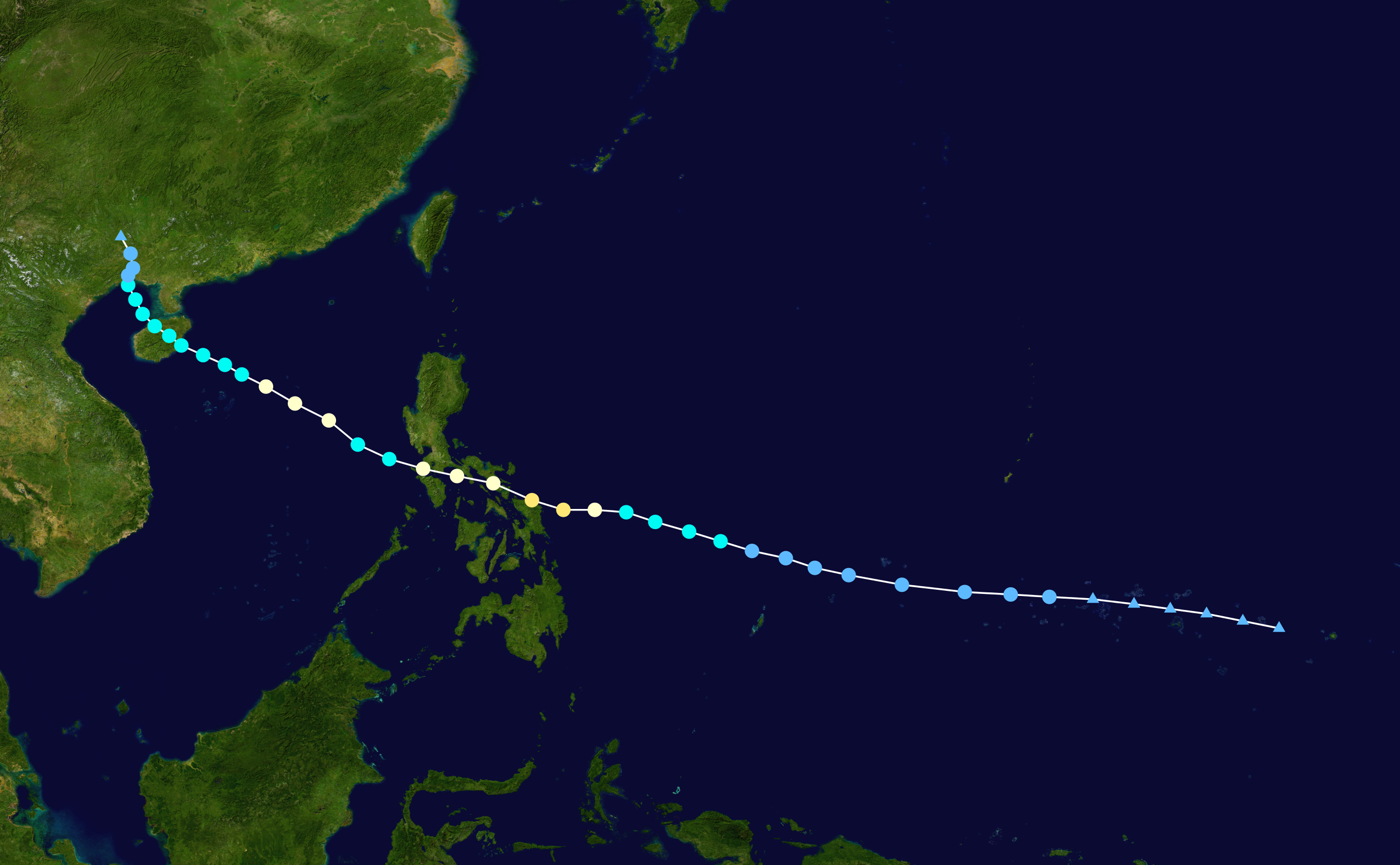
- Duration: May 23 – May 31
- Peak intensity: 165 km/h (105 mph) (1-min); 960 hPa (mbar)

Across the Philippines, 13 people were killed and another 14 were reported missing. Total damage in the country reached ₱4 million.

=== Tropical Storm Emma (Ising) ===
- Tropical storm (JMA)
- Tropical storm (SSHWS)
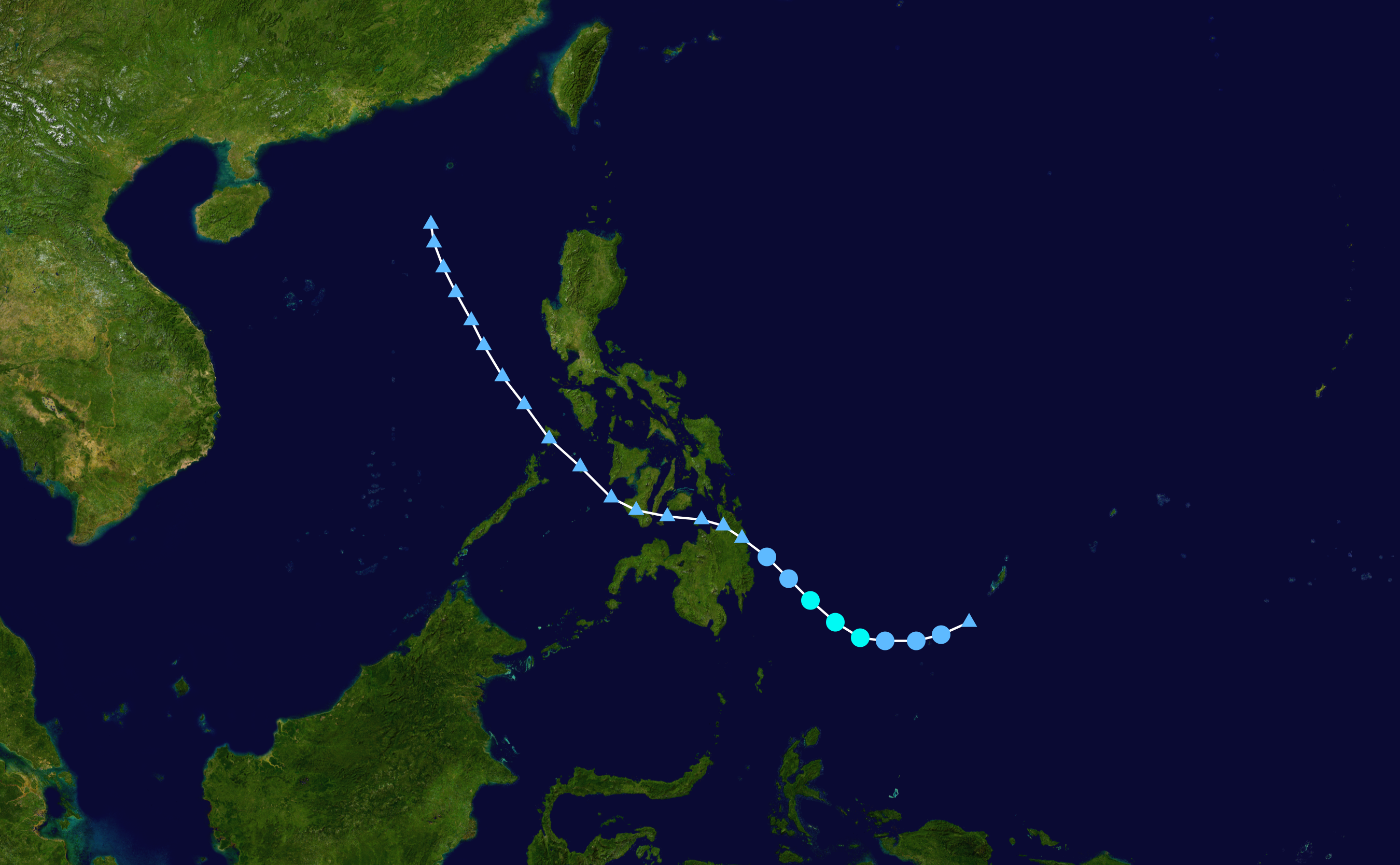
- Duration: May 27 – June 3
- Peak intensity: 65 km/h (40 mph) (1-min); 1000 hPa (mbar)

=== Typhoon Freda (Luding) ===
- Typhoon (JMA)
- Category 1-equivalent typhoon (SSHWS)
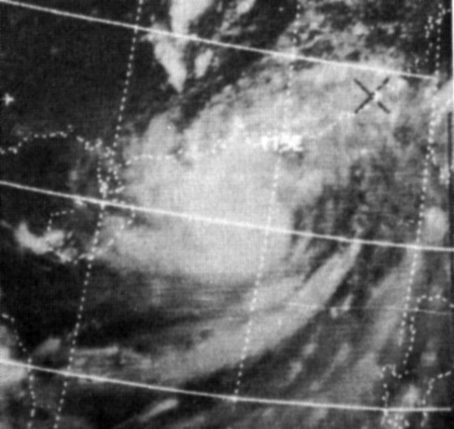
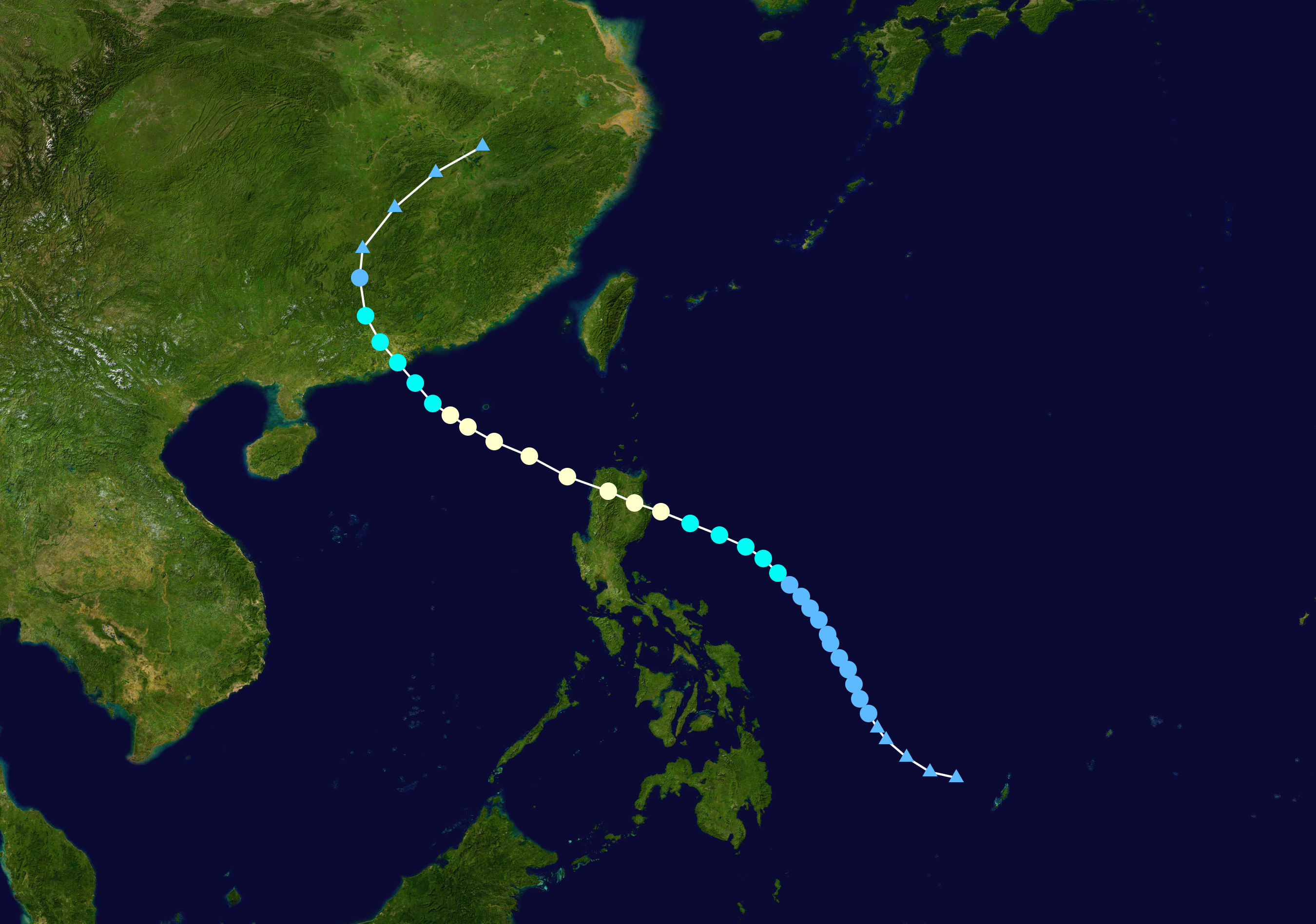
- Duration: June 9 – June 19
- Peak intensity: 140 km/h (85 mph) (1-min); 980 hPa (mbar)

=== Typhoon Gilda (Mameng) ===
- Typhoon (JMA)
- Category 2-equivalent typhoon (SSHWS)
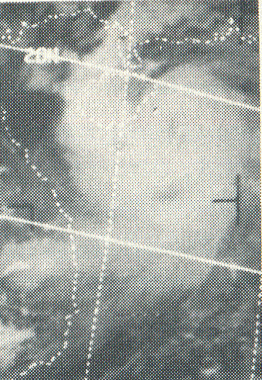
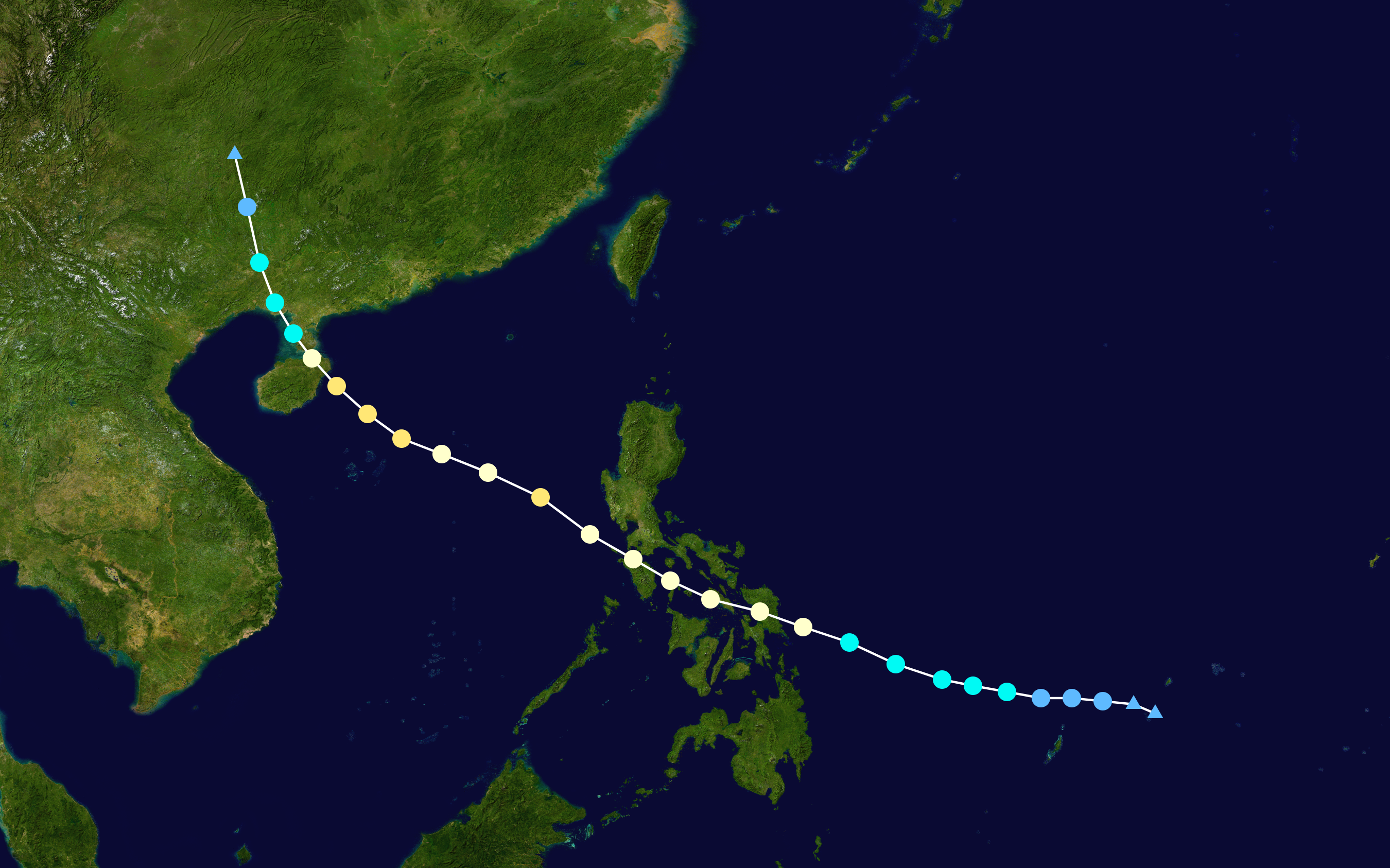
- Duration: June 22 – June 28
- Peak intensity: 165 km/h (105 mph) (1-min); 975 hPa (mbar)

One person was killed and damage reached ₱8 million across the Philippines.

=== Typhoon Harriet (Neneng) ===
- Typhoon (JMA)
- Category 4-equivalent typhoon (SSHWS)
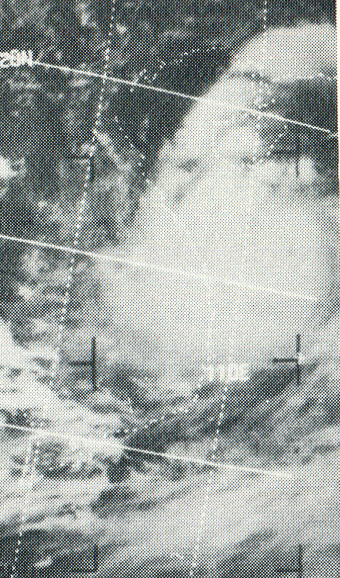
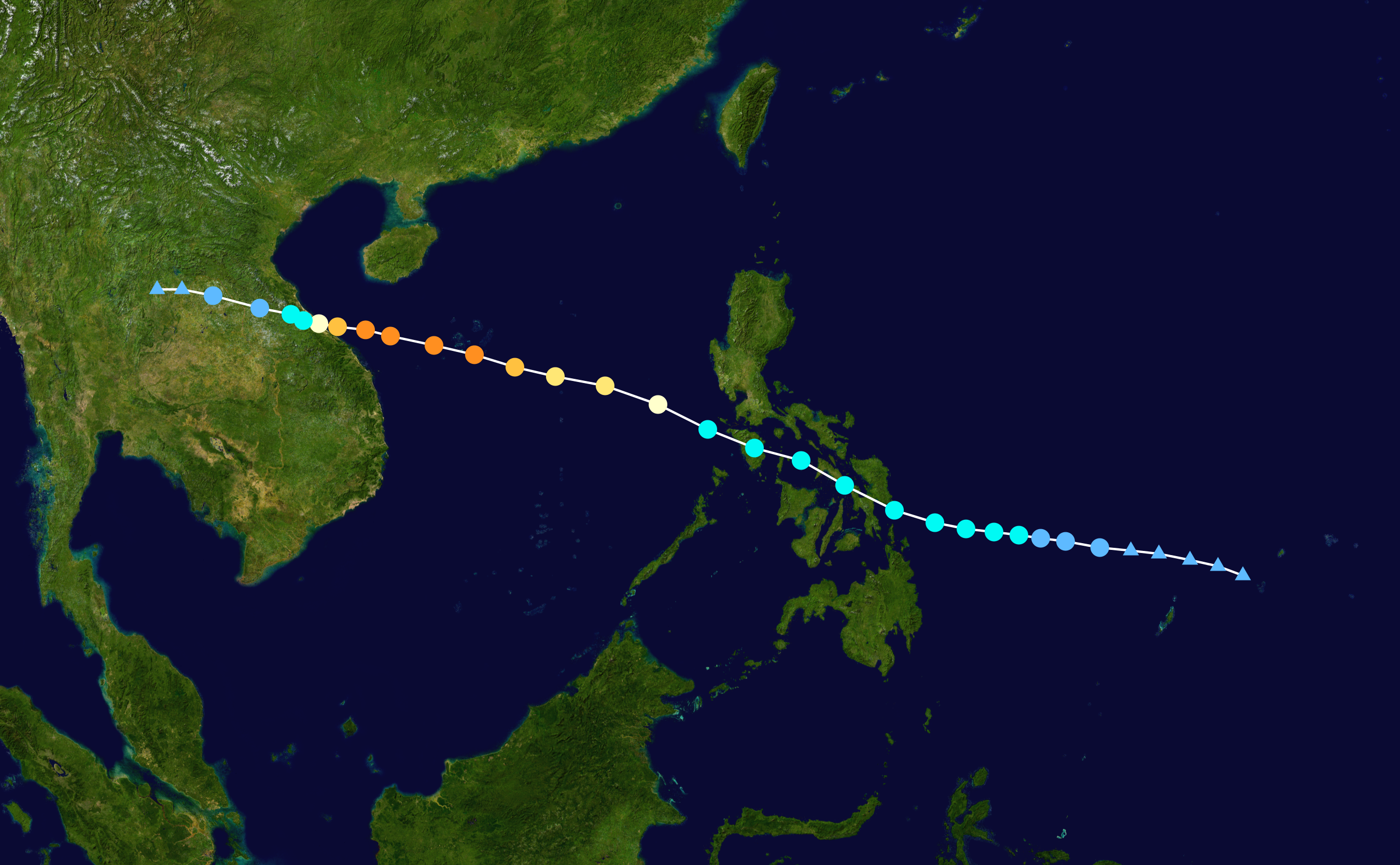
- Duration: June 30 – July 8
- Peak intensity: 230 km/h (145 mph) (1-min); 925 hPa (mbar)

Across the Philippines, Harriet was responsible for one fatality.

Striking near the demilitarized zone between North and South Vietnam as a powerful typhoon, Harriet caused significant disruptions to the Vietnam War. Military operations on both sides were temporarily halted, with all United States helicopters grounded. Ground movement was severely limited as well. Despite the intensity of the storm, damage was relatively light, with Camp Eagle reporting some roofs blown off from 120 km/h (75 mph) winds. In Đà Nẵng, between 8 and 10 in (200 and 250 mm) of rain fell and strong winds knocked out power to the area. A 24‑hour maximum rainfall of 10.16 in (258 mm) was measured in Camp Evans. Throughout Vietnam, four people were killed and fourteen others were reported missing. Thừa Thiên Province sustained the most significant damage, with 2,500 homes damaged or destroyed.

=== Severe Tropical Storm Ivy ===
- Severe tropical storm (JMA)
- Tropical storm (SSHWS)
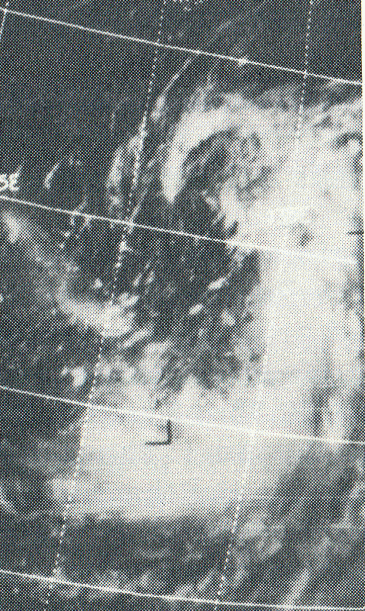
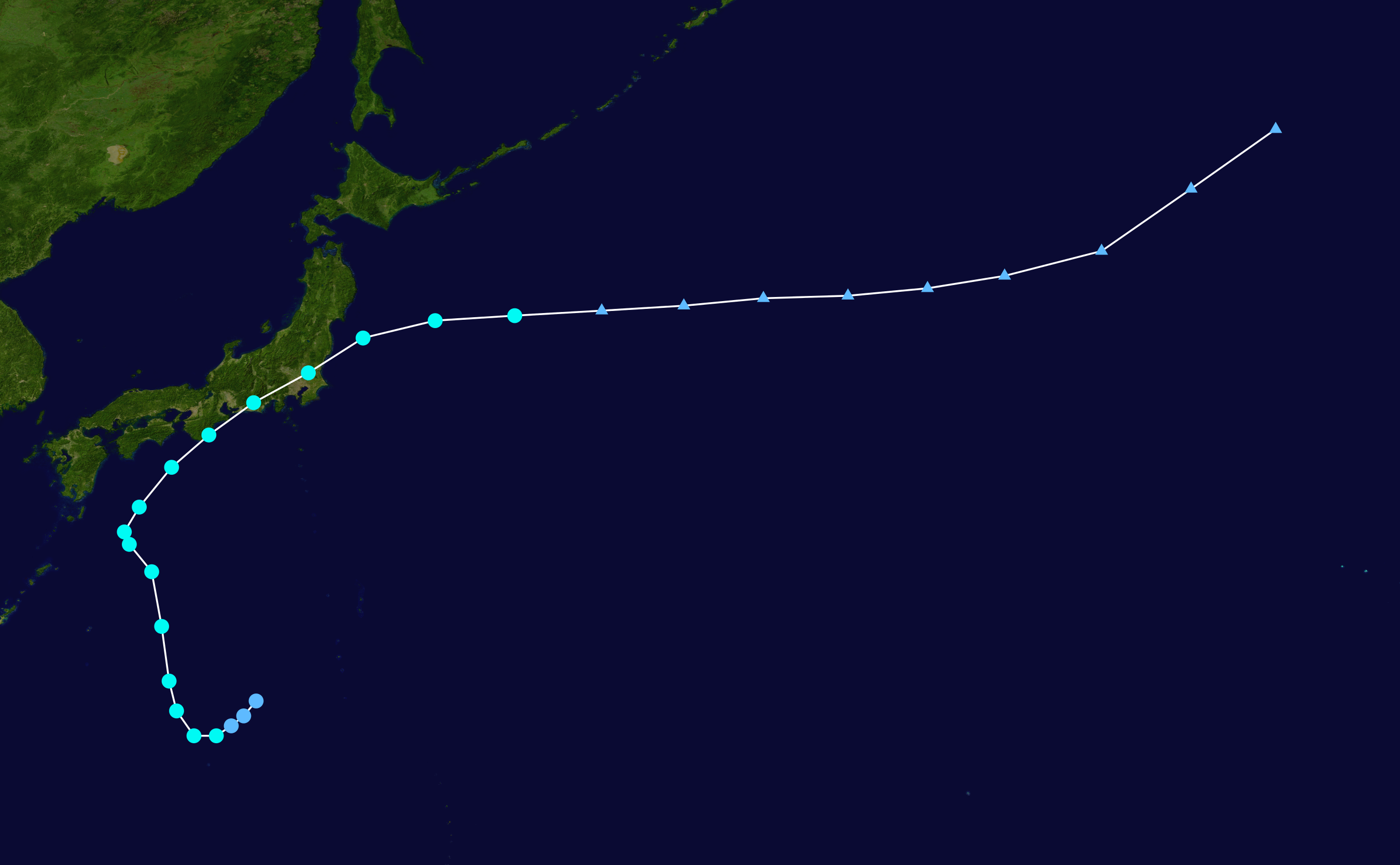
- Duration: July 4 – July 8
- Peak intensity: 110 km/h (70 mph) (1-min); 990 hPa (mbar)

Ivy struck Tokyo and caused floods remaining a tropical storm before moving out into open ocean and weakening to an extratropical storm. Ivy later dissipated

Spawned a multi vortex killer tornado that struck Omiya City while damaging many homes and buildings, the tornado killed 1 and injured 11 and it was rated as F3.

=== Severe Tropical Storm Kim (Oniang) ===
- Severe tropical storm (JMA)
- Tropical storm (SSHWS)
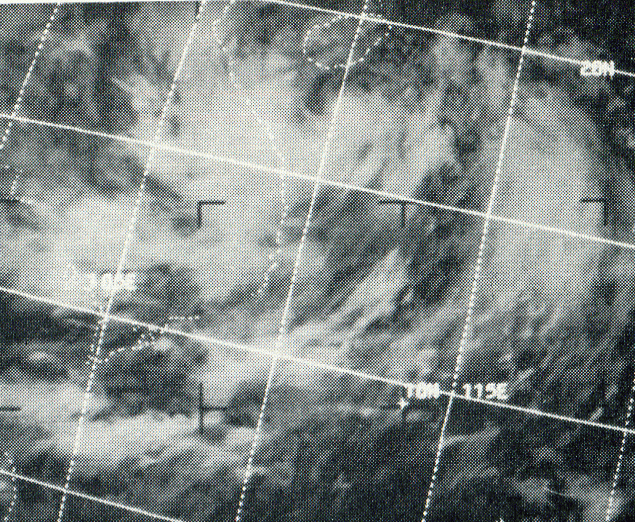
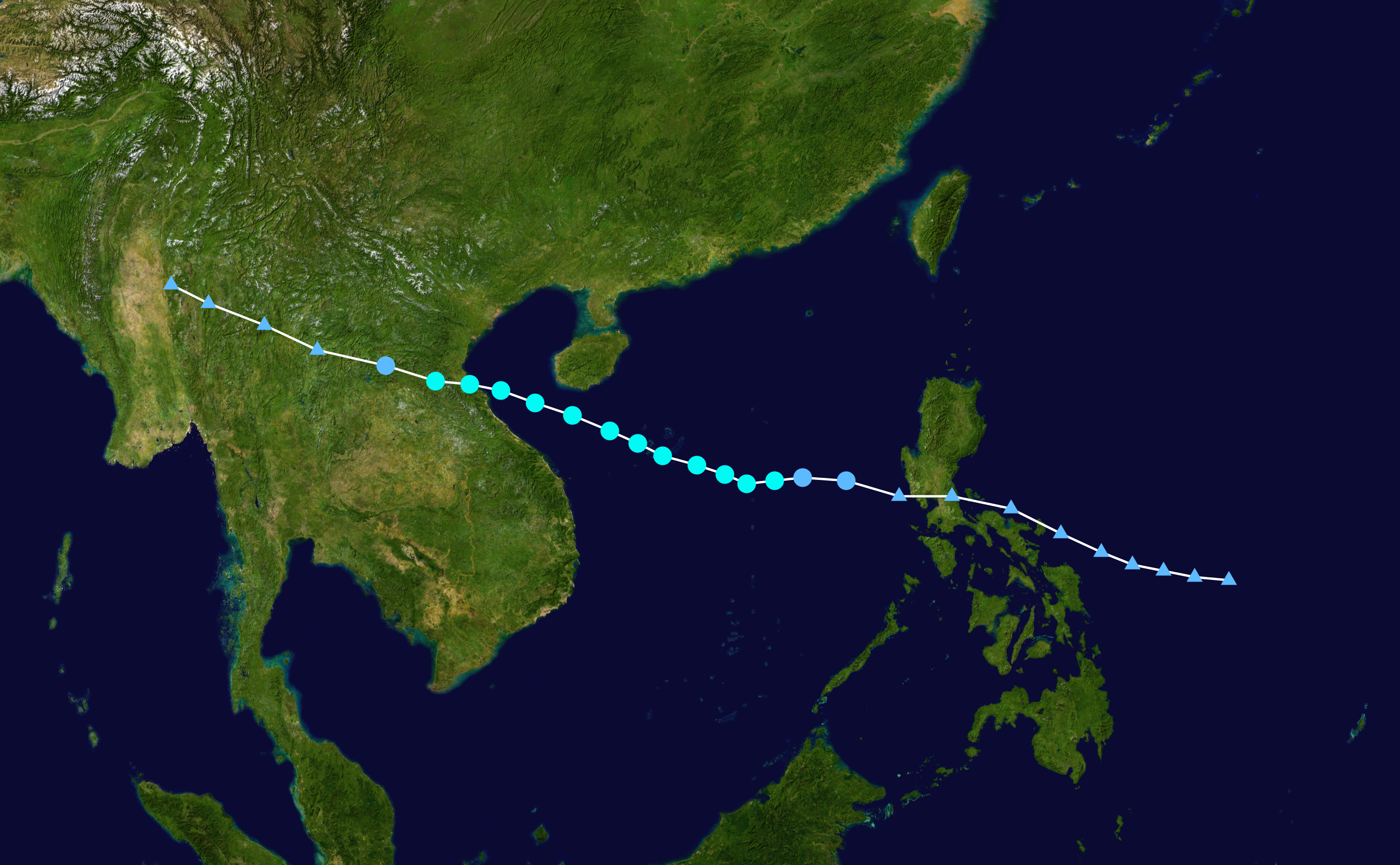
- Duration: July 8 – July 14
- Peak intensity: 95 km/h (60 mph) (1-min); 980 hPa (mbar)

=== Typhoon Jean (Pepang) ===
- Typhoon (JMA)
- Category 2-equivalent typhoon (SSHWS)
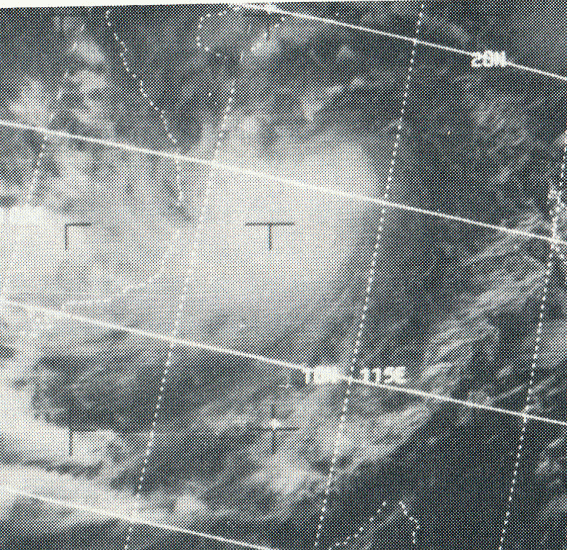
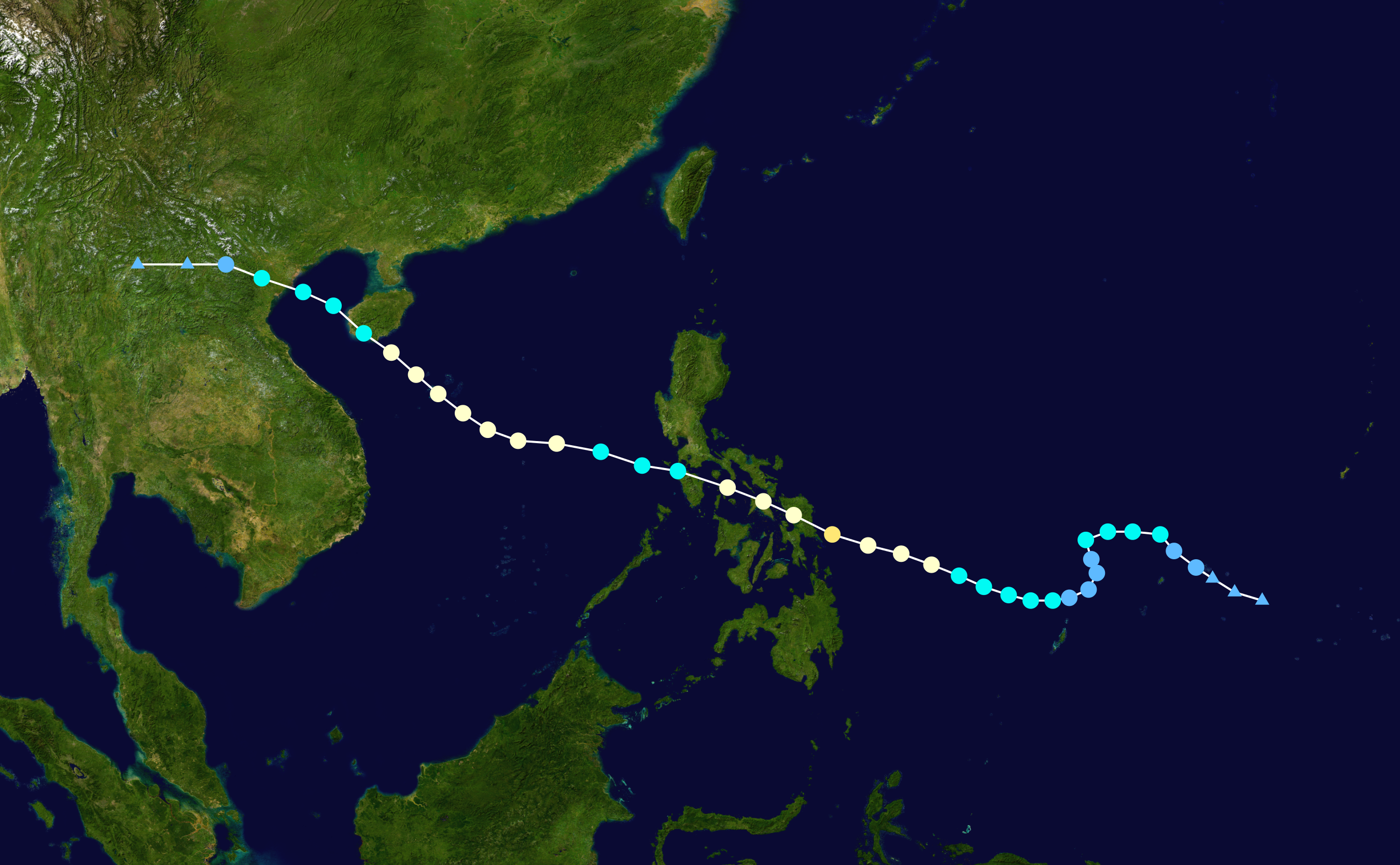
- Duration: July 8 – July 19
- Peak intensity: 155 km/h (100 mph) (1-min); 975 hPa (mbar)

=== Typhoon Lucy (Rosing) ===
- Typhoon (JMA)
- Category 4 super typhoon (SSHWS)
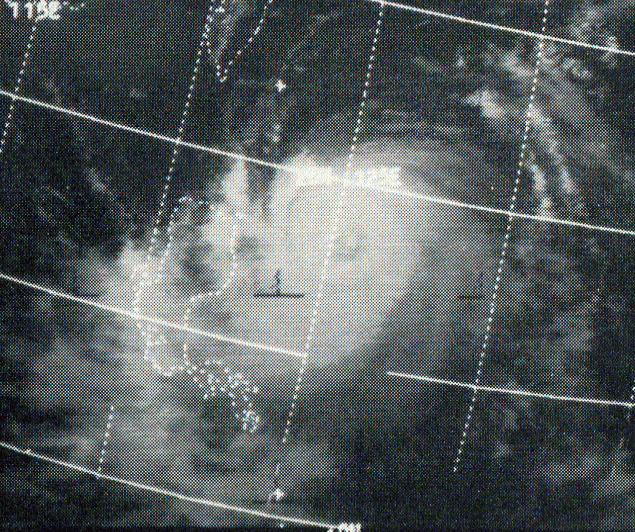
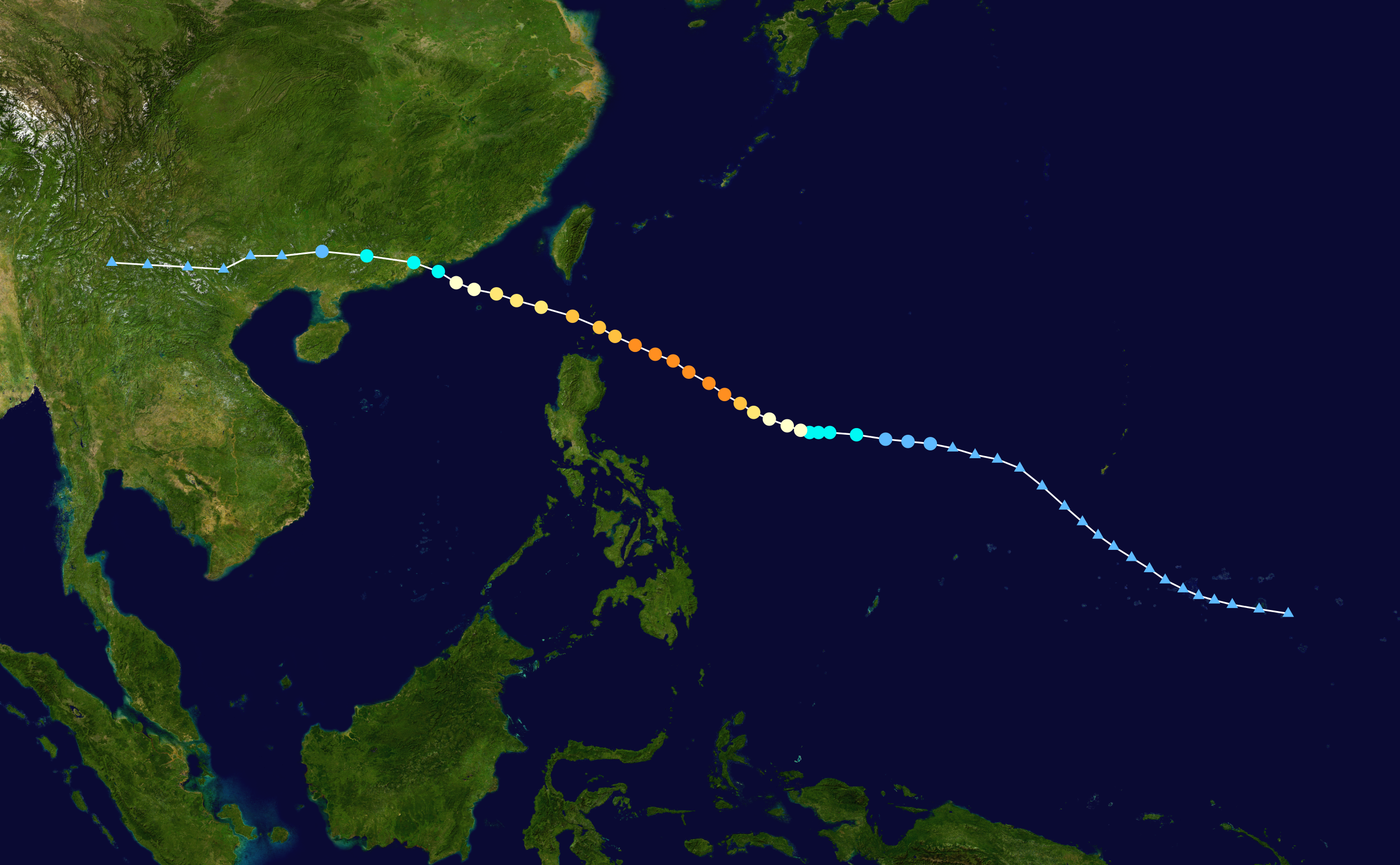
- Duration: July 13 – July 24
- Peak intensity: 240 km/h (150 mph) (1-min); 910 hPa (mbar)

The strongest typhoon to strike the Philippines that year, this cyclone moved towards the region from the Marianas as a slow pace. Gusty southwest winds impacted western portions of Visayas and Luzon, including Manila, as the cyclone passed by on the 21st. The highest winds recorded were 190 kilometres per hour (100 kn) at Basco in Batanes. Heavy rains caused by the strong onshore flow led to heavy rains, which peaked at 379.5 millimetres (14.94 in) at Baguio City within 24 hours. The heavy rains led to severe flooding and landslides in north-central sections of the Philippines.

=== Typhoon Mary ===
- Typhoon (JMA)
- Category 1-equivalent typhoon (SSHWS)
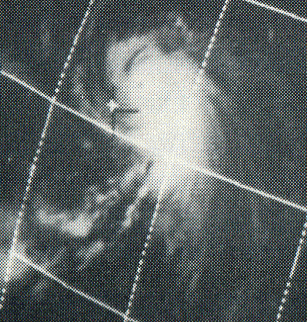
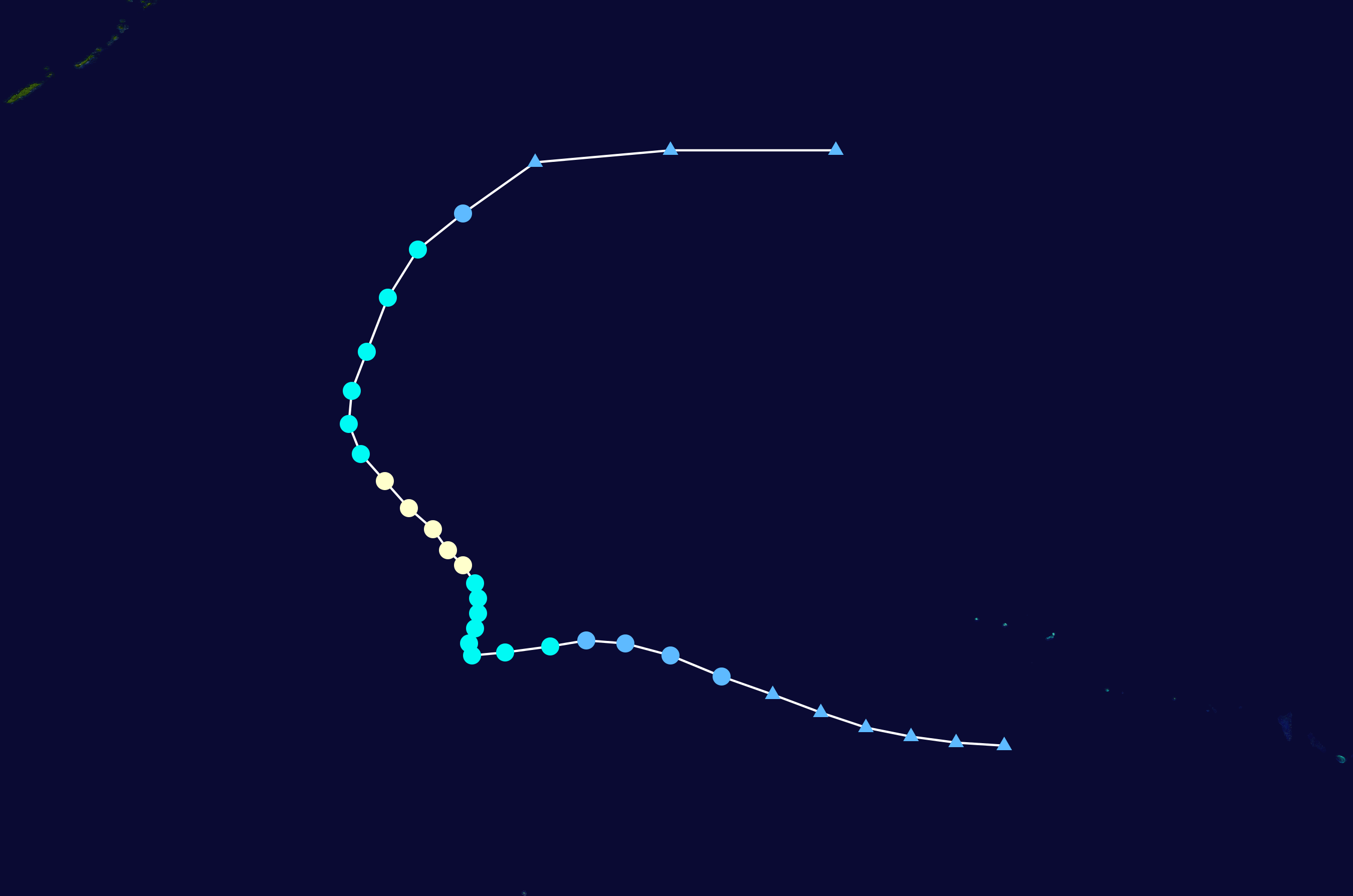
- Duration: July 16 – July 21
- Peak intensity: 150 km/h (90 mph) (1-min); 975 hPa (mbar)

=== Typhoon Nadine (Sisang) ===
- Typhoon (JMA)
- Category 5-equivalent super typhoon (SSHWS)
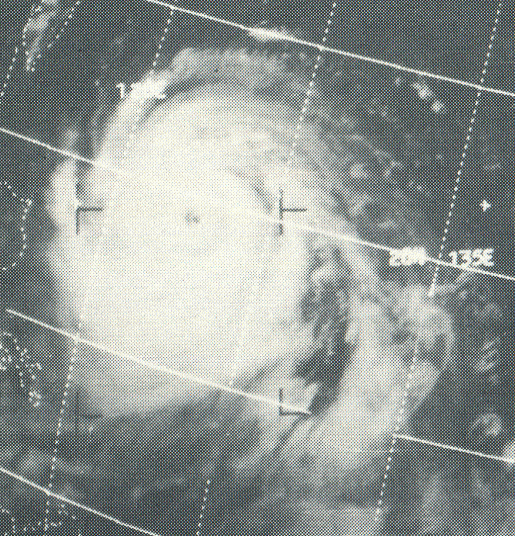
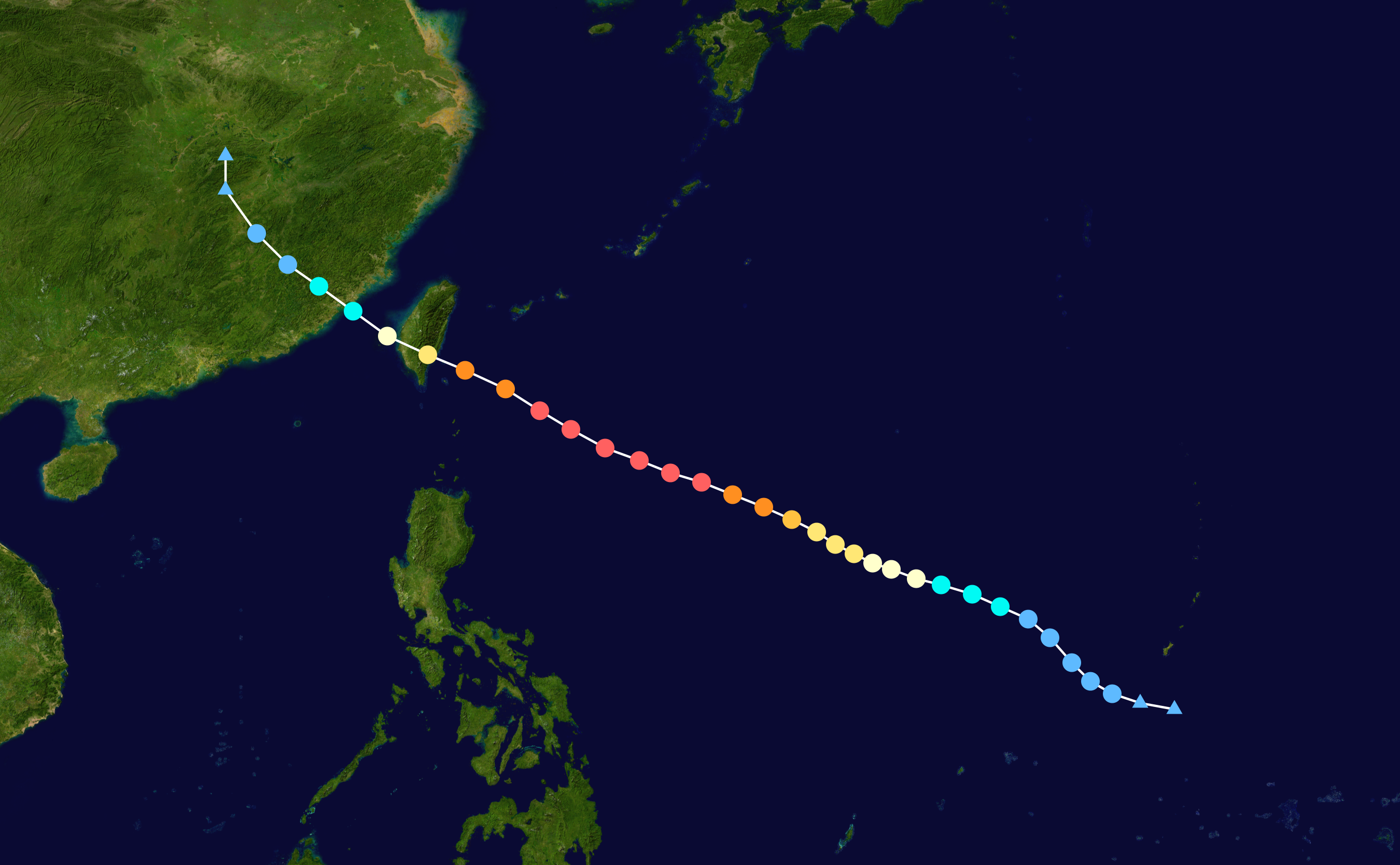
- Duration: July 19 – July 27
- Peak intensity: 280 km/h (175 mph) (1-min); 900 hPa (mbar)

Typhoon Nadine, which formed on July 20, rapidly intensified to a peak of 175 mph (282 km/h) on the 24th. It weakened slightly as it continued its northwest movement, and struck eastern Taiwan on the 25th with winds of over 100 mph (200 km/h). Nadine dissipated the next day over China, after causing 28 deaths (with 25 missing) and heavy damage on Taiwan from the flooding. Nadine also caused the crash of a Pan American cargo aircraft, killing all four people in the crew.

=== Typhoon Olive ===
- Typhoon (JMA)
- Category 2-equivalent typhoon (SSHWS)
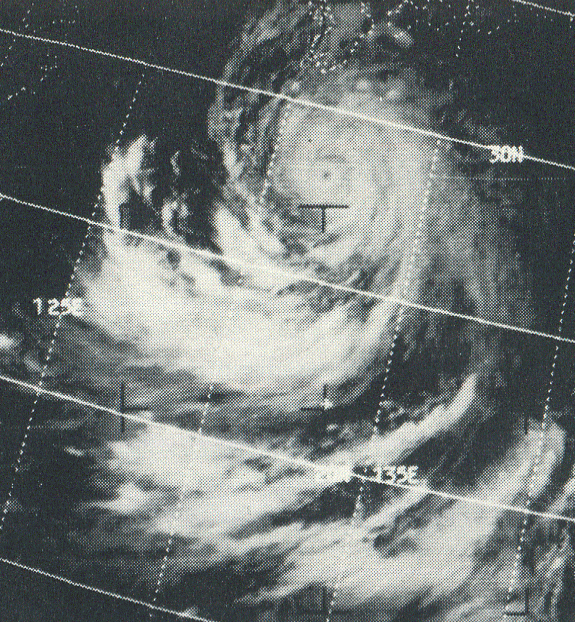
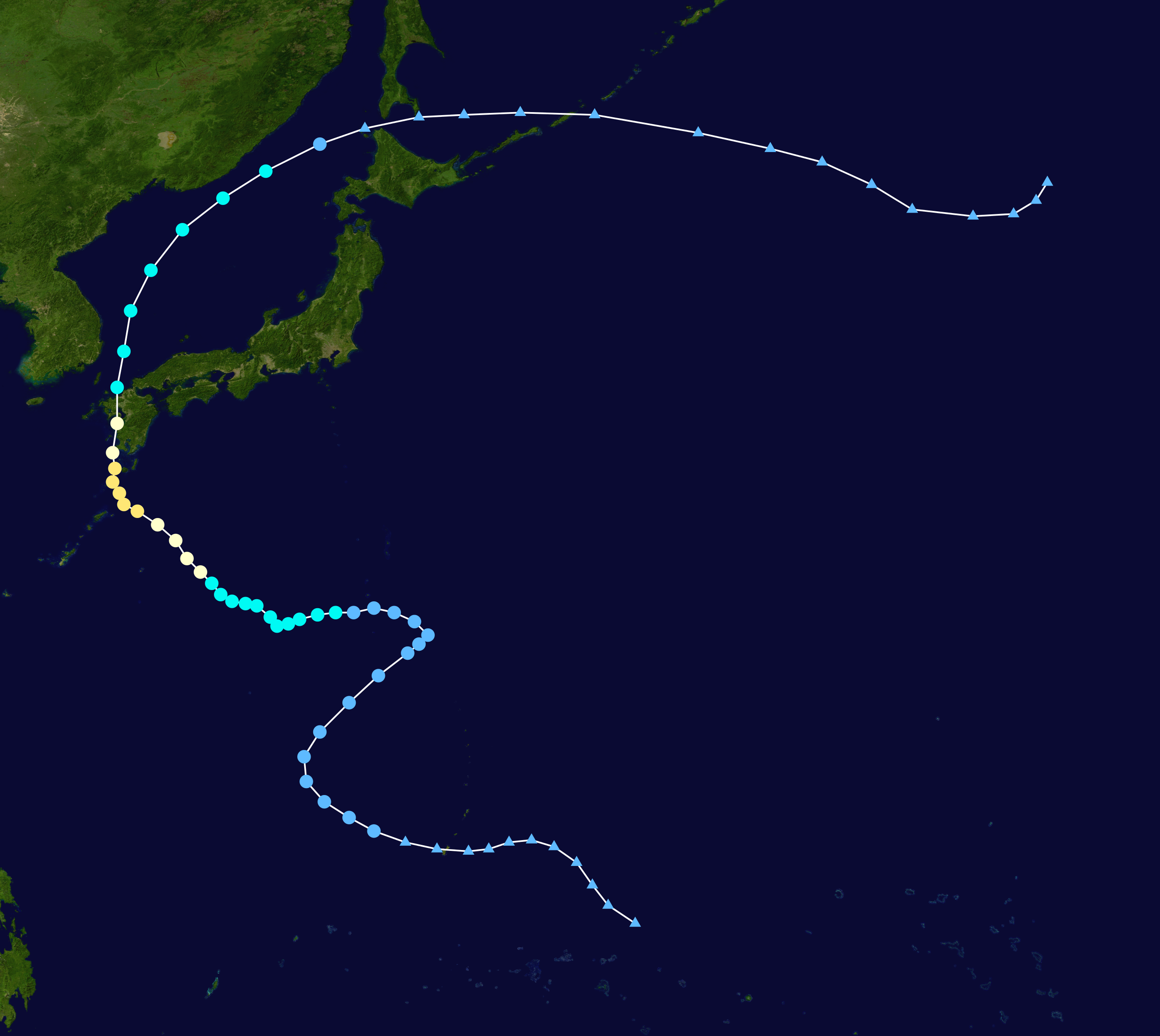
- Duration: July 24 – August 7
- Peak intensity: 155 km/h (100 mph) (1-min); 935 hPa (mbar)

85 mph (137 km/h) Typhoon Olive, which developed on July 29 from the near equatorial trough, hit southwestern Japan on August 4. It continued northward, and became extratropical in the Sea of Japan. Olive's heavy rains resulted in numerous mudslides, killing 69 people. It disrupted the Boy Scout XIII World Jamboree, being held in Japan.

=== Severe Tropical Storm Polly (Trining) ===
- Severe tropical storm (JMA)
- Tropical storm (SSHWS)
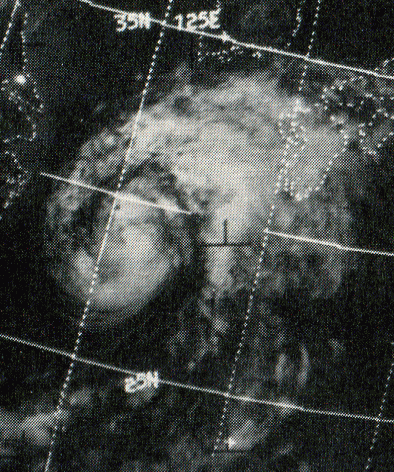
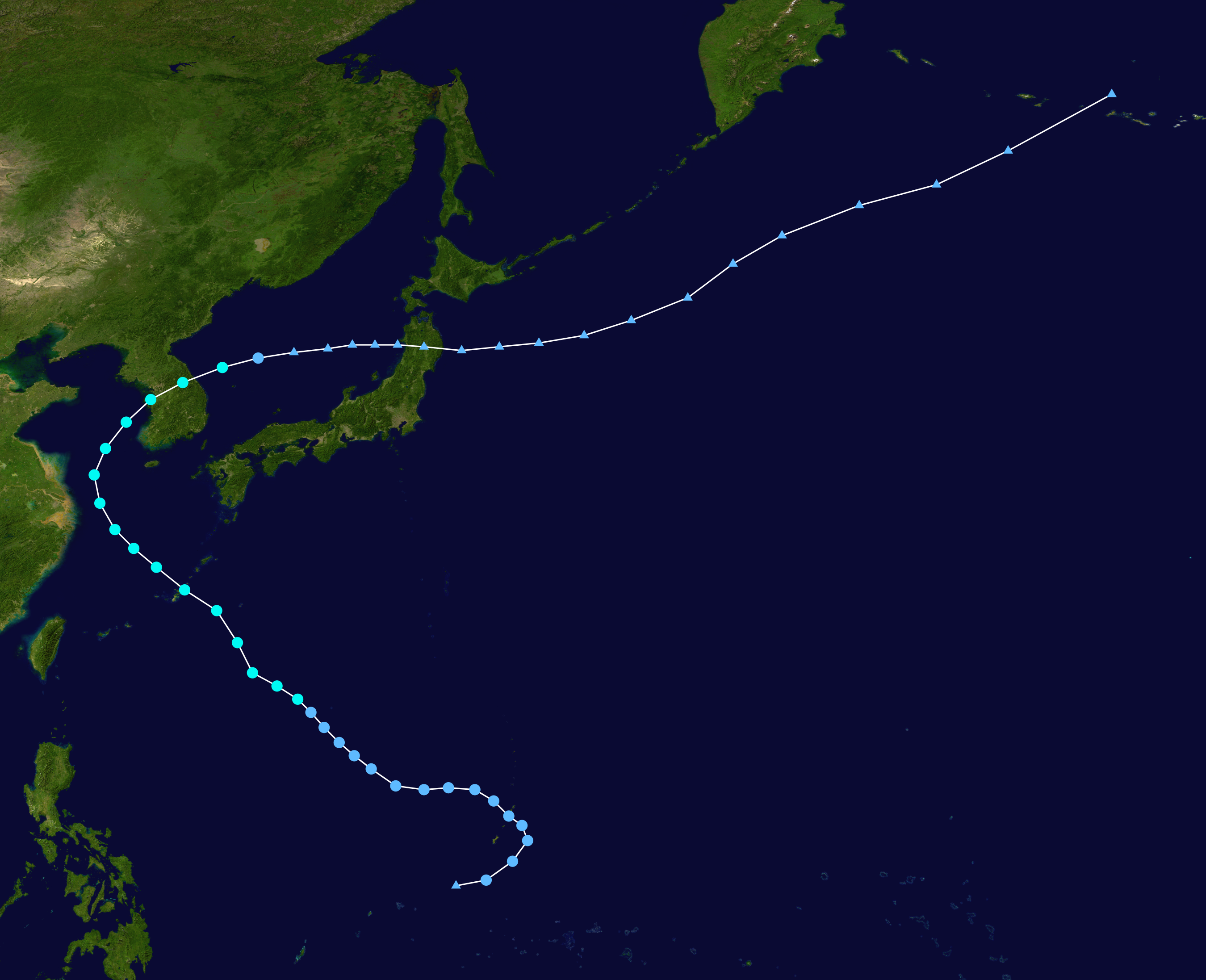
- Duration: August 3 – August 11
- Peak intensity: 75 km/h (45 mph) (1-min); 980 hPa (mbar)

=== Typhoon Rose (Uring) ===
- Typhoon (JMA)
- Category 4-equivalent typhoon (SSHWS)
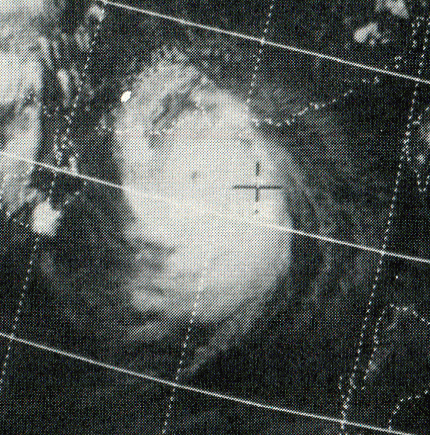
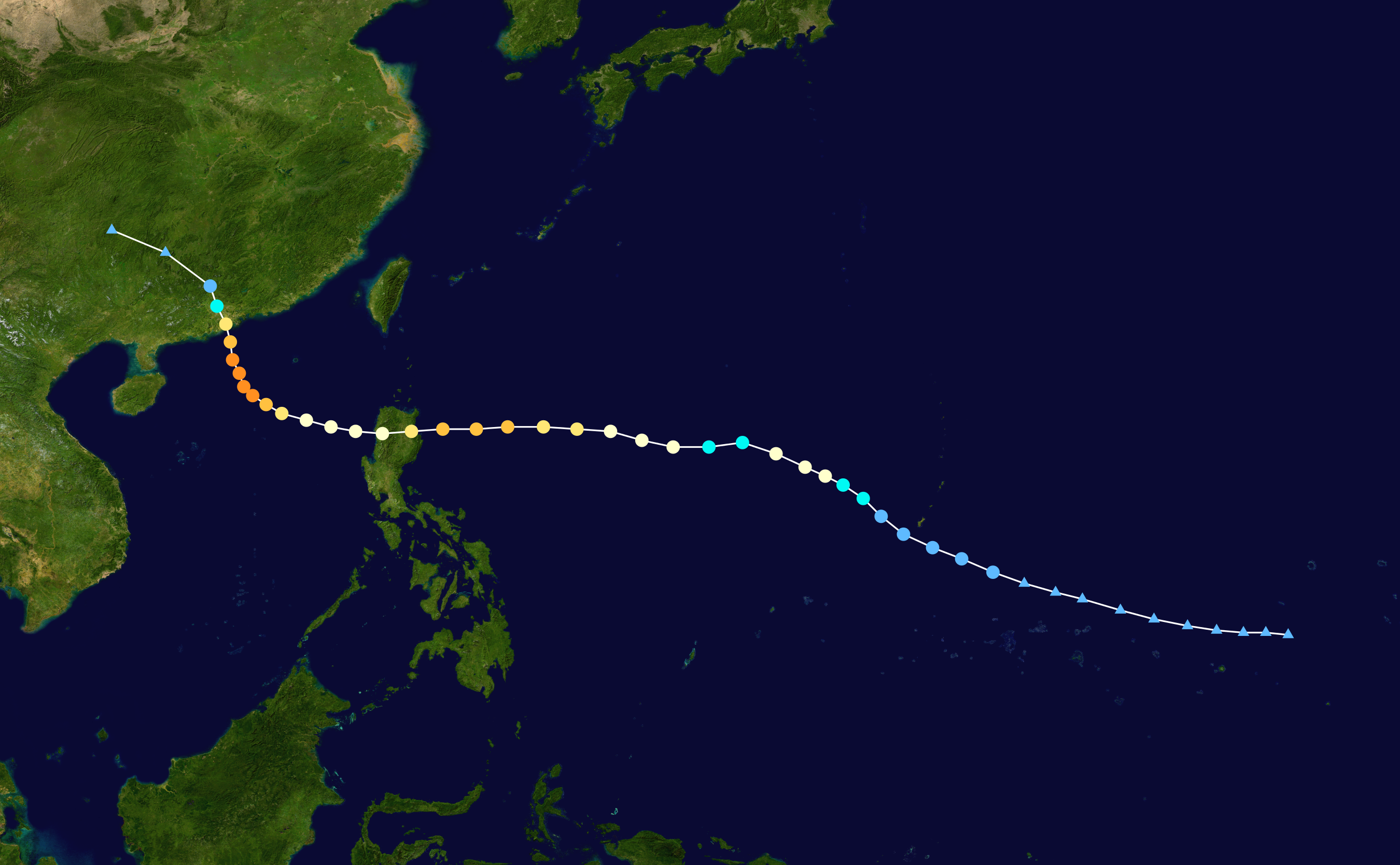
- Duration: August 6 – August 17
- Peak intensity: 220 km/h (140 mph) (1-min); 960 hPa (mbar)

A small circulation near Chuuk organized into Tropical Storm Rose on August 10. An extremely small cyclone with a wind field of 150 nautical miles (280 km) across, Rose quickly strengthened, and became a typhoon later that day. It briefly weakened to a tropical storm on the 11th, but restrengthened to a typhoon as it continued westward. On August 13, Typhoon Rose made landfall on Palanan, Isabela with winds of 130 mph (210 km/h). It weakened to a minimal typhoon over the mountainous terrain, but after reemerging in the South China Sea, Rose rapidly intensified, and peaked at 140 mph (230 km/h) winds on the 16th. As it approached the coast of Hong Kong, the inflow became disrupted, but Rose still hit as a 100 mph (200 km/h) typhoon on the 16th. The typhoon dissipated the next day, after causing 130 deaths in Hong Kong and leaving 5,600 people homeless. A Macao ferry was capsized, resulting in the loss of its 88-person crew.

=== Typhoon Shirley ===
- Typhoon (JMA)
- Category 2-equivalent typhoon (SSHWS)
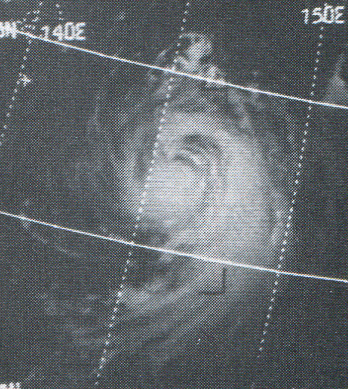
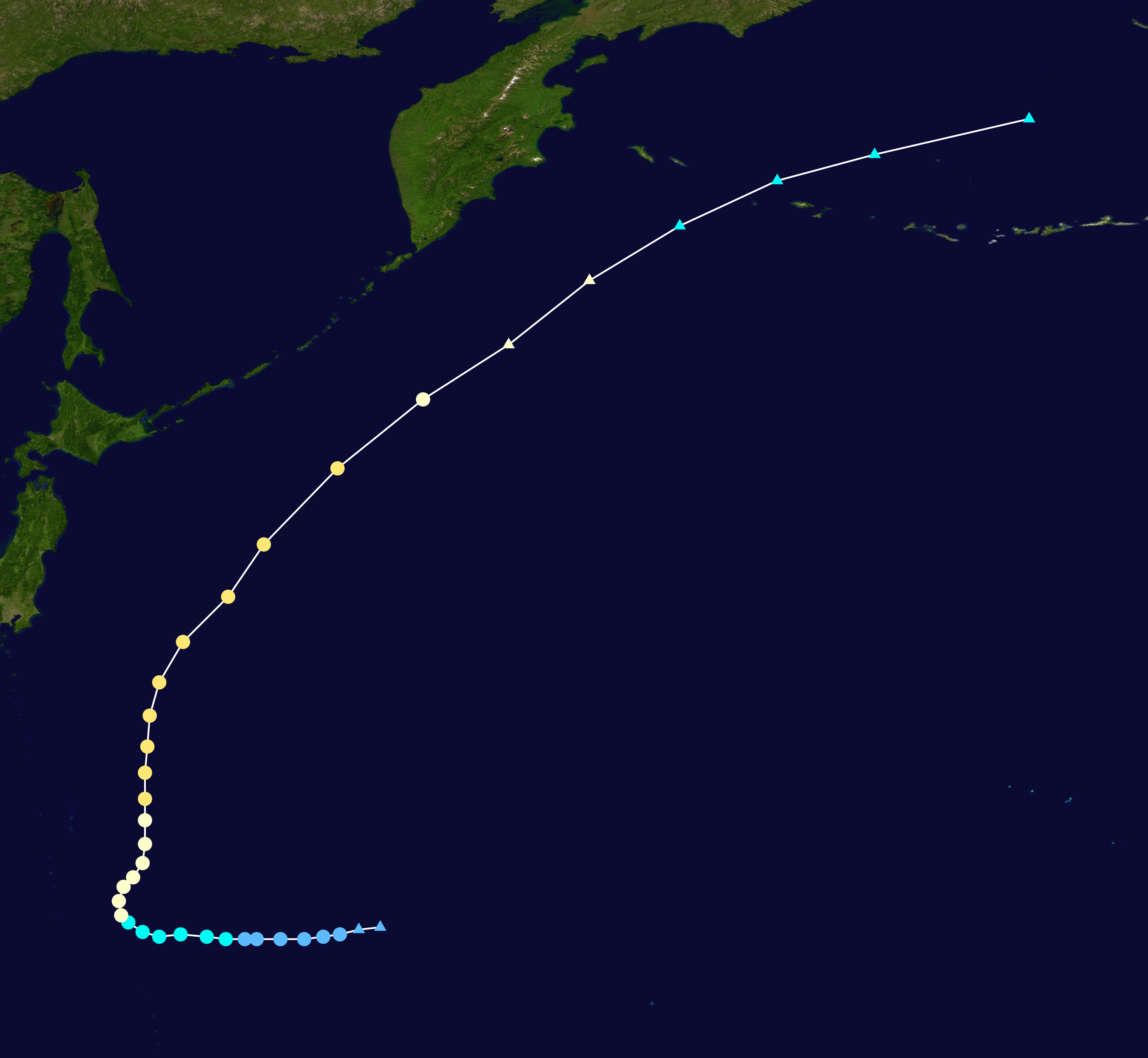
- Duration: August 10 – August 17
- Peak intensity: 165 km/h (105 mph) (1-min); 955 hPa (mbar)

=== Typhoon Trix ===
- Typhoon (JMA)
- Category 3-equivalent typhoon (SSHWS)
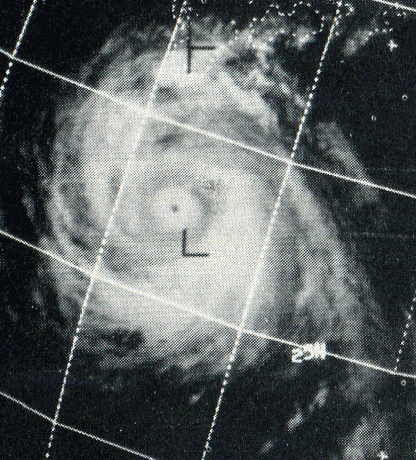
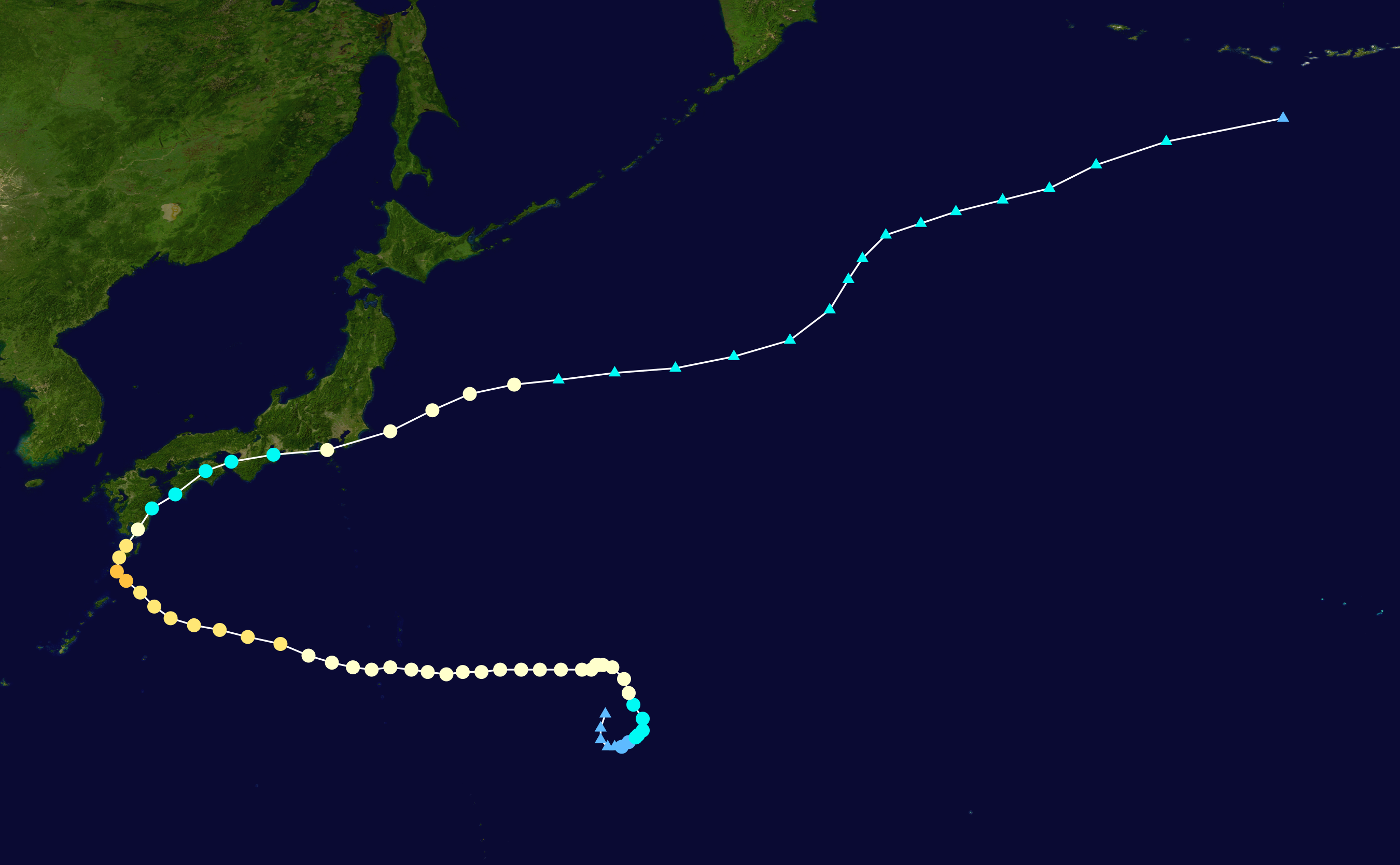
- Duration: August 19 – September 1
- Peak intensity: 185 km/h (115 mph) (1-min); 915 hPa (mbar)

An upper-level low contributed to the birth of Tropical Storm Trix on August 20. After drifting northward, the storm turned to the west in response to the building of the subtropical ridge. Trix slowly strengthened after becoming a typhoon on the 21st, and reached a peak of 115 mph (185 km/h) winds on the 28th. Trix recurved, and struck southwestern Japan on the 29th as a 95 mph (153 km/h) typhoon. It accelerated to the northeast, and became extratropical on the 30th. Just weeks after Typhoon Olive, Trix dropped more heavy rain to the country, in one case as much as 43 inches (1,100 mm) of rain. Trix caused 44 deaths, with heavy crop damage amounting to $50.6 million.

=== Tropical Storm 25W ===
- Tropical storm (JMA)
- Tropical depression (SSHWS)
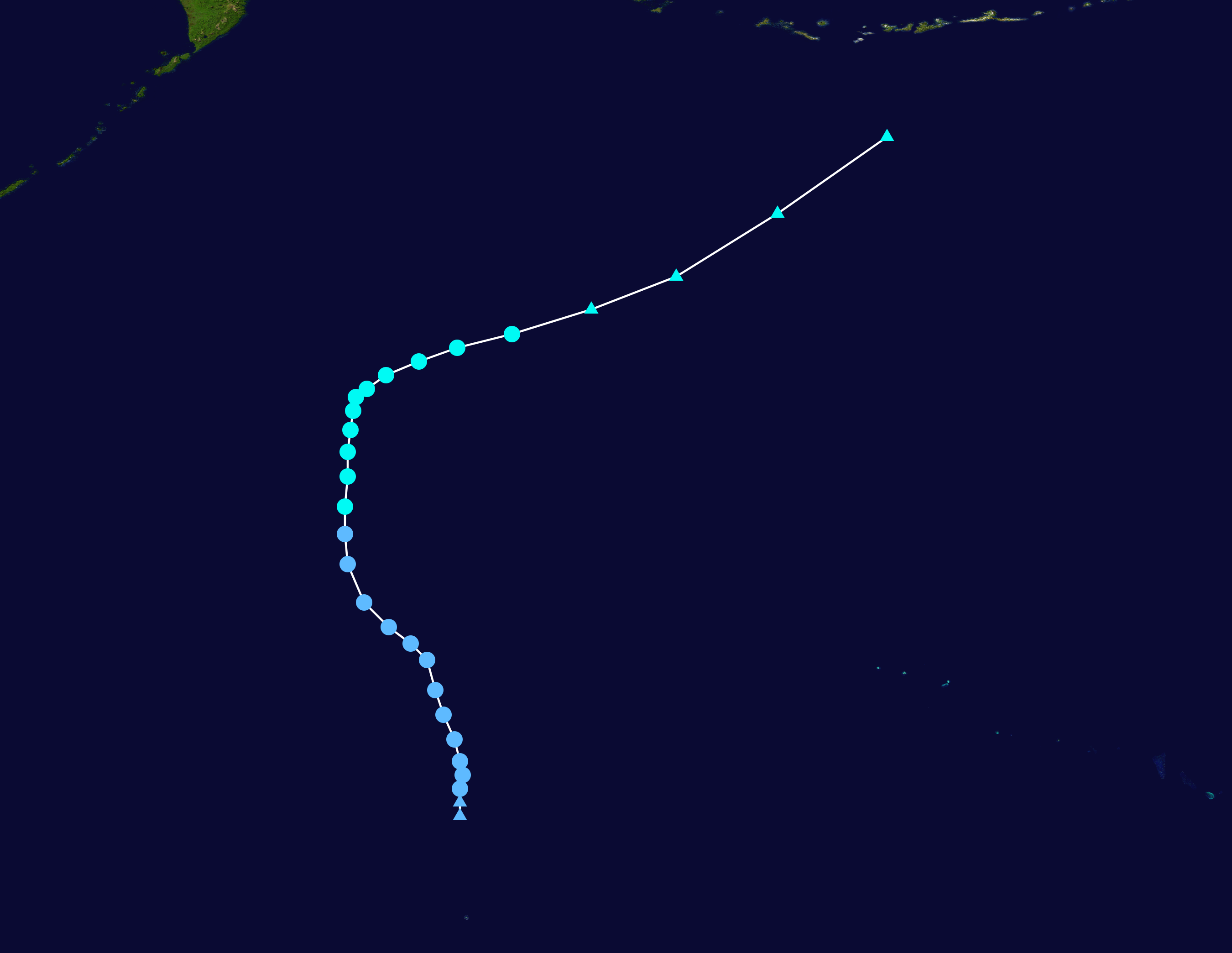
- Duration: August 23 – August 29
- Peak intensity: 55 km/h (35 mph) (1-min); 992 hPa (mbar)

=== Typhoon Virginia ===
- Typhoon (JMA)
- Category 3-equivalent typhoon (SSHWS)
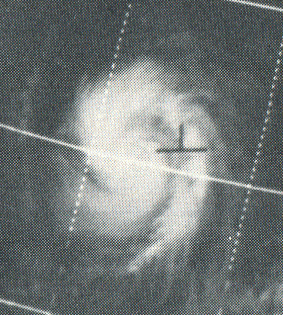
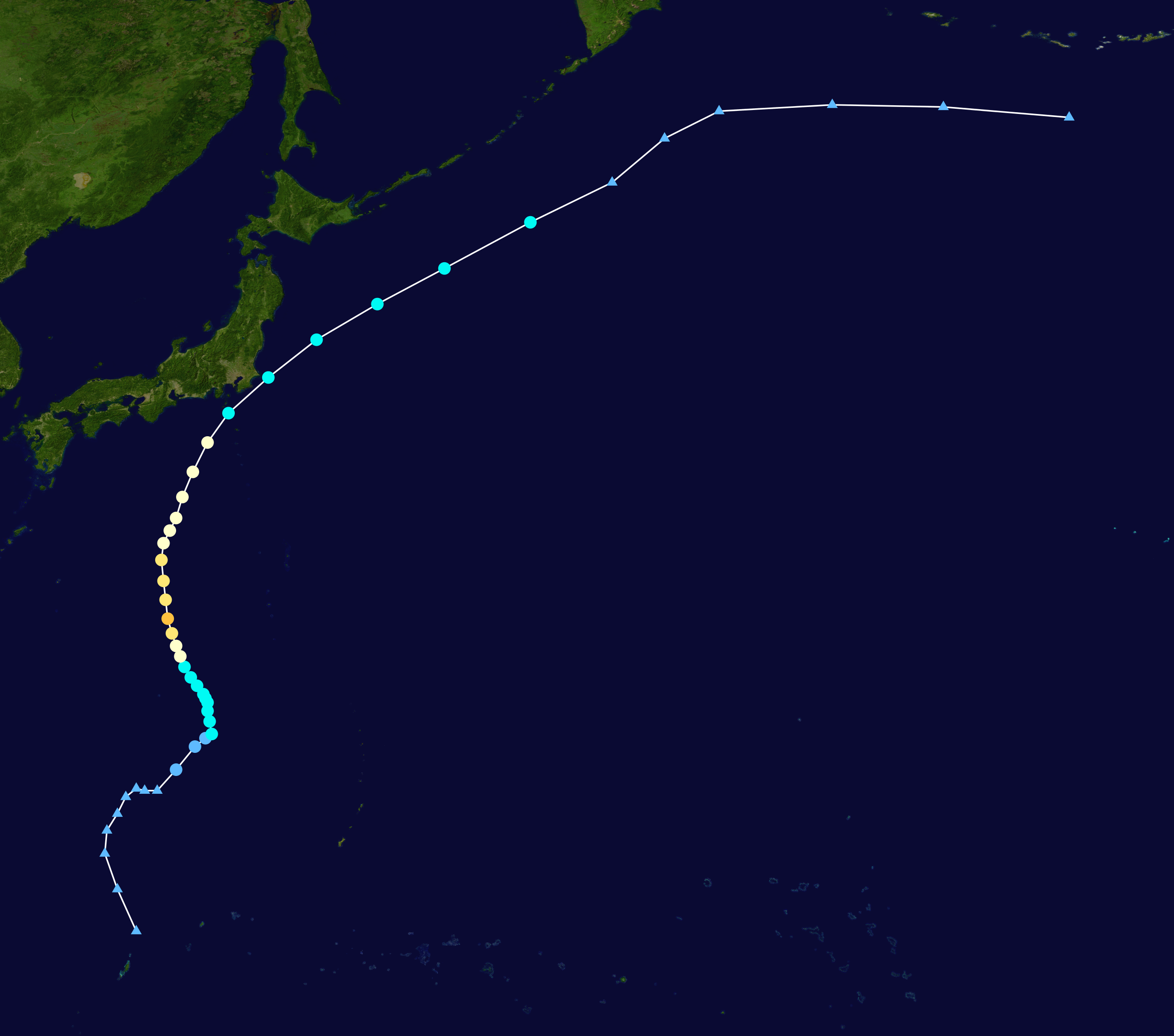
- Duration: September 1 – September 8
- Peak intensity: 185 km/h (115 mph) (1-min); 955 hPa (mbar)

Within one month of Typhoons Trix and Olive, Typhoon Virginia came up the Japanese coast with winds of 80 mph (130 km/h). It became extratropical on September 7 just east of Japan, after dropping more heavy rain causing 56 casualties from numerous landslides.

=== Typhoon Wendy ===
- Typhoon (JMA)
- Category 5-equivalent super typhoon (SSHWS)
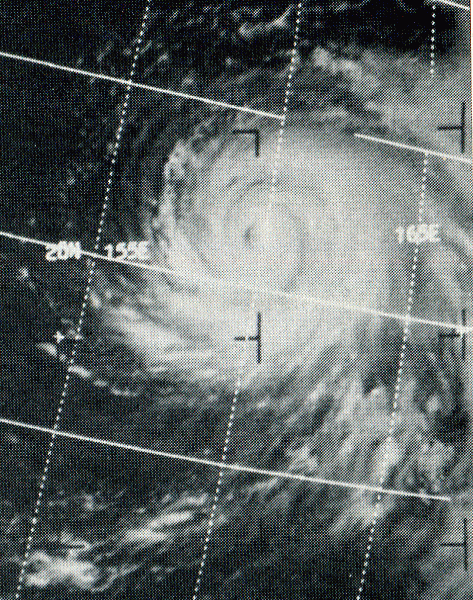
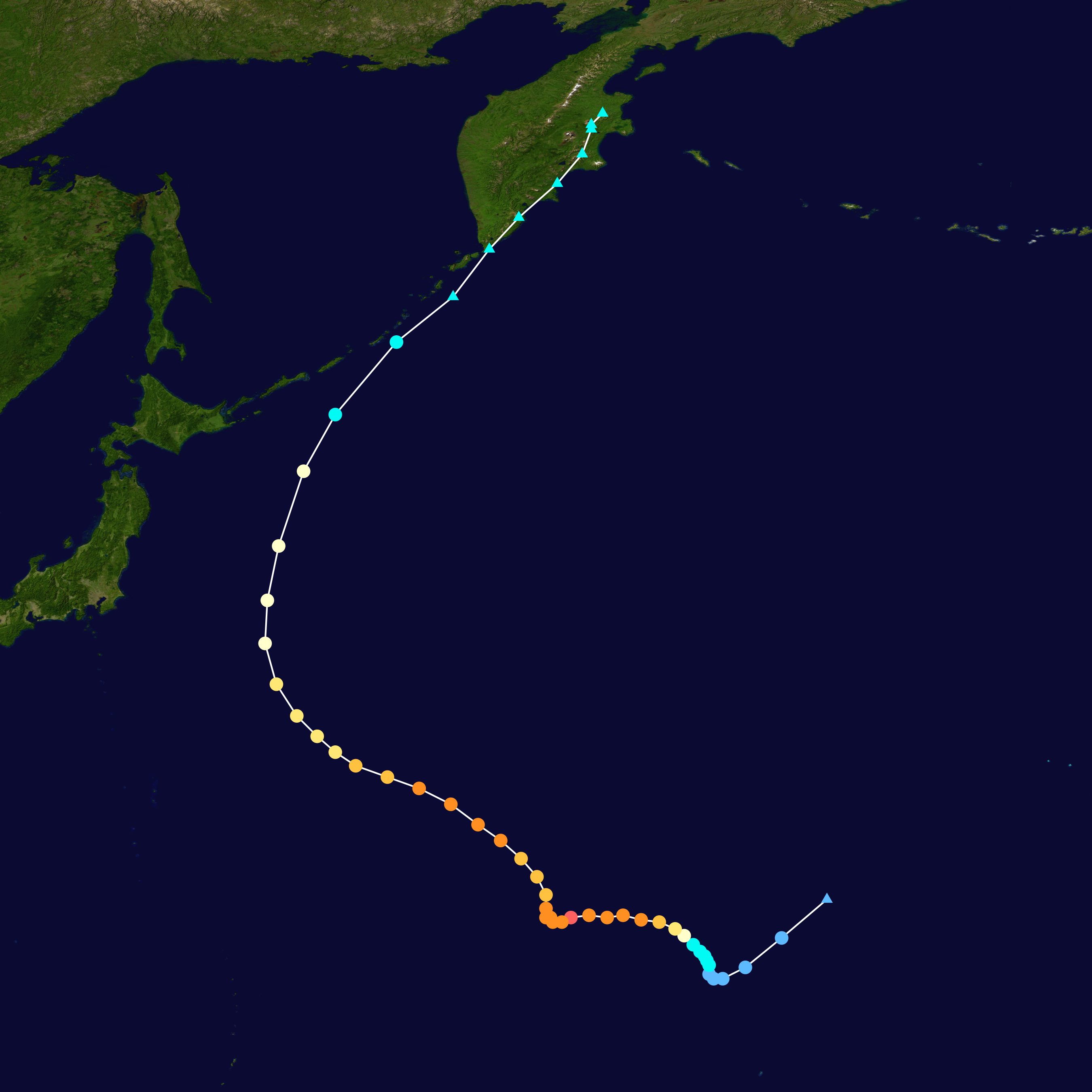
- Duration: September 4 – September 13
- Peak intensity: 260 km/h (160 mph) (1-min); 915 hPa (mbar)

=== Tropical Depression 28W ===
- Tropical depression (JMA)
- Tropical depression (SSHWS)
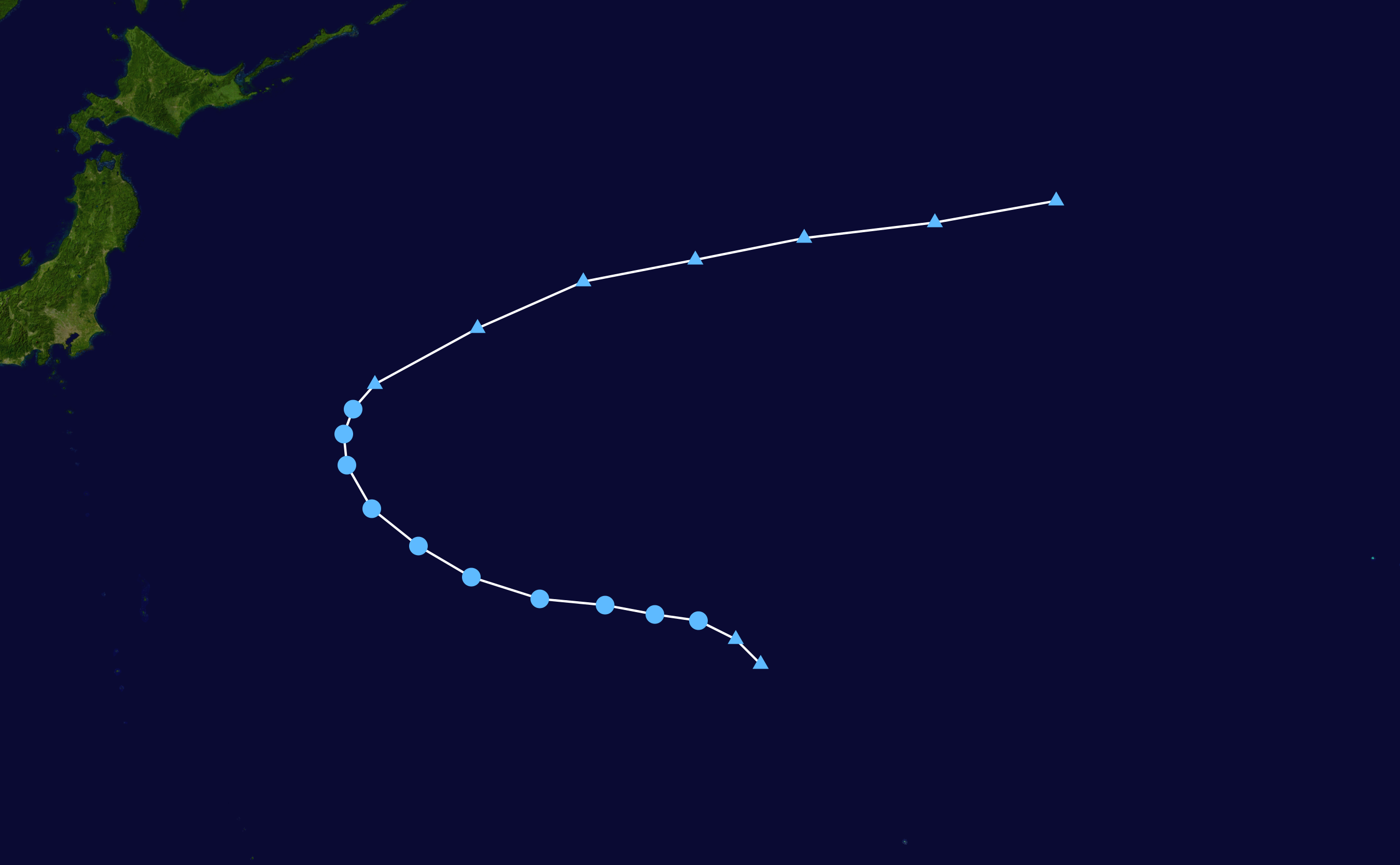
- Duration: September 13 – September 15
- Peak intensity: 45 km/h (30 mph) (1-min); 996 hPa (mbar)

=== Typhoon Agnes (Warling) ===
- Typhoon (JMA)
- Category 1-equivalent typhoon (SSHWS)
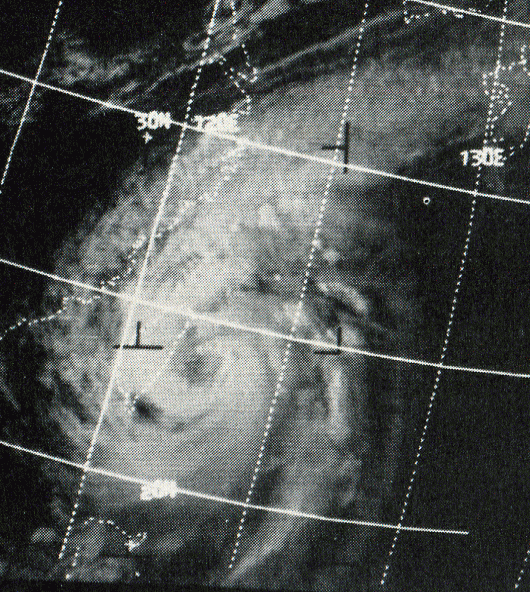
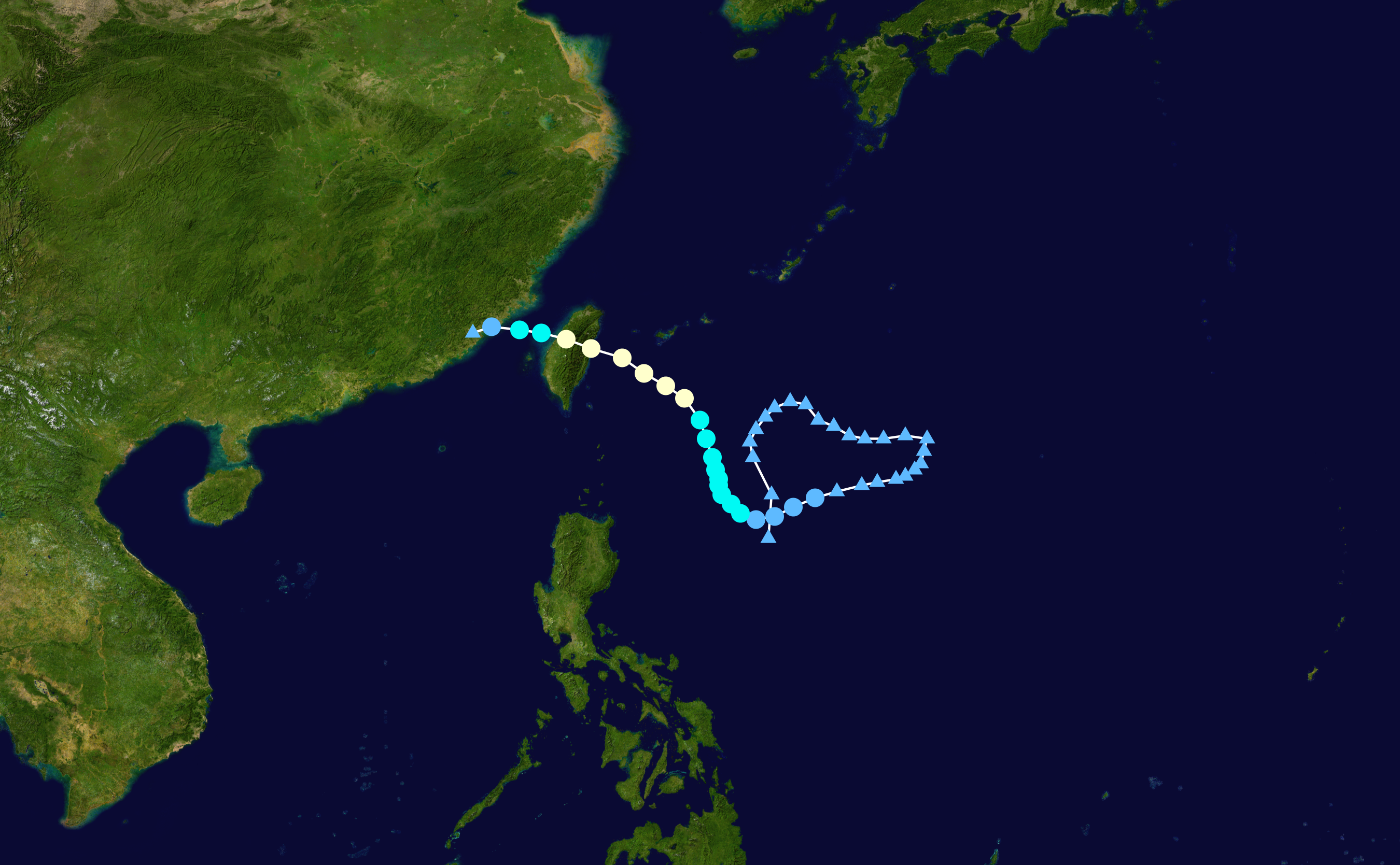
- Duration: September 10 – September 19
- Peak intensity: 140 km/h (85 mph) (1-min); 975 hPa (mbar)

=== Typhoon Bess (Yayang) ===
- Typhoon (JMA)
- Category 5-equivalent super typhoon (SSHWS)
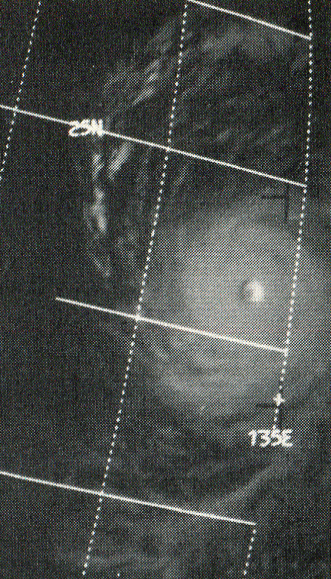
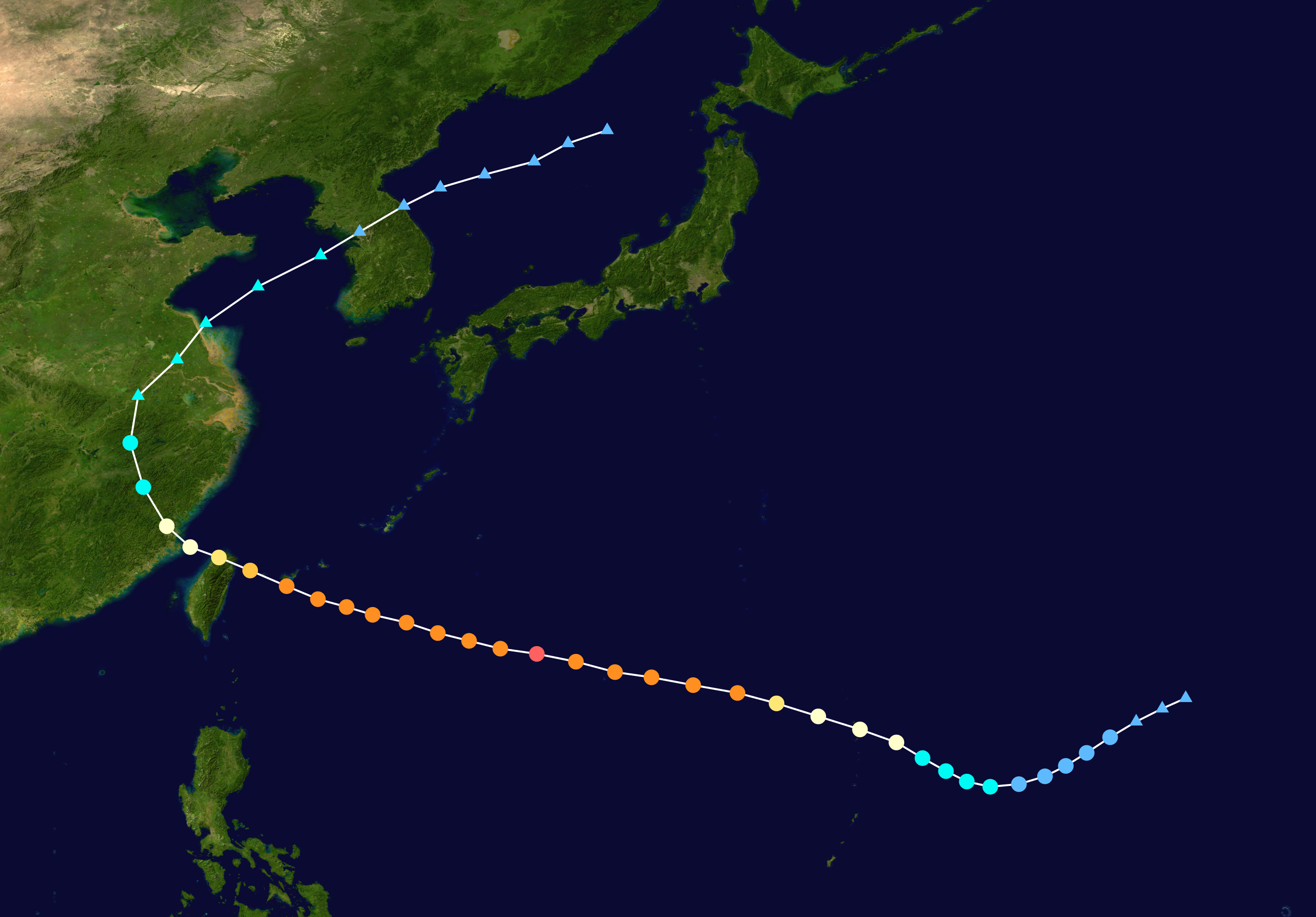
- Duration: September 16 – September 23
- Peak intensity: 260 km/h (160 mph) (1-min); 905 hPa (mbar)

Super Typhoon Bess, having peaked at 160 mph (260 km/h) on July 5, tracked west-northwestward. The typhoon weakened as it continued its movement, and struck eastern Taiwan on the 22nd as a 130 mph (210 km/h) typhoon. It rapidly weakened over the country, and dissipated on the 10th over China. The typhoon caused heavy flooding, resulting in 32 deaths and moderate crop damage.

=== Severe Tropical Storm Carmen ===
- Severe tropical storm (JMA)
- Tropical storm (SSHWS)
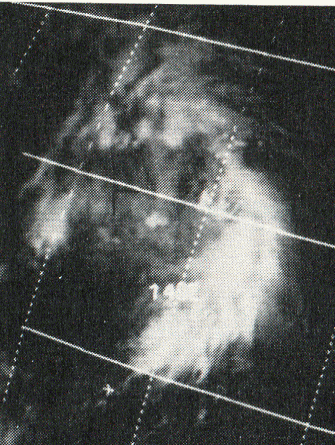
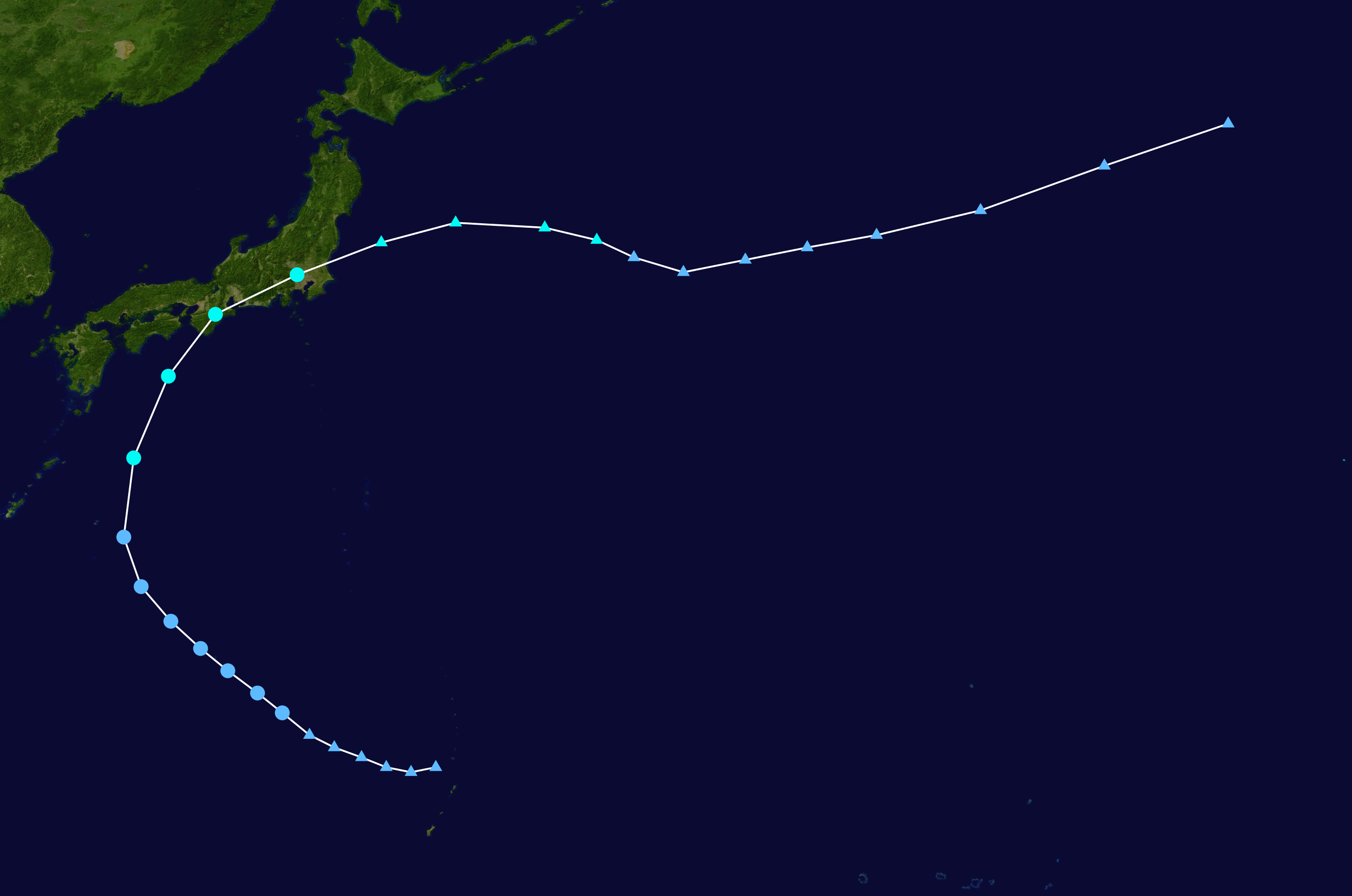
- Duration: September 22 – September 26
- Peak intensity: 95 km/h (60 mph) (1-min); 990 hPa (mbar)

=== Typhoon Della (Ading) ===
- Typhoon (JMA)
- Category 1-equivalent typhoon (SSHWS)
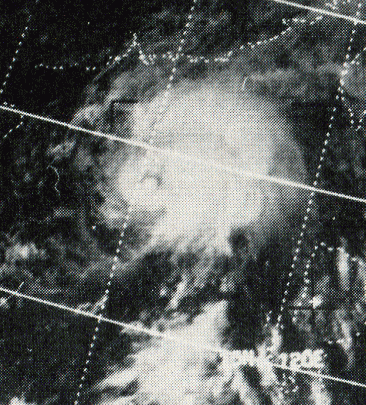
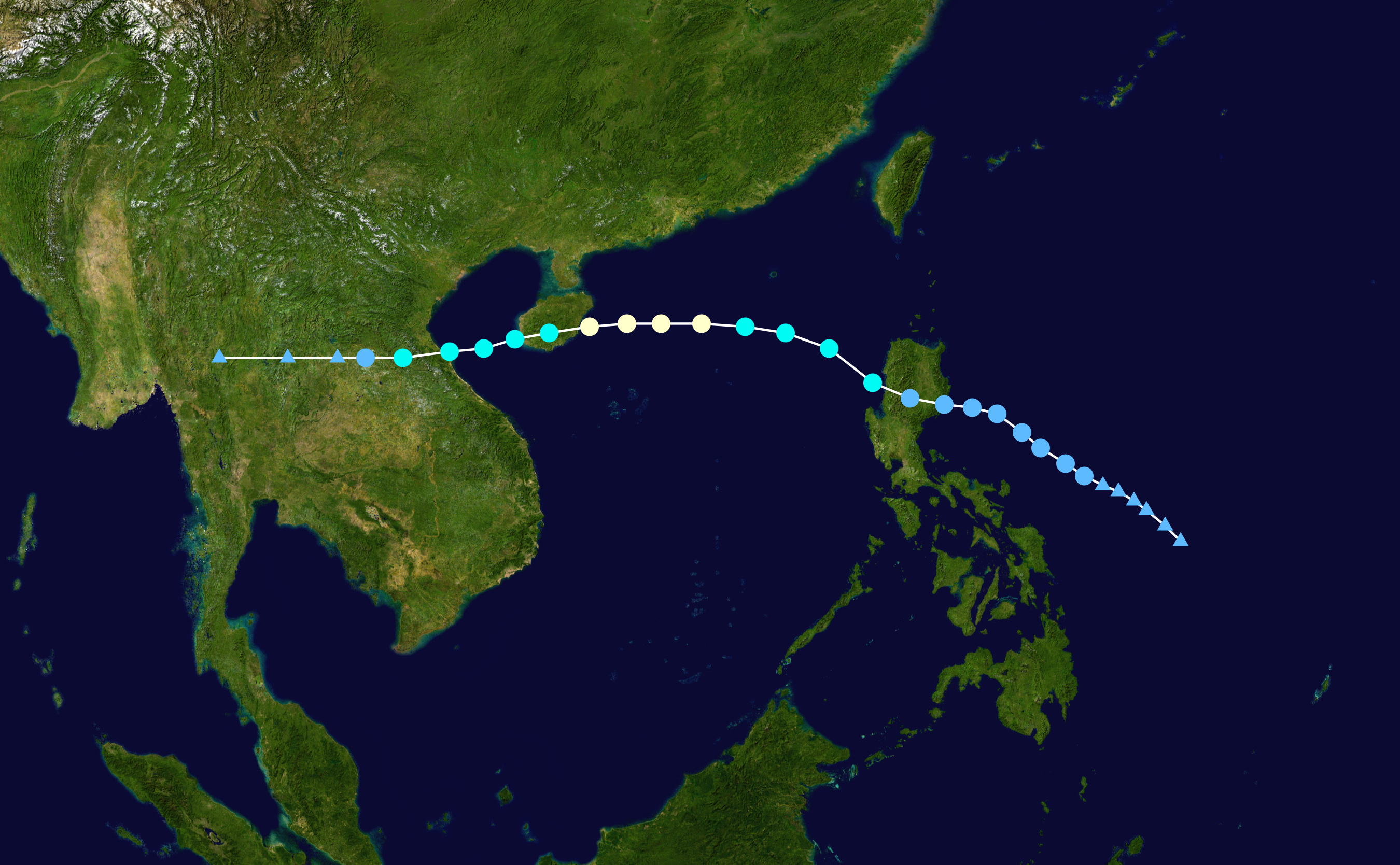
- Duration: September 24 – October 1
- Peak intensity: 130 km/h (80 mph) (1-min); 980 hPa (mbar)

=== Typhoon Elaine (Barang) ===
- Typhoon (JMA)
- Category 3-equivalent typhoon (SSHWS)
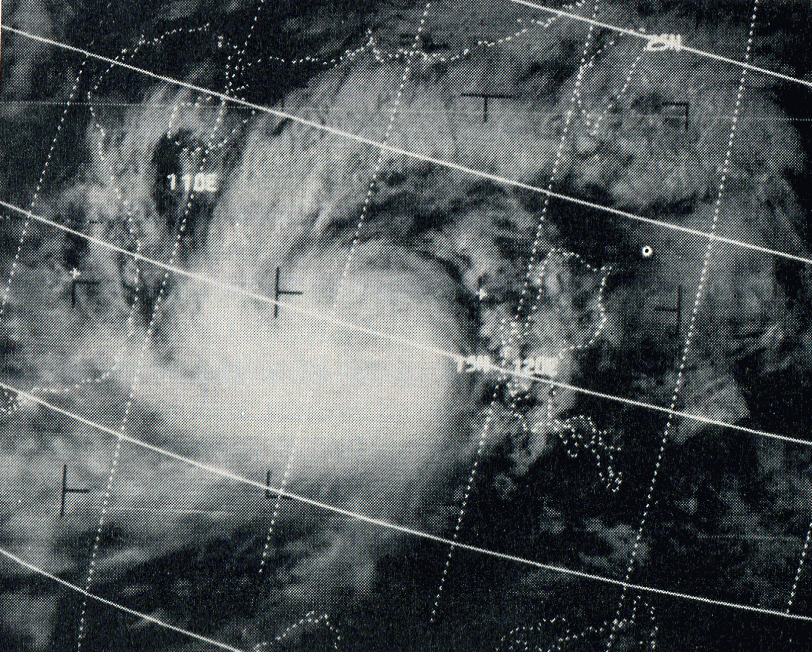
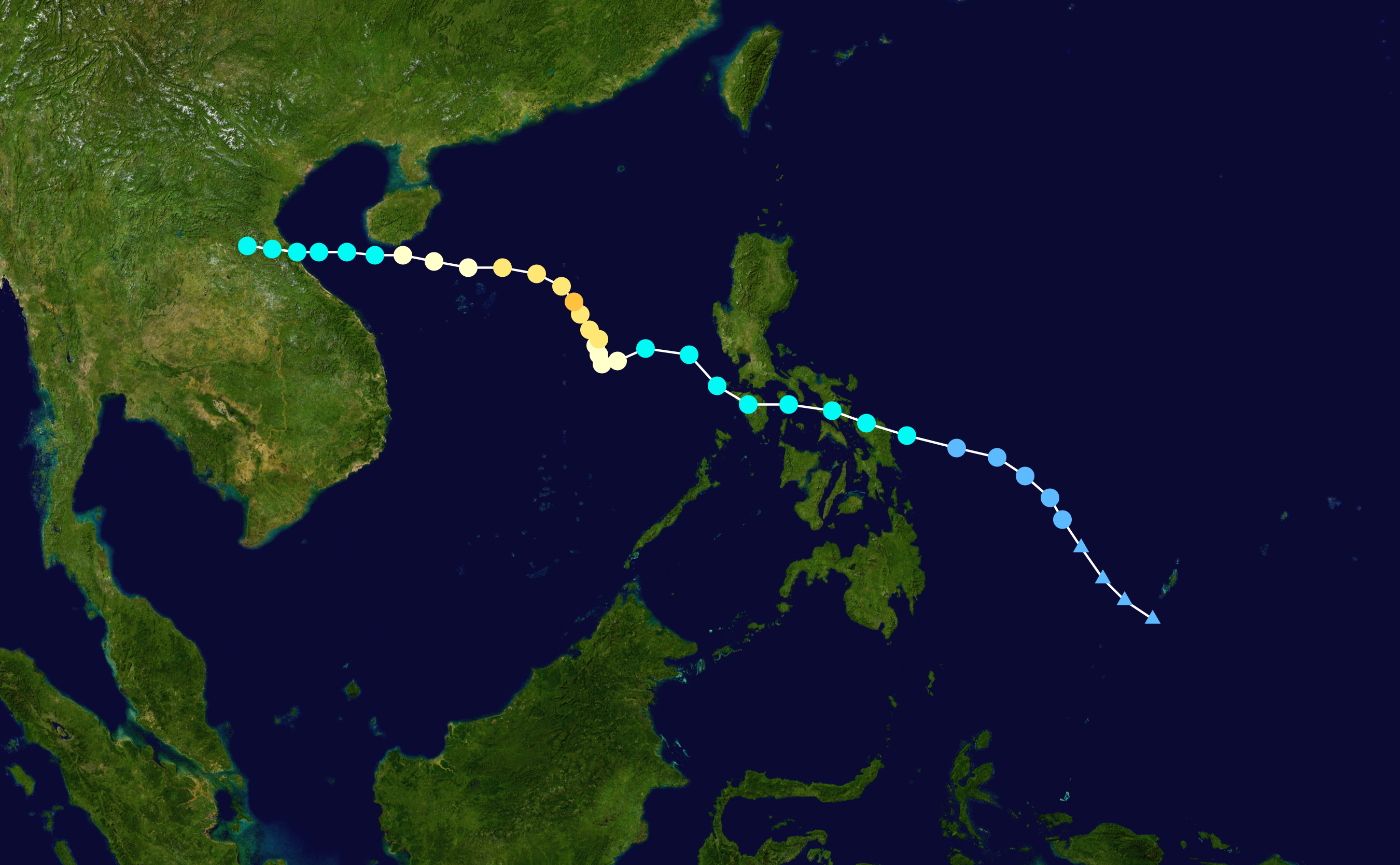
- Duration: October 1 – October 9
- Peak intensity: 185 km/h (115 mph) (1-min); 965 hPa (mbar)

=== Severe Tropical Storm Faye-Gloria (Krising-Dadang) ===
- Severe tropical storm (JMA)
- Category 1-equivalent typhoon (SSHWS)
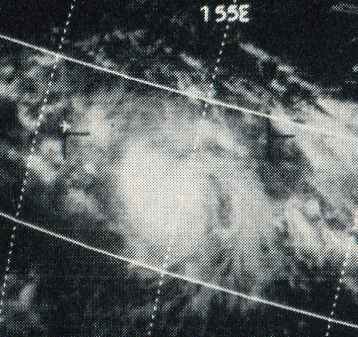
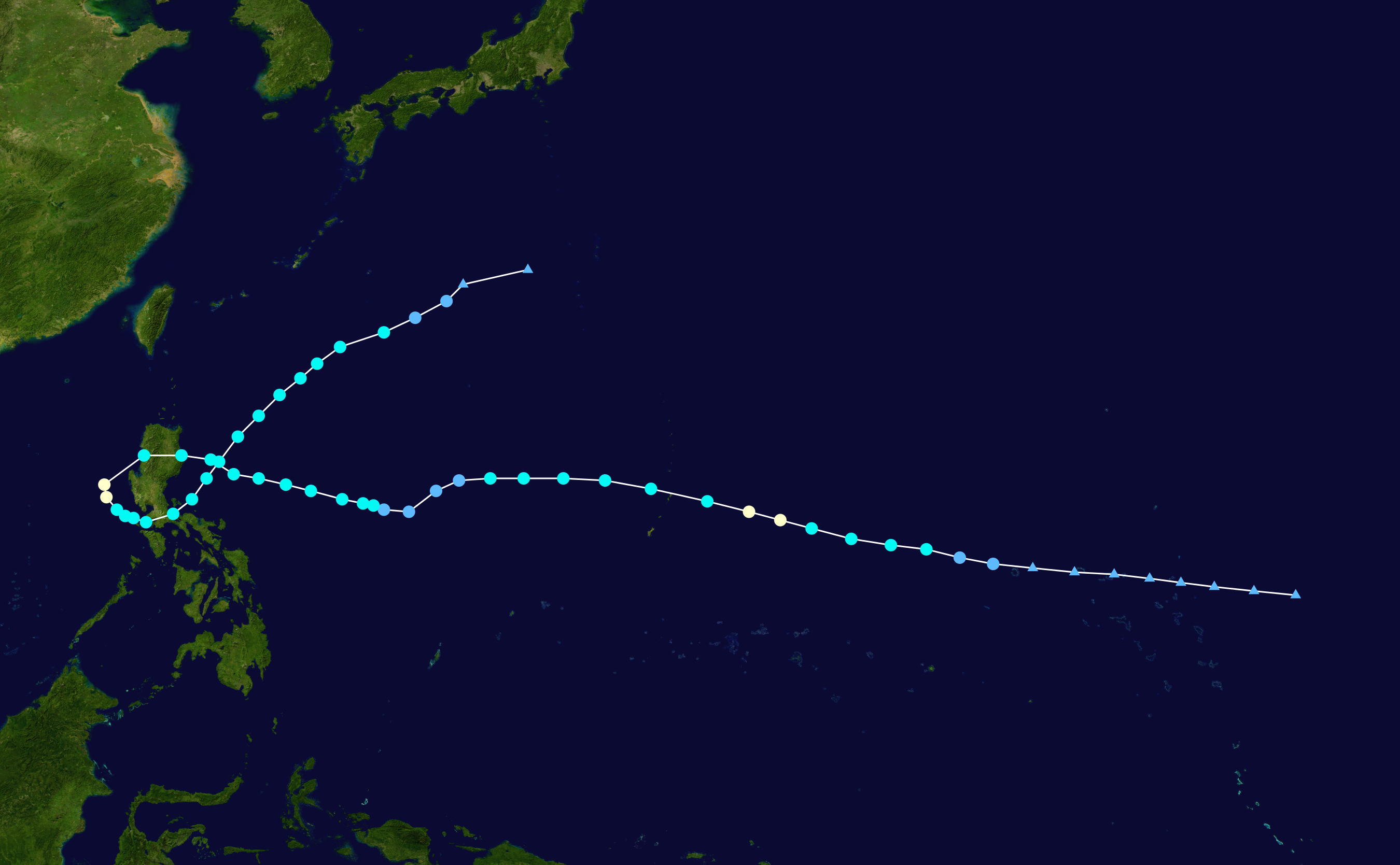
- Duration: October 4 – October 15
- Peak intensity: 120 km/h (75 mph) (1-min); 985 hPa (mbar)

A tropical disturbance east of the Marianas Islands developed into Tropical Storm Faye on October 4. After peaking at 75 mph (121 km/h) on the 5th, Faye became very disorganized, and weakened to a tropical depression on the 7th. At this time, there were several circulations, so it is possible that Faye was absorbed by another disturbance to its south. Regardless, the storm re-organized as it approached the Philippines. Faye crossed the islands on the 10th as a minimal tropical storm, and again became a typhoon in the South China Sea on the 11th. Steering currents became weak, and a northwest flow forced Faye southeastward back into the Philippines. Faye crossed the islands on the 12th, and dissipated on the 13th, after causing torrential rainfall killing 13 people with 80 missing.

=== Typhoon Hester (Goying) ===
- Typhoon (JMA)
- Category 2-equivalent typhoon (SSHWS)
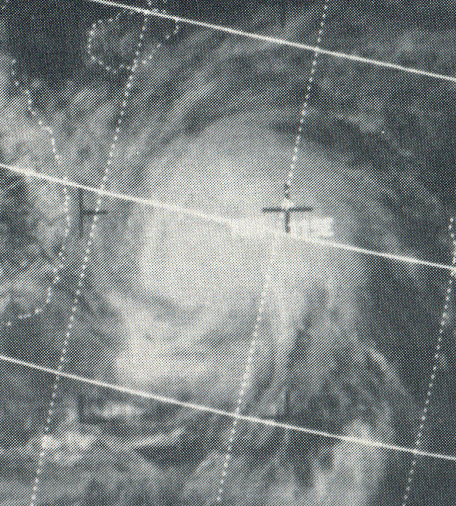
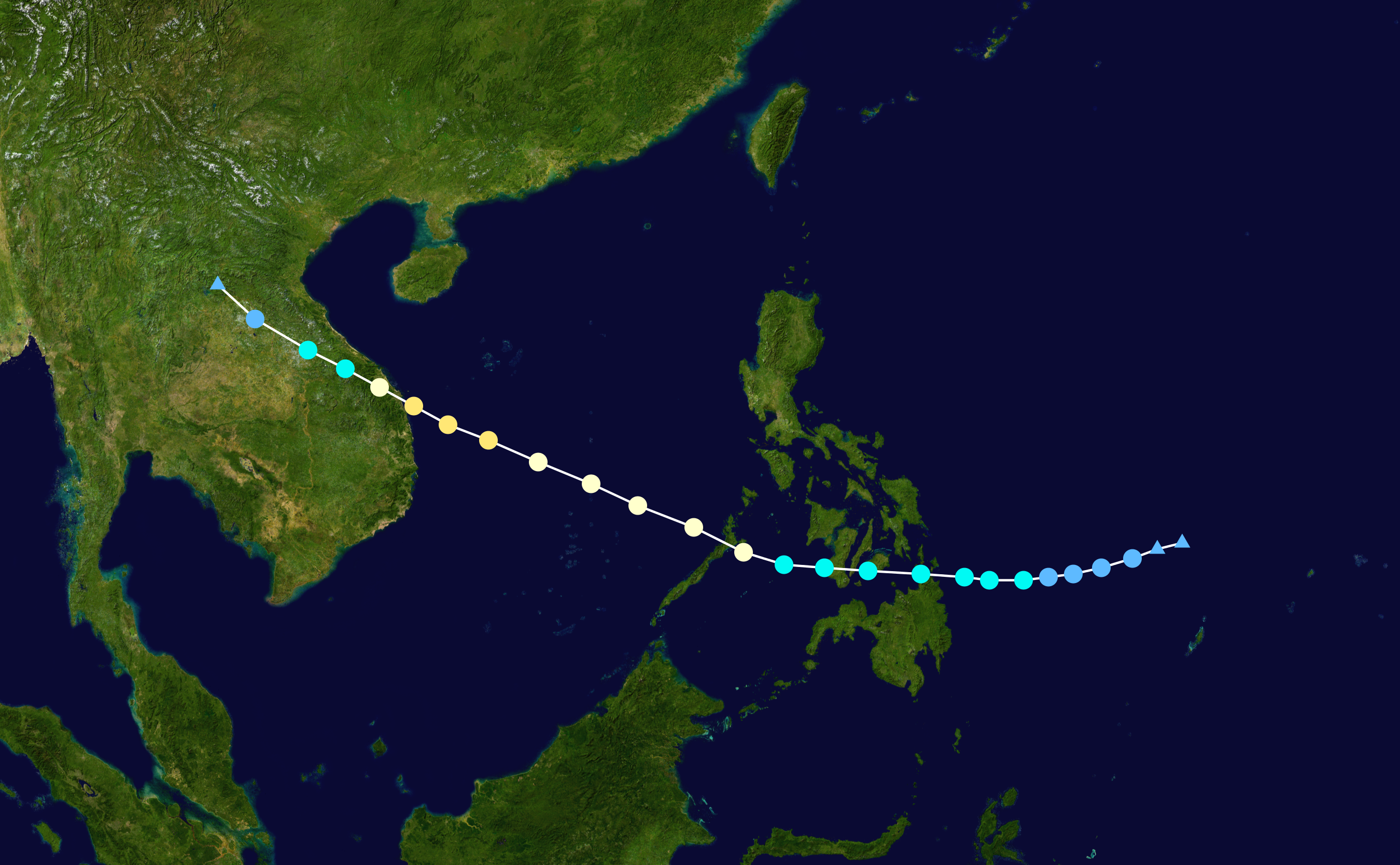
- Duration: October 18 – October 24
- Peak intensity: 165 km/h (105 mph) (1-min); 970 hPa (mbar)

Developing as a tropical depression on October 18 near Palau Island, Hester gradually intensified as it moved westward towards the Philippines. Across the Philippines, Hester was responsible for six deaths and ₱5 million in damage. After passing over Mindanao and the Visayas as a tropical storm between October 20 and 21, the storm intensified into a typhoon before striking Palawan. Once over the South China Sea, Hester further strengthened and ultimately attained peak winds of 165 km/h (105 mph). On October 23, the storm made landfall near Huế, South Vietnam. Once onshore, Hester rapidly weakened and dissipated on October 24 over Laos.

The most significant impact from Typhoon Hester was felt in South Vietnam were winds in excess of 155 km/h (100 mph) caused extensive damage to several United States Army bases. The hardest hit base was in Chu Lai where three Americans were killed. At least 75 percent of the structures in the base sustained damage and 123 aircraft were damaged or destroyed. Newspaper reports indicated that 100 Vietnamese lost their lives due to the storm, including 33 following a plane crash near Quy Nhơn. In the wake of the storm, the South Vietnamese government provided the hardest hit areas with relief funds and supplies.

=== Tropical Depression Hobing ===
- Tropical depression (PAGASA)
- Duration: November 4 – November 5
- Peak intensity: 55 km/h (35 mph) (10-min); 1001 hPa (mbar)

=== Typhoon Irma (Ining) ===
- Typhoon (JMA)
- Category 5-equivalent super typhoon (SSHWS)
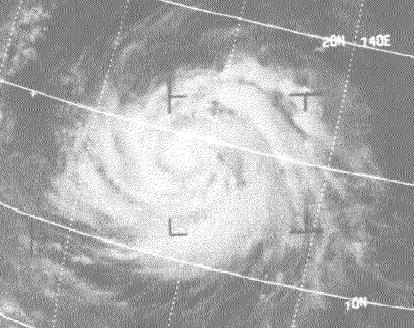
- Duration: November 7 – November 16
- Peak intensity: 285 km/h (180 mph) (1-min); 884 hPa (mbar)

The strongest typhoon of the season, Irma, reached a peak intensity of 180 mph (290 km/h) on November 11. It remained at sea, affecting only shipping and causing minor damage to the islands of the West Pacific. At the time, the typhoon held the record for the fastest intensification in a 24‑hour period, deepening from 980 mbar to 884 mbar but it was beaten by Typhoon Forrest of 1983.

=== Severe Tropical Storm Judy ===
- Severe tropical storm (JMA)
- Tropical storm (SSHWS)
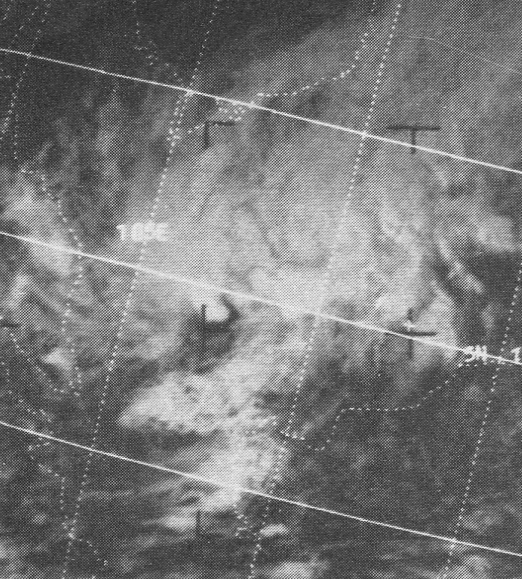
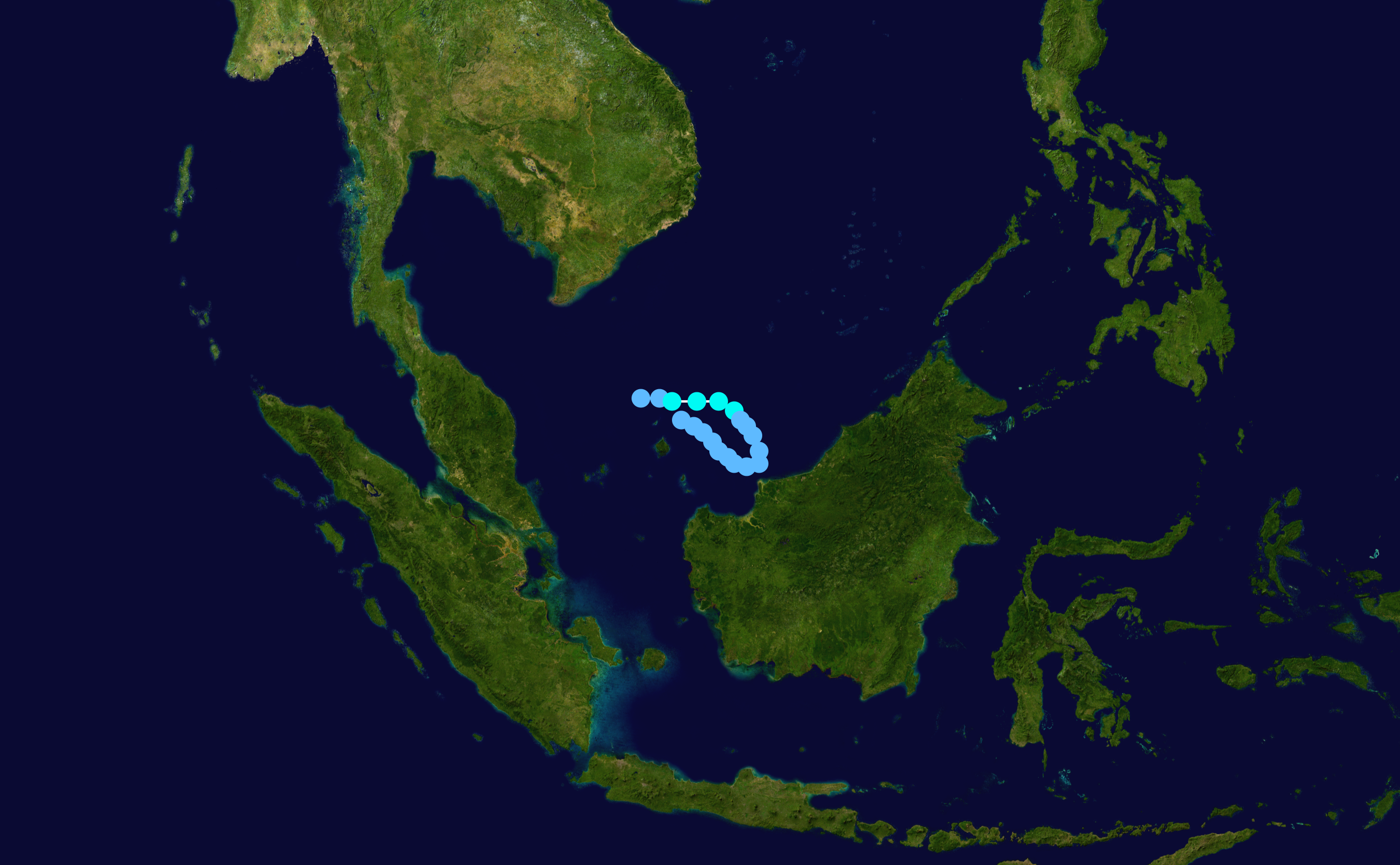
- Duration: November 15 – November 19
- Peak intensity: 85 km/h (50 mph) (1-min); 1000 hPa (mbar)

=== Other systems ===
Between January 7 and 8, the Philippine Weather Bureau (the predecessor of the modern-day PAGASA) monitored Tropical Depression Auring. In addition to the storms listed above, the China Meteorological Agency also monitored several other tropical cyclones, including one tropical storm and two severe tropical storms.

- April 3 – 7, 55 km/h (35 mph) 1008 mbar (hPa; 29.77 inHg)
- May 16 – 19, 55 km/h (35 mph) 1005 mbar (hPa; 29.68 inHg)
- June 13 – 17, 55 km/h (35 mph) 996 mbar (hPa; 29.42 inHg)
- July 20 – 21, 75 km/h (45 mph) 990 mbar (hPa; 29.24 inHg). The CMA reported this storm as a secondary system over the Taiwan Strait related to Super Typhoon Lucy.
- August 8 – 10, 45 km/h (30 mph) 995 mbar (hPa; 29.39 inHg)
- August 28 – September 1, 55 km/h (35 mph) 1002 mbar (hPa; 29.59 inHg)
- September 12 – 15, 45 km/h (30 mph) 1000 mbar (hPa; 29.53 inHg)
- September 13 – 17, 55 km/h (35 mph) 996 mbar (hPa; 29.42 inHg)
- September 25 – 30, 55 km/h (35 mph) 1001 mbar (hPa; 29.56 inHg)
- October 5 – 7, 95 km/h (60 mph) 1002 mbar (hPa; 29.59 inHg)
- October 10 – 17, 110 km/h (70 mph) 988 mbar (hPa; 29.18 inHg)
- November 4 – 8, 55 km/h (35 mph) 1002 mbar (hPa; 29.59 inHg)
- November 5 – 8, 45 km/h (30 mph) 1006 mbar (hPa; 29.71 inHg)
- November 20 – 24, 55 km/h (35 mph) 1006 mbar (hPa; 29.71 inHg)
- November 27 – 30, 55 km/h (35 mph) 1002 mbar (hPa; 29.59 inHg)
- December 27 – 30, 45 km/h (30 mph) 1005 mbar (hPa; 29.68 inHg)

Furthermore, there were two other systems listed within the International Best Tracks Database: one tropical depression and one tropical storm.

- June 11– 12, 45 km/h (30 mph)
- September 12– 14, 65 km/h (40 mph)

== Storm names ==
=== International names ===
During the season, 35 named tropical cyclones developed in the Western Pacific and were named by the Joint Typhoon Warning Center. The names were drawn sequentially from a set of four alphabetical naming lists and were all feminine. Faye-Gloria was recognized as only one storm.

Sarah	Thelma	Vera	Wanda	Amy	Babe	Carla	Dinah	Emma	Freda	Gilda	Harriet
Ivy	Jean	Kim	Lucy	Mary	Nadine	Olive	Polly	Rose	Shirley	Trix	Virginia
Wendy	Agnes	Bess	Carmen	Della	Elaine	Faye	Gloria	Hester	Irma	Judy	

=== Philippines ===
Auring	Bebeng	Karing	Diding	Etang
Gening	Herming	Ising	Luding	Mameng
Neneng	Oniang	Pepang	Rosing	Sisang
Trining	Uring	Warling	Yayang	
Auxiliary list
Ading	Barang	Krising	Dadang	Erling
Goying	Hobing	Ining		

The Philippine Weather Bureau uses its own naming scheme for tropical cyclones in their area of responsibility. It assigns names to tropical depressions that form within their area of responsibility and any tropical cyclone that might move into their area of responsibility. Should the list of names for a given year prove to be insufficient, names are taken from an auxiliary list, the first 6 of which are published each year before the season starts. Names not retired from this list will be used again in the 1975 season. This is the same list used for the 1967 season, except for Warling, which replaced Welming. The agency uses its own naming scheme that starts in the Filipino alphabet, with names of Filipino female names ending with "ng" (A, B, K, D, etc.). Names that were not assigned/going to use are marked in gray.

== Season effects ==
This is a table of all of the storms that have formed in the 1971 Pacific typhoon season. It includes their duration, names, affected areas, damages, and death totals. Deaths in parentheses are additional and indirect (an example of an indirect death would be a traffic accident), but were still related to that storm. Damage and deaths include totals while the storm was extratropical, a wave, or a low, and all of the damage figures are in 1971 USD. Names listed in parentheses were assigned by PAGASA.

Name	Dates active	Peak classification	Pressure	Land areas affected	Damage (USD)	Deaths	Refs
Auring	January 7 – 8	Tropical depression	Not specified	None	None	None	
Sarah	January 8 – 11	Severe tropical storm	990 hPa (29.23 inHg)	None	None	None	
TD	February 9 – 11	Tropical depression	1006 hPa (29.71 inHg)	Philippines	None	None	
Thelma (Bebeng)	March 16 – 21	Tropical storm	994 hPa (29.35 inHg)	None	None	None	
TD	April 4 – 5	Tropical depression	1006 hPa (29.71 inHg)	None	None	None	
Vera (Karing)	April 6 – 19	Typhoon	965 hPa (28.50 inHg)	None	None	None	
Wanda (Diding)	April 22 – May 5	Typhoon	980 hPa (28.94 inHg)	Philippines, South Vietnam, Southern China	>$700,000	79	
TD	April 25 – 28	Tropical depression	1004 hPa (29.65 inHg)	None	None	None	
TD	April 28 – May 1	Tropical depression	997 hPa (29.44 inHg)	None	None	None	
TD	April 30	Tropical depression	1006 hPa (29.71 inHg)	None	None	None	
Amy	April 27 – May 7	Typhoon	890 hPa (26.28 inHg)	Micronesia, Mariana Islands	$6.4 million	1	
Babe (Etang)	May 2 – 7	Severe tropical storm	990 hPa (29.23 inHg)	Philippines	None	None	
TD	May 14 – 16	Tropical depression	1006 hPa (29.71 inHg)	None	None	None	
TD	May 16 – 19	Tropical depression	1004 hPa (29.65 inHg)	None	None	None	
Carla (Gening)	May 17 – 23	Severe tropical storm	995 hPa (29.38 inHg)	Philippines	None	None	
Dinah (Herming)	May 23 – 31	Typhoon	960 hPa (28.35 inHg)	Philippines, Southern China	Unknown	13	
Emma (Ising)	May 27 – June 3	Tropical storm	1000 hPa (29.53 inHg)	Philippines	None	None	
Freda (Luding)	June 9 – 19	Typhoon	980 hPa (28.94 inHg)	Philippines, Taiwan, Southeastern China	Unknown	7	
TD	June 12 – 17	Tropical depression	1000 hPa (29.53 inHg)	None	None	None	
TD	June 14 – 14	Tropical depression	1008 hPa (29.77 inHg)	None	None	None	
Gilda (Mameng)	June 22 – 28	Typhoon	975 hPa (28.79 inHg)	Philippines, Southern China	Unknown	1	
Harriet (Neneng)	June 30 – July 8	Typhoon	925 hPa (27.32 inHg)	Philippines, North Vietnam, South Vietnam	Unknown	5	
Ivy	July 4 – 8	Severe tropical storm	990 hPa (29.23 inHg)	Japan	Unknown	1	
Kim (Oniang)	July 8 – 14	Severe tropical storm	980 hPa (28.94 inHg)	Philippines, Southern China, North Vietnam	Unknown	None	
Jean (Pepang)	July 8 – 19	Typhoon	975 hPa (28.79 inHg)	Philippines, Southern China, North Vietnam, Laos	Unknown	None	
Lucy (Rosing)	July 13 – 24	Typhoon	910 hPa (26.87 inHg)	Philippines, Taiwan, China,	Unknown	2	
Mary	July 16 – 21	Typhoon	975 hPa (28.79 inHg)	None	None	None	
Nadine (Sisang)	July 19 – 27	Typhoon	900 hPa (26.58 inHg)	Mariana Islands, Philippines, Taiwan, China	Unknown	32	
Olive	July 24 – August 7	Typhoon	935 hPa (27.61 inHg)	Japan	Unknown	69	
Polly (Trining)	August 3 – 11	Severe tropical storm	980 hPa (28.94 inHg)	China	Unknown	None	
TD	August 7	Tropical depression	1008 hPa (29.77 inHg)	None	None	None	
TD	August 8 – 11	Tropical depression	1000 hPa (29.53 inHg)	None	None	None	
Rose (Uring)	August 6 – 17	Typhoon	960 hPa (28.35 inHg)	Philippines, China	Unknown	130	
Shirley	August 10 – 17	Typhoon	955 hPa (28.20 inHg)	None	None	None	
Trix	August 19 –September 1	Typhoon	955 hPa (27.02 inHg)	Japan	$50.6 million	45	
25W	August 23 – 29	Tropical storm	992 hPa (29.29 inHg)	None	None	None	
TD	August 27 – 31	Tropical depression	1002 hPa (29.59 inHg)	None	None	None	
TD	August 30	Tropical depression	1010 hPa (29.83 inHg)	None	None	None	
Virginia	September 1 – 8	Typhoon	955 hPa (28.20 inHg)	Japan	Unknown	56	
TD	September 4	Tropical depression	1008 hPa (29.77 inHg)	None	None	None	
Wendy	September 4 – 13	Typhoon	915 hPa (27.02 inHg)	Wake Island	Unknown	None	
TD	September 6 – 8	Tropical depression	1006 hPa (29.71 inHg)	None	None	None	
TD	September 9 – 11	Tropical depression	1000 hPa (29.53 inHg)	None	None	None	
TD	September 12 – 15	Tropical depression	1000 hPa (29.53 inHg)	None	None	None	
28W	September 13 – 15	Tropical depression	996 hPa (29.41 inHg)	None	None	None	
TD	September 14	Tropical depression	1004 hPa (29.65 inHg)	None	None	None	
Agnes (Warling)	September 10 – 19	Typhoon	975 hPa (28.79 inHg)	Taiwan, China	Unknown	1	
Bess (Yayang)	September 16 – 23	Typhoon	905 hPa (26.72 inHg)	Ryukyu Islands, Taiwan, China	Unknown	32	
Carmen	September 22 – 26	Severe tropical storm	990 hPa (29.23 inHg)	Japan	Unknown	20	
TD	September 24 – 29	Tropical depression	1002 hPa (29.59 inHg)	None	None	None	
Della (Ading)	September 24 –October 1	Typhoon	980 hPa (28.94 inHg)	Philippines, Southern China, North Vietnam, Laos	Unknown	None	
Elaine (Barang)	October 1 – 9	Typhoon	965 hPa (28.50 inHg)	Philippines, Southern China, North Vietnam	Unknown	29	
Faye (Krising)	October 4 – 15	Severe tropical storm	985 hPa (29.09 inHg)	Philippines	Unknown	13	
TD	October 6 – 7	Tropical depression	1003 hPa (29.62 inHg)	None	None	None	
TD	October 7 – 8	Tropical depression	1000 hPa (29.53 inHg)	None	None	None	
Thirty-three	October 11 – 14	Tropical storm	992 hPa (29.29 inHg)	None	None	None	
TD	October 11	Tropical depression	998 hPa (29.47 inHg)	None	None	None	
TD	October 16 – 17	Tropical depression	1010 hPa (29.83 inHg)	None	None	None	
Hester (Goying)	October 18 – 24	Typhoon	970 hPa (28.64 inHg)	Philippines, North Vietnam, South Vietnam, Laos	>$3.6 million	119	
TD	October 26 – 27	Tropical depression	1012 hPa (29.88 inHg)	Philippines	None	None	
TD	October 31 –November 2	Tropical depression	1004 hPa (29.65 inHg)	None	None	None	
TD	November 2 – 7	Tropical depression	1004 hPa (29.65 inHg)	None	None	None	
TD	November 4 – 8	Tropical depression	1002 hPa (29.59 inHg)	None	None	None	
TD	November 4 – 5	Tropical depression	1006 hPa (29.71 inHg)	None	None	None	
TD	November 5 – 8	Tropical depression	1006 hPa (29.71 inHg)	None	None	None	
Irma (Ining)	November 7 – 16	Typhoon	885 hPa (26.13 inHg)	Micronesia, Ryukyu Islands	Unknown	None	
Judy	October 15 – 19	Severe tropical storm	1000 hPa (29.53 inHg)	None	None	None	
TD	November 18 – 20	Tropical depression	1008 hPa (29.77 inHg)	None	None	None	
TD	November 19 –December 2	Tropical depression	1004 hPa (29.77 inHg)	None	None	None	
TD	December 28 – 29	Tropical depression	1006 hPa (29.71 inHg)	Philippines	None	None	
Season Aggregates
70 systems	January 8 –December 29, 1971		885 hPa (26.13 inHg)		$61.3 million	642	

== See also ==
- List of Pacific typhoon seasons
- List of wettest tropical cyclones
- 1971 Pacific hurricane season
- 1971 Atlantic hurricane season
- 1971 North Indian Ocean cyclone season
- Australian cyclone seasons: 1970–71, 1971–72
- South Pacific cyclone seasons: 1970–71, 1971–72
- South-West Indian Ocean cyclone seasons: 1970–71, 1971–72
