= List of named storms (M) =

Storms are named for historical reasons to avoid confusion when communicating with the public, as more than one storm can exist at a time. Names are drawn in order from predetermined lists. For tropical cyclones, names are assigned when a system has one-, three-, or ten-minute winds of more than 65 km/h (40 mph). Standards, however, vary from basin to basin. For example, some tropical depressions are named in the Western Pacific, while within the Australian and Southern Pacific regions, the naming of tropical cyclones are delayed until they have gale-force winds occurring more than halfway around the storm center.

This list covers the letter M.

== Storms ==
Note: † indicates the name was retired after that usage in the respective basin

- Ma-on

- 2004 – became a super typhoon and made landfall on the Izu Peninsula, Honshū, Japan, killing 6 people.
- 2011 – a large and powerful typhoon that affected southern Japan in July 2011.
- 2016 – did not make landfall.
- 2022† – affected northern Luzon, Philippines, South China and northern Vietnam.

- Maarutha (2017) – a weak and first tropical cyclone to make landfall in Myanmar in April.
- Mabel

- 1948 – a strong typhoon that remained out to sea.
- 1981 – a Category 5 severe tropical cyclone that minimal impact Western Australia.

- Mac

- 1979 – crossed southern Luzon and then made landfall near Hong Kong.
- 1982 – a category 5 typhoon heavy rains and high winds in the southern part of the island led to US$1.5 million in damage.
- 1986 – a tropical storm and turned northeast, paralleling the coast of Taiwan.
- 1989 – a strong typhoon made landfall Japan.

- Madeline

- 1949 – did not make landfall.
- 1961 – downgraded in post-analysis, should not have been named.
- 1968 – never threatened land.
- 1976 – Made landfall near Zihuatanejo, causing heavy damage.
- 1980 – short-lived storm, stayed out to sea.
- 1986 – not a threat to land.
- 1992 – stayed out to sea.
- 1998 – threatened Islas Marías and parts of Mexico before dissipating caused no damage.
- 2016 – Category 4 major hurricane that approached Hawaii but veered southward and missed the islands.
- 2022 – caused some damage as it moved along the coast of southwestern Mexico.

- Madi (2013) – a strong tropical cyclone minimal affected South India and Sri Lanka.
- Maemi (2003)† – the most powerful typhoon to strike South Korea since record-keeping began in the country in 1904.
- Magda (2010)† – a small tropical cyclone that brought minor damage to parts of Western Australia.
- Maggie

- 1946 – never threatened land.
- 1966 – a weak tropical storm that paralleled the Mexican coast where it eventually made landfall in the Manzanillo.
- 1970 – a tropical storm that approached Hawaii and brought heavy rains.
- 1971 – a category 3 tropical cyclone (Australian scale), stayed sea.
- 1974 – a Category 4 hurricane, never threatened land.
- 1999 – a large and powerful typhoon that affected the Philippines and southeast Asia.

- Maha (2019) – a powerful tropical cyclone was moving along the coast of India, causing rough surf and moderate coastal flooding.
- Mahasen (2013) – a relatively weak tropical cyclone that caused loss of life across six countries in Southern and Southeastern Asia.
- Maila (2026)† – a Category 5 severe tropical cyclone that affected in the Solomon Islands and Papua New Guinea.
- Mal (2023)† – a Category 3 severe tropical cyclone that affected Fiji.
- Mala (2006) – a powerful tropical cyclone made landfall in Myanmar's.
- Malakas

- 2005 – a weak tropical storm which drifted out to sea.
- 2010 – a strong Category 2 typhoon which stayed out to sea.
- 2016 – a powerful Category 4 typhoon which impacted Taiwan and Japan, killing 1 person.
- 2022† – an extremely large early-season Category 3 typhoon which remained out to sea.

- Malia (2015) – a tropical storm that remained out to sea.
- Maliksi

- 2012 – storm's center passed over Iwo To (Iwo Jima).
- 2018 – remained at sea, but brought rainfall to the Philippines and to Japan.
- 2024 – a weak tropical storm that made landfall South China.

- Malou

- 2004 – struck Japan.
- 2010 – struck Japan and brought heavy rain.
- 2016 – a storm that was not recognized by the JTWC.
- 2021 – a strong typhoon that remained out to sea.

- Mameng

- 1963 – a weak tropical depression
- 1967 – struck southern China.
- 1971 – traversed the Philippines and struck southern China.
- 1975 – affected Hong Kong and southern China.
- 1979 – struck the Korean Peninsula as a tropical storm.
- 1983 – dissipated near Vietnam.
- 1987 – affected Vietnam
- 1991 – a small typhoon that affected Taiwan and China.
- 1995 – crossed the Philippines and hit southern China.
- 1999 – a weak tropical storm that caused 133 deaths and $309.4 million (1999 USD) in damages.

- Mamie

- 1953 – a powerful category 3 typhoon that passed off the coast of Japan.
- 1957 – a powerful category 3 typhoon, stayed sea.
- 1960 – a powerful category 4 typhoon then passed to the southeast of Tokyo no damage was reported.
- 1963 – a powerful category 3 typhoon, stayed sea.
- 1968 – a category 1 typhoon that affected the Philippines and South Vietnam.
- 1972 – a weak tropical storm made landfall in Vietnam.
- 1975 – a brief tropical storm that passed near South Japan and broke up near South Korea.
- 1982 – a strong tropical storm made landfall in Nha Trang.
- 1985 – the worst tropical cyclone to affect northeastern China in 26 years.
- 1988 – a weak tropical storm, did not make landfall.

- Man-yi

- 2001 – a strong typhoon that remained out to sea.
- 2007 – a powerful tropical cyclone that battered Japan as a weakening typhoon and became the second super typhoon of the 2007, just after Yutu.
- 2013 – a very severe storm that brought very strong winds and flash floods to Japan during mid-September.
- 2018 – November typhoon that stayed out to sea.
- 2024† – a Category 5 super typhoon that made landfall in Aurora and Catanduanes.

- Mandous (2022) – a strong tropical cyclone struck the Andaman and Nicobar Islands, as well as South India.
- Mangga (2020)† – a weak Category 1 tropical cyclone that hit Western Australia with damaging winds and heavy rain.
- Mangkhut

- 2013 – a weak storm that landfall in Northern Vietnam.
- 2018† – a destructive Category 5 super typhoon that made landfall in Cagayan, Philippines, and subsequently impacted Hong Kong and southern China.

- Mani (2020) – a rare South Atlantic subtropical storm.
- Manuel

- 1983 – never made landfall.
- 1989 – paralleled the coast of Mexico; never made landfall.
- 2001 – formed from the remnants of Hurricane Iris.
- 2013† – costliest Pacific hurricane on record; made landfall twice in Mexico (Colima, Sinaloa); killed at least 169 people.

- Marce

- 2004 – a mid-season category two typhoon that brought severe damage to Taiwan and the People's Republic of China in August 2004.
- 2008 – a typhoon which affected the Philippines, Taiwan, China and Japan.
- 2012 – a powerful tropical storm made landfall over southern Tuy Hòa, Vietnam.
- 2016 – a powerful tropical storm hit Philippines.
- 2020 – a powerful tropical storm that passed along the coast of Japan.
- 2024 – a Category 4 typhoon that impacted the Philippines before later affecting Vietnam.

- Marcia

- 1974 – did not affect land.
- 1989 – did not affect land.
- 2000 – did not affect land.
- 2015† – one of the most intense tropical cyclones making landfall over Queensland, Australia.

- Marco

- 1990 – hugged west coast of Florida, making landfall as a tropical depression, causing heavy rain and moderate damage.
- 1996 – formed in the Caribbean Sea and, while never making landfall, was large enough to drop heavy rain on Central America and Hispaniola, causing flooding and mudslides that killed eight
- 2008 – smallest tropical cyclone (radius of winds from center) on record that rapidly formed in the Bay of Campeche.
- 2020 – a minimal Category 1 hurricane that formed in the central Caribbean and subsequently weakened to a tropical depression before degenerating into a remnant low in the northern Gulf of Mexico.

- Marcus (2018)† – A severe tropical cyclone that struck Australia's Northern Territory and the Kimberley region of Western Australia in 2018. It was the most destructive storm to hit Darwin since Cyclone Tracy in 1974.
- Marge

- 1945 – a weak tropical stormmaking landfall on Philippines.
- 1951 – an unusually intense and large typhoon that formed in August 1951 during the 1951.
- 1955 – a category 3 typhoon, hit Japan.
- 1962 – never made landfall.
- 1964 – a powerful tropical cyclone that impacted Palau and the Philippines in November 1964.
- 1967 – a powerful category 4 typhoon hit Philippines.
- 1970 – strong tropical storm made landfall Philippines.
- 1973 – a typhoon that formed in September 1973.
- 1976 – a strong tropical storm did not make landfall.
- 1980 – stayed at sea.
- 1983 – a powerful category 5 typhoon, stayed at sea.
- 1986 – a category 2 typhoon, hit Philippines.

- Margot

- 1985† – a category 3 tropical cyclone impact Western Australia.
- 2023 – a Category 1 hurricane that stayed in the open ocean.

- Maria

- 2000 – a severe tropical storm that made a landfall in southern China.
- 2005 – a Category 3 hurricane that did not affect any land area as a tropical cyclone.
- 2006 – tracked just south and east of Japan.
- 2011 – a Category 1 hurricane that formed in the eastern Atlantic, made landfall on Newfoundland, causing minor damage.
- 2012 – did not affect land.
- 2017† – an extremely powerful hurricane that made landfall in the island of Dominica at Category 5 intensity, and later brushed through St. Croix, U.S. Virgin Islands before making landfall in Puerto Rico as a high-end Category 4 hurricane where devastation and a humanitarian crisis occurred.
- 2018 – a Category 5 super typhoon which weakened before making landfall in East China.
- 2024 – a severe tropical storm that made landfall at Tōhoku region in Japan.

- Marian

- 1990 – a strong typhoon that impact in the Philippines and Taiwan.
- 1991 – a Category 4 severe tropical cyclone that minimal impact East Timor and Northern Territory.
- 1993 – a weak tropical depression stayed within the Philippine Sea.
- 2021 – a Category 3 severe tropical cyclone that mostly remained at sea.

- Marie

- 1954 – a relatively weak typhoon which nonetheless devastated Japan and killed 1,361 people.
- 1958 – a strong typhoon that had no effects on land.
- 1961 – made landfall in Shikoku as a tropical depression.
- 1964 – an erratic system which meandered in the Ryukyu Islands.
- 1965 – tropical cyclone passed off the coast of the Northern Territory.
- 1966 – another strong typhoon that stayed at sea.
- 1969 – the final storm of the 1969 season; did not affect land areas.
- 1972 – destroyed many crops and coconut palms in the Northern Marianas Islands
- 1976 – a strong early-season typhoon which did not affect land.
- 1984 – a Category 1 hurricane that stayed offshore Baja California in early September.
- 1990 – a Category 4 hurricane that had no effects on land; briefly threatened the Hawaiian islands.
- 1997 – a typhoon which formed in the Northern Mariana Islands but ultimately did not impact any major landmass.
- 2008 – a Category 1 hurricane that had no effects on land.
- 2014 – a rare Category 5 hurricane that produced some flooding in coastal Mexico while producing large swells that caused damage and multiple deaths along Baja California and Southern California.
- 2020 – a Category 4 hurricane that had no effects on land.
- 2026 – a Category 2 hurricane that caused rough seas off the coast of California.

- Marilyn

- 1995† – Category 3 hurricane that caused significant damage in the Leeward Islands.
- 2015 – a strong typhoon, but stayed out in sea.
- 2019 – a weak system that drifted over the open sea before dissipating.

- Maring

- 1964 – a tropical depression that was only recognized by JTWC and PAGASA.
- 1968 – made landfall on Miyakojima and Kyūshū in Japan.
- 1972 – traversed the southern Ryukyu Islands, passed just north of Taiwan and struck China.
- 1976 – struck Japan.
- 1980 – weak tropical depression which affected the Philippines and China.
- 1984 – struck the northern part of Luzon claiming 121 lives, before making landfall in China.
- 1988 – made landfall on the extreme northern tip of Luzon Island and then Hong Kong.
- 1992 – brushed Luzon, then hit southern Taiwan, eastern China, and South Korea, causing 61 deaths.
- 1996 – a strong typhoon which brushed the northern portion of the Philippines and eventually made landfall in southern China, causing at least 140 fatalities.
- 2000 – struck Vietnam.
- 2001 – hit Taiwan and the Ryukyu Islands.
- 2005 – triggered mudslides killing 95 in eastern China.
- 2009 – hit Hainan and northern Vietnam.
- 2013 – caused flooding in the Philippines.
- 2017 – impacted the Philippines and Vietnam.
- 2021† – a deadly and damaging storm which affected the Philippines, China and Hong Kong.

- Mario

- 2014† – brushed the Northern Philippines, where it caused over $231 million in damages; later landfall on Shanghai, China.
- 2019 – never threatened land.
- 2025 – tropical storm that formed just off the coast of Mexico and moved into the open ocean.

- Marion (1977)† – Category 2 tropical cyclone that made landfall Vanuatu.
- Mark

- 1983† – a Category 3 cyclone on the (Australian Scale) taking an erratic and unusual track affected Fiji and Vanuatu.
- 1992 (January)† – a weak tropical cyclone High waves brought $3.5 million (AUD) damage to the Weipa port.
- 1992 (August) – a weak tropical storm one person was killed and another reported missing losses reached $10.4 million.
- 1995 – raced off the northeast away from land.

- Martha

- 1948 – a Category 3 typhoon that stayed at sea
- 1966 – formed in the Australian region and stayed at sea.
- 1969 – a rare Category 1 hurricane that made landfall in Panama.

- Martin

- 1986 – weak tropical cyclone had only minor effects on land.
- 1997† – damaging and deadly Category 3 tropical cyclone that affected the Cook Islands and French Polynesia.
- 2022 – large but short-lived category 1 hurricane that churned in the open North Atlantic.

- Marty

- 1985 – no effect on land.
- 1991 – briefly threatened the Mexican coastline.
- 1996 – a minimal storm that killed 125 in Vietnam.
- 1997 – not a threat to land.
- 2003 – made two landfalls on the Baja California peninsula.
- 2009 – never affected land.
- 2015 – affected southwestern Mexico.
- 2021 – had no effect on land; formed from the remnants of Atlantic basin Hurricane Grace.

- Mary

- 1952 – a Category 1 typhoon affected Philippines, Taiwan, East China, and South Korea.
- 1956 – a short-lived typhoon that never impacted land.
- 1960 – caused a significant amount of damage in Hong Kong and China.
- 1962 – did not affect land in its entire lifetime.
- 1965 – became a super typhoon as it approached China.
- 1968 – a powerful typhoon made landfall Japan.
- 1971 – no effect on land.
- 1974 – a strong typhoon affected China and Japan with moderate damage occurring.
- 1977 – moved through the Marshall Islands.

- Matmo

- 2008 – no effect on land.
- 2014 – the first tropical cyclone to impact Taiwan in 2014.
- 2019 – a strong tropical storm made landfall in Vietnam.
- 2025† – a Category 2 typhoon that made landfall in the Philippines and South China.

- Matthew

- 2004 - Brought heavy rain to the Gulf Coast of Louisiana, causing light damage but no deaths.
- 2010 - Made landfall in Central America and later moved into Mexico, causing 171 million in damages and 126 deaths.
- 2016† - an intense Category 5 hurricane that caused $16.4 billion in damages and at least 603 deaths throughout the Caribbean and the United States.

- Maud

- 1962 – a Category 1 tropical cyclone Existed south of Diego Garcia and executed a loop at the end of its track.
- 1973 – a Category 1 tropical cyclone existed offshore Western Australia.

- Maury

- 1981 – a moderate tropical storm that affected Taiwan and South China.
- 1984 – did not make landfall.
- 1987 – a weak tropical storm struck the Philippines and Vietnam.

- Mavis

- 1965 – a tropical cyclone that minimal affected Western Australia.
- 1971 – a Category 3 severe tropical cyclone that made landfall Western Australia causing flooding.

- Mawar

- 2005 – a strong super typhoon that battered southern Japan and caused great damage across the country.
- 2012 – a strong typhoon did not make landfall.
- 2017 – a strong tropical storm affected China.
- 2023 – a very powerful super typhoon that passed Guam; strongest storm in May and in the annual season.

- Max

- 1981 (March) – Category 3 tropical cyclone, crossed the Top End of Australia's Northern Territory, then moved west out to sea.
- 1981 (October) – did not make landfall.
- 1987 – Category 4 hurricane, churned in the open ocean.
- 1993 – did not make landfall.
- 2005 – Category 1 hurricane, no threat to land.
- 2017 – Category 1 hurricane, made landfall in southwestern Mexico.
- 2023 – a strong tropical storm that made landfall in southwestern Mexico.

- Maymay

- 2018 – a strong Category 5 typhoon that made landfall in Japan, becoming its costliest typhoon in terms of uninsured losses.
- 2022 – a short-lived depression that stayed off the coast of the Philippines.
- 2026 — a weak tropical storm tbat made landfall in the Philippines.

- Maysak

- 2002– did not make landfall.
- 2008 – a strong tropical storm affected Philippines and Vietnam.
- 2015 – an unusually intense typhoon during the early part of 2015.
- 2020 - a powerful category 4 typhoon that passed through the Ryukyu Islands and caused heavy damage on Korean Peninsula.
- 2026 – a severe tropical storm that made landfall on the Hainan and Vietnam.

- Meari

- 2004 – a typhoon that hit Japan in September 2004. Meari killed 27 people and caused nearly $800 million in damages
- 2011 – an unusually large tropical cyclone that caused significant damage from the Philippines to the Korean Peninsula in June 2011.
- 2016 – churned in the open ocean.
- 2022 – the brushed the southern coast of Japan without causing major impacts.

- Meena

- 1989 – a Category 2 tropical cyclone that made landfall Queensland as tropical depression.
- 2005†– a Category 5 severe tropical cyclone first of four cyclones to impact the Cook Islands during February 2005.

- Megan (2024)† – a Category 4 severe tropical cyclone that affected Northern Territory and Queensland.
- Megh (2015) – is regarded as the worst tropical cyclone to ever strike the Yemeni island of Socotra, causing additional destruction there after Cyclone Chapala hit the same island.
- Megi

- 2004 – moved through the Ryūkyū islands before passing between South Korea and Japan.
- 2010 – an intense typhoon that struck Luzon, causing damages amounting to $709 million, Taiwan and Fujian, China.
- 2016 – a large and powerful tropical cyclone which affected Taiwan and eastern China in late September 2016.
- 2022† – a deadly tropical cyclone that stalled in Leyte Gulf, bringing widespread flooding to the Philippines.

- Mekkhala

- 2002 – a weak tropical storm affected China.
- 2008 – affected southern China.
- 2015 – the first tropical storm of the 2015 season.
- 2020 – impacted southern China as a severe tropical storm.
- 2026 – a Category 4 typhoon that recurved to Japan after affecting the Philippines and Taiwan.

- Mekunu (2018) – the strongest storm to strike Oman's Dhofar Governorate since 1959.
- Melanie

- 1996 – a Category 4 tropical cyclone that crossed into the Indian Ocean, where it was renamed Bellamine.
- 2007 – a Category 2 tropical cyclone that did not affect land.

- Meli (1979)† – a Category 3 severe tropical cyclone that struck Fiji.
- Melissa

- 1994 – remained over open waters.
- 2007 – short-lived storm west of Cape Verde, never threatened land.
- 2013 – short-lived storm in the central Atlantic, never threatened land.
- 2019 – short-lived storm that formed in the central Atlantic.
- 2025† – long-lived and extremely powerful Category 5 hurricane that made a catastrophic landfall in Jamaica near peak intensity, and again in Cuba at Category 3 strength; tied as strongest Atlantic hurricane by sustained winds.

- Melor

- 2003 – a Category 1 typhoon that affected the Philippines, Taiwan and Japan.
- 2009 – a category 5 typhoon that struck Japan.
- 2015† – a category 4 typhoon that struck the Philippines.

- Meranti

- 2004 – a typhoon which stayed at sea throughout its lifetime, and also the first of a record nine named storms to form during the 2004 season.
- 2010 – a short-lived tropical storm which was upgraded by JMA to a severe tropical storm in post-analysis; peaked as a Category 1-equivalent tropical cyclone before making landfall in Fujian, China.
- 2016† - a strong typhoon that struck Taiwan and China, causing at least $4.7 billion worth of damage.

- Merbok

- 2004 – brought heavy flooding during mid-November 2004.
- 2011 – remained out at sea.
- 2017 – made landfall in China.
- 2022 – a Category 1 typhoon which later affected Alaska as a strong extratropical storm.

- Michael

- 2000 – Category 2 hurricane that caused moderate damage in Canada.
- 2012 – Category 3 hurricane that did not affect land.
- 2018† – Category 5 hurricane that formed near Central America, causing heavy flooding as it lingered over the area as a tropical depression, then rapidly intensified over the Gulf of Mexico making landfall in Florida at peak intensity. Michael caused about 74 fatalities and caused an estimated $25.1 billion (2018 USD) in damages.

- Michaung (2023) – a strong tropical cyclone that formed over the Bay of Bengal off the south-eastern coast of India.
- Michelle

- 1970 – a tropical cyclone that originated in the Australian region as Cyclone Kathy.
- 2001† – a Category 4 hurricane that became the costliest tropical cyclone in Cuban history at the time.

- Mick

- 1993 – Weak tropical cyclone that passed through Fiji, Tonga and New Zealand.
- 2009† – Made landfall on Fiji and killed at least eight.

- Midhili (2023) – a weak cyclone that made landfall in Bangladesh.
- Miding

- 1966 – a tropical depression which was only recognized by PAGASA and the China Meteorological Administration (CMA).
- 1970 – a tropical depression that was only monitored by PAGASA and the Japan Meteorological Agency (JMA).
- 1974 – a minimal tropical storm which brushed Taiwan and hit mainland China.
- 1978 – a typhoon that crossed northern Luzon Taiwan and hit Guangdong.
- 1982 – a relatively long-lasting typhoon which struck Taiwan as a tropical storm.
- 1986 – another long-lived typhoon that had an extremely erratic track, severely affecting Taiwan, northern Philippines and southern China.
- 1990 – a long-tracked typhoon which eventually brushed northern Luzon and caused severe damage in Vietnam.
- 1994 – an intense Category 4-equivalent typhoon that paralleled the eastern seaboard of the Philippines before skirting through Japan and South Korea.
- 1998 – a weak tropical storm which devastated Vietnam, claiming 49 lives.

- Mike

- 1950 – did not make landfall.
- 1990† – the strongest typhoon to hit the Philippines since Typhoon Irma in 1981 and Typhoon Nina in 1987.
- 2014 – at stayed sea.

- Mildred (1947) – a Category 1 typhoon that made landfall Philippines and struck South China.
- Milenyo

- 2002 – crossed Luzon as a weak system, killing 35 and causing damage worth ₱171.6 million (US3.330 million).
- 2006† – struck Luzon as a powerful typhoon, killing at least 188 and causing US$153 million in damage.

- Milton (2024)† – extremely powerful atlantic hurricane which became the second-most intense tropical cyclone ever recorded over the Gulf of Mexico that made landfall in the Florida.
- Mina

- 2003 – affected Taiwan and China in 2003.
- 2007 – Struck the Philippines, killed 71, damages from the storm amounted to US$20 million.
- 2011† – hit the Philippines killing 26, and causing widespread damage worth US$26million; later made landfall on Taiwan and on Fujian, China.

- Mindulle

- 2004 – struck the Philippines, Taiwan and China.
- 2010 – a strong tropical storm made landfall in Vietnam.
- 2016 - affected much of Japan during August 2016.
- 2021 - reached category 5 super typhoon status and affected eastern Japan.

- Mindy

- 2003 – remained at sea, but caused minor damage in Puerto Rico.
- 2021 – made landfall in Florida, weakening to a tropical depression shortly after. Also triggered deadly flooding in Mexico, killing 23 people.

- Mirasol (2025)† – a weak tropical storm that made landfall in the Philippines and South China.
- Mireille (1991)† – the costliest typhoon on record, until it was surpassed by Typhoon Hagibis in 2019.
- Miriam

- 1978 – a Category 1 hurricane that threatened Hawaii but did not affect land.
- 1982 – a Category 1 hurricane that did not affect land.
- 1988 – continuation of Hurricane Joan which originally formed in the Atlantic Ocean and crossed into the Pacific.
- 1994 – a short-lived storm that did not affect land.
- 2000 – a short-lived storm that hit Baja California as a weak storm.
- 2006 – a short-lived tropical storm that did not affect land.
- 2012 – a Category 3 hurricane that did not affect land.
- 2018 – a Category 2 hurricane that did not affect land.

- Mirinae

- 2009 – made landfall on Luzon, Philippines, and later Southern Vietnam.
- 2016 – made landfall on Hainan, China, and later on Northern Vietnam.
- 2021 – remained out to sea.

- Missatha (1950) – a Category 1 typhoon that paralleled Japan.
- Mitag

- 2002 - A powerful Category 5 storm in March 2002, but did not affect land.
- 2007 – Struck the Philippines, killed 71, damages from the storm amounted to $19.79 million.
- 2014 – recognised as a subtropical storm by the Joint Typhoon Warning Center.
- 2019 – a moderately strong tropical cyclone that severely affected Taiwan, East China and South Korea in early October 2019.
- 2025† – a weak tropical storm that made landfall in the Philippines and South China.

- Mitch (1998)† – a catastrophic Category 5 hurricane during the 1998 Atlantic hurricane season that caused more than 11,000 fatalities in Central America.
- Mitchell

- 2012 – a Category 1 tropical cyclone that had minimal impact on land.
- 2026 – a Category 3 severe tropical cyclone that impact Northern Territory and Western Australia.

- Mocha (2023) – an extremely powerful category 5-equivalent tropical cyclone that made landfall in Myanmar as a high-end category 4-equivalent tropical cyclone.
- Moke

- 1984 – a weak tropical storm that did not affect land.
- 2026 – weak storm that stayed at sea.

- Molave

- 2009 – a category 1 typhoon made landfall in China killed at least four people.
- 2015 – did not make landfall.
- 2020† - a powerful typhoon that devastated the Southern Luzon area of the Philippines and Vietnam.

- Mona

- 1963 – a Category 1 hurricane that made landfall in western Mexico.
- 2000 – a severe tropical cyclone that caused moderate damage in Tonga.
- 2019 – a moderate tropical cyclone that had minimal impact on land.

- Monica

- 1967 – which spent its life at sea south of Mexico.
- 1971 – did not affect land.
- 1975 – stayed far from land
- 1984 – formed west of New Caledonia, dissipated in the Coral Sea.
- 2006† – a most intense tropical cyclone, in terms of maximum sustained winds, on record to impact Australia, tied with Cyclone Marcus in 2018.

- Montha (2025) – a severe tropical cyclone that made landfall in the India.
- Monty

- 1983 – remained out to sea.
- 1993 – remained out to sea.
- 2004†– a powerful Category 4 tropical cyclone that made landfall Western Australia.

- Mora (2017) – a moderate but deadly tropical cyclone that caused widespread devastation and severe flooding in Sri Lanka, Andaman and Nicobar Islands, Bangladesh, Myanmar and Northeast India in May 2017.
- Morakot

- 2003 – brought significant rainfall to Taiwan before alleviating drought conditions in mainland China in August 2003.
- 2009† – the deadliest typhoon to impact Taiwan in recorded history.

- Muifa

- 2004 – struck the Philippines and Vietnam.
- 2011 – approached Japan, China and Korea.
- 2017 – did not make landfall.
- 2022 – the most powerful typhoon to hit Shanghai since Typhoon Gloria in 1949.

- Mujigae

- 2009 – made landfall on Hainan Island and then on Vietnam.
- 2015† – a destructive Category 4 typhoon that formed just east of the Philippines and made landfall in Guangdong, China.

- Mukda (2006) – did not affect land.
- Mulan (2022) – a weak tropical storm affected South China and Vietnam.
- Mun

- 2019 – a weak tropical storm that nearly crossed the Gulf of Tonkin that made landfall in Northern Vietnam.
- 2025 – severe tropical storm that did not affect land.

- Murasu (2026) – a Category 2 tropical cyclone that affected South India.
- Murjan (2012) – a weak tropical cyclone made landfall Somalia.
- Myrtle (1971) – a Category 3 severe tropical cyclone that did not affect land.

== See also ==
- Tropical cyclone
- Tropical cyclone naming
- European windstorm names
- Atlantic hurricane season
- List of Pacific hurricane seasons
- South Atlantic tropical cyclone
