= Meranti =

Meranti may refer to:

- Shorea or meranti, a plant genus
- Meranti, Indonesia, a district in Asahan Regency, North Sumatra Province, Indonesia
- Meranti (state constituency), Malaysia
- List of storms named Meranti
