= List of storms named Milenyo =

List of storms with the same or similar names

The name Milenyo was used by the Philippine Atmospheric, Geophysical and Astronomical Services Administration (PAGASA) to name two tropical cyclones within the Philippine Area of Responsibility in the Northwestern Pacific Ocean. It is a local word for millennium in Filipino.

- Tropical Depression Milenyo (2002) (18W) – crossed Luzon as a weak system, killing 35 and causing damage worth ₱171.6 million (US3.330 million).
- Typhoon Xangsane (2006) (T0615, 18W, Milenyo) – struck Luzon as a powerful typhoon, killing at least 188 and causing US$153 million in damage; later similarly affected Vietnam and Thailand.

The name Milenyo was retired and was replaced with Mario for the 2010 Pacific typhoon season.
