= List of storms named Michelle =

The name Michelle has been used for one tropical cyclone in the Atlantic Ocean and one in the South-West Indian Ocean.

In the Atlantic:

- Hurricane Michelle (2001) – a Category 4 hurricane that became the costliest tropical cyclone in Cuban history at the time

Michelle was retired in the Atlantic after the 2001 season and replaced by Melissa for the 2007 season.

In the South-West Indian Ocean:

- Cyclone Michelle (1970) – a tropical cyclone that originated in the Australian region as Cyclone Kathy
