= List of storms named Manuel =

The name Manuel was used for four tropical cyclones in the Eastern Pacific Ocean.

- Hurricane Manuel (1983) – strong Category 3 hurricane that never made landfall
- Tropical Storm Manuel (1989) – paralleled the coast of Mexico
- Tropical Storm Manuel (2001) – formed from the remnants of Hurricane Iris
- Hurricane Manuel (2013) – Category 1 hurricane that made landfall twice in Mexico (Colima, Sinaloa); killed at least 169 people

After the 2013 storm, the name Manuel was retired and replaced with Mario for the 2019 season.
