= List of storms named Mary =

The name Mary has been used for nine tropical cyclones in the West Pacific Ocean:

- Typhoon Mary (1952) (T5211, 10W) – a Category 1-equivalent typhoon.
- Typhoon Mary (1956) (T5620, 20W) – did not affect land.
- Typhoon Mary (1960) (T6003, 10W) – a Category 1-equivalent typhoon that caused over 1,600 fatalities and was nicknamed "Bloody Mary" by the Joint Typhoon Warning Center.
- Tropical Depression Mary (1962) (T6229) – did not affect land.
- Typhoon Mary (1965) (T6518, 23W, Saling) – a Category 5-equivalent super typhoon that affected Taiwan and China.
- Typhoon Mary (1968) (T6804, 07W) – a Category 4-equivalent super typhoon.
- Typhoon Mary (1971) (T7118, 17W) – a Category 1-equivalent typhoon.
- Typhoon Mary (1974) (T7414, 15W) – a Category 1-equivalent typhoon that wrecked the RMS Caronia launched in 1947.
- Typhoon Mary (1977) (T7721, 21W, Yeyeng) – a Category 2-equivalent typhoon that affected the Marshall Islands and the Philippines.

== See also ==
Storms with similar names

- Storm Joseph (2026) – a European windstorm that was named Marilu by the Free University of Berlin.
- Cyclone May (1998) – a Category 1 Australian region tropical cyclone that made landfall near Mornington Island.
- Tropical Storm Mele (1994) – a Central Pacific tropical storm that did not affect land; named the Hawaiian equivalent of Mary.
