= List of storms named Ike =

The name Ike has been used for three tropical cyclones worldwide: one in the Atlantic Ocean and two in the Western Pacific Ocean.

In the Atlantic:

- Hurricane Ike (2008) – a Category 4 hurricane that made landfall in the Bahamas, Cuba, and Texas, causing $38 billion in damages (2008 USD) and over 200 deaths.

The name Ike was retired in the Atlantic after the 2008 season and replaced with Isaias for the 2014 season.

In the West Pacific:

- Severe Tropical Storm Ike (1981) (T8104, 04W, Bining) – affected Taiwan.
- Typhoon Ike (1984) (T8411, 13W, Nitang) – a Category 4-equivalent typhoon that affected the Philippines and China, killing approximately 1,500 people.

The name Ike was retired in the West Pacific after the 1984 season and replaced with Ian for subsequent seasons.

== See also ==
- Hurricane Ioke (2006) – a similar name that has been used in the Central Pacific Ocean
- List of storms named Mike – a similar name that has been used in three tropical cyclone basins
