= Tropical Storm Fung-wong (2014) =

Western Pacific tropical storm in 2014

Tropical Storm Fung-wong (Mario)
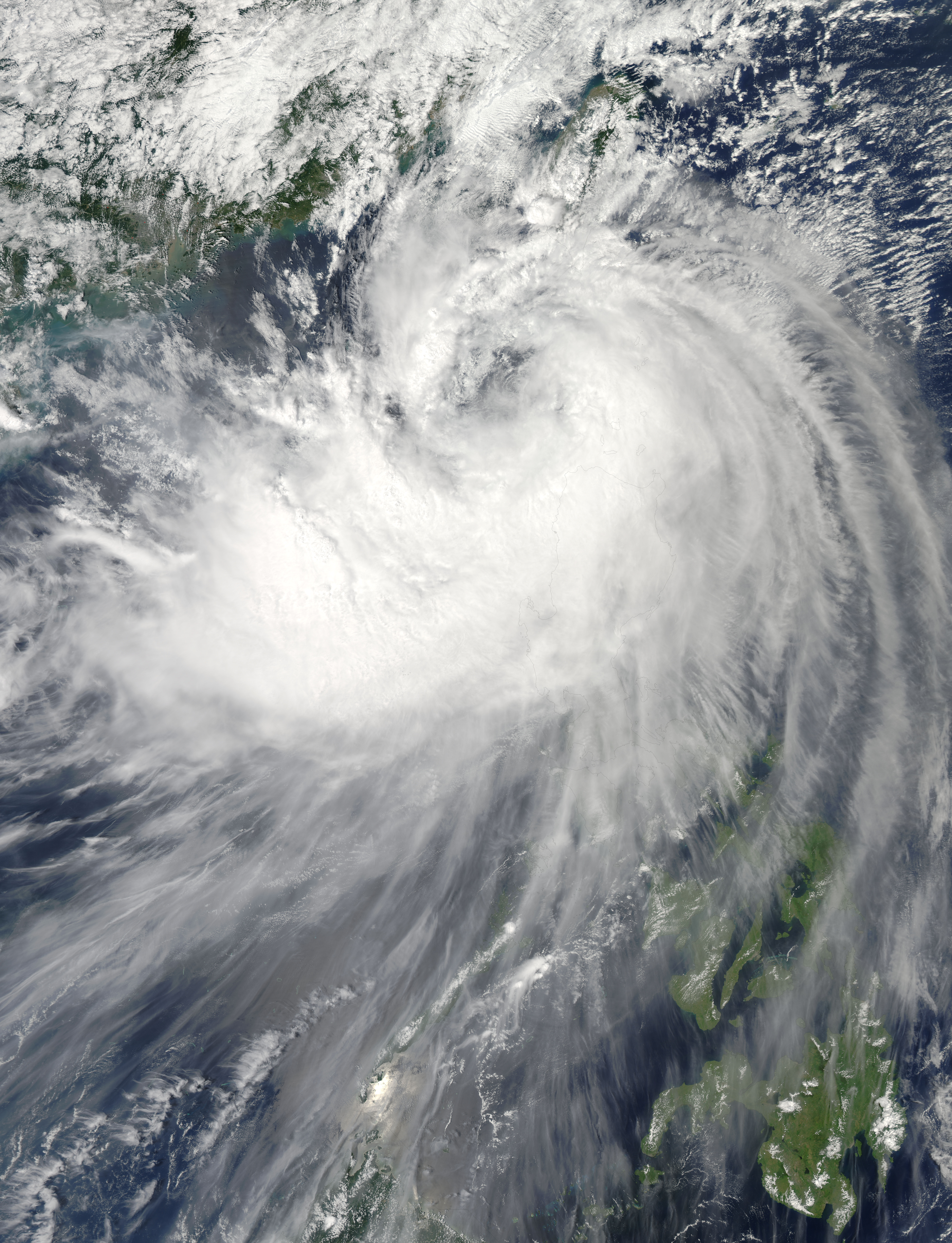
- Tropical Storm Fung-wong approaching Taiwan at peak intensity on September 20

Meteorological history
- Formed: September 17, 2014
- Extratropical: September 24, 2014
- Dissipated: September 25, 2014

Tropical storm
- 10-minute sustained (JMA)
- Highest winds: 85 km/h (50 mph)
- Lowest pressure: 985 hPa (mbar); 29.09 inHg

Tropical storm
- 1-minute sustained (SSHWS)
- Highest winds: 95 km/h (60 mph)
- Lowest pressure: 981 hPa (mbar); 28.97 inHg

Overall effects
- Fatalities: 22 total
- Damage: $231 million (2014 USD)
- Areas affected: Philippines, Taiwan, Japan, China, South Korea
- IBTrACS
- Part of the 2014 Pacific typhoon season

Tropical Storm Fung-wong, known in the Philippines as Tropical Storm Mario, was a relatively weak yet damaging tropical cyclone which affected the northern Philippines, Taiwan and the Eastern China in late September 2014. The sixteenth named storm of the 2014 typhoon season, Fung-wong caused severe flooding in Luzon, especially Metro Manila.

== Meteorological history ==
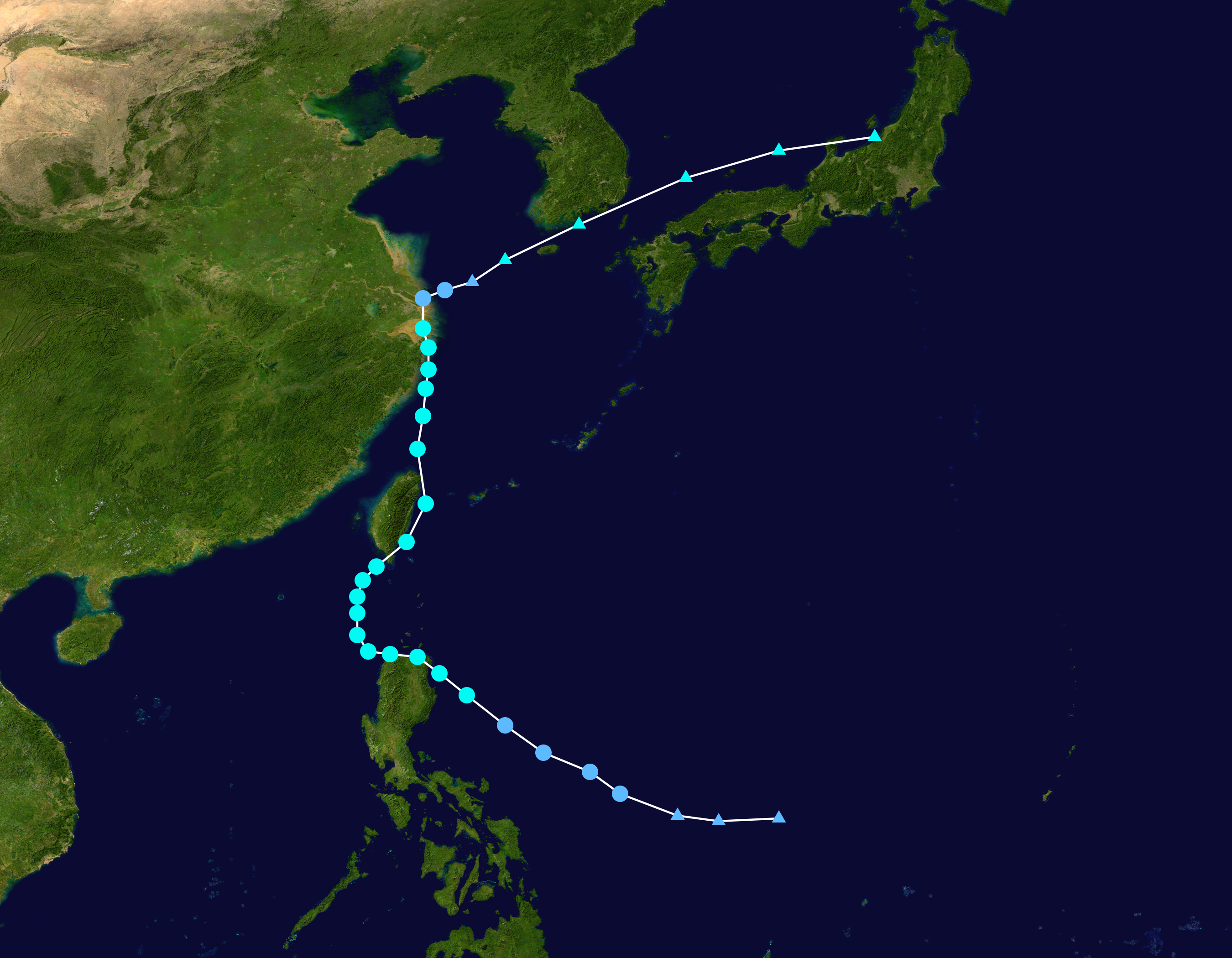
Map plotting the storm's track and intensity, according to the Saffir–Simpson scale Map key Saffir–Simpson scale Tropical depression (≤38 mph, ≤62 km/h) Tropical storm (39–73 mph, 63–118 km/h) Category 1 (74–95 mph, 119–153 km/h) Category 2 (96–110 mph, 154–177 km/h) Category 3 (111–129 mph, 178–208 km/h) Category 4 (130–156 mph, 209–251 km/h) Category 5 (≥157 mph, ≥252 km/h) Unknown Storm type Tropical cyclone Subtropical cyclone Extratropical cyclone, remnant low, tropical disturbance, or monsoon depression

Late on September 13, an area of convectional cloudiness persisted near the same position where Kalmaegi formed. The next day, JTWC upgraded it as a tropical disturbance. The system entered an area of moderate vertical windshear and towards warm waters, as it was upgraded to a tropical depression by the JMA early on September 17. On the same day, the depression moved into the Philippine Area of Responsibility and was locally named Mario. Later the same day, JTWC classified it as Tropical Depression 16W. As vertical windshear decreased around the storm system, it gathered more strength. With this, JMA classified it as a tropical storm, naming it Fung-wong on September 18. (Note: The name Fung-wong (Cantonese: 鳳凰, [fʊŋ˨ wɔːŋ˨˩]) was contributed by Hong Kong and means phoenix or refers to Lantau Peak in Cantonese.)

Fung-wong maintained its intensity while affecting Luzon. The storm made landfall in the night of the following day over the northern tip of Cagayan. Early on September 20, JMA upgraded it to a severe tropical storm strength, although it failed to intensify and reached its peak strength later that day. However, it was recorded colder cloud tops surrounding the center were still bringing heavy rainfall over the northern Philippines.

The storm made landfall on the shores of the southeastern part of Taiwan the next day. Fung-wong later weakened due to land interaction. Late on September 22, Fung-wong encountered some moderate vertical windshear and approached Eastern China. Both agencies downgraded Fung-wong to a tropical storm, just as it was making landfall over Shanghai on September 23.

On September 24, Fung-wong started to interact with a frontal system. Later on the same day, both the JMA and JTWC issued their final advisory on the system, stating that it had become extratropical.

== Preparations and impact ==
=== Philippines ===
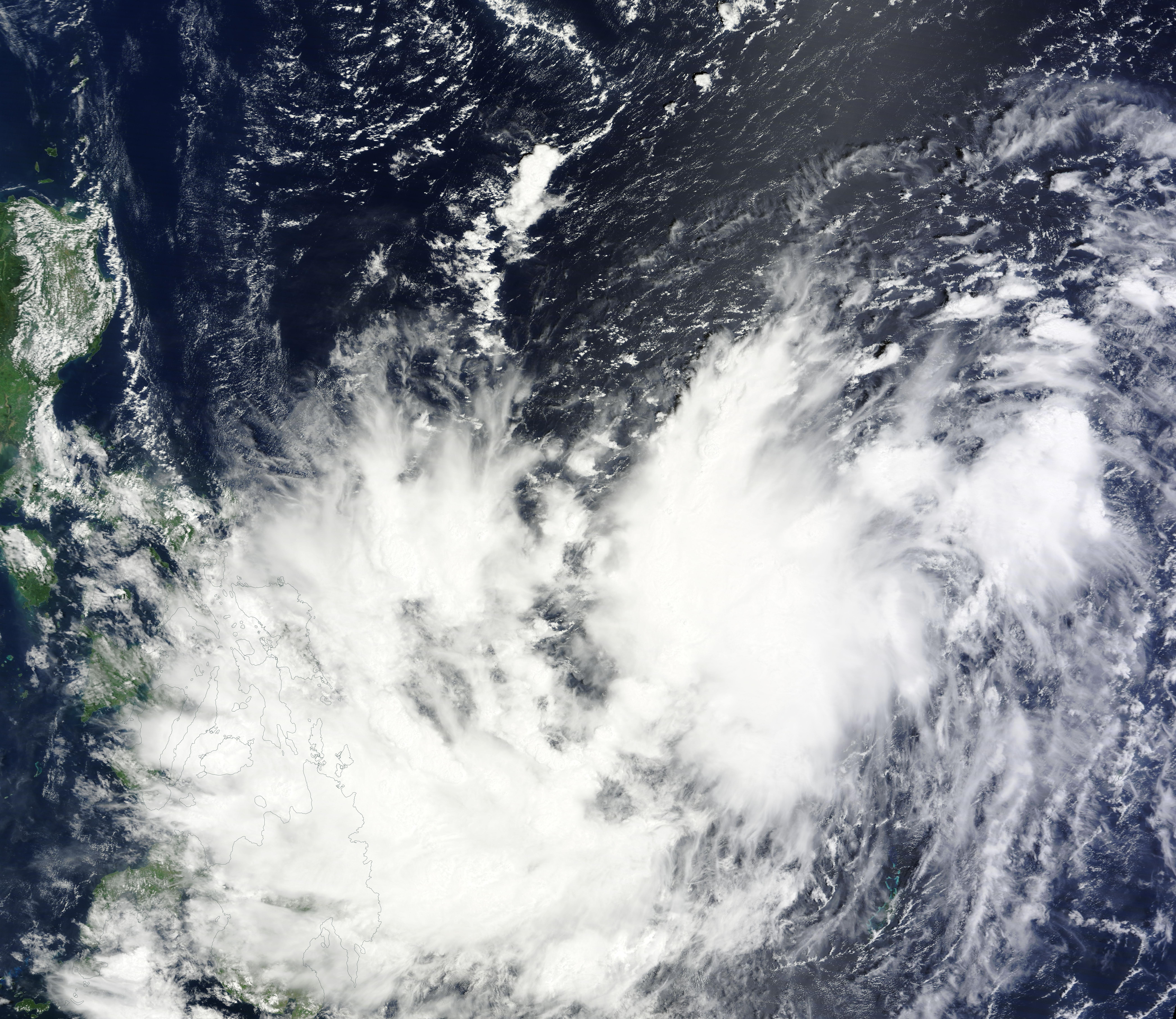
Tropical Depression 16W on September 17, to the east of the Philippines

Fung-wong enhanced the southwest monsoon which triggered severe flooding across the Visayas region. In Cebu, Governor Hilario P. Davide III cancelled classes in all levels on September 18 due to severe rainfall. Severe flooding also occurred in many places of Luzon. On September 19, the Malacañang Palace declared a wide suspension of classes in all levels in the cities of Metro Manila including the provinces of Region III and Region IV-A.

In the afternoon of that day, the palace then followed suit, declaring the suspension of government work and offices in Metro Manila, and some provinces in Bicol Region, Central Luzon and Southern Luzon. On the same day, PAGASA issued the red rainfall warning advisory in Metro Manila and the provinces of Bataan, Rizal, Zambales, Bulacan, Batangas, Cavite and Laguna which stated that torrential rainfall was expected in the next three hours. Yellow and Orange advisories were also issued in the provinces of Central Luzon, Region 4-B, Bicol Region and Region VI. The agency also reported that 268 mm of rain was recorded in the science garden in Quezon City between 2 a.m. and 8 a.m. on the same day.

About 21 domestic flights and six international flights were cancelled or diverted to Clark International Airport in Pampanga. The Civil Aviation Authority of the Philippines then released a statement regarding the radar malfunction in which it limits the communication between the pilot and the air control traffic tower in Ninoy Aquino International Airport.

Electricity was also shut down in some areas of Metro Manila and nearby provinces. About three percent of Meralco customers experienced power outages due to severe flooding. Several areas were flooded as high as ten feet. Some communications in the said areas also went down. Distress calls and messages flooded different networks and radio stations just to let their relatives know their situation.

In Marikina City, Mayor Del de Guzman placed the city under state of calamity as many of the barangays had been submerged in floodwaters. It was also reported that the water level of Marikina River reached 20 meters, prompting officials to evacuate people living near the river. Cainta Mayor Kit Nieto also placed the municipality of Cainta under state of calamity. In total, Fung-wong killed 18 people and caused ₱3.4 billion (US$76.4 million).

==== Mayon Volcano ====
Amid rain from Tropical Storm Fung-wong, lahar flowed in Albay from Mayon Volcano. Possible landslides were possible within the area due to 22 volcanic earthquakes and 77 rockfall events. NDRRMC warned residents to prepare and evacuate in the areas within the 6 km Radius Permanent Danger Zone.

=== Taiwan ===
Fung-wong made landfall over the southeastern part of Taiwan on September 21. Torrential rain and gale-force winds were reported. A total of 57 domestic and seven international flights were cancelled and ferry services to the offshore islands and mainland China were also suspended, according to the Central Emergency Operation Center. A total of 3 people were killed due to Fung-wong.

=== Mainland China ===
Fung-wong caused one fatality in mainland China, with total economic losses adding up to CNY 950 million (US$155 million).

== Retirement ==
The PAGASA announced that the name Mario was retired from PAGASA's list of names despite being first used in the PAGASA's typhoon naming list and replaced with the name Maymay after the season, after it had caused over ₱1 billion in damages. On the other hand, the name Fung-wong, was not retired despite the extensive damage it caused, and was used again in 2019 until its retirement in 2025 following this storm.

== See also ==
- Weather of 2014
- Tropical cyclones in 2014
- Typhoon Yunya (1991)
- Typhoon Ketsana (2009)
- Typhoon Haikui (2012)
- Tropical Storm Trami (2013)
- Typhoon Kalmaegi (2014)
- Tropical Storm Linfa (2015)
- Typhoon Vamco (2020)
- Typhoon Doksuri (2023)
- Typhoon Gaemi (2024)
