= Typhoon Xangsane =

Pacific typhoon in 2006

Typhoon Xangsane (Milenyo)
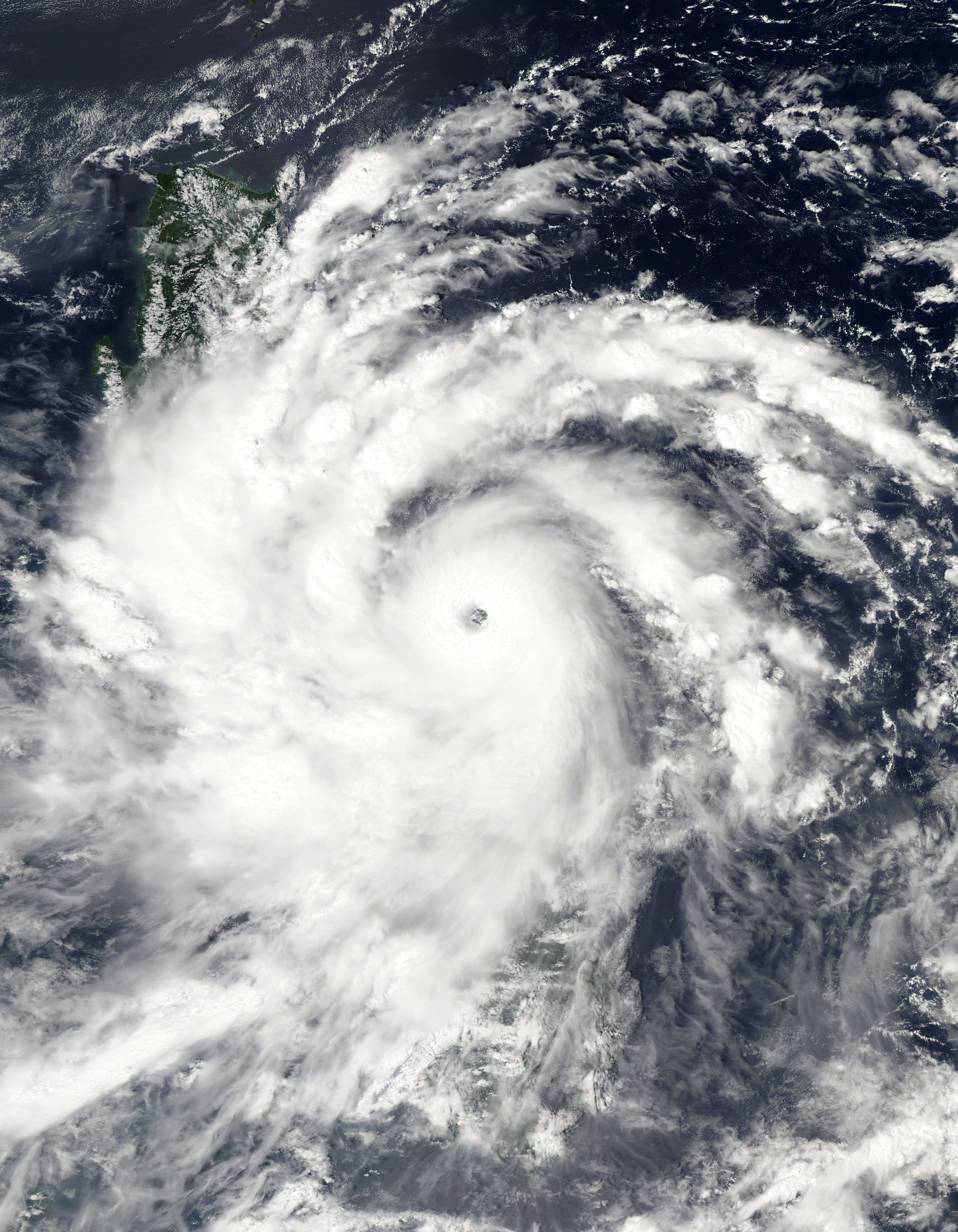
- Typhoon Xangsane at peak intensity near the Philippines on September 27

Meteorological history
- Formed: September 25, 2006
- Dissipated: October 2, 2006

Very strong typhoon
- 10-minute sustained (JMA)
- Highest winds: 155 km/h (100 mph)
- Lowest pressure: 940 hPa (mbar); 27.76 inHg

Category 4-equivalent typhoon
- 1-minute sustained (SSHWS/JTWC)
- Highest winds: 230 km/h (145 mph)
- Lowest pressure: 916 hPa (mbar); 27.05 inHg

Overall effects
- Fatalities: >312
- Damage: $750 million (2006 USD)
- Areas affected: Philippines, China, Vietnam, Thailand, Cambodia
- IBTrACS
- Part of the 2006 Pacific typhoon season

Typhoon Xangsane, (Note: The name Xangsane (Lao: ຊ້າງສານ, [saːŋ˥˨ saːn˨˦]) was contributed by Laos and means elephant in Lao.) known in the Philippines as Typhoon Milenyo, was a strong and deadly typhoon that affected the Philippines, and Indochina during the 2006 Pacific typhoon season.

Xangsane made landfall in the Philippines, battering the northern islands with torrential rains and strong winds, and causing widespread flooding and landslides. After passing over Manila and emerging over the South China Sea, the typhoon made a second landfall in central Vietnam, also causing flooding and landslides there and in Thailand. The storm was responsible for at least 312 deaths, mostly in the Philippines and Vietnam, and at least US$747 million in damage.

== Meteorological history ==
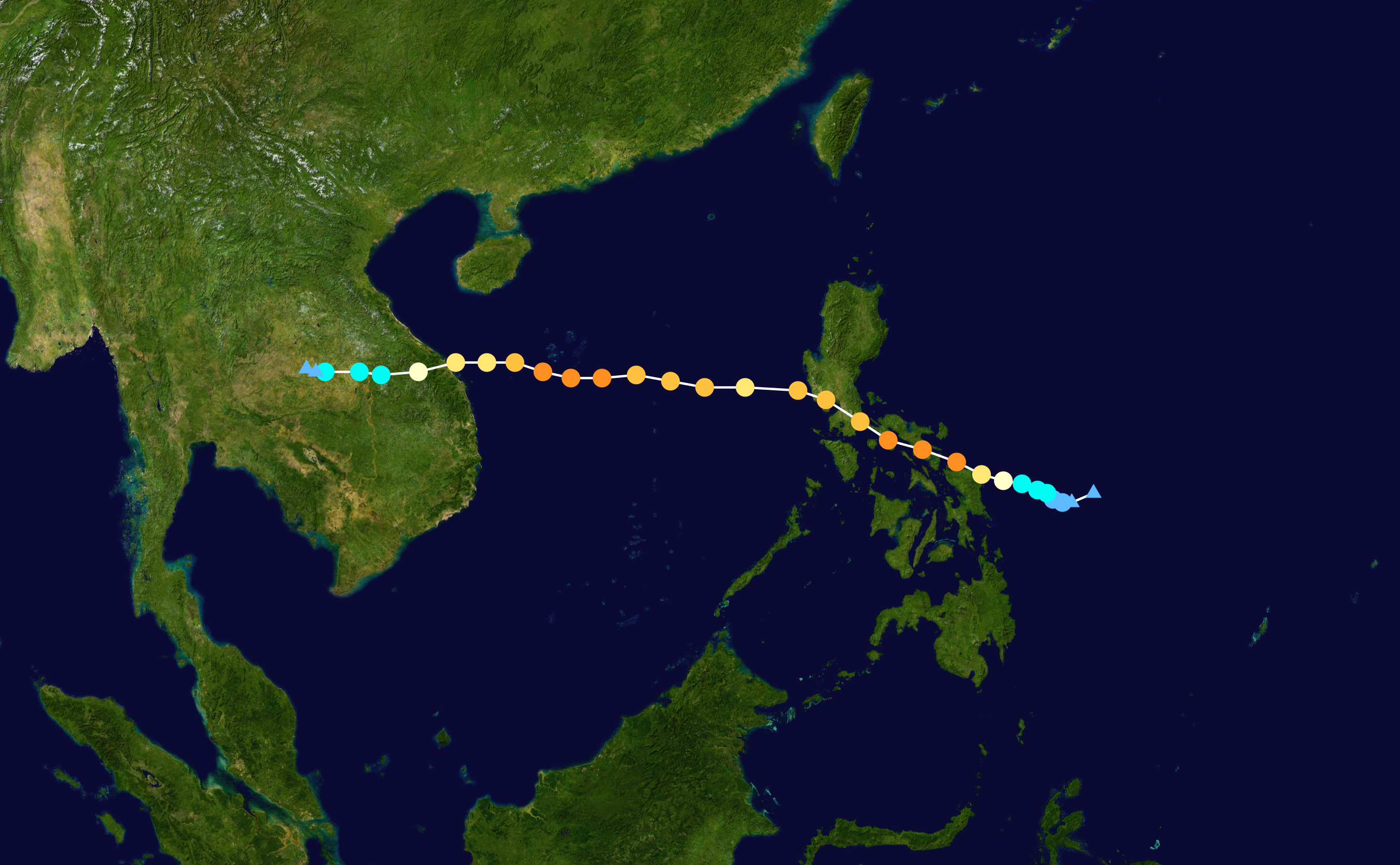
Map plotting the storm's track and intensity, according to the Saffir–Simpson scale Map key Saffir–Simpson scale Tropical depression (≤38 mph, ≤62 km/h) Tropical storm (39–73 mph, 63–118 km/h) Category 1 (74–95 mph, 119–153 km/h) Category 2 (96–110 mph, 154–177 km/h) Category 3 (111–129 mph, 178–208 km/h) Category 4 (130–156 mph, 209–251 km/h) Category 5 (≥157 mph, ≥252 km/h) Unknown Storm type Tropical cyclone Subtropical cyclone Extratropical cyclone, remnant low, tropical disturbance, or monsoon depression

The nucleus of Typhoon Xangsane originated from a disturbance embedded within the monsoon trough to the east of the Philippines. On September 23, a persistent area of convective thunderstorms was observed about 100 mi (160 km) northwest of Palau, in an environment favorable to tropical cyclogenesis. The Japan Meteorological Agency (JMA) declared the formation of a tropical depression at 00:00 UTC on September 25. Simultaneously, the Philippine Atmospheric, Geophysical and Astronomical Services Administration (PAGASA) began releasing warnings in relation to the tropical depression with the local name Milenyo. The Joint Typhoon Warning Center (JTWC; a joint United States Navy – Air Force agency that monitors tropical cyclones globally) issued a Tropical Cyclone Formation Alert around the same time, designating the disturbance Tropical Depression 18W at 12:00 UTC. The system quickly organized as it drifted westward, and according to both the JMA and the JTWC, it attained tropical storm intensity near 00:00 UTC on September 26. Consequently, it received the international name Xangsane.

The storm began to accelerate in forward speed and shift its direction toward the west-northwest, attaining typhoon intensity at 18:00 UTC on September 26. At the time, it was centered about 390 mi (630 km) east-southeast of Manila, the capital city of the Philippines. Over the next several hours, Xangsane rapidly intensified as it approached the archipelago; the JMA estimates that the typhoon achieved its maximum 10-minute sustained winds of 155 km/h (96 mph) early on September 27, with a corresponding central pressure of 940 millibars (28 inHg). According to the JTWC, the typhoon peaked with 1-minute winds of 230 km/h (140 mph), corresponding to Category 4 strength on the Saffir–Simpson hurricane wind scale. The center of the powerful storm skirted the northern coast of Samar and continued west-northwestward. With a well-defined eye evident on visible satellite imagery, Xangsane struck southern Luzon around 12:00 UTC, and remained over the Philippines for the next day or so. Due to extensive interaction with land, the typhoon's structure deteriorated, and the JMA downgraded it to a severe tropical storm early on September 28. Xangsane traveled over the Manila area early on September 28 before entering the South China Sea and turning due west, steered by the subtropical ridge to its north over mainland China.

Over open waters, the system encountered conditions favorable for renewed intensification, including warm sea surface temperatures, light vertical wind shear, and strong upper-level divergence. As a result, it reattained typhoon status by 18:00 UTC on September 28. Continued strengthening yielded a secondary peak on September 29, marked by 10-minute winds of 150 km/h (93 mph), according to the JMA, and 1-minute winds of 215 km/h (134 mph) as ascertained by the JTWC. Tracking westward at around 17 km/h (11 mph), Xangsane maintained its intensity until it neared Vietnam, when dry air and land interaction began to slowly diminish the typhoon on September 30. Just after 00:00 UTC on October 1, the system made landfall along the central coast of Vietnam, near Da Nang. At the time, Xangsane was a low-end typhoon, with 10-minute winds of 130 km/h (81 mph). The lowest sea-level pressure measured at a weather station in Da Nang during the storm was 963.3 hPa (28.45 inHg). The storm quickly declined in force as it progressed inland through Indochina: it weakened to a severe tropical storm around 12:00 UTC, and to a tropical storm six hours later. Although the JTWC issued its final warning on Xangsane just after landfall, the agency continued to track the storm until 00:00 on October 2. At the same time, the JMA downgraded Xangsane to a tropical depression; it dissipated later that day, over Thailand.

== Preparations ==
Impact by country
Island	Fatalities	Injuries
Philippines	196	300
Vietnam	72	532
Thailand	48	—N/a
Total		
Sources cited in text.

=== Philippines ===
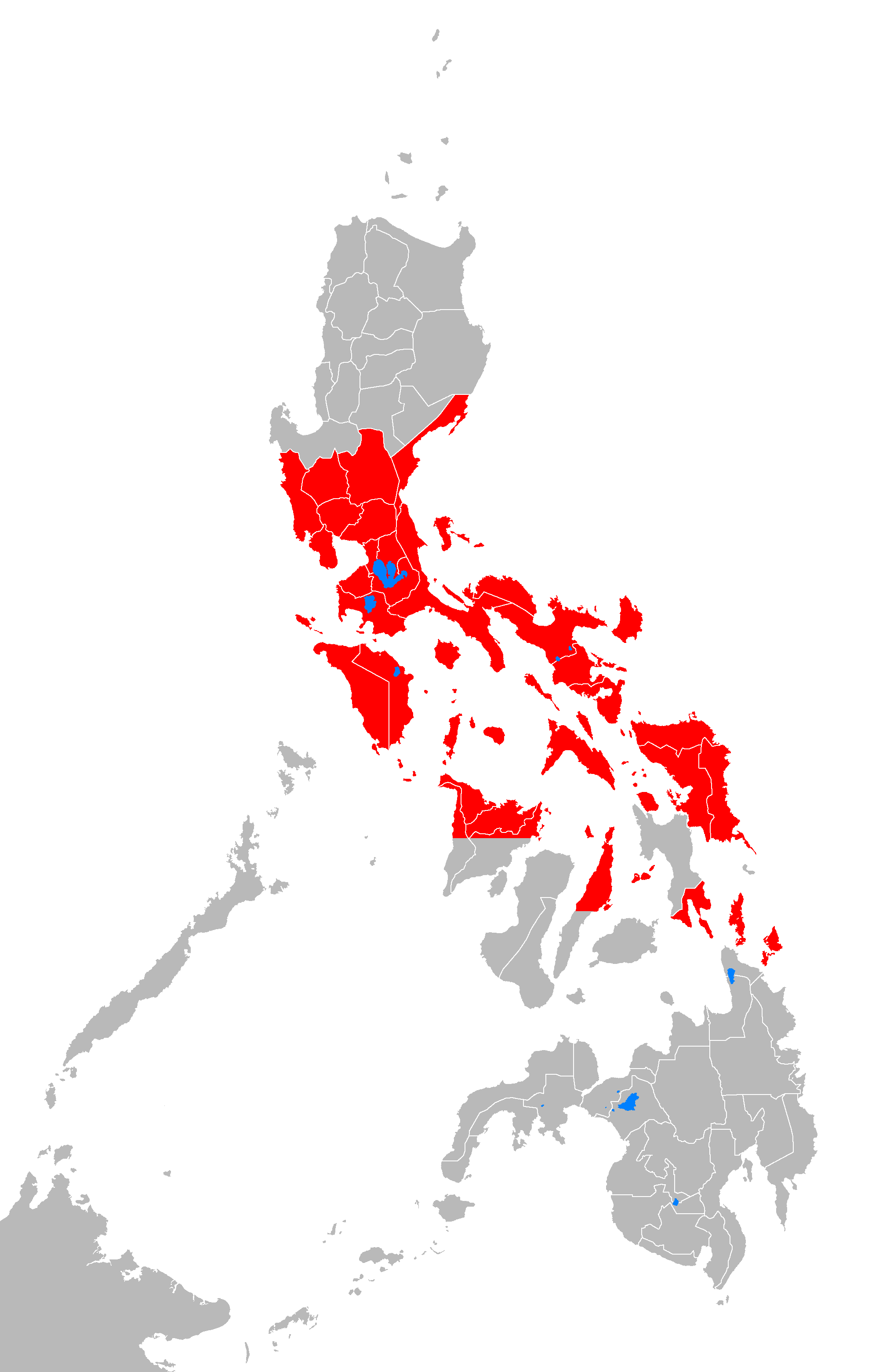
Provinces of the Philippines in which public storm signals were raised for preparations against Typhoon Milenyo.

On September 27, PAGASA issued Storm Signal Number 3, a warning for winds of 100–185 km/h (62–115 mph), for areas of southern Luzon. Storm Signal Number 2, for winds of 60–100 km/h (37–62 mph), was raised for northern Samar Island and central Luzon. Storm Signal Number 1 (30–60 km/h, 20–37 mph) was issued for northwestern Luzon, including Metro Manila, and northern Visayas, including the rest of Samar Island. Schools in the warned area were suspended, and airports and seaports were closed. Philippine Airlines cancelled over half of its flights to and from Ninoy Aquino International Airport for September 28, and various transit services also suspended service. Metro Manila and the Tagalog provinces were warned of possible flooding and strong winds.

When it became clear that Xangsane would approach the Capital, PAGASA upgraded the warning for Manila and central Luzon to Storm Signal Number 3 on September 28. All the storm signals were discontinued later that day.

=== Vietnam ===
Prior to Xangsane's final landfall, the Vietnamese government set up a steering committee headed by Deputy Prime Minister Nguyễn Sinh Hùng to oversee evacuations and storm preparations throughout central Vietnam. Provincial and local authorities evacuated over 300,000 people from low-lying areas along the coast from Hà Tĩnh to Phú Yên, as well as hilly areas prone to landslides. The Vietnamese government also ordered about 2,400 boats, including 273 fishing boats, to return to port. Vietnam Airlines, the national airline, cancelled or diverted all flights on September 30 and October 1. These efforts were carried out in order to prevent a repeat of the damage and fatalities caused by Typhoon Chanchu earlier in the season.

=== Thailand ===
Although Xangsane had weakened considerably over land, residents of northern Thailand were advised of the threat of flooding from the remnant low of Xangsane as it approached. The Department of Disaster Prevention and Mitigation alerted its provincial offices throughout the country to be prepared for strong winds, flash flooding, and landslides. Residents in highland areas were also warned of possible mudslides, and the army was dispatched to aid in regional storm preparations.

== Impact ==
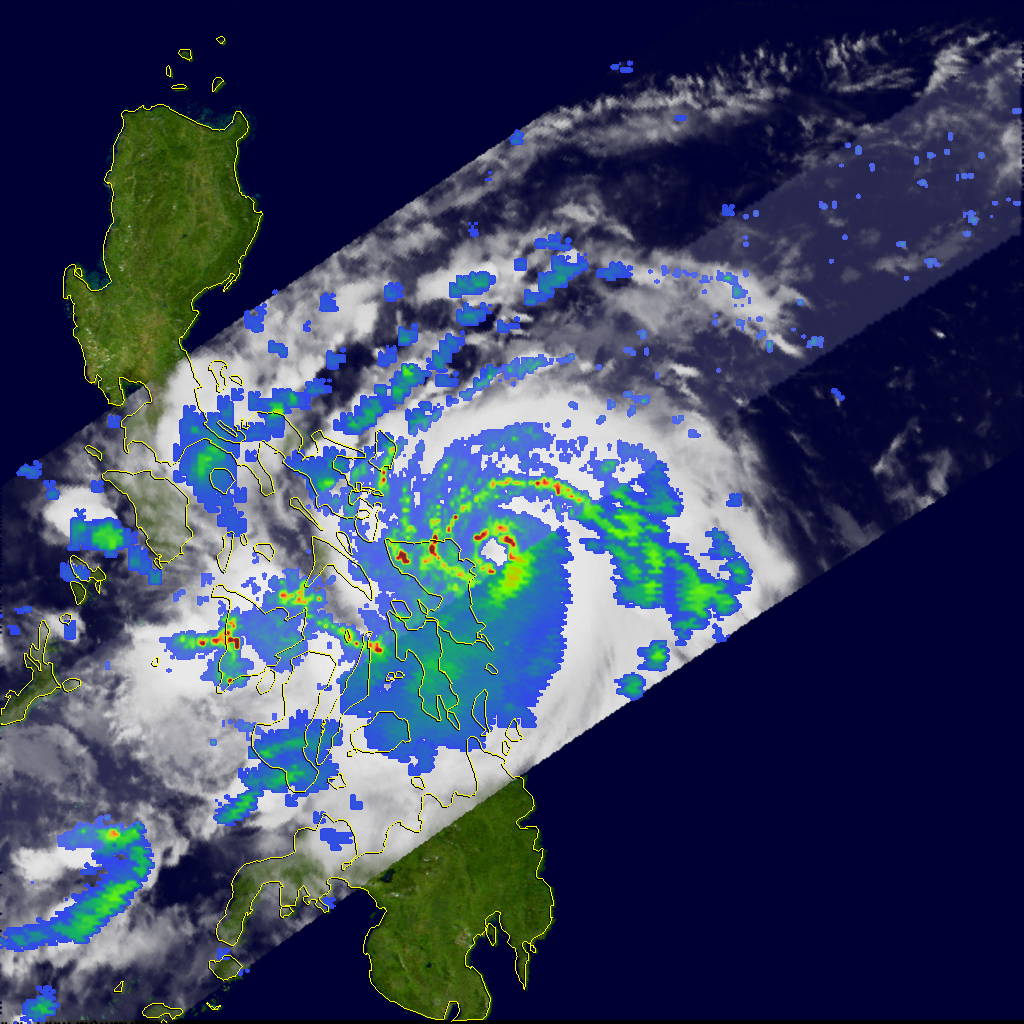
TRMM image showing Xangsane's well-defined eyewall prior to its first landfall

=== Philippines ===
Damage was widespread in the Philippines, particularly in Metro Manila, where the typhoon passed almost directly over. Power and water was lost in several provinces, while overflowing rivers caused flooding, landslides and made roads impassable. In some parts of the country, electricity was cut off for up to six days straight. Many trees and billboards were toppled by Xangsane, while Luzon suffered an island-wide power outage. Rough waters and seaport closures left at least 3,400 people and nearly 270 vehicles stranded in ports and terminals, mainly at the primary ferry crossing between Samar Island and Bicol Region. Local and provincial officials described Xangsane as the worst typhoon to directly impact Manila since Typhoon Angela passed over the city eleven years ago.

A damaged and blown off roadside shelter in Roxas Boulevard after Xangsane traversed Metro Manila on September 28.

The Philippine government estimated that approximately 2 million people in 19 provinces were affected by Xangsane, which destroyed many homes and farms on its path through the islands. The local and regional Philippine National Red Cross chapters reported major damage in at least 116 municipalities, 12 cities, and a total of 1,295 barangays across the country. Torrential rains from Milenyo also caused flooding and landslides in Laguna, Cavite, and Quezon. Xangsane caused the destruction of the Calumpang Dam in the Municipality of Liliw, which channeled water to irrigation canals around the area. In all, Milenyo was responsible for 197 deaths and 5.9 billion Philippine pesos ($118 million, 2006 USD) in damage, mostly to personal property and agriculture.

=== Vietnam ===
On the morning of October 1, Typhoon Xangsane made landfall in Da Nang and was considered the most powerful tropical cyclone to strike Vietnam between 1986 and 2006. A weather station in Da Nang recorded sustained winds of 137 km/h (85 mph) and gusts up to 158 km/h (98 mph), while another station in Tam Kỳ (Quảng Nam) measured wind gusts of 137 km/h (85 mph). Rainfall in some areas exceeded 600 mm, including 619 mm (24.37 in) in Yên Thượng (Nghệ An) and 616 mm (24.25 in) in Nam Đông (Thừa Thiên Huế). The typhoon resulted in 72 deaths, 4 people reported missing, and economic losses estimated at 10,150 billion VND ($633 million, 2006 USD).

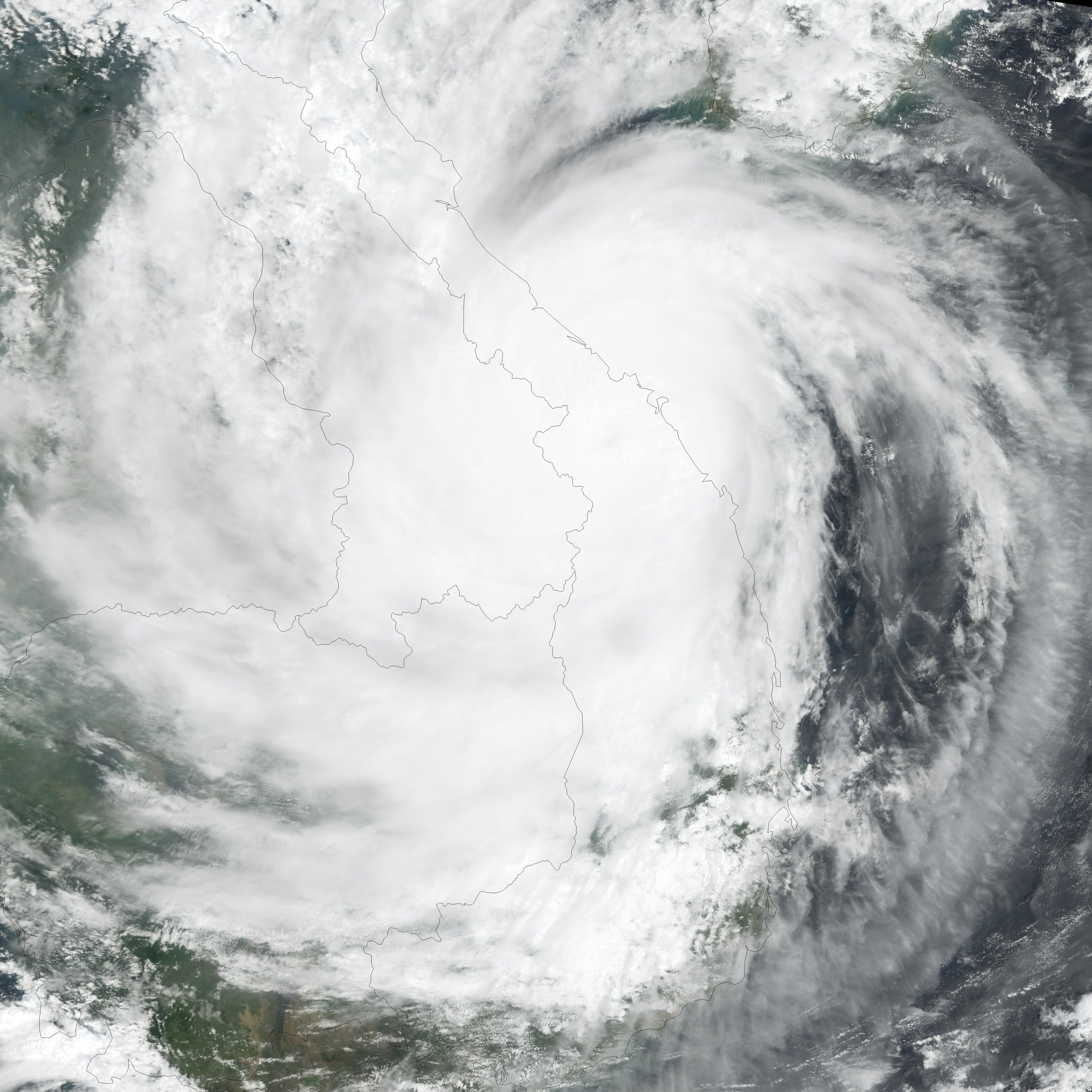
Xangsane inland over eastern Indochina

The worst structural damage occurred in the city of Da Nang, where 26 people were killed. The provinces of Quảng Nam and Nghệ An were also hard hit, with a total of 25 people killed. The storm damaged or destroyed around 320,000 homes, downed thousands of trees and power lines, and flooded major streets.

Significant agricultural damage was reported, especially in Quảng Bình Province. More than 3,000 square kilometres (1,200 mi^{2}) of crops, mostly rice, were damaged or washed away by the floodwaters. There were also reports of heavy losses of poultry and livestock, and nearly 13 km^{2} (5.0 sq mi) of aquaculture and 786 fishing boats were lost.

=== Thailand ===
The remnants of Xangsane moved over Thailand on October 2 and combined with monsoonal moisture over the north central part of the country, causing torrential rains and severe flooding in over 35 provinces. Floodwaters broke through levees and barriers and flooded or damaged nearly 1.3 million rai (2,100 km^{2}; 510,000 acres) of farmland and local infrastructure. Many municipalities reported flooding of up to three meters (9.8 feet), and the municipality of Ang Thong reported flooding of 60 cm (2.0 ft). The Department of Disaster Prevention and Mitigation reported 47 deaths, and villages in several provinces reported significant levels of water pollution and waterborne illnesses from stagnant waters.

== Aftermath ==
=== Philippines ===
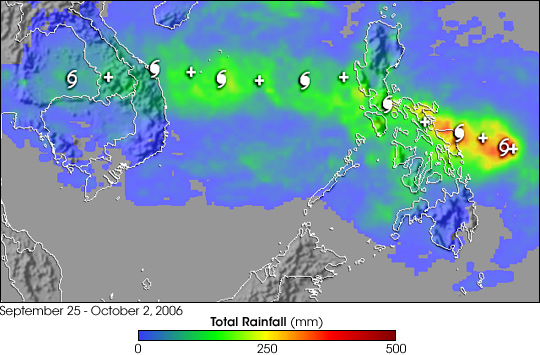
This image shows rainfall totals for Southeast Asia for September 25 – October 2, 2006 estimated in part from data collected by the Tropical Rainfall Measuring Mission satellite. Storm symbols mark out the path of the typhoon. Totals of over a foot are shown over Samar in the east-central Philippines (red areas). A broad area of 4- to 8-inch totals (green) stretches from the central Philippines to the coast of Vietnam.

Following the passage of Xangsane, the International Federation of Red Cross and Red Crescent Societies (IFRC) issued an emergency request for 5.7 million Swiss francs ($4.6 million, 2006 USD) to aid the Philippine Red Cross in its relief effort. In addition, the movement dispatched 3,000 workers and three disaster response teams to affected areas for search and rescue missions, damage assessments, and assistance to people affected by the typhoon. The Philippine Red Cross provided canned goods, rice, clothing, and personal hygiene items to over 6,300 families, and local volunteers provided assistance to people in shelters. The Spanish Red Cross, present since 1998 as a backup to the Philippine Red Cross, also sent officials, logistics equipment, and water purification systems to the more heavily areas to aid in disaster relief and damage assessments.

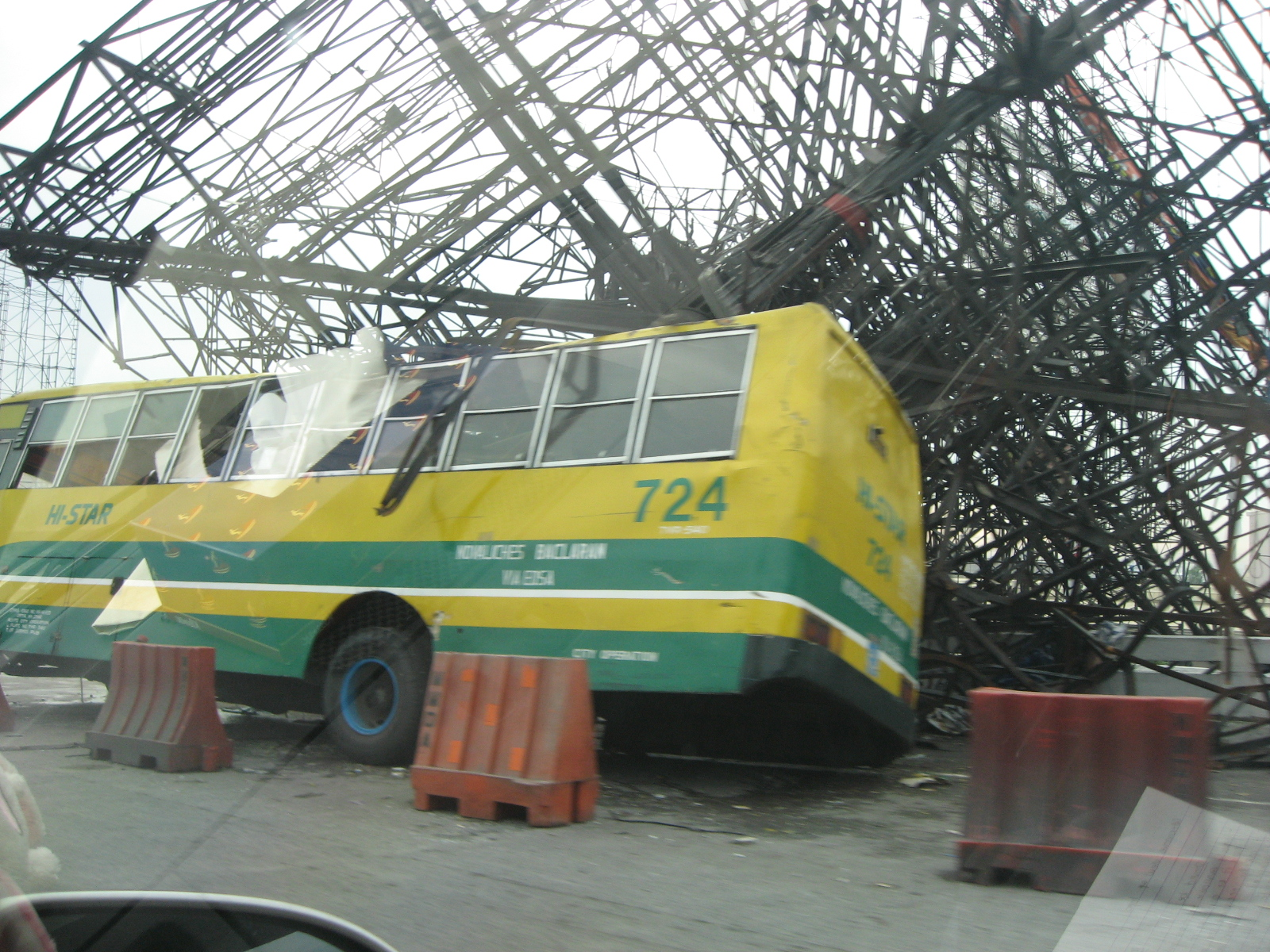
A passenger bus is crushed by a billboard structure along EDSA at the Magallanes interchange in Makati.

In Manila, fallen billboards killed several people and caused traffic delays along EDSA, the main highway of the metropolis. This prompted some members of the Senate of the Philippines to push for the removal and banning of billboard advertising in the Manila area, which had been an issue for some time. Senator Miriam Defensor Santiago wrote an appeal to President Gloria Macapagal Arroyo, asking her to approve the "Anti-Billboard Blight Act of 2006", which would ban billboard advertising on major thoroughfares within Metro Manila.

=== Vietnam ===
On October 3, the IFRC released 100,000 Swiss francs ($80,300, 2006 USD) from its disaster relief fund to support the Red Cross of Vietnam, and issued an emergency appeal for 1 million Swiss francs ($810,000, 2006 USD) in aid the next day. The Vietnamese government also released 100 billion Vietnamese đồng ($6.2 million, 2006 USD) and 1,500 metric tons (1,650 short tons) of rice from the national food security stock to help the recovery effort in central Vietnam. The National Fatherland Front also issued an appeal to national and international organizations for donations and aid. According to Vietnam Television's report prior to the impact of Typhoon Noru in late September 2022, due to the over-strengthen the storm was that the national observation agencies decided to upgrade typhoon level from 12 to 17.

On October 13, a minivan carrying a relief team from a local government in Phú Nhuận district, Ho Chi Minh City to Da Nang was caught in an accident while driving on National Route 1 through Diên Khánh district, Khánh Hòa province, killing 12 out of 15 aid workers.

=== Thailand ===
The Department of Disaster Prevention and Mitigation and the Thai Red Cross Society evacuated residents from areas of central Thailand that had been affected by flooding from the remnants of Xangsane. The Red Cross also provided victims and evacuees with food and emergency kits, and several Red Cross health centers in 12 provinces issued emergency relief kits, drinking water, and medicine kits to at least 16,000 families in flood-stricken areas.

=== Retirement ===
As a result of the deaths and damage caused, it was decided at the 39th annual meeting of the ESCAP/WMO Typhoon Committee in Manila in December 2006 that the name Xangsane, along with four others, would be retired from the name list. In December 2007, the committee selected the name Leepi to replace Xangsane on the Western Pacific basin name lists beginning in 2008. PAGASA removed Milenyo from its naming list and replaced it with Mario.

== See also ==
- Weather of 2006
- Tropical cyclones in 2006
- List of Philippine typhoons (2000–present)
