= List of storms named Monica =

The name Monica has been used for three tropical cyclones in the Northeastern Pacific Ocean:

- Tropical Storm Monica (1967), which spent its life at sea south of Mexico
- Hurricane Monica (1971), did not affect land
- Tropical Storm Monica (1975), stayed far from land

In the Southern Hemisphere near Australia:

- Tropical Cyclone Monica (1984), formed west of New Caledonia, dissipated in the Coral Sea
- Cyclone Monica (2006), struck the Northern Territory
