= Tropical Storm Mario (2025) =

Eastern Pacific tropical storm in 2025

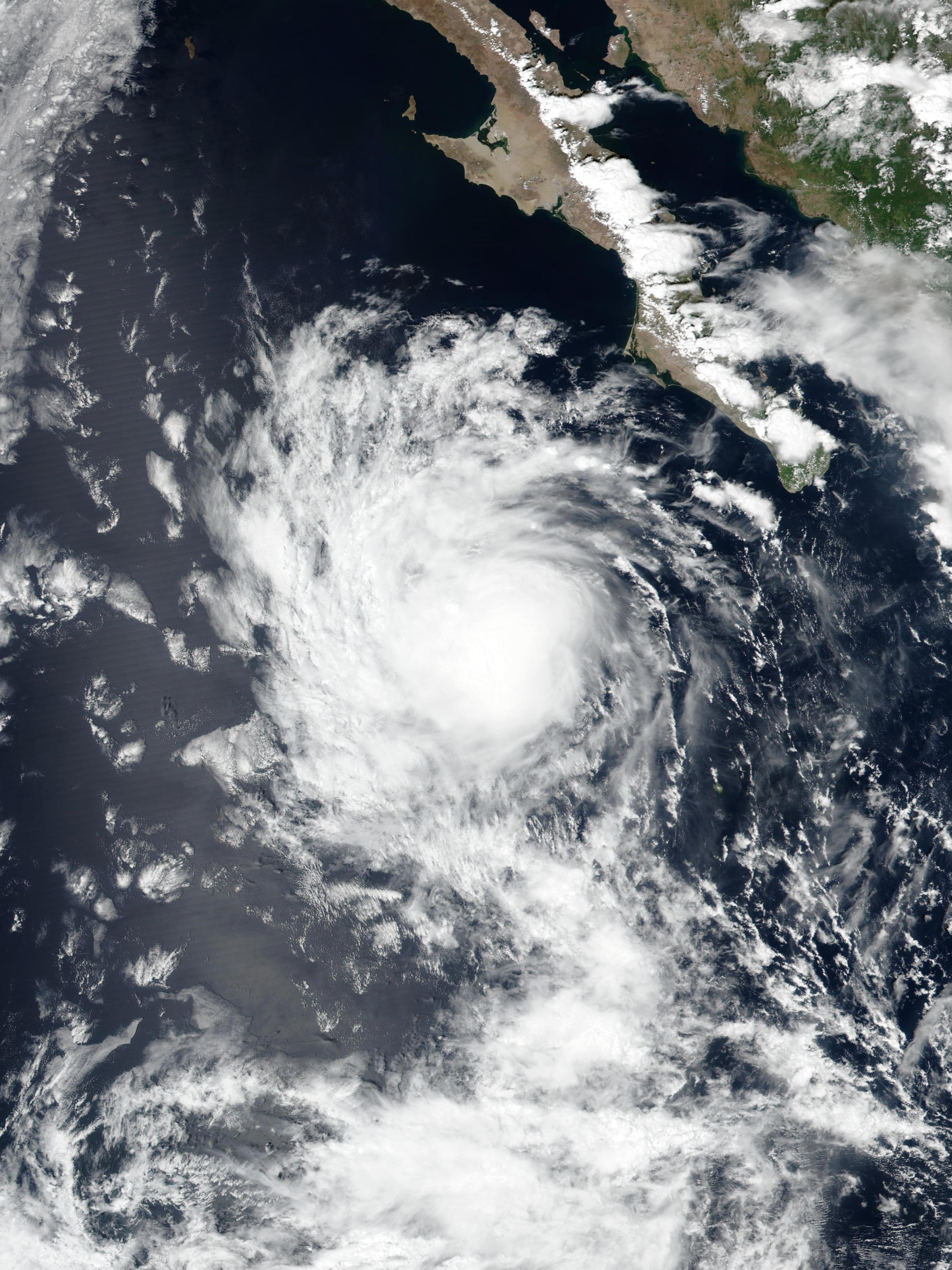
- Mario at its secondary peak intensity west of Baja California Sur on September 16

Meteorological history
- Formed: September 11, 2025
- Remnant low: September 16, 2025
- Dissipated: September 18, 2025

Tropical storm
- 1-minute sustained (SSHWS/NWS)
- Highest winds: 65 mph (100 km/h)
- Lowest pressure: 994 mbar (hPa); 29.35 inHg

Overall effects
- Fatalities: 2
- Damage: $40.7 million (2025 USD)
- Areas affected: Southern Mexico, Northern Mexico, Southwestern United States
- IBTrACS
- Part of the 2025 Pacific hurricane season

Tropical Storm Mario was a compact tropical cyclone that affected parts of western Mexico and the Southwestern United States in September 2025. The fifteenth named storm of the 2025 Pacific hurricane season, Mario developed from a tropical wave that moved off the coast of Central America on September 8. The wave turned northwestward developed into a tropical storm on September 12. However, an unfavorable environment for intensification caused Mario to open up into a trough early on September 13. The remnants of Mario moved westward and redeveloped into a tropical storm on September 14. As Mario moved west-northwestward to northwestward, it began to intensify. By September 15, Mario attained its peak intensity with maximum sustained winds of 65 mph (100 km/h) and a minimum central pressure of 994 mbar (29.35 inHg). Shortly after, Mario began to weaken and degenerated into a remnant low by September 16. Mario then dissipated on September 18.

In anticipation of Mario, the Government of Mexico issued a tropical storm watch for coastal portions of Michoacán. Remnant moisture from Mario brought heavy rainfall that triggered flash flooding and mudslides across portions of Baja California Sur and the Southwestern United States. While Mario passed offshore the Baja California peninsula, floodwaters damaged at least 62 homes in San Ignacio. Overall, Mario caused two deaths and US$40.7 million worth of damage.

== Meteorological history ==
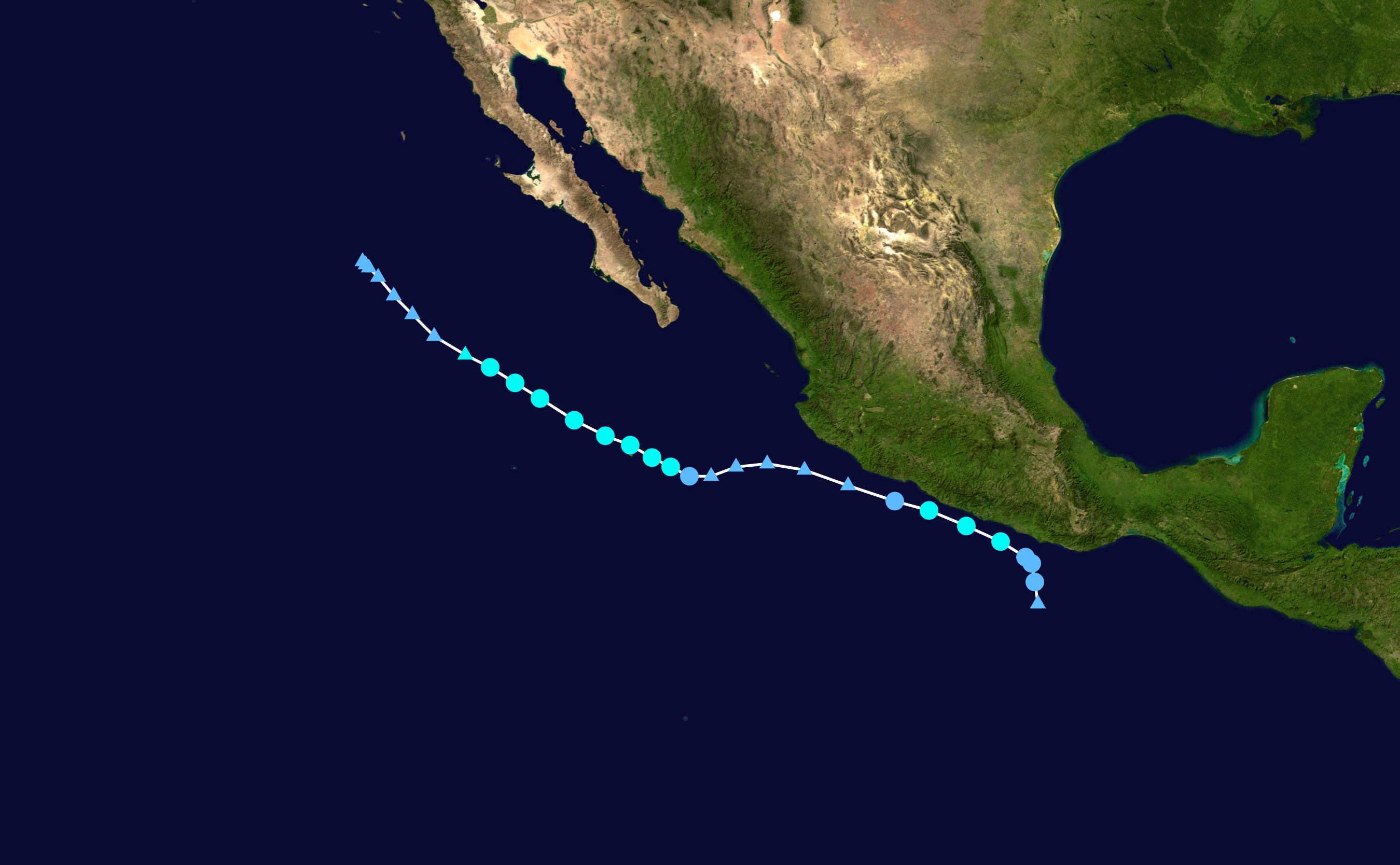
Map plotting the storm's track and intensity, according to the Saffir–Simpson scale Map key Saffir–Simpson scale Tropical depression (≤38 mph, ≤62 km/h) Tropical storm (39–73 mph, 63–118 km/h) Category 1 (74–95 mph, 119–153 km/h) Category 2 (96–110 mph, 154–177 km/h) Category 3 (111–129 mph, 178–208 km/h) Category 4 (130–156 mph, 209–251 km/h) Category 5 (≥157 mph, ≥252 km/h) Unknown Storm type Tropical cyclone Subtropical cyclone Extratropical cyclone, remnant low, tropical disturbance, or monsoon depression

On September 8, 2025, a tropical wave emerged off the coast of Central America. The wave began moving westward and an area of low pressure formed within the wave on September 10. The low turned northwestward and began to organize. On September 11 at 06:00 UTC, the system acquired a center of circulation, developing into a tropical depression while situated 185 mi (295 km) southeast of Acapulco, Mexico. The depression moved west-northwestward due to the influence of a ridge situated over northern Mexico and Texas. On September 12 at 00:00 UTC, the depression strengthened into a tropical storm and was named Mario, while located 80 mi (130 km) southeast of Acapulco. However, moderate northeasterly wind shear, dry air intrusions, and land interaction caused convection within Mario to decrease. Additionally, a developing area of low-pressure south of Mario began to cause the storm to dissipate. As a result, Mario opened up into a surface trough by September 13 at 00:00 UTC.

The remnants of Mario began to turn westward. Shortly after, convection within the system began to increase and Mario re-acquired a center of circulation. As a result, Mario redeveloped into a tropical depression by September 14 at 06:00 UTC. By 12:00 UTC the same day, Mario restrengthened into a tropical storm while situated 310 mi (500 km) south of the Baja California peninsula. Mario began moving westward to west-northwestward under the influence of a ridge over northern Mexico and a trough offshore the Baja California Peninsula. Within an environment characterized by warm sea surface temperatures and low vertical wind shear, Mario began to intensify. Convection began to increase within the center of Mario and banding features began to appear on the northern side of the storm. On September 15 at 12:00 UTC, Mario reached peak intensity with maximum sustained winds of 65 mph (100 km/h) and a minimum central pressure of 994 mbar (29.35 inHg) while located 280 mi (455 km) southwest of the Baja California Peninsula. Mario then moved into an environment with cooler waters and higher vertical wind shear. As a result, Mario began to quickly weaken with all convection within Mario beginning to collapse. By September 16 at 12:00 UTC, Mario degenerated to a remnant low while moving northwestward and slowing its forward motion speed. By September 18 at 12:00 UTC, the low degenerated to a trough of low pressure and dissipated while situated 460 mi (740 km) west of Cabo San Lazaro, Baja California Sur.

== Preparations and impact ==
=== Mexico ===
On September 12, the government of Mexico issued a tropical storm watch from Lázaro Cárdenas, Michoacán to Punta San Telmo, Michoacán. Civil Protection personnel were deployed to coastal portions of the state. The ports of Lázaro Cárdenas, Zihuatanejo, and Acapulco were closed to boat traffic. Classes for all grades in coastal regions of Guerrero and Michoacán were cancelled in anticipation of Mario. A green emergency alert, signifying a low level of danger, was issued for Jalisco. A blue emergency alert, signifying a minimal level of danger, was issued for Guerrero and Oaxaca. An Independence Day dance event in Mulegé was cancelled.

While Mario made its closest approach to the southwestern coast of Mexico, more than 6 in (150 mm) of rain fell in a 24-hour period across portions of Guerrero and Colima. A peak wind gust of 35 mph (60 km/h) was reported at Acapulco International Airport. Heavy rainfall from the precursor of Mario was reported in Chiapas, resulting in the inundation of fifteen homes and 27 neighborhoods. In Guerrero, heavy rains caused flooding and landslides while strong winds downed trees and utility poles, resulting in minor electrical and communication outages.

When Mario degenerated to a remnant low, a trough advected remnant moisture from Mario northward into Baja California Sur. Heavy rainfall that triggered flash flooding was reported across the state. In San Ignacio, at least six neighborhoods and 62 homes were inundated by floodwaters, leaving around 250 families homeless. Two shelters were opened for 20 residents whose homes suffered severe flood damage. Floodwaters washed out two sections of the Transpeninsular Highway in San Ignacio, trapping a tank truck and leaving the community isolated for three days. Several people were rescued after floodwaters trapped two vehicles. Three fallen utility poles were reported, causing disruptions to electrical service in Ciudad Constitución. Power outages affected operations at ten schools across Mulegé. Flooding caused sewage to flood onto streets across Los Cabos. In San Ignacio, a 37-year-old man was killed by lightning.

=== United States ===
Remnants of Mario bring heavy rainfall to Southern California

In anticipation of the remnants of Mario, portions of the Southwestern United States were placed under a slight risk of excessive rainfall. Flash flood watches and warnings were issued throughout Central and Southern California. Additionally, the National Interagency Fire Center placed portions of California under a moderate fire risk, warning that dry lightning could spark fires.

Heavy rainfall that triggered flash flooding and mudslides was reported as the remnants of Mario passed through California. Running Springs recorded a rainfall total of 4.14 in (105 mm) while Ridgecrest recorded a rainfall total of 3.17 in (81 mm). Imperial County recorded a wind gust of 65 mph (105 km/h). Imperial Irrigation District reported the storm downed more than 100 utility poles, leaving nearly 7,000 customers without power. In San Bernardino County, fourteen homes were damaged and an additional three homes were destroyed by mudslides. In the San Bernardino Mountains, debris flows trapped at least six vehicles, resulting in the rescue of ten people. In Cabazon, two people were injured in a seven-vehicle collision as a result of hazardous driving conditions caused by inclement weather. Flooding left several roadways impassable at Death Valley National Park. In the San Bernardino National Forest, several sections of California State Route 38 were washed out by floodwaters, leading Caltrans to launch a US$9.7 million project to restore damaged sections of the road. Additionally, sections of California State Route 178 and California State Route 62 were damaged by floodwaters. Officials estimated the cost to repair roads damaged by the storm at US$40.7 million. In Barstow, a toddler was killed and his father was injured after their vehicle was swept away by floodwaters.

The remnants of Mario also generated severe thunderstorms across portions of Nevada and Arizona. In the Phoenix metropolitan area, Arizona Public Service reported that lightning activity left around 1,800 customers without power. In Gila County, heavy rainfall caused flash flooding along roadways, resulting in the rescue of five children.

== See also ==
- Weather of 2025
- Tropical cyclones in 2025
- Other tropical cyclones of the same name
- List of Baja California Peninsula hurricanes
- List of California hurricanes
