= List of storms named Miriam =

The name Miriam has been used for eight tropical cyclones in the Eastern Pacific Ocean.

- Hurricane Miriam (1978), a Category 1 hurricane that threatened Hawaii but did not affect land.
- Hurricane Miriam (1982), a Category 1 hurricane that did not affect land.
- Tropical Storm Miriam (1988), continuation of Hurricane Joan which originally formed in the Atlantic Ocean and crossed into the Pacific.
- Tropical Storm Miriam (1994), a short-lived storm that did not affect land.
- Tropical Storm Miriam (2000), a short-lived storm that hit Baja California as a weak storm.
- Tropical Storm Miriam (2006), a short-lived tropical storm that did not affect land.
- Hurricane Miriam (2012), a Category 3 hurricane that did not affect land.
- Hurricane Miriam (2018), a Category 2 hurricane that did not affect land.
