= List of storms named Marge =

The name Marge has been used for 12 tropical cyclones in the Northwest Pacific Ocean.

- Tropical Storm Marge (1945)
- Typhoon Marge (1951)
- Typhoon Marge (1955)
- Tropical Storm Marge (1962)
- Tropical Storm Marge (1964)
- Typhoon Marge (1967)
- Tropical Storm Marge (1970)
- Typhoon Marge (1973)
- Tropical Storm Marge (1976)
- Typhoon Marge (1980)
- Typhoon Marge (1983)
- Typhoon Marge (1986)
