= List of storms named Michael =

The name Michael was used for three tropical cyclones in the Atlantic Ocean:

- Hurricane Michael (2000) – a Category 2 hurricane that affected Canada.
- Hurricane Michael (2012) – a Category 3 hurricane that did not affect land.
- Hurricane Michael (2018) – a Category 5 hurricane that formed near Central America, causing heavy flooding as it lingered over the area as a tropical depression. Later rapidly intensified over the Gulf of Mexico, making landfall in Florida at peak intensity. Michael caused at least 74 fatalities and an estimated $25.1 billion (2018 USD) in damages.

The World Meteorological Organization retired the name Michael from future use after the 2018 season. Michael was replaced with Milton for the 2024 season.

== See also ==
- List of storms named Mike – a similar name that has been used in three tropical cyclone basins
- List of storms named Mitchell – a similar name that has been used in the Australian region
