= List of storms named Matthew =

The name Matthew was used for three tropical cyclones in the Atlantic Ocean, replacing Mitch after 1998.

- Tropical Storm Matthew (2004) - brought heavy rain to the Gulf Coast of Louisiana, causing light damage but no deaths.
- Tropical Storm Matthew (2010) - made landfall in Central America and later moved into Mexico, causing $171 million in damages and 126 deaths.
- Hurricane Matthew (2016) - an intense Category 5 hurricane that caused $15.1 billion in damages and at least 603 deaths throughout the Caribbean and the United States.

After the 2016 storm, the name was retired and replaced with Martin for the 2022 season.
