= List of storms named Melanie =

The name Melanie has been used for two tropical cyclones in the Australian region.

- Cyclone Melanie (1996), a Category 4 tropical cyclone that crossed into the Indian Ocean, where it was renamed Bellamine.
- Cyclone Melanie (2007), a Category 2 tropical cyclone that did not affect land.
