= List of storms named Mabel =

The name Mabel has been used for two tropical cyclones worldwide, one in the Western Pacific Ocean and one in the Australian Region.

In the Western Pacific Ocean:

- Typhoon Mabel (1948) – a strong typhoon that remained out to sea.

In the Australian region:

- Cyclone Mabel (1981) – a Category 5 severe tropical cyclone that minimal impact Western Australia.
