= Tropical Storm Melissa (2019) =

Atlantic nor'easter and tropical storm

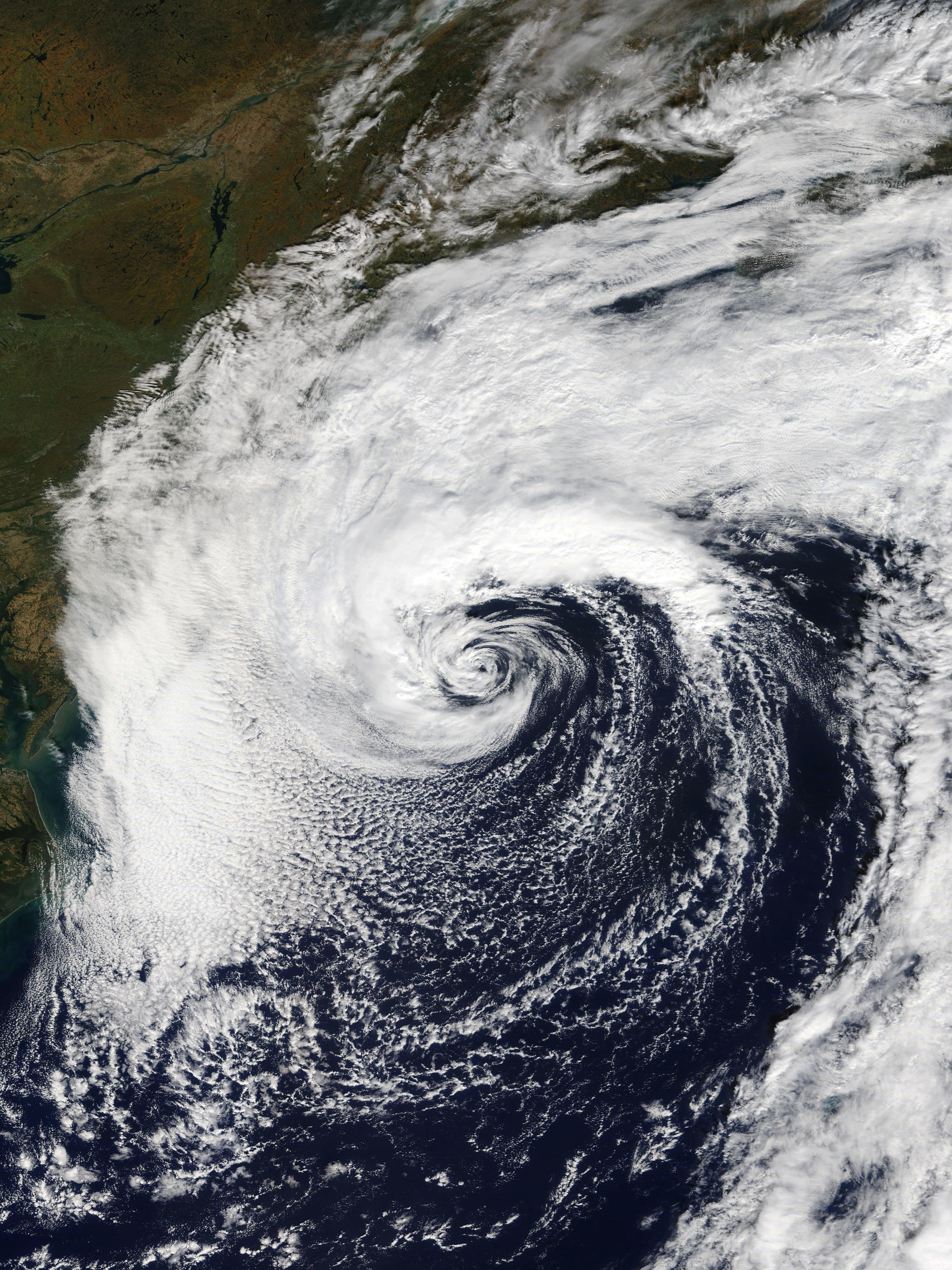
- Tropical Storm Melissa at peak intensity as a subtropical storm on October 11

Meteorological history
- Formed: October 11, 2019
- Dissipated: October 14, 2019

Tropical storm
- 1-minute sustained (SSHWS/NWS)
- Highest winds: 65 mph (100 km/h)
- Lowest pressure: 994 mbar (hPa); 29.35 inHg

Overall effects
- Fatalities: None reported
- Damage: $24,000 (2019 USD)
- Areas affected: Southeastern United States, Mid-Atlantic States, New England, Atlantic Canada
- IBTrACS
- Part of the 2019 Atlantic hurricane season

Tropical Storm Melissa was a nor'easter and a short-lived tropical cyclone that affected portions of the East Coast of the United States and Atlantic Canada in October 2019. The fourteenth depression and thirteenth named storm of the 2019 Atlantic hurricane season, Melissa originated from a cold front that developed over the southwestern Atlantic on October 6. The system developed tropical storm-force winds on October 8, before becoming a nor'easter on the next day. The system then began to organize, and was designated as Subtropical Storm Melissa on October 11. Melissa was then upgraded into a tropical storm the following day. However, the storm soon began to disorganize and transition into an extratropical low by October 14, before dissipating later that same day.

The storm and its precursor brought strong winds, heavy rainfall, rough surf, and coastal flooding to the Mid-Atlantic States and New England. Numerous trees and power lines were downed in Massachusetts and Rhode Island. Meanwhile, coastal floods inundated communities mainly along the coasts of Delaware and Maryland. In the United States, damage from Melissa totaled to around $24,000 (2019 USD). As the storm moved out to sea, high winds and power outages were reported in Nova Scotia. No fatalities were reported in association with Melissa.

== Meteorological history ==
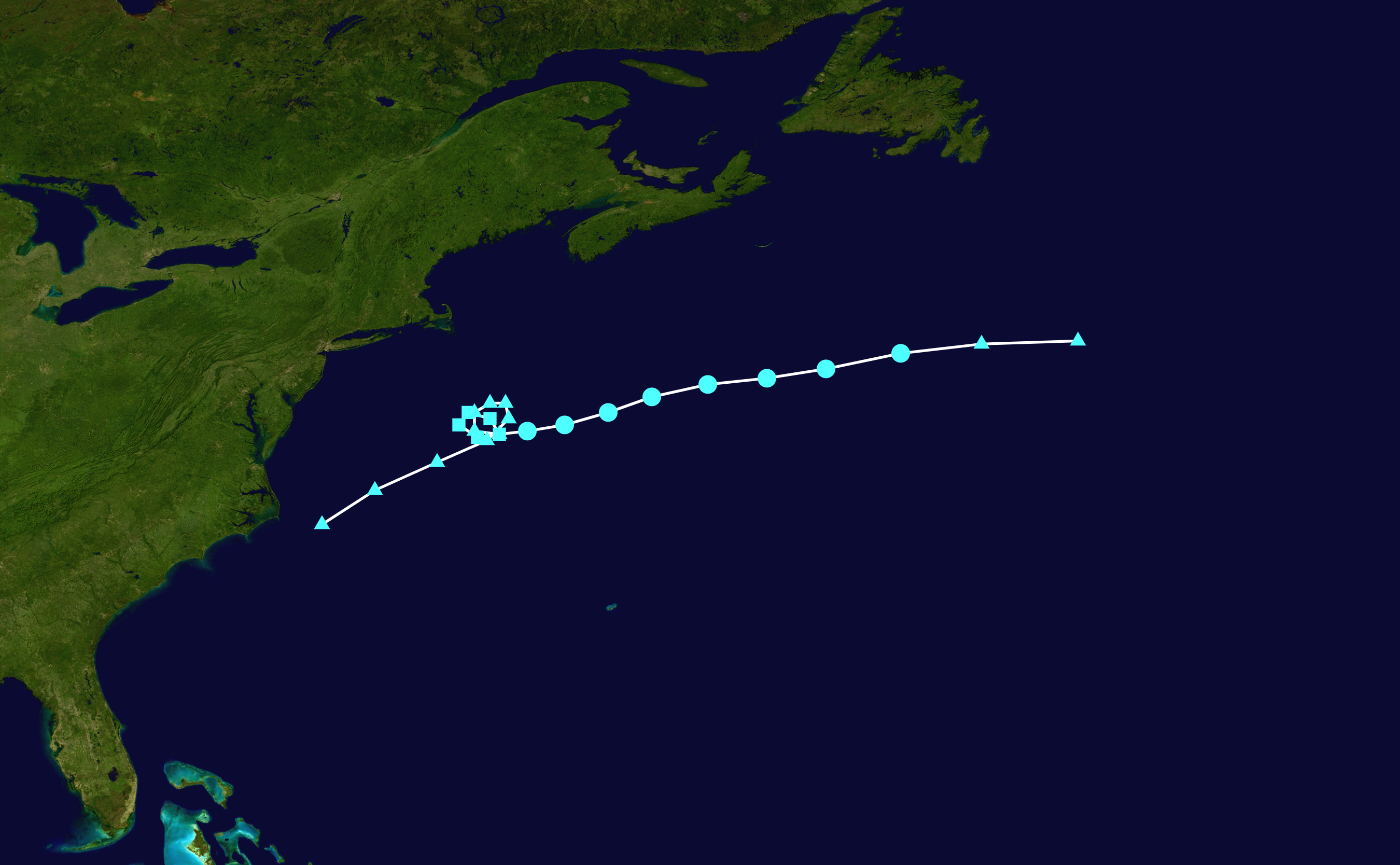
Map plotting the storm's track and intensity, according to the Saffir–Simpson scale Map key Saffir–Simpson scale Tropical depression (≤38 mph, ≤62 km/h) Tropical storm (39–73 mph, 63–118 km/h) Category 1 (74–95 mph, 119–153 km/h) Category 2 (96–110 mph, 154–177 km/h) Category 3 (111–129 mph, 178–208 km/h) Category 4 (130–156 mph, 209–251 km/h) Category 5 (≥157 mph, ≥252 km/h) Unknown Storm type Tropical cyclone Subtropical cyclone Extratropical cyclone, remnant low, tropical disturbance, or monsoon depression

On October 6, a cold front stalled over the southwestern Atlantic Ocean. The cold front began to lift to the northwest, due to an incoming mid-latitude trough across the eastern United States. By 18:00 UTC on October 8, a frontal low began to produce tropical storm-force winds, while located roughly 80 miles (130 km) east of Cape Hatteras, North Carolina. The frontal low began to intensify offshore the Mid-Atlantic States on October 9, before merging with an occluded front the next day. The system then began to meander to the southeast of New England after being designated as a strong nor’easter. The low then became detached from the occluded front with deep convection developing north of the system’s center, early on October 11. By 6:00 UTC that day, the low was designated as Subtropical Storm Melissa, while located around 210 miles (340 km) south-southeast of Nantucket, Massachusetts. It was designated as a subtropical cyclone due to its large radius of gale-force winds and its association with an upper-level low.

Melissa continued to meander offshore New England for the next 36 hours, as deep convection waned and sustained winds decreased. The next day, convection began to increase near the center of the storm. At 12:00 UTC that same day, Melissa was upgraded into a tropical storm after the storm’s gale-force wind field significantly contracted while located about 265 miles (425 km) south-southeast of Nantucket. However just a few hours later, westerly wind shear began to degrade convection from the western side of the storm. By 9:00 UTC on October 13, deep convection had become separated from the low-level center, and the structure of the system became disorganized.

Despite this, convection began to increase once more, after Melissa moved into more favorable conditions. At this time, the storm also began to accelerate to the east-northeast, around the northern periphery of the Bermuda-Azores High. Just a few hours later, convection decreased for the final time as the inner-core region was taken over by stable cold-air stratocumulus clouds. By early on October 14, Melissa only remained an exposed swirl with decreased convection. After merging with a nearby frontal boundary, Melissa degenerated into an extratropical low at 12:00 UTC that day, while located roughly 400 miles (645 km) south of Cape Race, Newfoundland. Just 6 hours later, the circulation of the low opened up, and the system dissipated shortly afterwards.

== Preparations and impact ==
=== New England ===
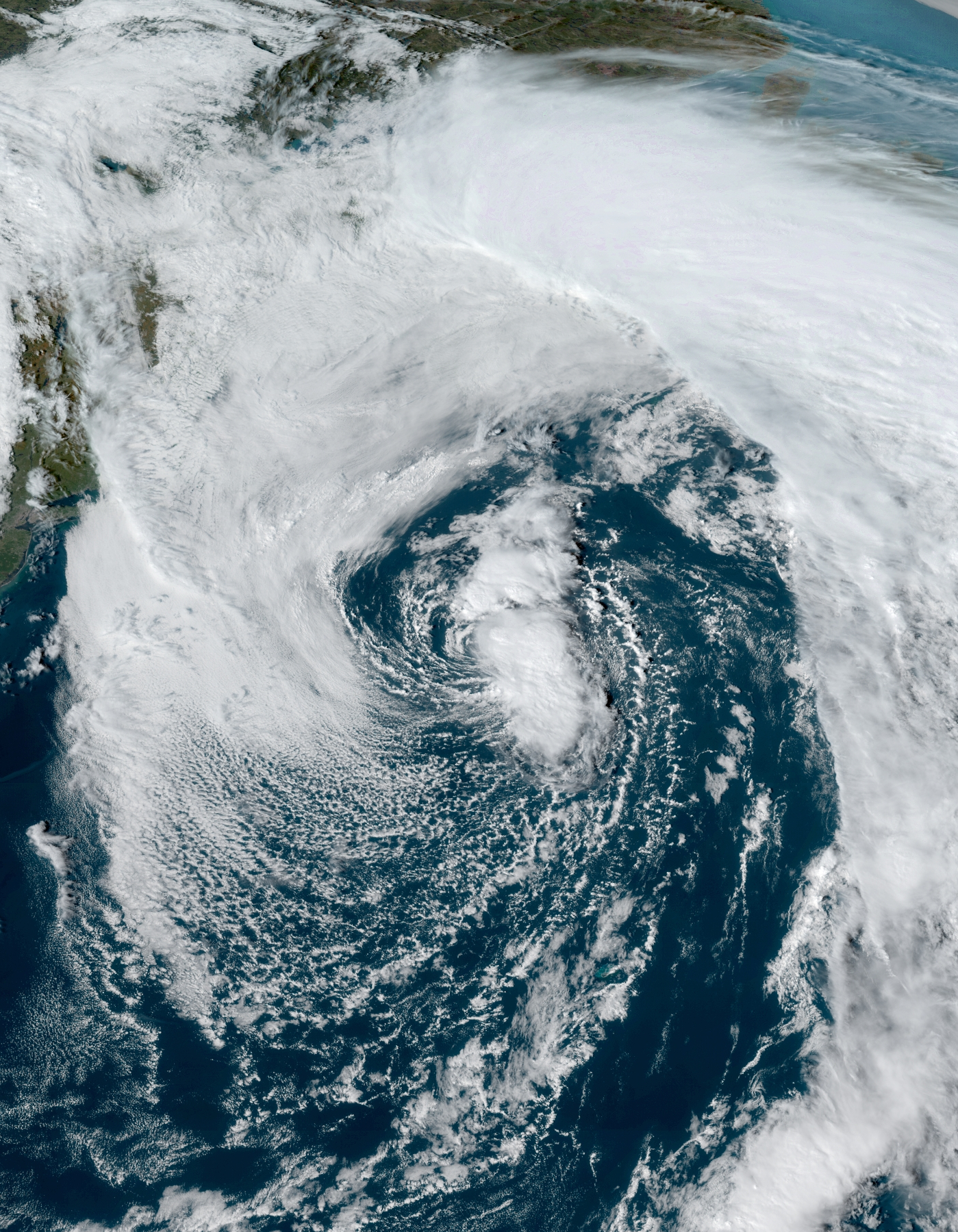
Melissa as a tropical storm over the open Atlantic on October 12

Melissa brought high winds and heavy rainfall to portions of Massachusetts. A peak sustained wind of 49 mph (80 km/h) and a peak gust of 66 mph (106 km/h) reported in Wellfleet. Meanwhile, a peak precipitation amount of 3.43 in (87 mm) was recorded in Nantucket. Strong wind in Bridgewater downed a tree, which snapped a telecommunication pole and took down power lines. A large tree fell on a house while also downing electrical wires in New Bedford. Trees were also downed in Wenham and Walpole. A large tree branch fell on a vehicle in Salem, fortunately causing little damage to the vehicle. Electrical wires were downed in Harwich. A tree fell on power lines in Eastham. A large tree and electrical lines were downed in Easton, and a similar scene was spotted in Fairhaven. In Nantucket, rough surf crashed against a road. Damage across the state was estimated at $23,100 (2019 USD).

In Rhode Island, a peak wind gust of 43 mph (69 km/h) was reported at the Block Island Jetty on Block Island. A large branch was downed in East Greenwich. In Middletown, amateur radio reported that a large tree had fallen. In southwestern Connecticut, moderate coastal flooding was report, reaching a height of up to 10.1 ft (3.08 m) in Stamford.

Total damage in New England reached $24,000 (2019 USD), with $900 in Rhode Island.

=== Elsewhere ===
Melissa brought widespread coastal flooding to Delaware, Maryland, New Jersey, and Virginia. In New Jersey, this coastal flooding shut down parts of the U.S. 30 and 40 highways, as well as New Jersey State Route 37. Coastal flooding on Long Beach Island prompted the cancellation of the first day of the LBI International Kite Festival. The highest tide since 2016 was reported in Reedville, Virginia. Road closures occurred due to coastal flooding in parts of Delaware and Maryland. In the former, large surf from the storm caused beach erosion and flooded streets in Bethany Beach while homes and streets were inundated by floodwaters in Dewey Beach. Large waves were also recorded in parts of coastal New York.

Melissa caused stormy weather in Nova Scotia between October 11–12. Wind gusts between 50–55 mph (80–90 km/h) were reported in the southwestern part of the province. Roughly 3,000 customers of Nova Scotia Power lost electricity. Strong winds forced a cruise ship to be diverted from Halifax to Sydney.

== See also ==
- Other storms with the same name
- Tropical cyclones in 2019
- 1991 Perfect Storm
- Hurricane Jose (2017)
- Tropical Storm Fay (2020)
- October 2021 nor'easter – A similar storm that also struck the Northeastern U.S., before becoming Tropical Storm Wanda
