= List of storms named Maud =

The name Maud has been used for two tropical cyclones worldwide.

In the Australian Region:

- Cyclone Maud (1973) – a Category 1 tropical cyclone existed offshore Western Australia.

In the South-West Indian Ocean:

- Cyclone Maud (1962) – a Category 1 tropical cyclone existed south of Diego Garcia and executed a loop at the end of its track.
