= List of storms named Mike =

The name Mike has been used for three tropical cyclones worldwide: one in the Atlantic Ocean, one in the Western Pacific Ocean and one in the Southern Pacific Ocean.

In the Atlantic:

- Tropical Storm Mike (1950) – was not officially recognized as a tropical storm until 2014.

In the West Pacific:

- Typhoon Mike (1990) (T9025, 27W, Ruping) – a Category 5-equivalent typhoon that made landfall in the Philippines, becoming the costliest tropical cyclone to affect the country at the time.

Mike was retired from future usage in the West Pacific after the 1990 season and replaced by Manny for subsequent seasons.

In the South Pacific:

- Cyclone Mike (2014) – affected the Cook Islands.

== See also ==
- List of storms named Ike – a similar name that has been used in two tropical cyclone basins
- List of storms named Michael – a similar name that has also been used in the Atlantic Ocean
- List of storms named Moke – a similar name that has been used in the Central Pacific Ocean
