= List of storms named Mindy =

The name Mindy has been used for two tropical cyclones in the Atlantic Ocean.

- Tropical Storm Mindy (2003), remained at sea, but caused minor damage in Puerto Rico.
- Tropical Storm Mindy (2021), made landfall in Florida, weakening to a tropical depression shortly after; the precursor disturbance triggered deadly flooding in Mexico, killing 23 people.
