= List of storms named Maury =

The name Maury has been used for three tropical cyclones in the West Pacific Ocean:

- Tropical Storm Maury (1981) – a severe tropical storm that caused 38 fatalities in Taiwan.
- Tropical Storm Maury (1984) – a severe tropical storm that was absorbed by Tropical Storm Nina in a Fujiwhara interaction.
- Tropical Storm Maury (1987) – killed 86 people in Vietnam.
