= List of storms named Mavis =

The name Mavis has been used for two tropical cyclones in the Australian region of the Southern Hemisphere:

- Cyclone Mavis (1965) – a tropical cyclone that minimal affected Western Australia.
- Cyclone Mavis (1971) – a Category 3 severe tropical cyclone that made landfall Western Australia causing flooding.
