= List of storms named Monty =

The name Monty has been used for three tropical cyclones in the Australian region of the Southern Hemisphere:

- Cyclone Monty (1983) – remained out to sea.
- Cyclone Monty (1993) – remained out to sea.
- Cyclone Monty (2004) – a powerful Category 4 tropical cyclone that made landfall Western Australia.

After the 2004 storm, the name Monty was retired. It was replaced with Mitchell for future seasons.
