= List of storms named Miding =

The name Miding was used for nine tropical cyclones by the Philippine Atmospheric, Geophysical and Astronomical Services Administration (PAGASA) and its predecessor, the Philippine Weather Bureau, in the Western Pacific Ocean.

- Tropical Depression Miding (1966) – a tropical depression which was only recognized by the Philippine Weather Bureau and the China Meteorological Administration (CMA).
- Tropical Depression Miding (1970) – a tropical depression that was only monitored by the Philippine Weather Bureau and the Japan Meteorological Agency (JMA).
- Tropical Storm Lucy (1974) (T7413, 14W, Miding) – a minimal tropical storm which brushed Taiwan and hit mainland China.
- Typhoon Elaine (1978) (T7814, 15W, Miding) – a typhoon that crossed northern Luzon Taiwan and hit Guangdong.
- Typhoon Dot (1982) (T8212, 13W, Miding) – a relatively long-lasting typhoon which struck Taiwan as a tropical storm.
- Typhoon Wayne (1986) (T8614, 12W, Miding) – another long-lived typhoon that had an extremely erratic track, severely affecting Taiwan, northern Philippines and southern China.
- Typhoon Ed (1990) (T9018, 19W, Miding) – a long-tracked typhoon which eventually brushed northern Luzon and caused severe damage in Vietnam.
- Typhoon Walt (1994) (T9407, 10W, Miding) – an intense Category 4-equivalent typhoon that paralleled the eastern seaboard of the Philippines before skirting through Japan and South Korea.
- Tropical Storm Elvis (1998) (T9814, 23W, Miding) – a weak tropical storm which devastated Vietnam, claiming 49 lives.
