= List of storms named Mamie =

The name Mamie has been used for ten tropical cyclones in the West Pacific Ocean:

- Typhoon Mamie (1953)
- Typhoon Mamie (1957)
- Typhoon Mamie (1960)
- Typhoon Mamie (1963)
- Typhoon Mamie (1968)
- Tropical Storm Mamie (1972)
- Tropical Storm Mamie (1975)
- Tropical Storm Mamie (1982)
- Typhoon Mamie (1985)
- Tropical Storm Mamie (1988)

== See also ==
Storms with similar names

- Typhoon Maemi (2003) – the most powerful typhoon on record to strike South Korea.
- Cyclone May (1998) – a Category 1 Australian region tropical cyclone that made landfall near Mornington Island.
