= List of storms named Martha =

The names Martha and Marta have been used for three tropical cyclones and one European windstorm worldwide.

In the Atlantic Ocean:

- Hurricane Martha (1969) – a rare Category 1 hurricane that made landfall in Panama

In the West Pacific Ocean:

- Typhoon Martha (1948) – a Category 3 typhoon that stayed at sea

In the Australian region:

- Tropical Storm Martha–Judith (1966) – crossed into the South-West Indian Ocean

In Europe:

- Storm Marta (2026) – caused widespread flooding and damaged crops in Portugal and Spain
