= List of storms named Margot =

The name Margot has been used for two tropical cyclones worldwide.

In the Atlantic Ocean:

- Hurricane Margot (2023) – a Category 1 hurricane that stayed in the open ocean

In the Australian region:

- Cyclone Margot (1985) – Category 3 tropical cyclone that stayed at sea
