= List of storms named Marian =

The name Marian has been used for four tropical cyclones worldwide: two in the West Pacific Ocean and two in the Australian region.

In the West Pacific:

- Typhoon Marian (1990; T9003, 03W) – a Category 2-equivalent typhoon that significantly impacted Taiwan's agricultural industry.
- Tropical Storm Marian (1993; T9310, 09W, Ibiang) – did not affect land.

In the Australian region:

- Cyclone Marian (1991) – a Category 4 severe tropical cyclone.
- Cyclone Marian (2021) – a Category 4 severe tropical cyclone that briefly entered the South-West Indian Ocean.

== See also ==
- Cyclone Marion (1977) – a South Pacific tropical cyclone with a similar name.
