= List of storms named Marcia =

The name Marcia has been used for four tropical cyclones in the Southern Hemisphere.

- Tropical Cyclone Marcia (1974), did not affect land
- Tropical Cyclone Marcia (1989), did not affect land
- Tropical Cyclone Marcia (2000), did not affect land
- Cyclone Marcia (2015), one of the most intense tropical cyclones making landfall over Queensland, Australia
