= List of storms named Mark =

The name Mark has been used for four tropical cyclones worldwide: two in the West Pacific Ocean, one in the Australian region, and one in the South Pacific Ocean.

In the West Pacific:

- Tropical Storm Mark (1992) (1992; T9213, 13W) – a weak tropical storm; one person was killed and another reported missing.
- Typhoon Mark (1995; T9510, 14W) – a Category 2-equivalent typhoon that did not affect land.

In the Australian region:

- Cyclone Mark (1992) – a Category 2 tropical cyclone.

In the South Pacific:

- Cyclone Mark (1983) – a Category 3 severe tropical cyclone that took an erratic and unusual track; affected Fiji and Vanuatu.

The name Mark was retired in the South Pacific after the 1982–83 season.
