= List of storms named Maymay =

The name Maymay has been used for three tropical cyclones in the Philippine Area of Responsibility in the West Pacific Ocean, replacing Mario on the naming lists:

- Typhoon Jebi (2018) (T1821, 25W, Maymay) – a Category 5 typhoon that affected Japan, becoming its costliest typhoon in terms of insured losses
- Tropical Depression Maymay (2022) – a short-lived depression that stayed offshore the Philippines; only acknowledged by the JMA and PAGASA
- Tropical Storm Kujira (2026) (T2614, 13W, Luis-Maymay) — weak tropical storm that made landfall in the Philippines

== See also ==
- Cyclone May (1998) – an Australian region tropical cyclone with a similar name

Preceded by Luis	Pacific typhoon season names Maymay	Succeeded by Neneng
