= Typhoon Mary (1960) =

Pacific typhoon in 1960

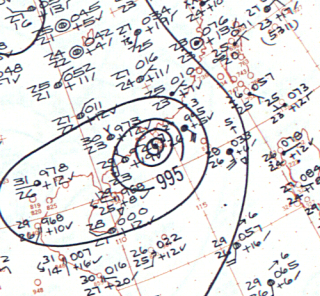
- Surface weather analysis of Typhoon Mary near peak intensity

Meteorological history
- Formed: 2 June 1960
- Extratropical: 12 June 1960
- Dissipated: 18 June 1960

Category 1-equivalent typhoon
- 1-minute sustained (SSHWS/JTWC)
- Highest winds: 150 km/h (90 mph)
- Highest gusts: 195 km/h (120 mph)
- Lowest pressure: 975 hPa (mbar); 28.79 inHg

Overall effects
- Fatalities: ≥1,649 confirmed
- Missing: 11
- Areas affected: British Hong Kong; Portuguese Macau; China; Taiwan; Okinawa
- IBTrACS
- Part of the 1960 Pacific typhoon season

Typhoon Mary, also nicknamed "Bloody Mary" by the Joint Typhoon Warning Center (JTWC), was an extremely damaging storm that was part of the 1960 Pacific typhoon season. It began as a circulation in a trough in the South China Sea. A tropical depression formed on June 2, as it was traveling clockwise. It became a tropical storm on the next day, and received the name Mary. It slowly moved across the sea, strengthening to a typhoon. Mary made landfall in Hong Kong on June 8, and moved through Guangdong and Fujian. It reemerged back to the Pacific Ocean, and restrengthened into a typhoon temporarily. It then traveled east, weakening and becoming extratropical on June 12.

Mary caused a significant amount of damage in Hong Kong and China. It was considered the worst storm to hit Hong Kong since the typhoon in 1937. The storm destroyed weak shacks made by refugees from the mainland, leaving thousands homeless. There were multiple landslides, and most of the infrastructure were damaged. More than 400 small watercraft were either damaged or destroyed. In China, dikes and dams were damaged severely, multiple public buildings collapsed, and destroyed large swaths of farmland. Significant wind and rain was also reported in Taiwan. More than 1,600 people died during the storm.

== Meteorological history ==
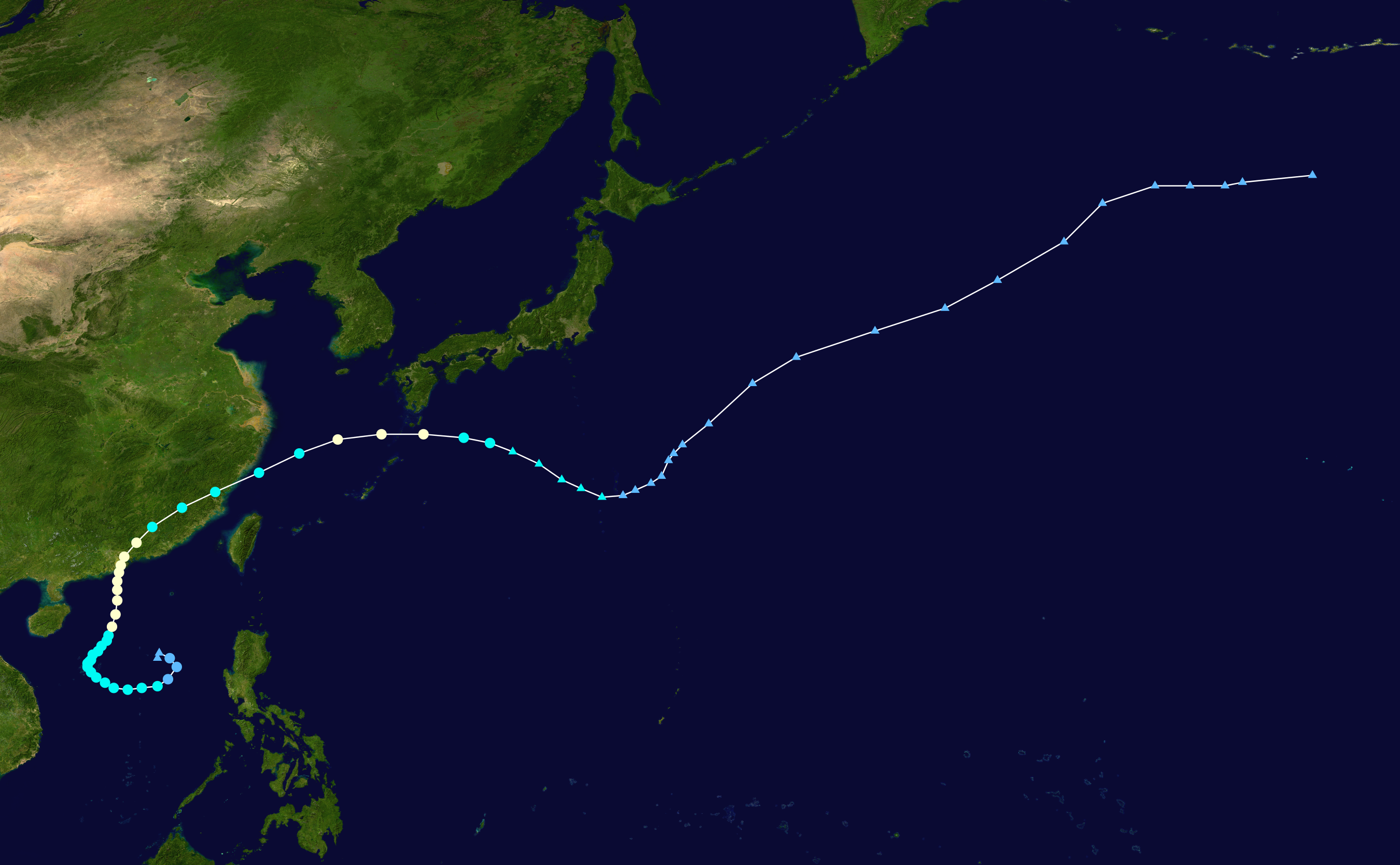
Map plotting the storm's track and intensity, according to the Saffir–Simpson scale Map key Saffir–Simpson scale Tropical depression (≤38 mph, ≤62 km/h) Tropical storm (39–73 mph, 63–118 km/h) Category 1 (74–95 mph, 119–153 km/h) Category 2 (96–110 mph, 154–177 km/h) Category 3 (111–129 mph, 178–208 km/h) Category 4 (130–156 mph, 209–251 km/h) Category 5 (≥157 mph, ≥252 km/h) Unknown Storm type Tropical cyclone Subtropical cyclone Extratropical cyclone, remnant low, tropical disturbance, or monsoon depression

In early June, a trough extended from Taiwan to the South China Sea, and a small circulation was found at the southwestern part of it. The Japan Meteorological Agency (JMA) designated the system as a tropical depression on June 2, with a pressure reading of 1,000 hectopascals (30 inHg). (Note: The Japan Meteorological Agency is the official Regional Specialized Meteorological Center for the western Pacific Ocean.) JTWC reported it had winds of 55 km/h (35 mph) during that time. On the next day at 1200 UTC, JTWC began tracking the storm as a tropical depression. The system was upgraded to a tropical storm at 1800 UTC, with winds of 65 km/h (40 mph), and was given the name Mary by the warning center. By 1800 UTC of June 4, Mary slowly began turning northward near the Paracel Islands, and had intensified slightly to 75 km/h (45 mph).

On June 5, JMA recorded Mary's lowest pressure reading at 980 hPa (29 inHg). Two days later, the storm had intensified to 110 km/h (70 mph), and was traveling faster towards Hong Kong. On June 7, at 0600 UTC, Mary quickly strengthened to a typhoon, with winds up to 130 km/h (80 mph). Mary peaked at 0600 UTC on June 8, just offshore of Hong Kong, with winds of 150 km/h (90 mph), and JTWC estimated the pressure was 975 hPa (28.8 inHg). Twelve hours later, the storm made landfall on Hong Kong northwest of Kowloon. Inland, the typhoon slowly weakened to 90 km/h (55 mph) by June 10, back to a tropical storm. The system gained speed as it traveled through Guangdong and Fujian provinces. Mary soon reemerged back to the ocean later than day, began restrengthening, and was found to have 110 km/h (70 mph) winds, recorded by the U.S. Navy. The storm briefly became a typhoon at 1800 UTC, and reconnaissance aircraft recorded winds just above typhoon strength, although the circulation did not have eyewalls. It was downgraded to a tropical storm on June 11 at 1200 UTC.

Another reconnaissance aircraft flew into Mary again at 2330 UTC, reporting that there was no eyewall in the storm and recorded winds up to 65 km/h (40 mph). Mary continued to weaken until June 12, when JTWC and JMA declared the storm had become extratropical southeast of Tokyo. JMA continued to track the extratropical cyclone until it reached the International Date Line on June 18.

== Preparations, impact and aftermath ==
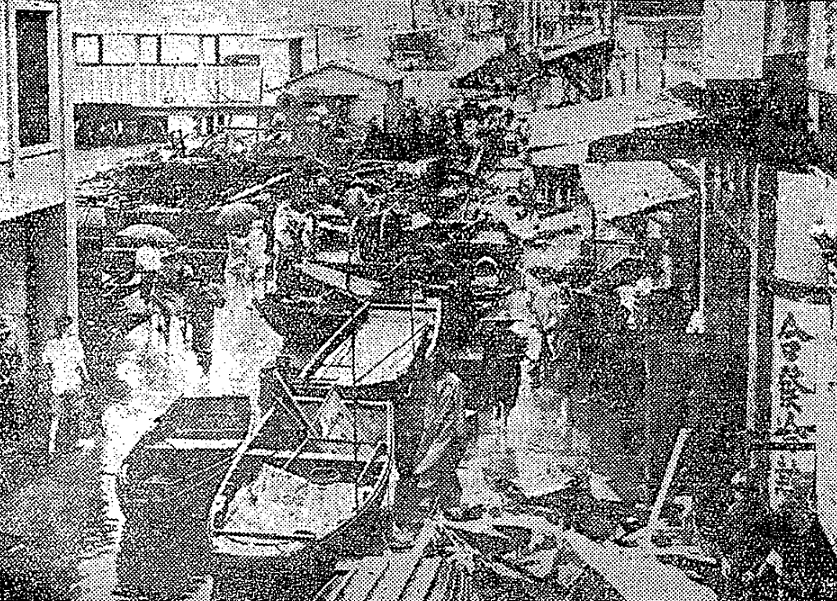
Front page of Ta Kung Pao, showing the damage inside the colony

Before Mary made landfall, 80 freighters and liners arrived in Hong Kong to ride out the storm. In Okinawa, military personnel were evacuated to safe areas, and planes were all protected. Meanwhile, a joint military exercise by the South Korean and American Marines were delayed by one day due to the storm.

=== Hong Kong ===
Typhoon Mary was considered the worst storm to hit Hong Kong in 23 years. The typhoon arrived at the colony on June 8, dropping 35.9 centimetres (14.12 in) of rain in 24 hours. Average gusts were reported at 119 kilometres per hour (64 kn) on Waglan Island, with 194 kilometres per hour (105 kn) at times. At the Royal Observatory, the storm dropped 42.7 cm (16.83 in) of rain. The mean winds blew southwesterly at 87 km/h (47 kn), exposing many small boats and villages. The No. 10 warning signal was issued by the Royal Observatory. However, according to the report written by the Observatory, the use of No. 10 warning signal was not strictly justified according to international procedures, since sustained surface winds of 119 km/h (64 kn) were not observed. Across the colony, damage to roads, buildings, and communication were significant. Landslides, and other fallen debris blocked roads, and weak refugee shacks in the hills, made out of tin and tar paper, quickly collapsed. All stores and public transportation were shut down inside the city. The Customs reported that more than 50 fishing vessels capsized and sank in the anchorages during the typhoon. Two ocean freighters, the Malaya Fir and the Wan Fu, ran aground onto the Kai Tak Airstrip. Although the floods have caused extreme damage, it helped with the local shortage of water, with reservoirs gaining eleven million kilolitres (3,000,000,000 US gal) of water.

After the storm, 18,000 refugees from mainland China became homeless. The official count was 45 casualties, 11 missing, and 127 injured, with most casualties coming from refugees. Overall, 462 small watercraft were damaged or destroyed.

=== Elsewhere ===
In mainland China, the typhoon brought heavy rain and wind into the provinces of Guangdong and Fujian. Dikes and dams were severely damaged by the storm, leading to severe flooding. Thousands of people were trying to reinforce these as the floodwaters continued to rise. Manpower was also used to gather ripened crops before the storm destroyed them. More than 4,800 buildings were damaged, and over 540,000 hectares (1,330,000 acres) of land was affected by the storm. The total number of casualties was reportedly 1,600; and 180,000 cattle were reported killed.

Macau received a similar amount of rain as Hong Kong, which caused local flooding. The winds uprooted trees, blocking local streets.

About 260 kilometres (160 mi) southeast of Hong Kong, the cargo ship Sheng Lee sank during the typhoon. Fifty-four survivors were rescued and safely transported to the British colony by the Royal Navy frigate HMS Torquay, with help from Dutch ships, and the Republic of China Navy and Air Force.

Off the coast of mainland China, in the Matsu Islands, many fishing boats were damaged by the heavy seas and the torrential rainfall. Three people were injured in the islands. In Taiwan, downtown Taipei received significant flooding, and some rice crops on the south part of the island were damaged. Although there were no reported deaths on the island, four fisherman offshore died. The nearby Okinawa Islands received winds around 105 kilometres per hour (65 mph).
