= List of storms named Meranti =

The name Meranti (Malay: meranti, [məranti]) has been used for three tropical cyclones in the Western Pacific Ocean. The name was contributed by Malaysia and refers to trees of the genus Shorea in Malay.

- Typhoon Meranti (2004) (T0412, 14W) – a typhoon which stayed at sea throughout its lifetime, and also the first of a record nine named storms to form in August during the 2004 season.
- Severe Tropical Storm Meranti (2010) (T1010, 11W) – a short-lived tropical storm which was upgraded by JMA to a severe tropical storm in post-analysis; peaked as a Category 1-equivalent tropical cyclone before making landfall in Fujian, China.
- Typhoon Meranti (2016) (T1614, 16W, Ferdie) – an extremely powerful typhoon that made landfall in Itbayat, the Philippines near peak intensity and struck Taiwan and China afterwards, causing at least $4.7 billion worth of damage.

The name Meranti was retired following the 2016 Pacific typhoon season and was replaced with Nyatoh (Malay: nyatoh, [ɲatoh]), which refers to trees of the genera Palaquium and Payena in Malay.
