= List of storms named Melissa =

The name Melissa was used for five tropical cyclones worldwide: four in the Atlantic Ocean and one in the Western Pacific Ocean.

In the Atlantic, where it replaced Michelle after the 2001 season:

- Tropical Storm Melissa (2007) – short-lived storm west of Cape Verde, never threatened land
- Tropical Storm Melissa (2013) – short-lived storm in the central Atlantic, never threatened land
- Tropical Storm Melissa (2019) – short-lived storm that formed in the central Atlantic
- Hurricane Melissa (2025) – long-lived and extremely powerful Category 5 hurricane that made a catastrophic landfall in Jamaica near peak intensity, and again in Cuba at Category 3 strength; tied as strongest Atlantic hurricane by sustained winds.

Following the 2025 hurricane, the name Melissa was retired from the rotating naming list, and will not again be used for an Atlantic hurricane. It was replaced with Molly for the 2031 season.

In the Western Pacific:

- Typhoon Melissa (1994) (T9424, 26W) – remained over open waters
