= List of storms named Mario =

The name Mario has been used for two tropical cyclones in the Eastern Pacific Ocean and one in the Philippines by the PAGASA in the Western Pacific Ocean.

In the Eastern Pacific:

- Tropical Storm Mario (2019), approached Baja California but dissipated before affecting land
- Tropical Storm Mario (2025), affected Western Mexico and the Southwestern United States without making landfall

In the Western Pacific:

- Tropical Storm Fung-wong (2014) (T1416, 16W, Mario) - brushed the Northern Philippines, where it caused over ₱1 billion in damages; later landfall on Shanghai, China.

The name Mario was retired by PAGASA following the 2014 typhoon season and replaced with Maymay for the 2018 season.
