= Bulbophyllum sect. Pachychlamys =

Scientific classification
- Kingdom: Plantae
- Clade: Tracheophytes
- Clade: Angiosperms
- Clade: Monocots
- Order: Asparagales
- Family: Orchidaceae
- Subfamily: Epidendroideae
- Genus: Bulbophyllum
- Section: Bulbophyllum sect. Pachychlamys; Schltr. 1925

Type species
- Bulbophyllum pachypus

Species
- See text

Section of flowering plants

Bulbophyllum sect. Pachychlamys is a section of the genus Bulbophyllum.

== Description ==
Species in this section have creeping rhizomes and a two leaf pseudobulb with a rachis with multiple flowers.

== Distribution ==
Plants from this section are found in Madagascar.

== Species ==
Bulbophyllum section Pachychlamys comprises the following species:

Image	Name	Distribution	Elevation (m)
	Bulbophyllum longivaginans H.Perrier 1937	Madagascar	1,000 metres (3,300 ft)
	Bulbophyllum molossus Rchb. f. 1888	Madagascar	700–1,500 metres (2,300–4,900 ft)
	Bulbophyllum multivaginatum Jum. & Perrier 1912	Madagascar	1,000 metres (3,300 ft)
	Bulbophyllum pachypus Schltr. 1925	Madagascar	800–1,400 metres (2,600–4,600 ft)
	Bulbophyllum perrieri Schltr. 1913	Madagascar	1,500–1,600 metres (4,900–5,200 ft)
	Bulbophyllum sandrangatense Bosser 1965	Madagascar	900–1,200 metres (3,000–3,900 ft)
	Bulbophyllum septatum Schltr. 1924	Madagascar	1,000–2,000 metres (3,300–6,600 ft)
	Bulbophyllum vestitum Bosser 1971	Madagascar	500–1,100 metres (1,600–3,600 ft)
