= Cyclone Gretelle =

South-West Indian tropical cyclone 1997

Tropical Cyclone Gretelle
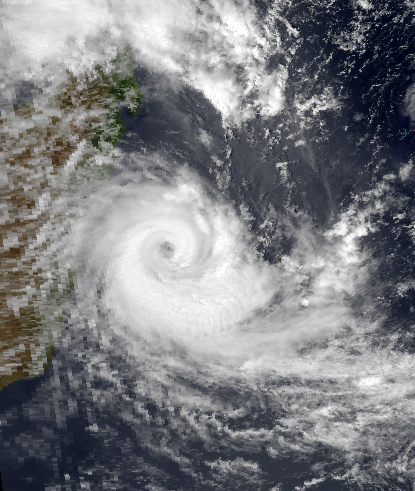
- Satellite image of Cyclone Gretelle nearing Madagascar on 23 January

Meteorological history
- Formed: 19 January 1997
- Dissipated: 31 January 1997

Tropical cyclone
- 10-minute sustained (MFR)
- Highest winds: 140 km/h (85 mph)
- Lowest pressure: 950 hPa (mbar); 28.05 inHg

Category 4-equivalent tropical cyclone
- 1-minute sustained (SSHWS/JTWC)
- Highest winds: 215 km/h (130 mph)

Overall effects
- Fatalities: 152 total
- Damage: $50.1 million (1997 USD)
- Areas affected: Réunion, Madagascar, Mozambique
- IBTrACS
- Part of the 1996–97 South-West Indian Ocean cyclone season

Tropical Cyclone Gretelle was a deadly storm that struck southeastern Madagascar in January 1997. The seventh named storm of the 1996–97 South-West Indian Ocean cyclone season, Gretelle developed within the Intertropical Convergence Zone on 19 January, and gradually intensified while moving southwestward. On 22 January, the storm intensified to tropical cyclone status while passing northwest of Réunion; there, Gretelle produced strong wind gusts and heavy rainfall in mountainous regions. Subsequently, the cyclone strengthened to reach peak 10-minute sustained winds of 140 km/h (85 mph). On 24 January, Gretelle made landfall near Farafangana, the first in the region in 41 years. The cyclone weakened while crossing Madagascar, but restrengthened slightly in the Mozambique Channel. Gretelle meandered off the coast of Mozambique, bringing gusty winds that downed trees, but caused little damage in the country. An approaching trough turned the cyclone to the southeast, and Gretelle dissipated on 31 January to the south-southwest of Madagascar.

Damage from Cyclone Gretelle was heaviest near where it made landfall in Madagascar. In several villages, over 90% of the buildings were destroyed, leaving about 80,000 people homeless. Wind gusts at Farafangana reached 220 km/h (140 mph), which knocked trees onto roads and wrecked about 138,000 tons of crops. Heavy rainfall and high waves flooded coastal regions, in some areas up to 16 m (52 ft) deep. Overall damage was estimated at around $50 million (Note: All damage totals are in 1997 United States dollars unless otherwise noted.), and there were 152 deaths. After the storm, there was a coordinated international relief effort to provide food and money to Madagascar.

== Meteorological history ==
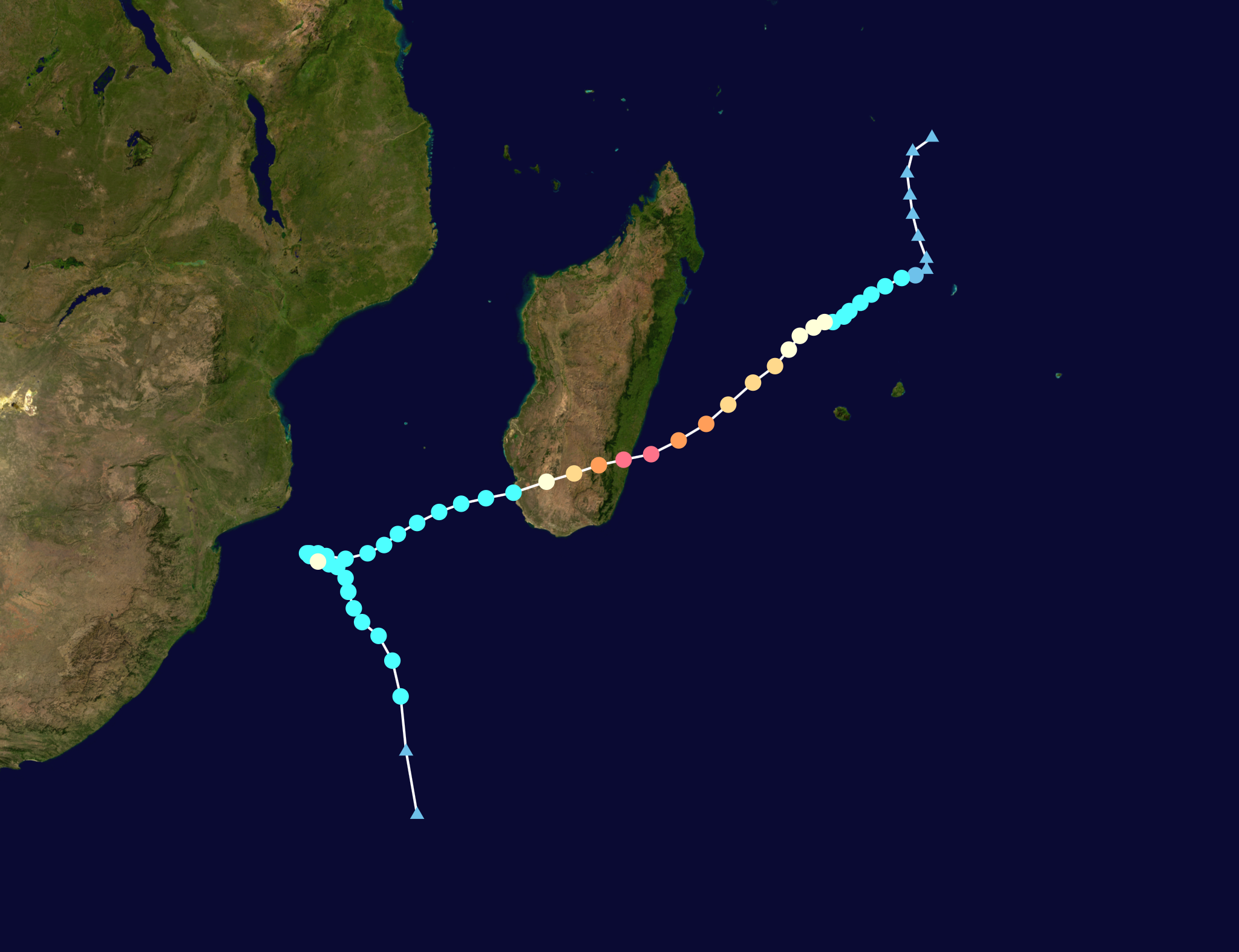
Map plotting the storm's track and intensity, according to the Saffir–Simpson scale Map key Saffir–Simpson scale Tropical depression (≤38 mph, ≤62 km/h) Tropical storm (39–73 mph, 63–118 km/h) Category 1 (74–95 mph, 119–153 km/h) Category 2 (96–110 mph, 154–177 km/h) Category 3 (111–129 mph, 178–208 km/h) Category 4 (130–156 mph, 209–251 km/h) Category 5 (≥157 mph, ≥252 km/h) Unknown Storm type Tropical cyclone Subtropical cyclone Extratropical cyclone, remnant low, tropical disturbance, or monsoon depression

The Intertropical Convergence Zone spawned a tropical disturbance on 19 January, developing a circulation just west of St. Brandon. That day, the Météo-France on Réunion (MFR) classified the system as a tropical disturbance, (Note: Météo-France is the official Regional Specialized Meteorological Center for the south-west Indian Ocean, based out of Réunion.) and the Joint Typhoon Warning Center (JTWC) (Note: The Joint Typhoon Warning Center is a joint United States Navy – United States Air Force task force that issues tropical cyclone warnings for the region.) began monitoring the system as a low-pressure area a day prior. The system intensified into Tropical Storm Gretelle late on 20 January, by which time the JTWC gave it the designation Tropical Cyclone 20S. Due to a large ridge centered near Île Amsterdam, the storm tracked generally southwestward toward the Mascarene Islands. Early on 22 January, the JTWC upgraded the storm to the equivalent of a minimal hurricane, and later that day, the MFR upgraded Gretelle to tropical cyclone status, or with 10-minute sustained winds of at least 120 km/h (75 mph).

Shortly after attaining tropical cyclone status, Gretelle made its closest point of approach to Réunion late on 22 January, passing about 300 km (190 mi) northwest of the island. Subsequently, the cyclone developed a small eye, and the MFR estimated peak 10-minute winds of 140 km/h (85 mph) at 0000 UTC on 23 January. Meanwhile, the JTWC estimated Gretelle continued to intensify to a 1-minute sustained wind peak of 215 km/h (135 mph) at 0600 UTC on 24 January, equivalent to a Category 4 hurricane on the Saffir–Simpson scale. Later that day, the cyclone made landfall on southeastern Madagascar near Farafangana near peak intensity. Reports from the United Nations Department of Humanitarian Affairs considered Gretelle the first cyclone to strike the region in 41 years. Gretelle rapidly weakened over land, emerging into the Mozambique Channel as a tropical depression on 25 January. Continuing to the southwest, the depression re-intensified into a tropical storm on 27 January.

After becoming a tropical storm again, Gretelle slowed in the Mozambique Channel. A cold front bypassed the storm to the south, and a building ridge behind it turned Gretelle to a west-northwest drift. Although it approached southeastern Africa on 28 January, an advancing trough turned the storm to the southeast. The next day, the JTWC briefly re-upgraded Gretelle to the equivalent of a minimal hurricane, and on 30 January, the MFO estimated a secondary 10-minute wind peak of 85 km/h (55 mph). Accelerating to the south-southeast, Gretelle dissipated on 31 January well to the south-southwest of Madagascar.

== Impact ==
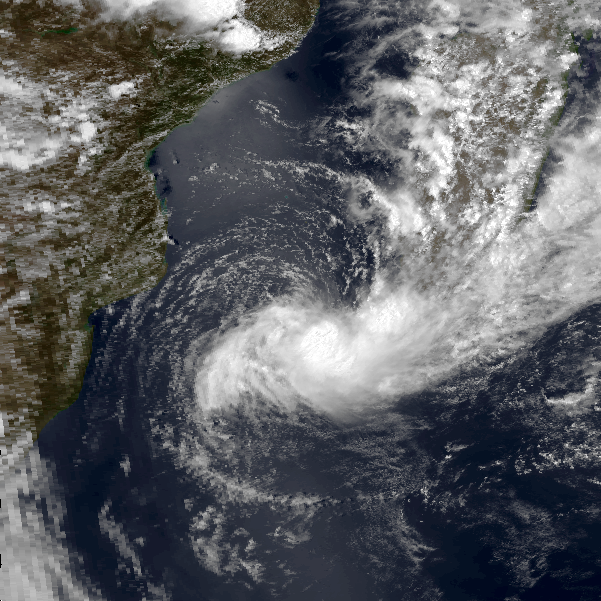
Satellite image of Gretelle in the Mozambique Channel

While passing north of Réunion, Gretelle dropped heavy rainfall in the eastern and western portions of the island. Over 48 hours, rainfall totaled nearly 1 m (3.3 ft) at Commerson Crater, while Mafate recorded over 600 mm (24 in). Gretelle produced gusts of about 100 km/h (62 mph) in portions of Réunion. Late in its duration, the cyclone produced heavy rainfall but left minimal damage in Mozambique, estimated at $50,000. Winds of over 55 km/h (34 km/h) knocked over trees and caused power outages in Gaza and Maputo provinces. Officials in South Africa issued rain and wind warnings for the northeast coast.

In Madagascar, Gretelle produced wind gusts of over 200 km/h (120 mph) at Vangaindrano near where it moved ashore, and over 220 km/h (140 mph) at Farafangana. The storm also dropped heavy rainfall, although peak totals were unknown due to the meteorological station in Farafangana being destroyed. Heavy rainfall and high waves left heavy damage near the coast, washing away several boats and causing rivers to overflow. Floods in some areas reached 16 m (52 ft) deep. Where Gretelle made landfall, most buildings were damaged or destroyed excluding those made of concrete, leaving about 80,000 people homeless. Among the wrecked buildings included a hospital and a prison. About 95% of homes in Vondrozo were wrecked, and in Farafangana, 90% of government buildings were destroyed. In both southern Midongy and Vangaindrano, nearly every building was destroyed. Gretelle damaged or destroyed 1,538 homes in Manakara.

Reports from the Red Cross indicated that Gretelle was the severest in the region "in living memory", with many people surviving the high tides and winds by "clinging to trees". The storm also damaged water stations, power lines, and thousands of hectares of crops, including food reserves. The World Food Programme estimated that Gretelle destroyed 7,000 tons of rice, 123,500 tons of cassava, and 8,000 tons of cash crops, mostly to coffee. About 40,000 people were isolated for weeks after the storm in Befotaka and Midongy Sud, with many roads blocked by fallen trees. Overall, about 200 people were killed or left missing in Madagascar, with 152 confirmed fatalities by two weeks after the storm, 82 of whom in Vangaindrano. The International Disaster Database later listed 140 as the total fatalities related to Gretelle. Damage from the storm was estimated at $50 million.

== Aftermath ==
After heavy damage from Cyclone Bonita in 1996, the government of Madagascar initiated a disaster response system that was used during Gretelle; there was quick response but efforts were hampered by damaged infrastructure and disrupted transportation. The storm had cut communications in some areas, but by 29 January, or five days after landfall, telephone service was restored to Manakara. Following the storm, the Madagascar government coordinated the distribution of emergency rice rations and other relief items. On 27 January, the government launched a fundraiser on television that raised over ₣130 million (FMG, US$30,000). The southern portion of the country was declared a disaster area. A plane of relief supplies flew from the capital Antananarivo to Manakara along the southeast coast, where trucks distributed the items to the affected areas. A radio station based out of the country criticized the slow pace of relief, citing the lack of available boats after many were destroyed. In addition, there were reports that government aid was being stolen by looters.

In the weeks after the storm, the hardest hit residents faced food shortages and lacked access to clean water, in an area already facing ongoing food shortages. In response, the World Food Programme and other agencies of the United Nations created a program to feed about 350,000 people in the region over three months, providing about 5,900 tons of food. In the months after the storm, roads were repaired, including the link from Vangaindrano to Midongy. Farmers grew additional beans and potatoes to compensate for the damaged crops, while the quick distribution of food prevented significant malnutrition. In the subsequent years, about 40% of the forest at Manombo that regrew following Gretelle was of foreign nature, which threatened the original plants in the region.

Due to the scale of the cyclone damage, the government issued an international appeal for assistance. As a result, the United Nations Department of Humanitarian Affairs provided a grant of $30,000. UNICEF provided about $48,000 to secure drug kits for children impacted by the cyclone. The Red Cross of Seychelles donated about one tonne of clothing and 20 tonnes of tuna, and the Red Cross of Réunion sent drugs to Madagascar. The government of France also sent a crew from Réunion to Madagascar to assist in the aftermath, as well as a plane to airdrop the aid. The governments of Germany, Japan, France, the United Kingdom each donated about $100,000 to Madagascar, while the United States provided about $25,000 and 500 tons of food. The government of Japan also sent 2,040 blankets and 10 tents. By 18 February, the total contributions by the international community reached about $3 million.
