= Befotaka Sud District =

- Location in Madagascar
- Coordinates: 23°49′30″S 46°58′44″E
- Country: Madagascar
- Region: Atsimo-Atsinanana

Area
  - Total: 3,780 km^{2} (1,460 sq mi)
- Elevation: 779 m (2,556 ft)

Population (2020)estimated
  - Total: 57,750
  - Density: 15.3/km^{2} (39.6/sq mi)
- Time zone: UTC3 (EAT)
- Postal code: 307

Befokata Sud is a district in the region of Atsimo-Atsinanana in Madagascar. The district has an estimated population in 2020 was 57,750.

== Communes ==
The district is further divided into seven communes:

- Befotaka
- Antaninarenina
- Antondabe (or Antondambe)
- Beharena
- Befotaka Atsimo
- Marovitsika Atsimo
- Ranotsara Atsimo

== Nature ==
It is the gateway to the Midongy Atsimo National Park (also called: Midongy-Betroka National Park) that is found in a distance of 34 km from Befotaka.

== Mining ==
There are celestite crystals found in this district.
