= Zara Maliorano =

Zara Zaraha (former name: Maliorano)
- Commune
- Location in Madagascar
- Coordinates: 23°18′S 47°03′E
- Country: Madagascar
- Region: Atsimo-Atsinanana
- District: Midongy-Atsimo
- Elevation: 565 m (1,854 ft)
- Time zone: UTC3 (EAT)
- Postal code: 318

Zara, sometimes also called Zaraha (former name is: Maliorano) is a town and commune in Madagascar. It belongs to the district of Midongy-Atsimo, which is a part of Atsimo-Atsinanana Region. There are 1851 inscribed voters in this commune.

To this commune belong also the villages of:

- Ambodisahy
- Ankalatany
- Beharena
- Bevaho
- Mahabe, Zara
- Marovovo
- Mikaiky
- Sahanety
- Tsararano, Zara
