= Soakibany =

- Location in Madagascar
- Coordinates: 22°55′S 47°06′E
- Country: Madagascar
- Region: Atsimo-Atsinanana
- District: Midongy-Atsimo
- Elevation: 503 m (1,650 ft)
- Time zone: UTC3 (EAT)
- Postal code: 318

Soakibany is a town and commune in Madagascar. It belongs to the district of Midongy-Atsimo, which is a part of Atsimo-Atsinanana Region. There are 1251 inscribed voters in this commune.

To this commune belong also the villages of:

- Amboangy
- Anezandava est
- Antaramiery
- Bearaotra
- Fasikendry
- Mahasoa, Soakibany
- Manatatoa Atsimo
