= Antondabe =

Antondabe Antondambe
- Location in Madagascar
- Coordinates: 23.829°S 47.093°E
- Country: Madagascar
- Region: Atsimo-Atsinanana
- District: Befotaka Sud District
- Time zone: UTC3 (EAT)
- Postal code: 307

Antondabe is a town in Atsimo-Atsinanana region in southeastern Madagascar. There is a steep cliff overlooking the town.
