= Bekofafa Sud =

Bekofafa Sud Bekofafa Atsimo
- Location in Madagascar
- Coordinates: 23°45′04″S 46°34′54″E
- Country: Madagascar
- Region: Atsimo-Atsinanana
- District: Befotaka Sud District
- Established: 1995
- Time zone: UTC3 (EAT)
- Postal code: 307

Bekofafa Sud (or in Malagasy: Bekofafa Atsimo) is a rural municipality in Atsimo-Atsinanana Region in south-eastern Madagascar.

The unpaved National road T 18 passes by this municipality.
