= Ivondro =

Ivondro Lavaraty
- Location in Madagascar
- Coordinates: 22°55′S 47°06′E
- Country: Madagascar
- Region: Atsimo-Atsinanana
- District: Midongy-Atsimo
- Time zone: UTC3 (EAT)
- Postal code: 318

Ivondro (former name: Lavaraty) is a town and commune in Madagascar. It belongs to the district of Midongy-Atsimo, which is a part of Atsimo-Atsinanana Region. There are 2054 inscribed voters in this commune.

To this commune belong also the villages of:

- Ampasy
- Analaiva, Ivondro
- Ankarindro
- Benonoka
- Lavaraty
- Mahazoarivo
- Makojano
- Sahatsoro
