= Midongy du sud National Park =

National park in Madagascar

- IUCN category II (national park)
- Location within Madagascar
- Location: Midongy-Atsimo District
- Nearest city: Farafangana, Befotaka
- Coordinates: 23°30′S 46°55′E
- Area: 1,922 km^{2} (742 sq mi)
- Established: 1997
- Governing body: Madagascar National Parks Association
- Website: www.parcs-madagascar.com/aire-prot%C3%A9g%C3%A9e/parc-national-midongy-du-sud

Midongy du sud National Park (also known as Midongy-Befotaka) is a national park in the region of Atsimo-Atsinanana, in south-east Madagascar. The 192,000 hectares (470,000 acres) park has the second largest rainforest on the island and is rich in endemic animals and plants, especially medicinal plants.

== History ==
Midongy first received protection in 1953 and became a national park in 1997.

== Geography ==
The park is also an Important Bird Area overlapping with the national park and is divided into two main parts; the Befotaka Forest 43,423 hectares (107,300 acres) and the Soarano Forest 24,145 hectares (59,660 acres). It is 42 kilometres (26 mi) from Befotaka and 90 kilometres (56 mi) south-east of Vangaindrano. It is served by unpaved roads which may be impassable during the wet season of December to June. There are deep valleys with humid rain forests and steep mountains and altitude, within the park, ranges from 689 metres (2,260 ft) to the summit of Mont Papango at 1,679 metres (5,509 ft). Many streams drain the mountains to feed marshes in the lowlands. Due to the rugged topography and the humid climate, Madagascar's second largest rain forest is within the park. Mean annual rainfall is from 1,600 millimetres (63 in) to 3,600 millimetres (140 in).

Ethnic groups living here are the Antaisaka people and the Bara people.

== Flora and fauna ==
Midongy du sud is rich in endemic plants, especially medical plants. 348 species live in the park of which 250 are only known to Madagascar. They include Mystroxylon aethiopicum, a member of the Celastraceae which is said to help with injuries, and the sap of Medinilla sp, is used for coughs. There are fourteen endangered plants which are listed in the International Union for Conservation of Nature (IUCN) red list for endangered species, and the orchids, Aeranthes caudata and Bulbophyllum vestitum are listed by the Convention on International Trade in Endangered Species of Wild Fauna and Flora (CITES) on Appendix II. The main tree species within the forest are Brachylaena, Calophyllum, Cryptocarya, Dalbergia, Diospyros, Elaeocarpus, Eugenia, Ocotea, Ravensara, Symphonia Tambourissa and Uapaca species. Marsh vegetation includes the screw-pine (Pandanus) and species of sedge (Carex).

4 species of lemurs are found in the park, including the most endangered species: the Greater bamboo lemur (Prolemur simus). The park hosts furthermore 348 species of birds, 56 species of amphibians, 53 species of reptiles and 6 Carnivores and 4 bats.

== See also ==
- Kalambatritra Reserve at a distance of 20 kilometres (12 mi) from the Midongy du sud National Park.
- List of national parks of Madagascar
