= Antaninarenina =

Town in Madagascar

- Location in Madagascar
- Coordinates: 23.9333°S 46.9333°E
- Country: Madagascar
- Region: Atsimo-Atsinanana
- District: Befotaka Sud District
- Time zone: UTC3 (EAT)
- Postal code: 307

Antaninarenina is a town in Atsimo-Atsinanana Region in south-eastern Madagascar. It is one of five places in Madagascar with this same name.
