= 1996–97 South-West Indian Ocean cyclone season =

Cyclone season in the Southwest Indian Ocean

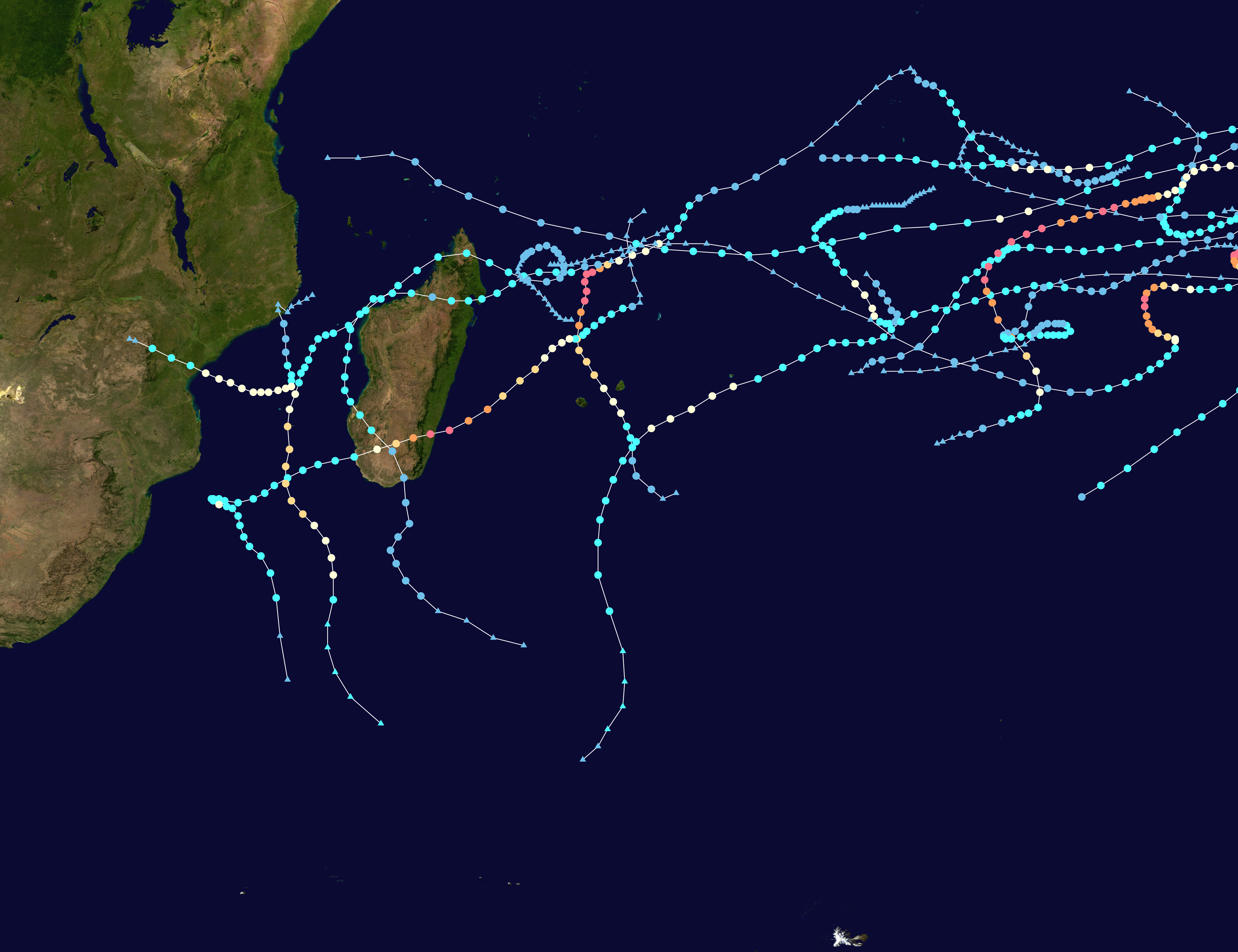
- Season summary map

Seasonal boundaries
- First system formed: August 16, 1996
- Last system dissipated: July 25, 1997

Strongest storm
- Name: Daniella and Helinda
  - Maximum winds: 185 km/h (115 mph) (10-minute sustained)
  - Lowest pressure: 915 hPa (mbar)

Seasonal statistics
- Total disturbances: 21 (record high)
- Total depressions: 14
- Total storms: 12 (5 unofficial)
- Tropical cyclones: 5
- Intense tropical cyclones: 3
- Total fatalities: 311
- Total damage: $50 million (1997 USD)

Related articles
- 1996–97 Australian region cyclone season; 1996–97 South Pacific cyclone season

The 1996–97 South-West Indian Ocean cyclone season was the longest on record, with both an unusually early start and unusually late ending. Most activity was from November through February. According to the Météo-France office (MFR) at Réunion, there were 21 tropical disturbances, 14 of which intensified into tropical depressions. There were 12 named storms, beginning with Antoinette and proceeding sequentially until Lisette. In addition, the Joint Typhoon Warning Center also warned on storms in the region, which identified five other tropical storms. Five of the storms attained tropical cyclone status, or with 10–minute maximum sustained winds of at least 120 km/h (75 mph); of these, three strengthened further into intense tropical cyclones, with Daniella and Helinda tied for strongest storm of the season.

In August, a tropical depression developed in the south-west Indian Ocean for the first time 27 years, and a month later, a rare September tropical disturbance formed. The first named storm, Antoinette, was the first of several to originate in the neighboring Australian basin, or east of 90° E; the subsequent two named storms also formed in the Australian region. In early December, Cyclone Daniella likely developed out of the remnants of previous Tropical Storm Chantelle. After reaching peak 10–minute winds of 185 km/h (115 mph), Daniella weakened and passed just southwest of Mauritius; there, the storm left heavy crop damage and indirectly caused three deaths.

In early January, Tropical Storm Fabriola was the first in a succession of three storms to move over Madagascar. The next – Cyclone Gretelle – killed 152 people when it struck southeastern Madagascar. Between January and February, Cyclone Pancho-Helinda lasted about 20 days between both the Australian and south-west Indian basins. Also in February, Tropical Storm Josie killed 36 people in western Madagascar after causing severe flooding. The final named storm was Tropical Storm Lisette, which dissipated on March 3 after striking Mozambique, killing three people. Despite the early end to the named storms, there were two additional disturbances, one of which became the first July tropical depression in 25 years.

== Season summary ==
During the season, the Météo-France office (MFR) based on Réunion island issued warnings in tropical cyclones within the basin, as part of its role as a Regional Specialized Meteorological Center. The agency estimated intensities via the Dvorak technique, which uses images from two satellites by the American National Oceanic and Atmospheric Administration. On certain days, the satellites had limited coverage in the eastern portion of the region, which limited warning capability. At the time, the MFR issued warnings on tropical cyclones in the Indian Ocean from the coast of Africa to 90° E, south of the equator. The Joint Typhoon Warning Center – a joint United States Navy – United States Air Force task force – also issued tropical cyclone warnings for the region. Wind estimates from Météo-France and most other basins throughout the world are sustained over 10 minutes, while estimates from the United States-based Joint Typhoon Warning Center are sustained over 1 minute. 10 minute winds are about 1.14 times the amount of 1 minute winds.

The season was active, about 50% above normal, and was the fourth consecutive above-normal season. There was a total of 100 days on which disturbances, depressions, storms, or cyclones were active, compared to the average of 68. There were 12 named storms, above the normal of 9. Five intensified into tropical cyclones, also above the normal of 4. The season was the longest on record, with the first depression in August 1996 and the final depression in July 1997. Despite the long season, there was minimal activity from March to May, which usually represents about 25% of total activity. In addition, February was relatively quiet despite being the climatological peak. Majority of the storms developed in the northeast portion of the basin, and the storms took a variety of tracks during their durations.

== Systems ==
=== Tropical Depression A1 ===
- Tropical depression (MFR)
- Tropical storm (SSHWS)
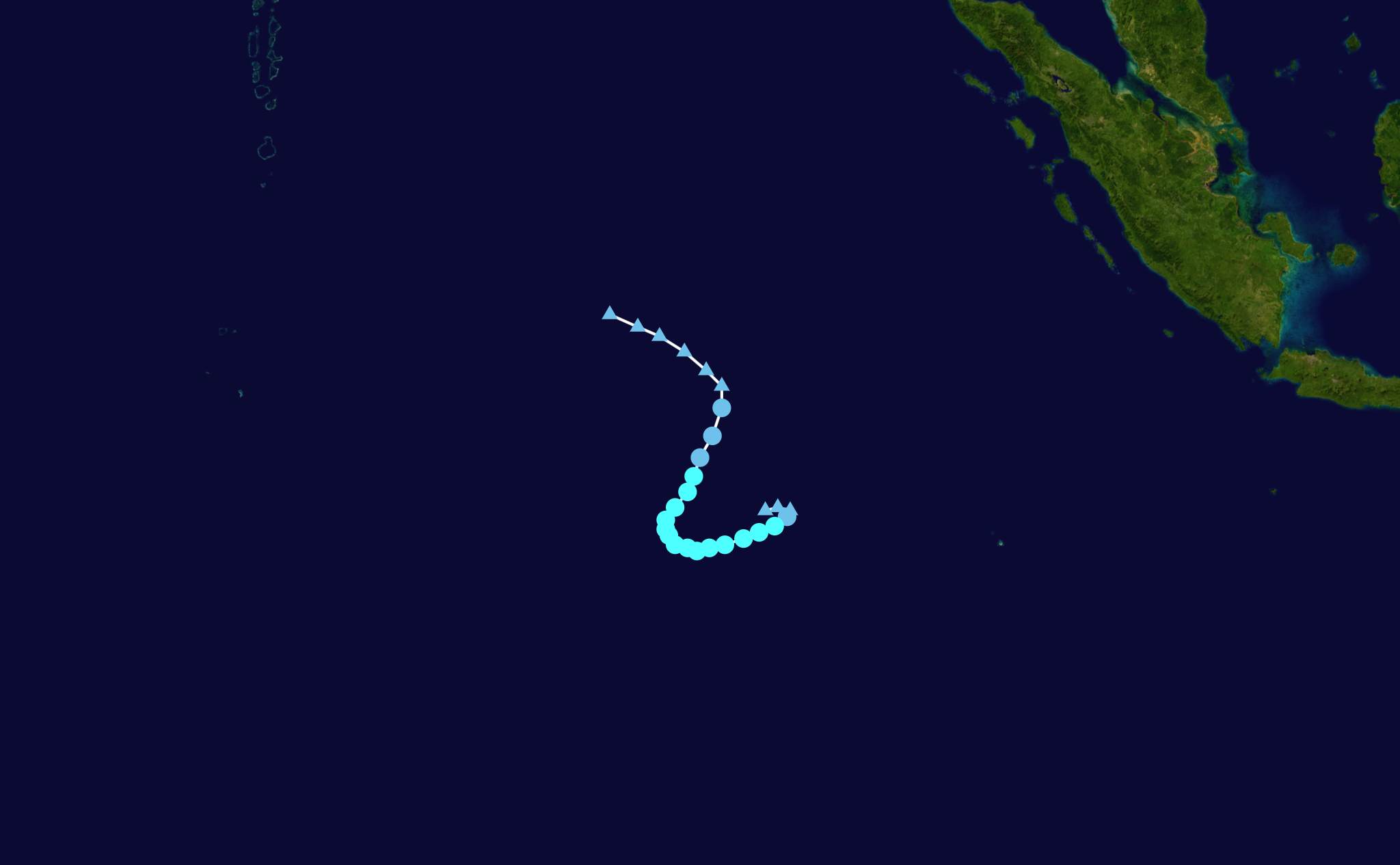
- Duration: August 16 – August 19
- Peak intensity: 55 km/h (35 mph) (10-min); 995 hPa (mbar)

For several weeks in early August – the middle of winter in the southern hemisphere – an area of warm water temperatures of over 26 °C (79 °F) persisted in the northeast portion of the basin. The region was unaffected by the progression of troughs that would usually decrease the water temperatures. On August 13, an area of convection persisted east of the Chagos, in association with the near-equatorial trough, later developing a low-pressure area and well-defined circulation. On August 16, the system organized into a tropical disturbance, becoming Tropical Depression A1 the next day; this made it the first such storm in the month of August since Tropical Depression Aline in August 1969. Also on August 17, the JTWC initiated advisories on Tropical Cyclone 2S. The depression moved southward, developing a well-defined central dense overcast, despite the presence of northerly wind shear. On August 18, an anticyclone turned the depression eastward; that day, the JTWC estimated peak 1–minute winds of 85 km/h (55 mph), and the MFR estimated a peak 10–minute intensity of 55 km/h (35 mph). The depression later began to weaken under the influence of an approaching trough, and was dissipating as it crossed into the Australian region on August 19. The JTWC tracked the circulation for another two days, estimating that the system turned sharply to the west, and the circulation dissipated on August 23.

=== Tropical Disturbance A2 ===
- Tropical disturbance (MFR)
- Tropical storm (SSHWS)
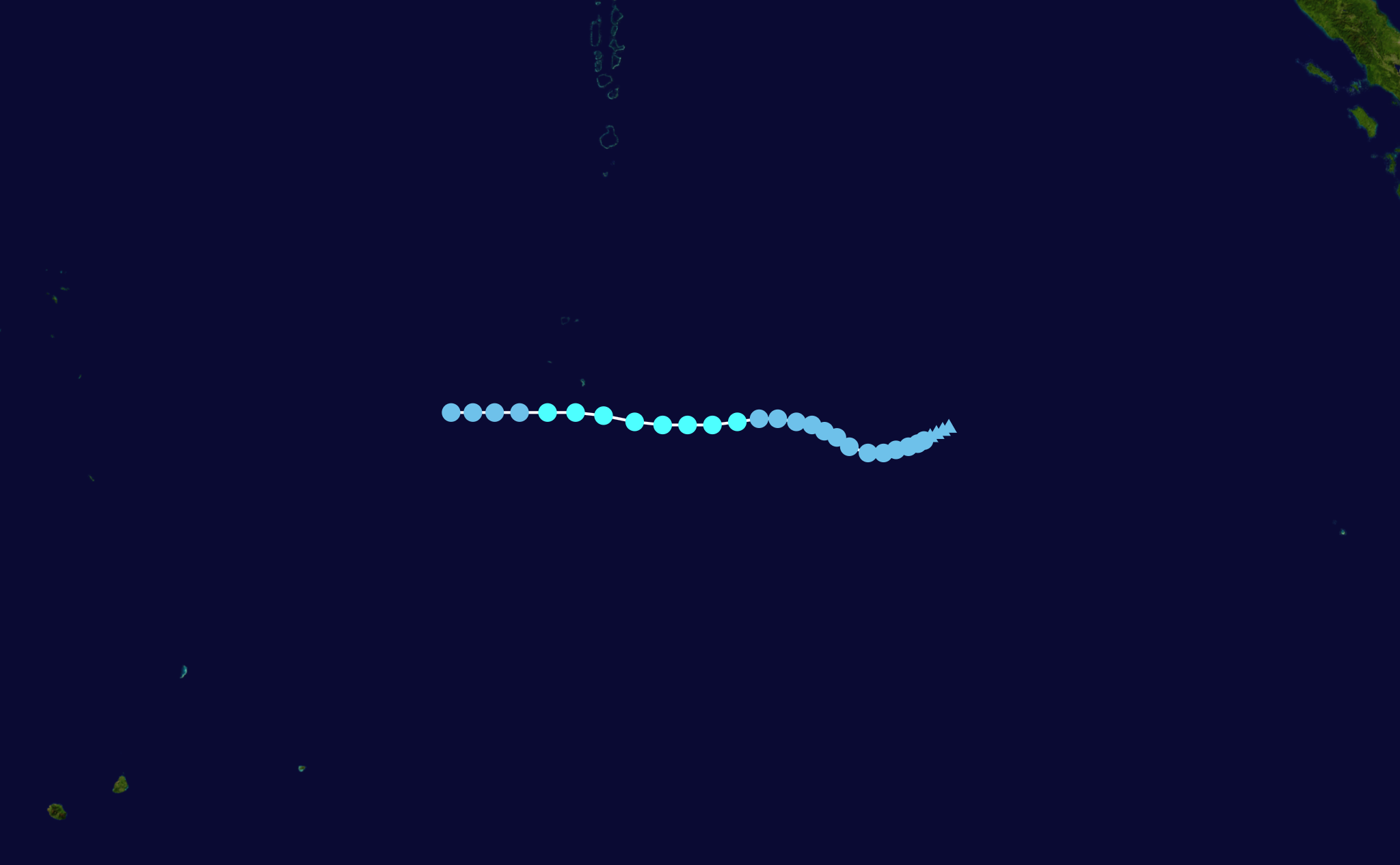
- Duration: September 6 – September 10
- Peak intensity: 45 km/h (30 mph) (10-min);

Less than a month later, another area of convection developed within the near-equatorial trough near the Chagos archipelago, due to persistent warm water temperatures. On September 6, the MFR classified it as Tropical Disturbance A2, and the next day, the JTWC initiated advisories on Tropical Cyclone 3S while the storm was over the northeastern portion of the basin. This was a fairly unusual event, as there is only an average of 0.4 storms in the month of September across the southern hemisphere. Located along the northern side of a ridge, the storm tracked westward, but failed to intensity beyond 1–minute winds of 75 km/h (45 mph) due to wind shear. On September 10, the storm dissipated to the west-southwest of Diego Garcia.

=== Severe Tropical Storm Antoinette ===
- Severe tropical storm (MFR)
- Category 1 tropical cyclone (SSHWS)
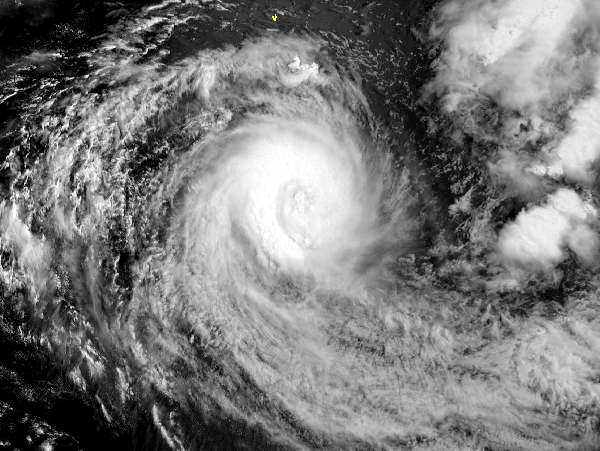
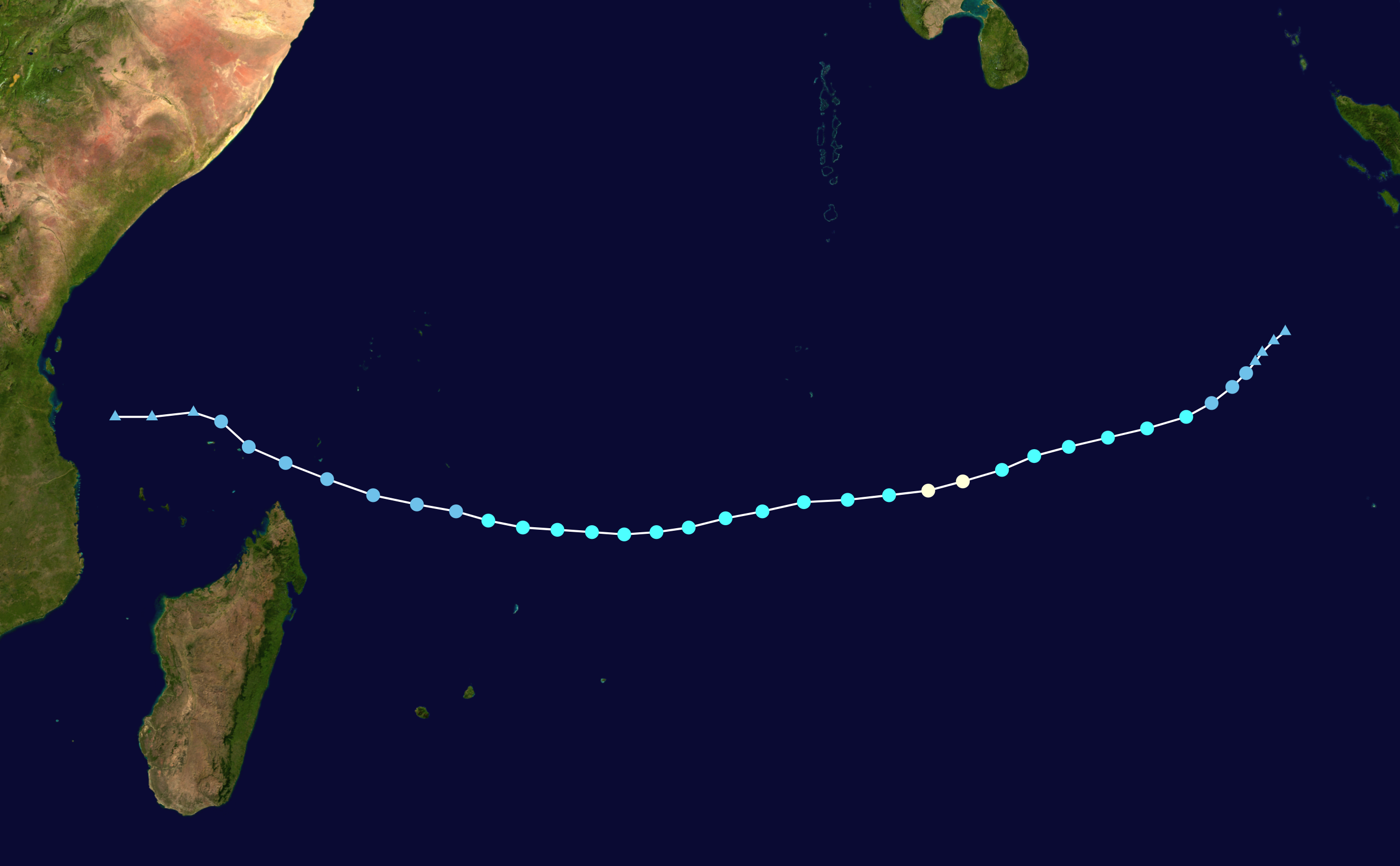
- Duration: October 17 (entered basin) – October 21
- Peak intensity: 110 km/h (70 mph) (10-min); 965 hPa (mbar)

In the middle of October, the Intertropical Convergence Zone (ITCZ) was active over the northeast portion of the basin and into the adjacent Australian region, spawning a low-pressure area on October 15 northwest of the Cocos Islands. With a large ridge to the south, the system tracked southwestward, crossing into the south-west Indian Ocean as a tropical depression on October 17. Also on that day, the JTWC began issuing warnings on the system as Tropical Cyclone 4S. On October 18, the depression intensified into Tropical Storm Antoinette after developing a well-defined central dense overcast, and began turning more to the west-southwest. That day, Antoinette strengthened to a peak intensity of just below tropical cyclone status, or with 10–minute winds just below 120 km/h (75 mph). Around that time, the storm developed an eye feature, but that quickly dissipated. Antoinette began weakening steadily on October 20 due to increasing wind shear, and by that time it was moving quickly westward. After the circulation became largely devoid of deep convection, the storm weakened into a tropical depression on October 21. The next day, Antoinette passed about 200 km (120 mi) north of the northern tip of Madagascar, and dissipated on October 24 in the Mozambique Channel.

=== Intense Tropical Cyclone Melanie–Bellamine ===
- Intense tropical cyclone (MFR)
- Category 4 tropical cyclone (SSHWS)
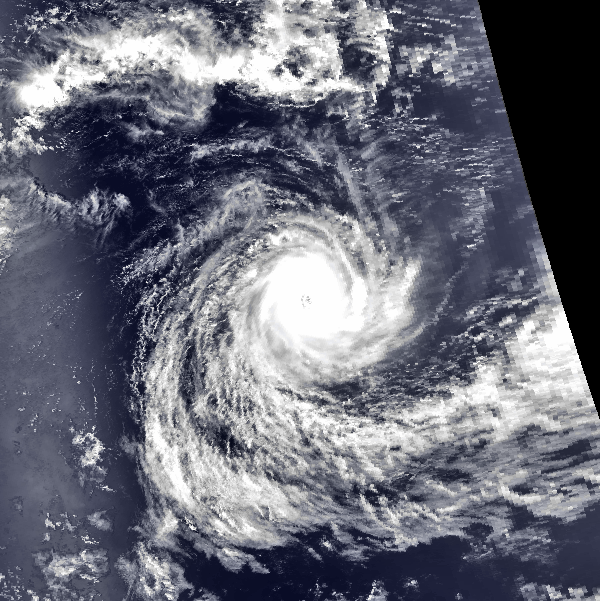
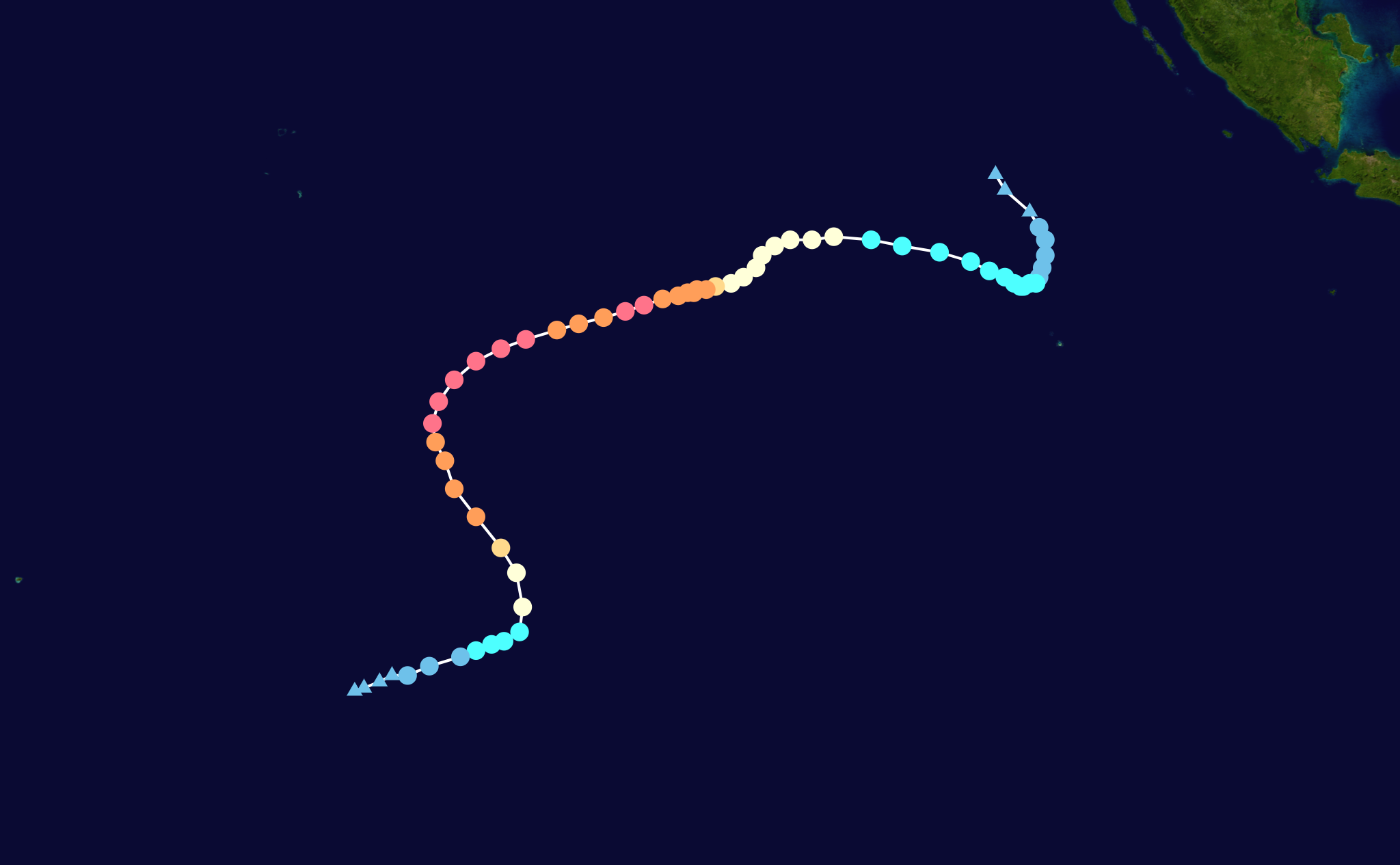
- Duration: November 1 (entered basin) – November 11
- Peak intensity: 175 km/h (110 mph) (10-min); 925 hPa (mbar)

In late October, the ITCZ developed a persistent area of convection west of the Indonesian island of Sumatra. A tropical low formed on October 28 within the Australian region, which initially failed to develop much due to persistent wind shear. The Australian Bureau of Meteorology (BoM) named the system Melanie on October 31 to the north of the Cocos Islands. The newly upgraded storm tracked generally westward due to a ridge to the south, and entered the south-west Indian Ocean on November 1 as a strong tropical storm. At that time, Melanie was renamed Bellamine. After the ridged moved farther away, the storm turned more to the southwest and began quickly intensifying. Early on November 3, Bellamine attained tropical cyclone status, and the next day reached peak 10–minute winds of 175 km/h (110 mph); this made it an intense tropical cyclone.

After reaching peak winds, Bellamine slowed its motion on November 4 while moving between two high-pressure areas, and weakened slightly. After another ridge built, the cyclone resumed a steady west-southwest track, although its 10–minute winds decreased to 140 km/h (85 mph) by November 6. That day, Bellamine began restrengthening as the eye became increasingly well-defined, 70 km (43 mi) in diameter. On November 7, the storm re-attained intense tropical cyclone status, as well as its previous peak intensity according to MFR. This was a rare occurrence of an early November storm becoming an intense tropical cyclone on two occasions. Meanwhile, the JTWC estimated peak 1–minute winds of 230 km/h (145 mph). A strong approaching trough turned Bellamine to the southeast on November 8 and incurred rapid weakening due to wind shear. After the trough passed the cyclone, Bellamine turned back to the southwest on November 10 as a weakening tropical depression. Two days later, the circulation dissipated without having affected land.

=== Severe Tropical Storm Chantelle ===
- Severe tropical storm (MFR)
- Category 1 tropical cyclone (SSHWS)
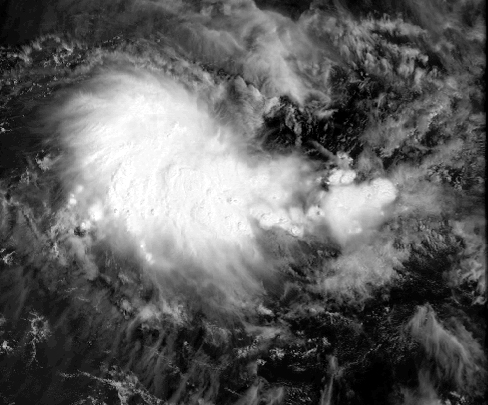
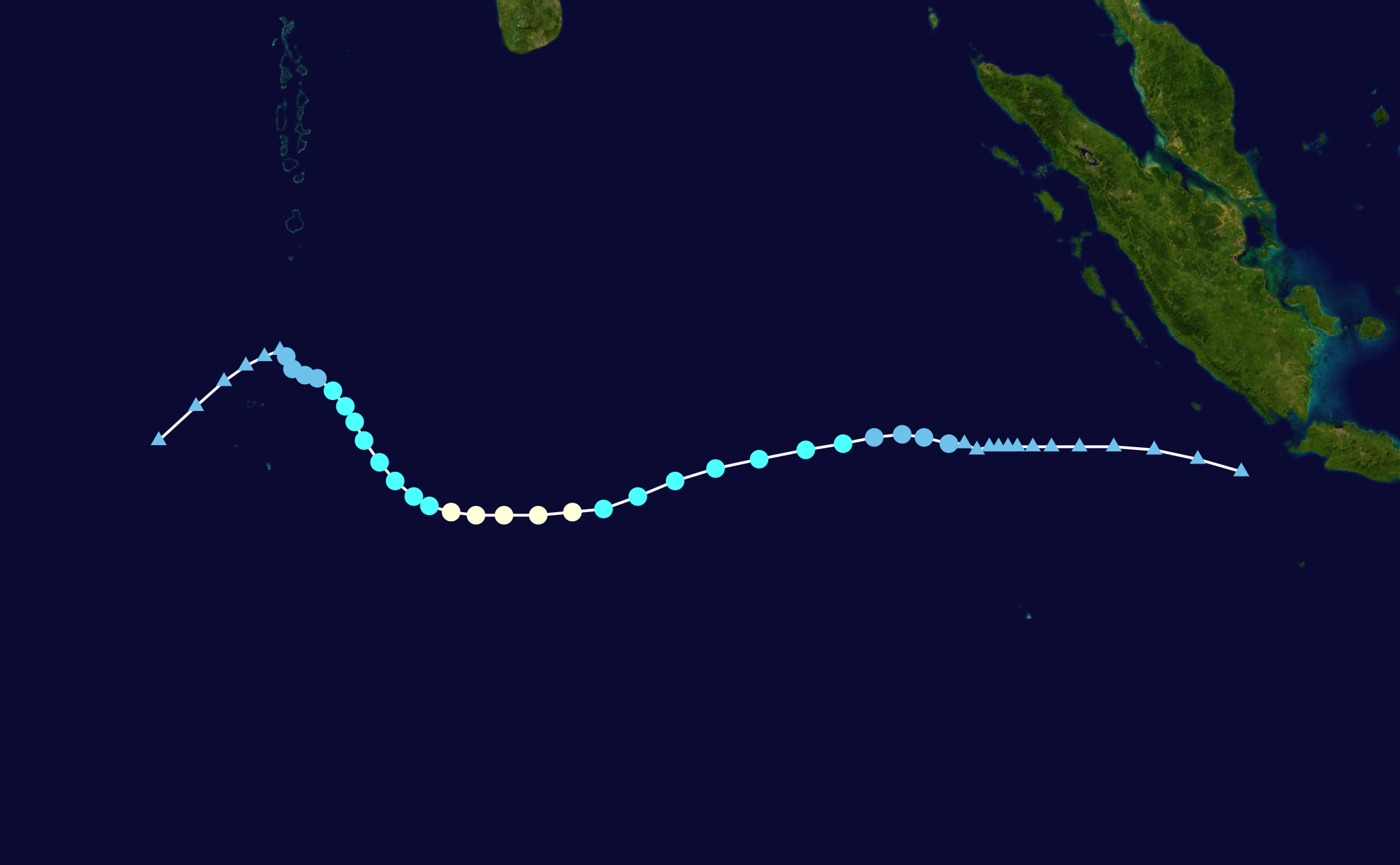
- Duration: November 24 (entered region) – November 30
- Peak intensity: 95 km/h (60 mph) (10-min); 980 hPa (mbar)

Similar to previous storms Antoinette and Bellamine, Tropical Storm Chantelle originated from the ITCZ in the Australian region. On November 23, the MFR began tracking the system as a tropical disturbance off the west coast of Sumatra. The system fluctuated in intensity while moving westward, entering the south-west Indian as a tropical depression on November 24. Around that time, the JTWC had begun classifying it as Tropical Cyclone 7S. On November 26, the depression intensified into Tropical Storm Chantelle, and the convection continued to organize despite the presence of wind shear. That day, the JTWC estimated peak 1–minute winds of 120 km/h (75 mph). On November 27, the MFR estimated peak 10–minute winds of 95 km/h (60 mph). An approaching trough imparted significant weakening, and Chantelle weakened to tropical depression status 18 hours after it was at peak intensity. A ridge behind the trough steered the weakening system to the northwest, causing Chantelle to reach the low latitude of 5° S. Widespread cloudiness made it difficult for MFR to continue tracking the circulation, and the agency issued the final advisory on November 30 northwest of Diego Garcia. The JTWC continued tracking the storm for several more days, and the remnants of Chantelle likely contributed to the formation of the subsequent Tropical Cyclone Daniella.

=== Intense Tropical Cyclone Daniella ===
- Intense tropical cyclone (MFR)
- Category 4 tropical cyclone (SSHWS)
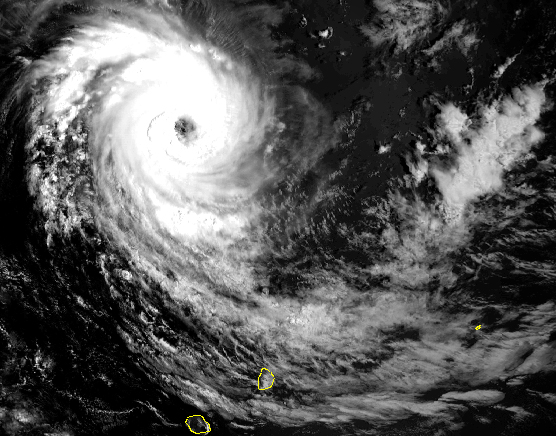
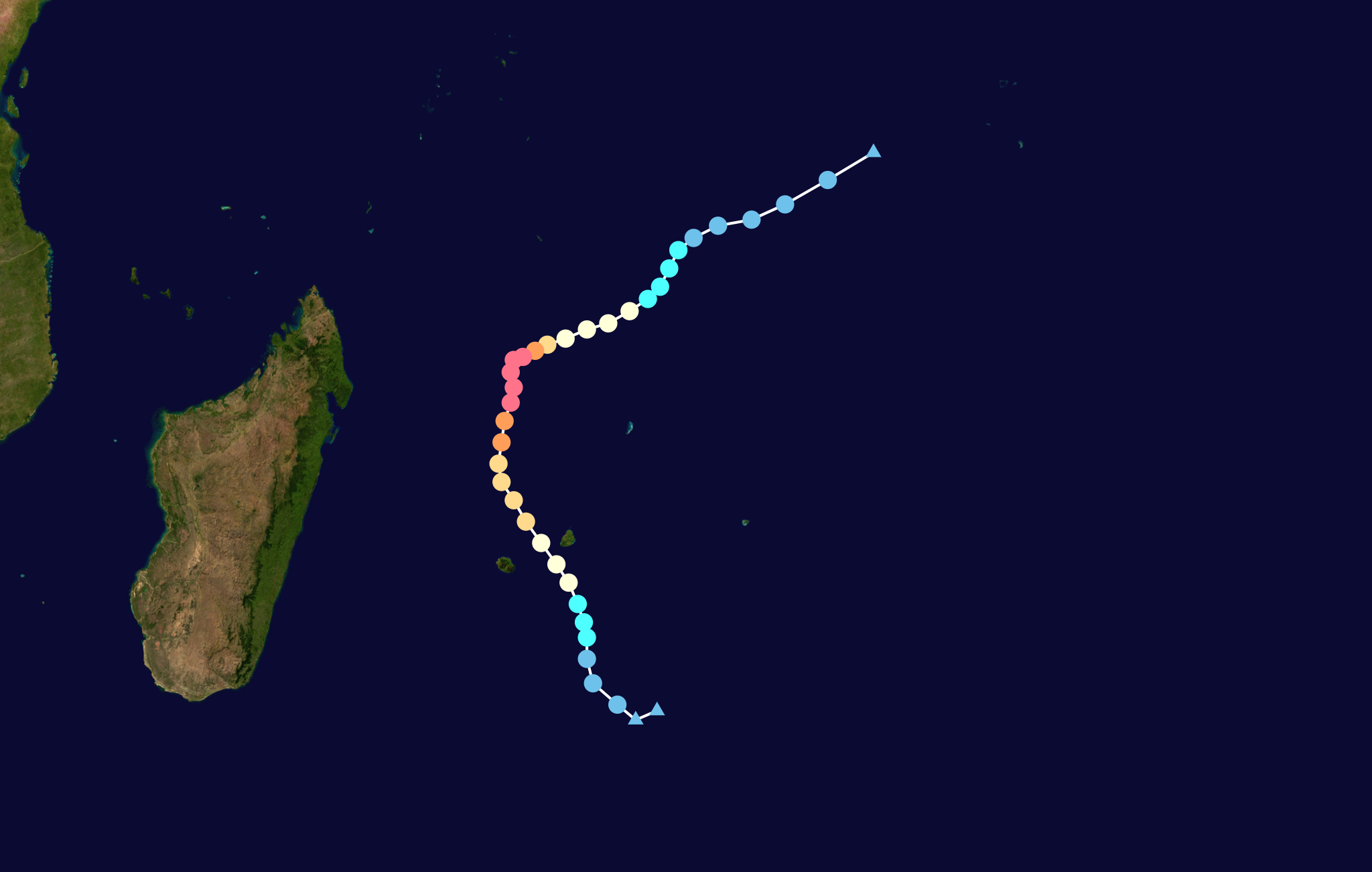
- Duration: December 2 – December 10
- Peak intensity: 185 km/h (115 mph) (10-min); 915 hPa (mbar)

After the previous Tropical Storm Chantelle lost its circulation near Diego Garcia on November 30, residual convection persisted and moved to the southwest due to a large ridge. A new tropical disturbance developed on December 2 after wind shear diminished. Because the remnants took longer than 48 hours to redevelop, the MFR policy at the time was to treat the disturbance as a new system. On December 3, the depression intensified into Tropical Storm Daniella, and an eye began to form the next day, indicative of further strengthening. The MFR upgraded Daniella to tropical cyclone status on December 5. At 1800 UTC that day, both the MFR and JTWC estimated peak winds; the former agency estimated 10–minute winds of 185 km/h (115 mph), making Daniella the most intense tropical cyclone worldwide in 1996, with JTWC estimated 1–minute winds of 220 km/h (135 mph). Around that time, the cyclone turned to the south due to an approaching trough. The eye, previously well-defined and 40 km (25 mi) in diameter at its peak, gradually became less organized due to decreasing water temperatures. Daniella turned more to the southeast on December 8, bringing it between the islands of Réunion and Mauritius after weakening into a strong tropical storm. A sharp increase in wind shear removed the convection from the circulation on December 9, weakening Daniella to tropical depression status. Two days later, the circulation dissipated.

Late in its duration, Daniella passed within 55 km (34 mi) of Mauritius, producing wind gusts of 154 km/h (96 mph) and about 300 mm (12 in) of rainfall. Port Louis recorded a storm surge of 229 mm (9.0 in) during the passage. About half of the island lost power and many lost water service. Daniella also left heavy crop damage, due to the heavy rainfall. All flights were canceled during the storm's passage. Three were three indirect deaths on Mauritius, including one from a road accident and another due to electrocution. After threatening to directly strike Réunion, the cyclone passed about 110 km (68 mi) northeast of the island. As a result, winds were not as strong as on Mauritius.

=== Moderate Tropical Storm Elvina ===
- Moderate tropical storm (MFR)
- Tropical storm (SSHWS)
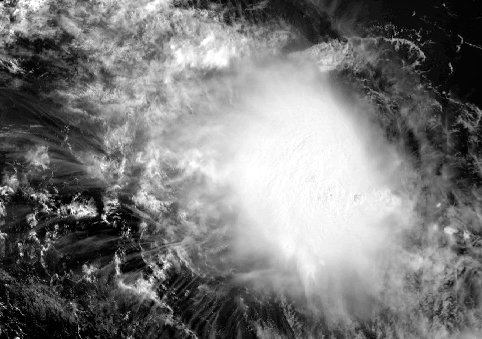
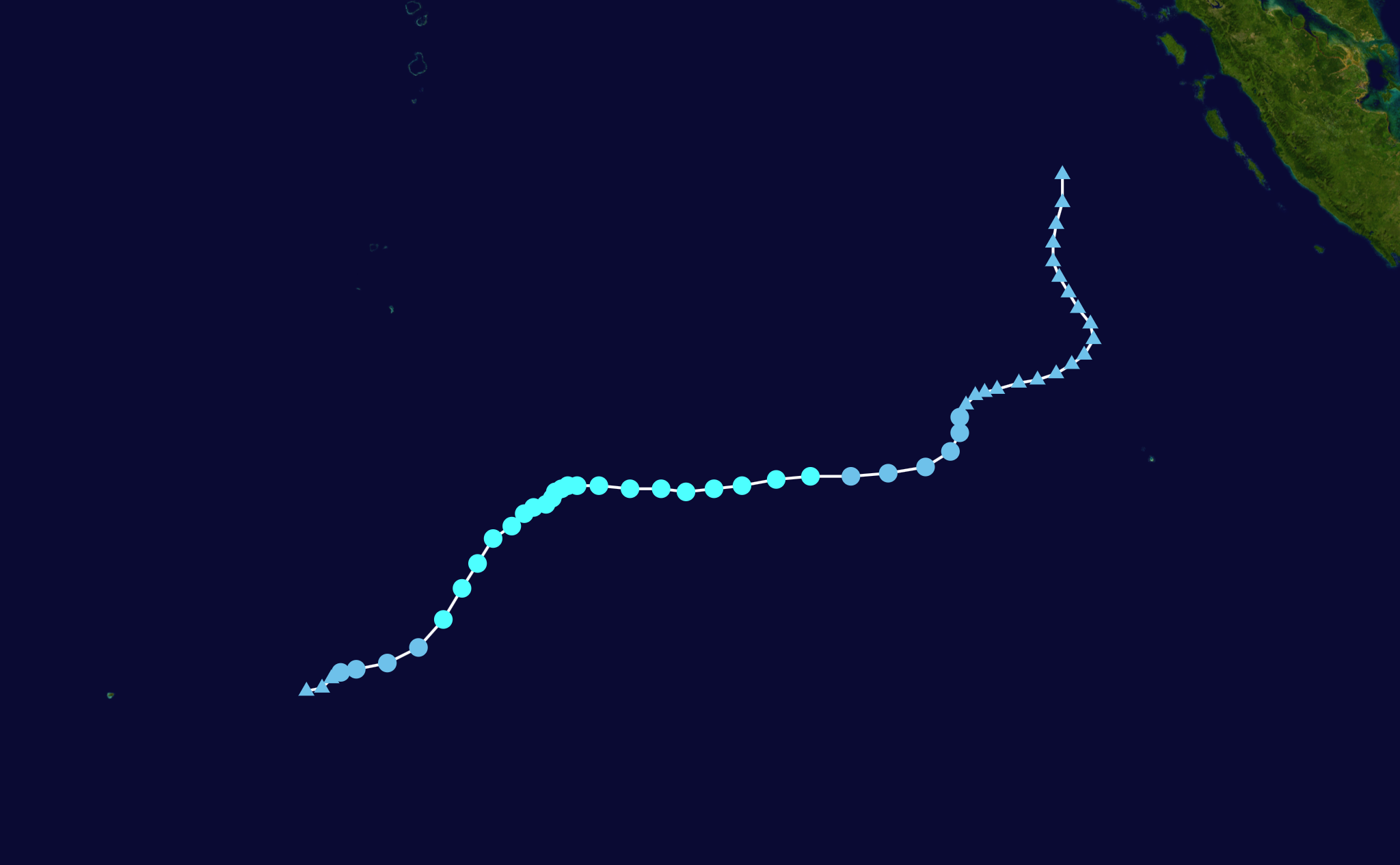
- Duration: December 9 (entered basin) – December 16
- Peak intensity: 85 km/h (50 mph) (10-min); 985 hPa (mbar)

In early December, the ITCZ spawned an area of convection near the boundary between the south-west Indian and Australian regions. On December 8, the MFR estimated that a disturbance formed just within the Australian region, which entered this basin on December 9. After the convection developed into a central dense overcast, the system intensified into Tropical Storm Elvina on December 10. Later that day, the MFR estimated peak 10–minute winds of 85 km/h (55 mph). On December 11, the JTWC estimated peak 1–minute winds of 100 km/h (60 mph). By that time, Elvina had been moving steadily west-southwestward, although the storm slowed on December 12. A polar trough caused the storm to accelerate to the southwest on December 14 while simultaneously increasing wind shear, causing weakening. On December 16, Elvina dissipated well to the south of Diego Garcia.

=== Severe Tropical Storm Fabriola ===
- Severe tropical storm (MFR)
- Tropical storm (SSHWS)
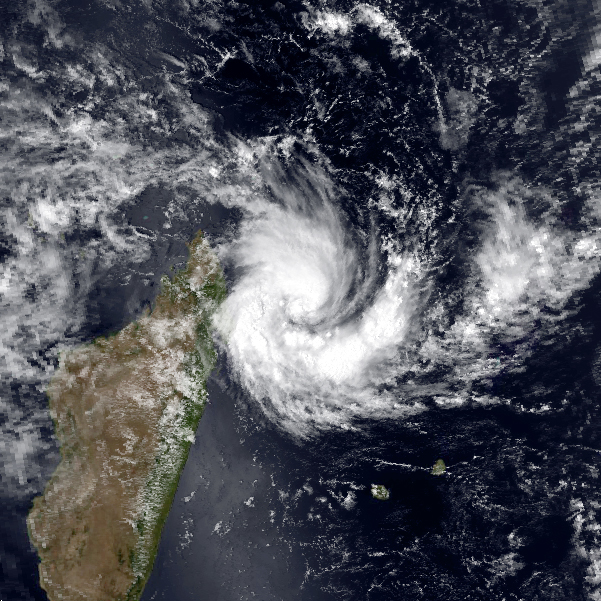
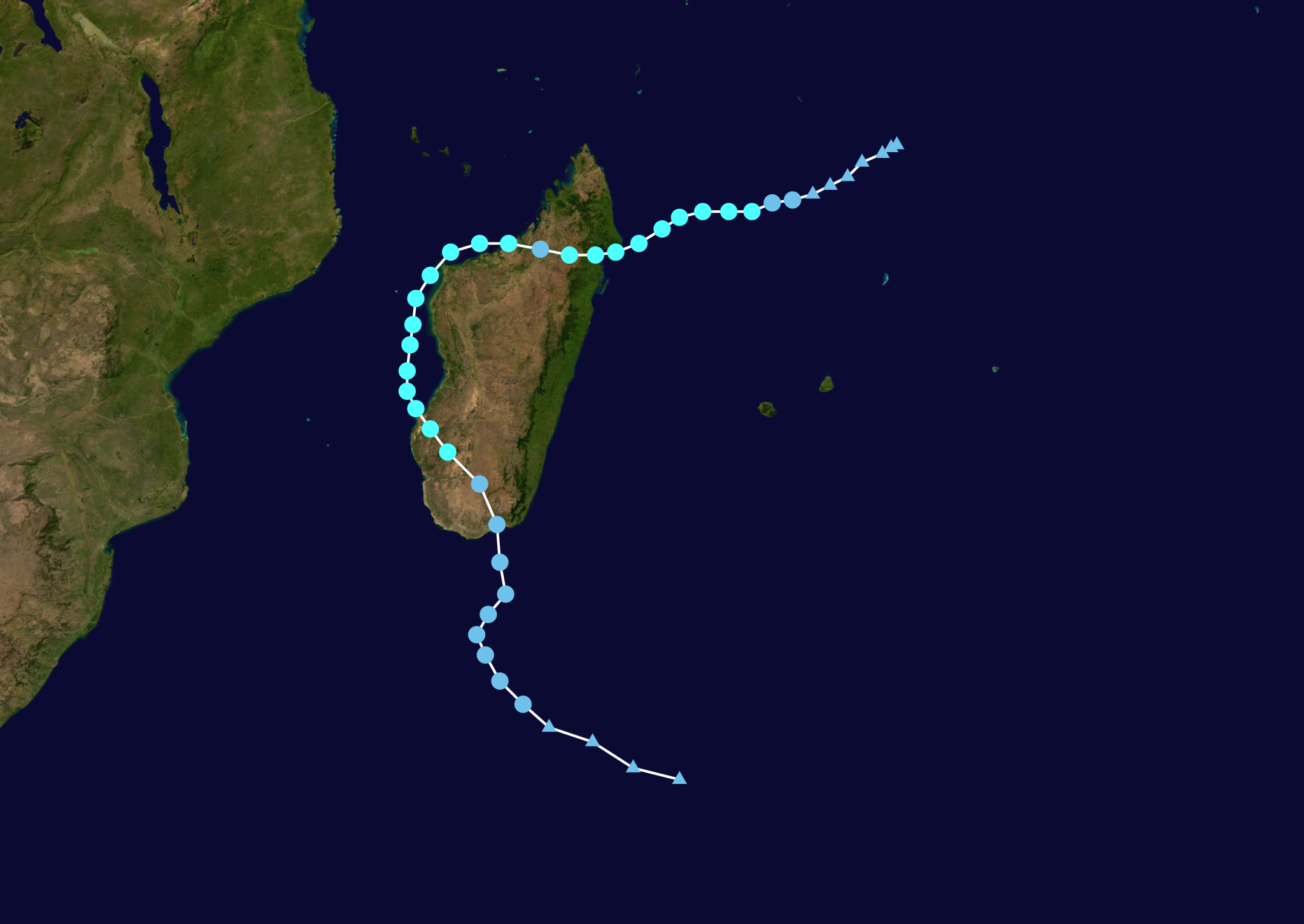
- Duration: January 2 – January 9
- Peak intensity: 100 km/h (65 mph) (10-min); 985 hPa (mbar)

Toward the end of December, the ITCZ produced a widespread area of convection to the northeast of Madagascar. A circulation developed on January 2 about 150 km (93 mi) of Tromelin Island, becoming a tropical disturbance. After the convection organized more, the system intensified into Tropical Storm Fabriola on January 3. Moving southwestward, the storm strengthened somewhat, reaching 10–minute winds of 85 km/h (55 mph) before making landfall on the Masoala Peninsula in eastern Madagascar. Around that time, the JTWC estimated peak 1–minute winds of 1–winds of 110 km/h (70 mph). Fabriola quickly weakened into a tropical depression over land and emerged into the Mozambique Channel on January 5. Due to proximity to land, the system failed to re-intensify initially despite warm waters. On January 6, while turning to the south around western Madagascar, Fabriola again attained tropical storm status. The next day, the MFR estimated peak 10–minute winds of 100 km/h (60 mph), and after turning to the southeast, Fabriola struck southwestern Madagascar near Morombe late on January 7. The storm again quickly weakened over land, emerging back into the Indian Ocean on January 8 as a tropical disturbance. After turning more to the south, Fabriola dissipated on January 10 when it was absorbed by a nearby trough. Fabriola spread rainfall across Madagascar, which proved beneficial for crops.

=== Tropical Cyclone Gretelle ===
- Tropical cyclone (MFR)
- Category 4 tropical cyclone (SSHWS)
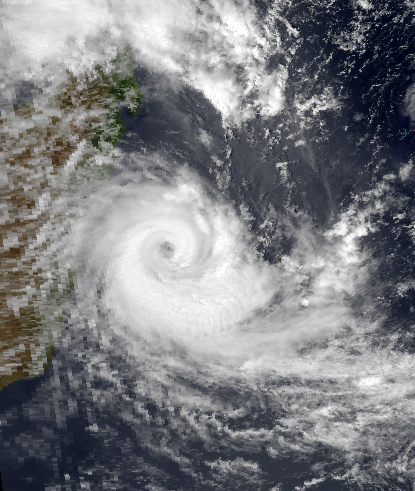
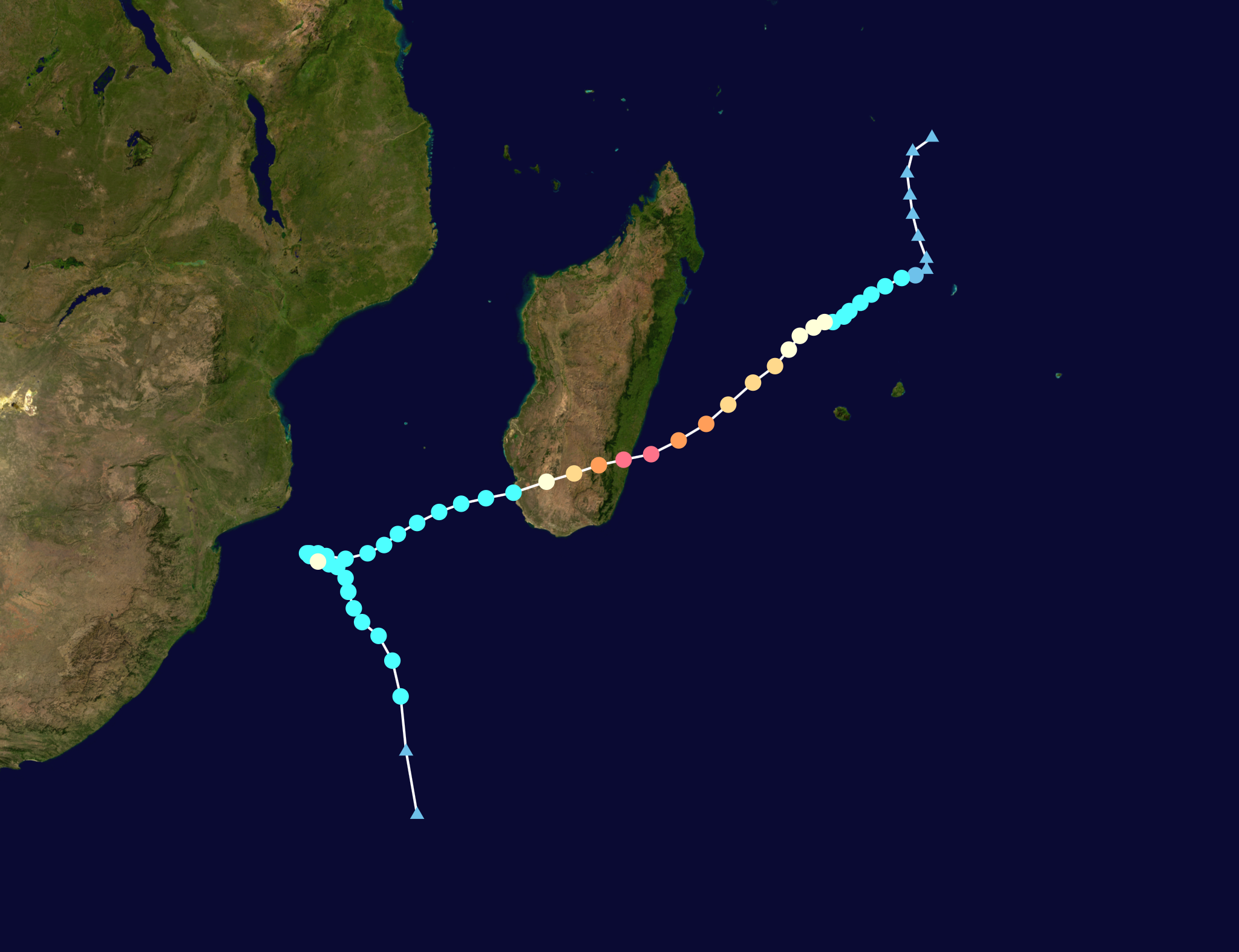
- Duration: January 19 – January 31
- Peak intensity: 140 km/h (85 mph) (10-min); 950 hPa (mbar)

The ITCZ spawned a tropical disturbance on January 19 just west of St. Brandon, and within a day intensified into Tropical Storm Gretelle. With a large ridge to the southeast, the storm moved southwestward and gradually intensified, becoming a tropical cyclone on January 22. Around that time, the storm passed about 300 km (190 mi) northwest of Réunion. Early on January 23, the MFR estimated peak 10–minute winds of 140 km/h (85 mph), while JTWC estimated 1–minute winds of 215 km/h (135 mph) the next day. While near peak intensity, Gretelle made landfall on southeastern Madagascar near Farafangana, the first cyclone to hit the region in 41 years. Gretelle rapidly weakened into a tropical depression over land, but gradually re-intensified into a moderate tropical storm in the Mozambique Channel. A trough turned the storm to the southeast on January 28, and three days later the storm dissipated south-southwest of Madagascar.

In Réunion, Gretelle dropped nearly 1 m (3.3 ft) of rainfall in the mountainous center of the island. The cyclone produced wind gusts of over 220 km/h (140 mph) at Farafangana, Madagascar, along with heavy rainfall that washed away the local meteorological station. Flooding up to 16 m (52 ft) was reported in some areas, which washed away several boats and forced residents to hold onto trees to survive. Many houses were damaged or destroyed, leaving 80,000 people homeless. The World Food Programme estimated that Gretelle destroyed 7,000 tons of rice, 123,500 tons of cassava, and 8,000 tons of cash crops, mostly to coffee. Overall, about 200 people were killed or left missing in Madagascar, with 152 confirmed fatalities by two weeks after the storm, and damage was estimated at $50 million (1997 USD). Later, the storm caused power outages and knocked over trees in southeastern Mozambique.

=== Intense Tropical Cyclone Pancho–Helinda ===
- Intense tropical cyclone (MFR)
- Category 4 tropical cyclone (SSHWS)
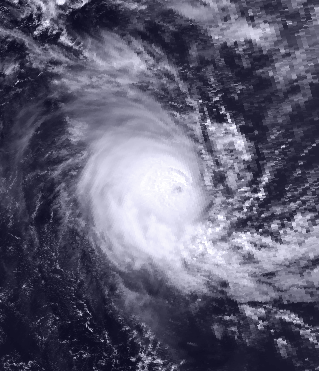
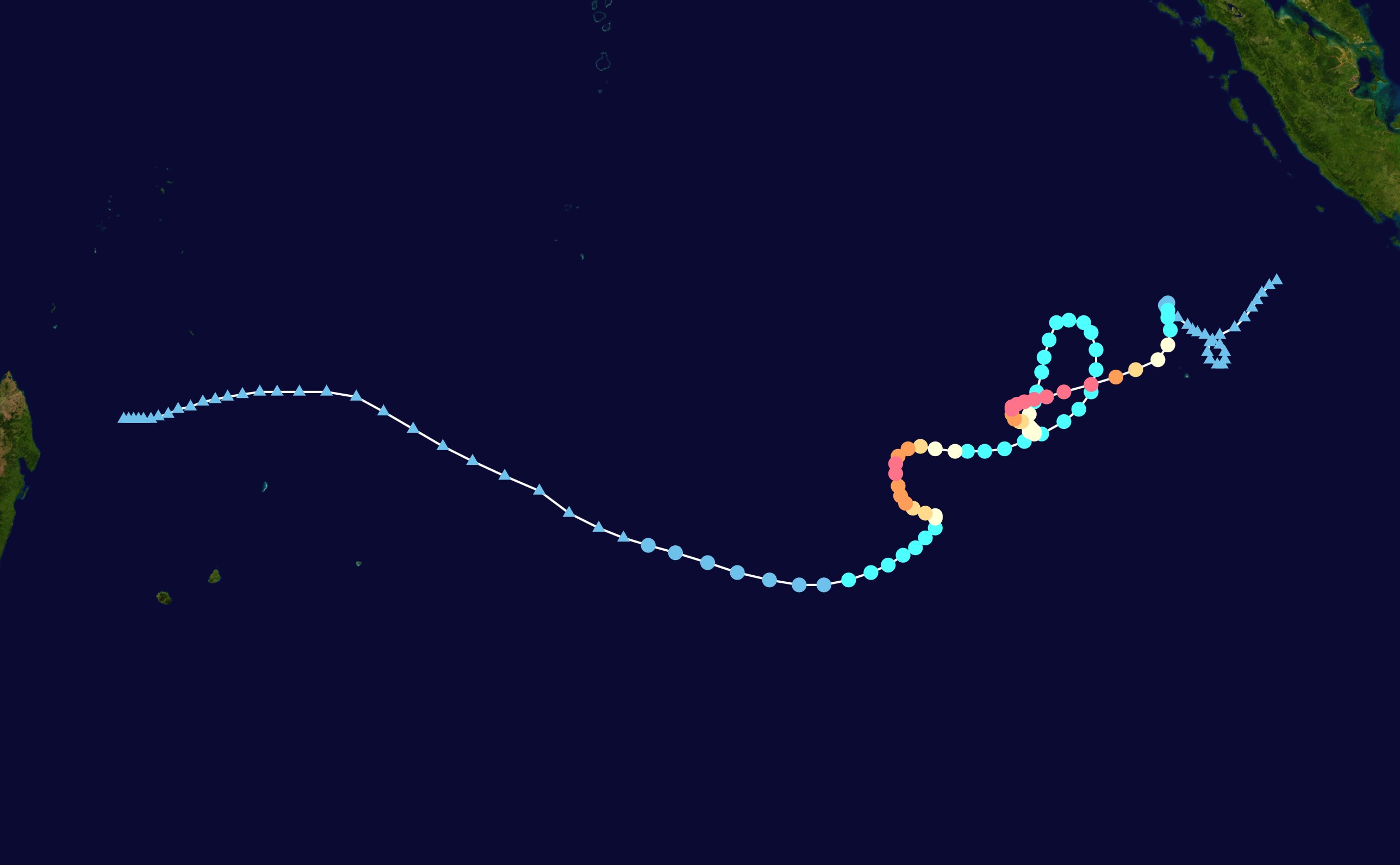
- Duration: January 23 (briefly entered basin); January 31 (reentered basin) – February 7
- Peak intensity: 185 km/h (115 mph) (10-min); 915 hPa (mbar)

The long-lived Cyclone Pancho-Helinda formed on January 18 in the Australian region from the monsoon trough to the north of the Cocos Islands. For several days, the system meandered in several directions before maintaining a southwest trajectory on January 21. Around that time, the system had intensified into Tropical Cyclone Pancho, reaching 10–minute winds of 205 km/h (125 mph) before weakening occurred. On January 23, the cyclone entered the south-west Indian Ocean, at which time Pancho was renamed Helinda. Around that time, the storm was located between two ridges, causing the motion to become nearly stationary, and by January 24 Helinda had re-entered the Australian region. Around that time, the storm began undergoing a large loop to the east of 90° E, during which the winds decreased below tropical storm status. The influence of the monsoon trough turned the storm back to the south on January 29, and a day later a building ridge turned the storm back to the west. On January 31, Helinda again crossed into the south-west Indian Ocean as an intensifying tropical storm.

With warm waters and favorable upper-level conditions, Helinda attained cyclone status on February 1, and the MFR estimated peak 10–minute winds of 185 km/h (115 mph). Around the same time, the JTWC estimated peak 1–minute winds of 215 km/h (135 mph), slightly below its estimate for the cyclone's peak winds in the Australian region. Due to a powerful ridge near Île Amsterdam, Helinda turned to the southeast on February 2, where cooler water temperatures induced weakening. Two days later, strong wind shear contributed to further weakening, and the storm deteriorated to tropical depression status. Turning back to the west, the circulation was declared dissipated by the MFR on February 7, although the JTWC continued tracking Helinda until February 14 when the system was off the northeast coast of Madagascar.

=== Severe Tropical Storm Iletta ===
- Severe tropical storm (MFR)
- Category 1 tropical cyclone (SSHWS)
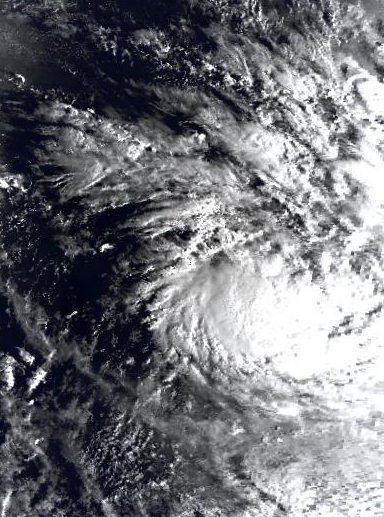
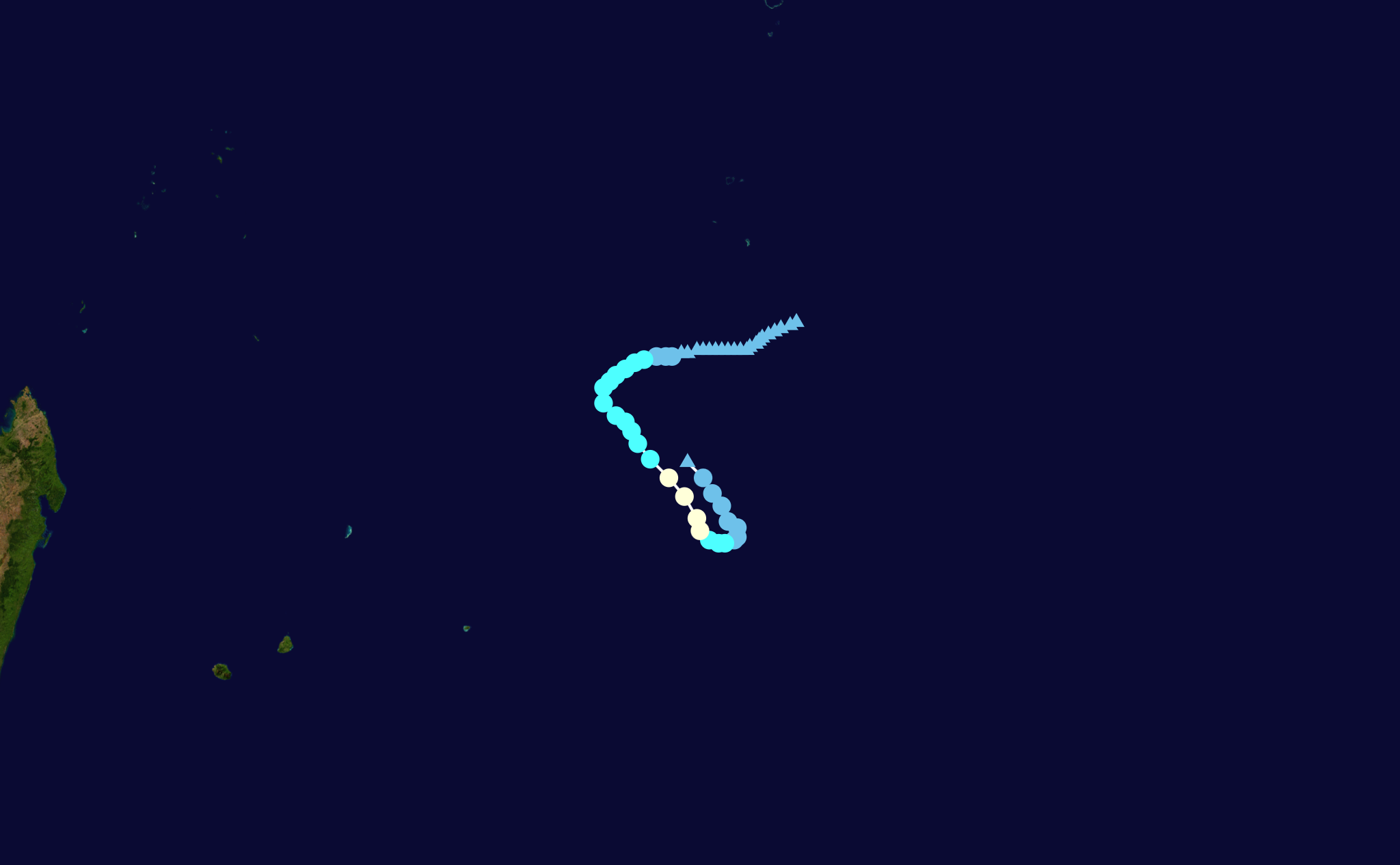
- Duration: January 24 – January 30
- Peak intensity: 100 km/h (65 mph) (10-min); 975 hPa (mbar)

On January 23, the ITCZ spawned an area of convection to the southwest of Diego Garcia, west of Helinda and east of Gretelle. The system quickly developed an organized central dense overcast, but failed to become a tropical cyclone due to the lack of a circulation in the region. Late on January 24, the system developed into a tropical depression, by which time the Mauritius Meteorological Services had named it Iletta. The depression quickly intensified into a tropical storm, but further development halted on January 25. Due to a nearby trough, the storm tracked to the southeast. Iletta resumed intensification on January 26, quickly reaching peak 10–winds of 100 km/h (60 mph); the JTWC meanwhile estimated peak 1–minute winds of 140 km/h (85 mph). Subsequently, increased wind shear weakened Iletta, and within 24 hours the storm had decreased from peak intensity to tropical depression status. After the trough passed the storm, Iletta turned to the north under the influence of a ridge to the south, dissipating on January 30 about 305 km (190 mi) east-southeast of where it initially formed.

=== Tropical Cyclone Josie ===
- Tropical cyclone (MFR)
- Category 2 tropical cyclone (SSHWS)
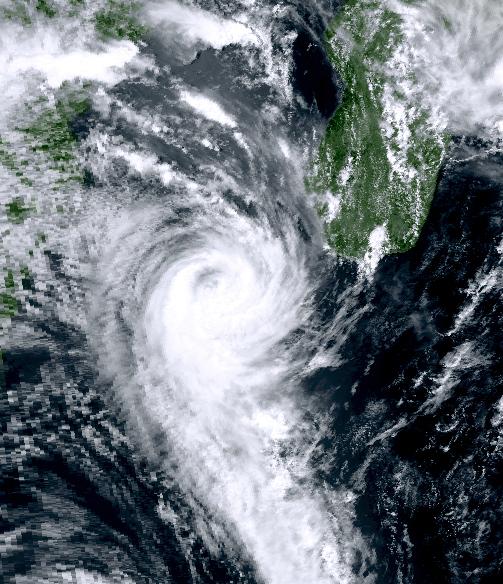
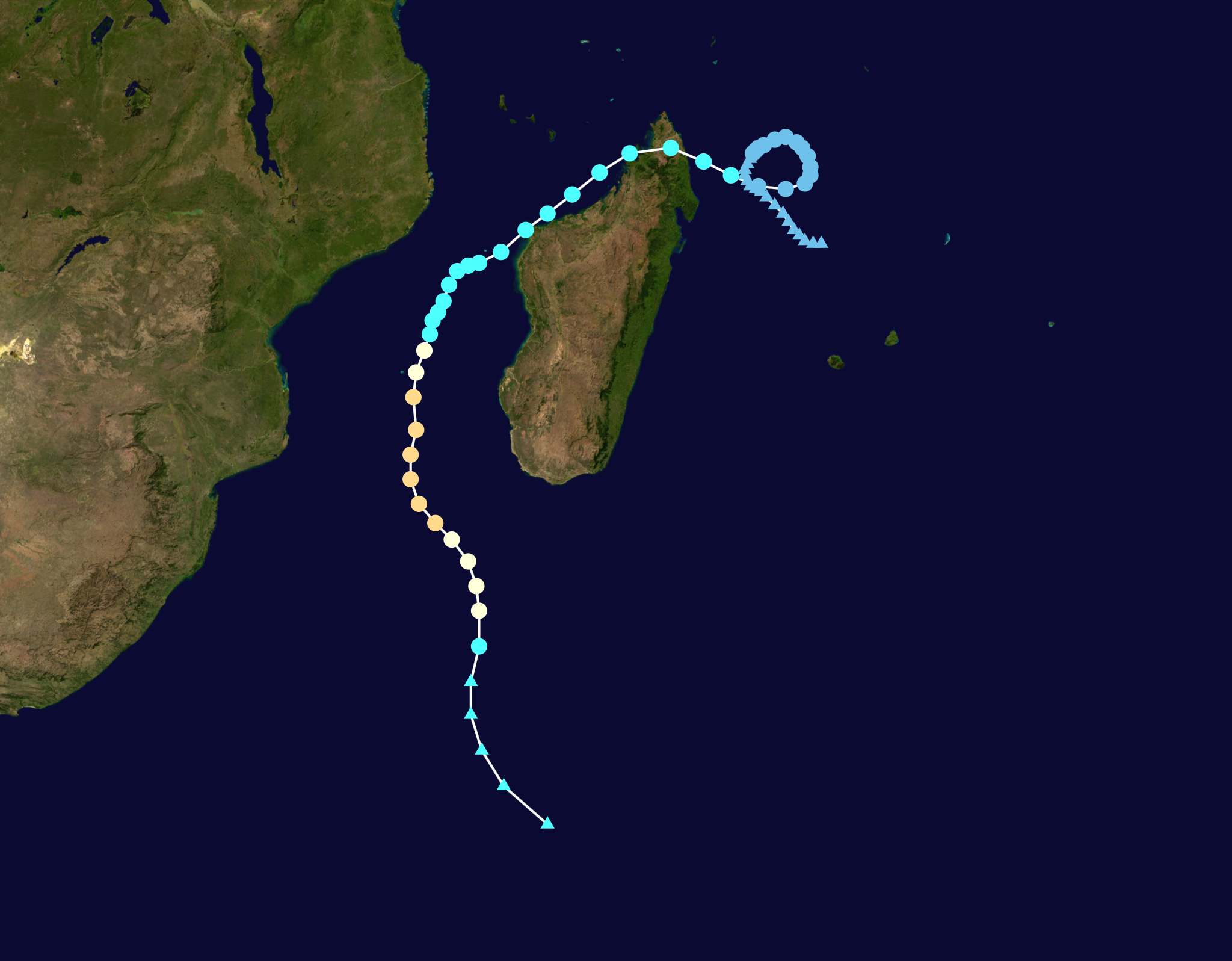
- Duration: February 5 – February 16
- Peak intensity: 140 km/h (85 mph) (10-min); 950 hPa (mbar)

In late January into early February, the ITCZ produced areas of convection around the northern tip of Madagascar. One such convective system spawned a low-pressure area between Tromelin island and Agaléga, which initially was still located within the ITCZ. On February 5, the system developed into a tropical depression, and failed to intensify further while executing a clockwise loop off northeastern Madagascar. After the convection increased, the depression intensified into a tropical storm on February 8 and was named Josie by the Meteorological Services of Madagascar. Subsequently, the storm moved across northern Madagascar and emerged into the Mozambique Channel on February 9 as a tropical depression, its structure deteriorated. Josie turned to the southwest around western Madagascar, and despite warm waters it initially failed to re-intensify much. On February 11, Josie re-attained tropical storm status, and subsequently turned to the south due to a broad area of low pressure in the region. The storm quickly intensified once moving far enough away from Madagascar, becoming a tropical cyclone on February 13 and soon after reaching peak 10–winds of 140 km/h (85 mph); in contrast, the JTWC estimated peak 1–minute winds of 165 km/h (105 mph). While near peak intensity, the eyewall of Josie passed over Europa Island. An approaching cold front turned the cyclone to the southeast, bringing the storm over cooler waters and causing weakening due to increased wind shear. On February 16, Josie became extratropical well to the south of Madagascar, and dissipated the next day.

In northwestern Madagascar, Josie dropped heavy rainfall and caused widespread flooding. Several towns were isolated, forcing residents to travel by boat. The storm heavily damaged crops in the region, particularly to vanilla. The rains caused rivers to exceed their banks, resulting in flooding up to 3.6 m (12 ft) deep. Nationwide, at least 36 people were killed due to Josie, although there were initial reports of 500 people missing. On Europa Island, Josie produced maximum sustained winds of 130 km/h (80 mph), with gusts to 222 km/h (138 mph), before blowing the anemometer away.

=== Severe Tropical Storm Karlette ===
- Severe tropical storm (MFR)
- Category 1 tropical cyclone (SSHWS)
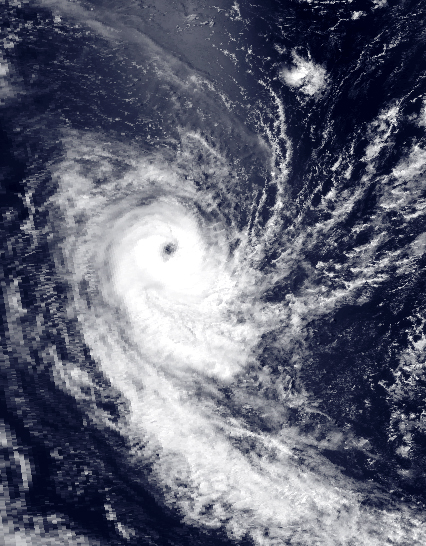
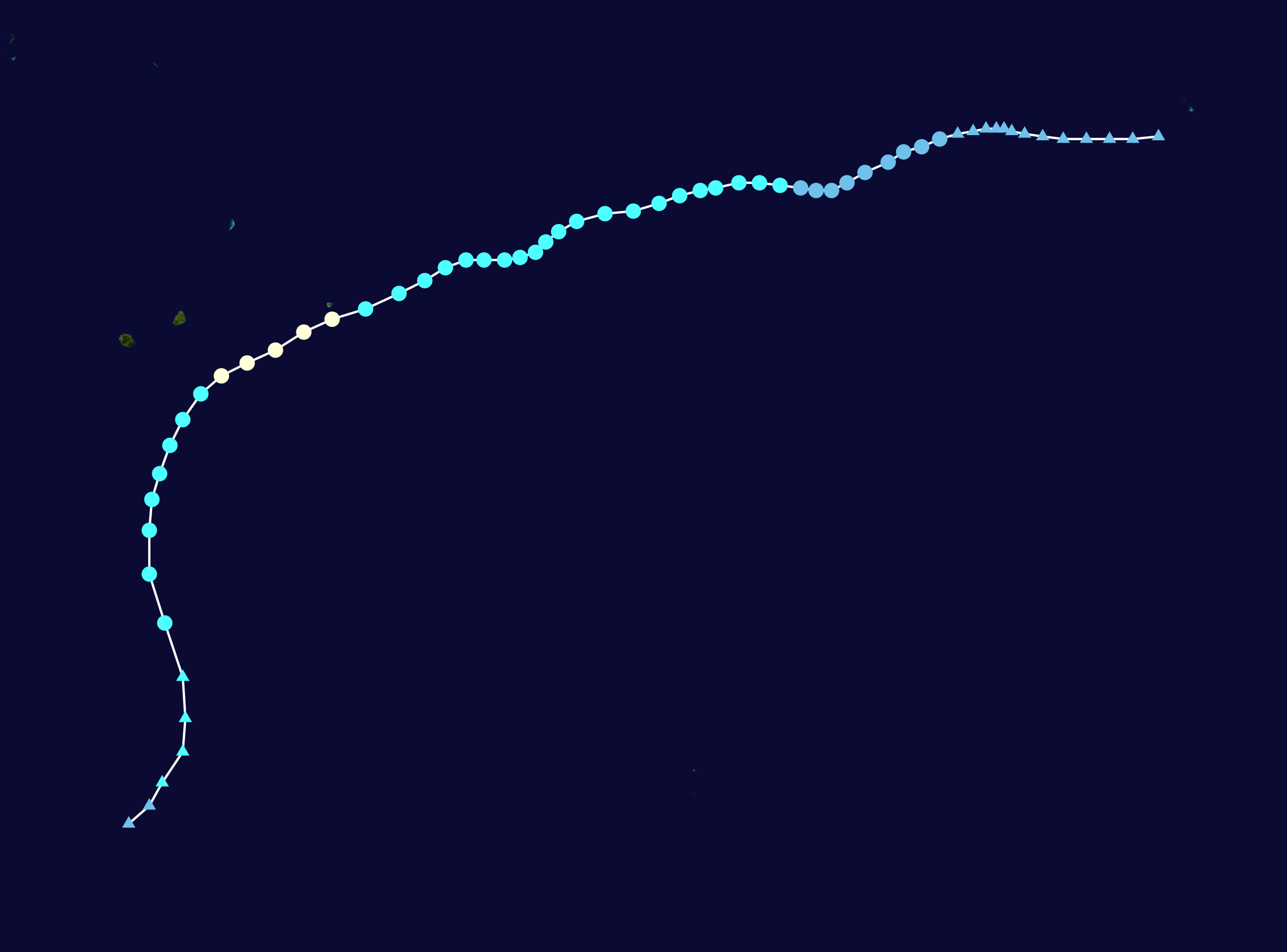
- Duration: February 14 – February 25
- Peak intensity: 110 km/h (70 mph) (10-min); 970 hPa (mbar)

An area of convection formed in the northeast portion of the basin, developing into a tropical disturbance on February 14. Despite the presence of easterly wind shear, the system slowly organized into Tropical Storm Karlette on February 16. By that time, the storm had a large and disorganized area of convection, which quickly weakened due to an increase in wind shear. Early on February 17, Karlette weakened to tropical depression status, although later that day re-attained tropical storm status after the shear diminished. The storm had been moving generally to the west-southwest due to a large ridge to the southeast. The storm's restrengthening was short-lived, as Karlette again weakened to tropical depression status on February 20, only to re-intensify into a tropical storm for the third time just six hours later. With the convection reorganizing, the storm developed an eye feature, indicative of the restrengthening. Late on February 21, Karlette passed about 70 km (45 mi) south of Rodrigues, where wind gusts remained below 110 km/h (68 mph); also on the island, the storm dropped beneficial rainfall totaling around 100 mm (3.9 in). Subsequently, Karlette attained peak 10–minute winds of 110 km/h (70 mph) on February 22, while the JTWC estimated 1–minute winds of 120 km/h (75 km/h). Passing well to the southeast of Mauritius, the storm curved more to the south due to an approaching trough, dissipating on February 25.

=== Severe Tropical Storm Lisette ===
- Severe tropical storm (MFR)
- Category 1 tropical cyclone (SSHWS)
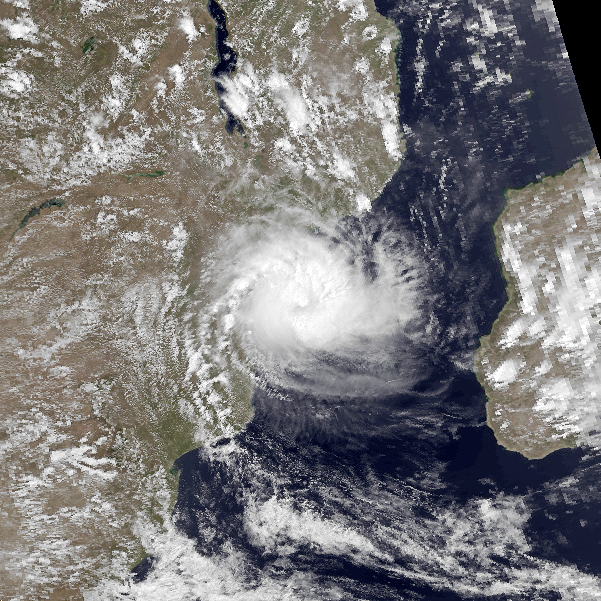
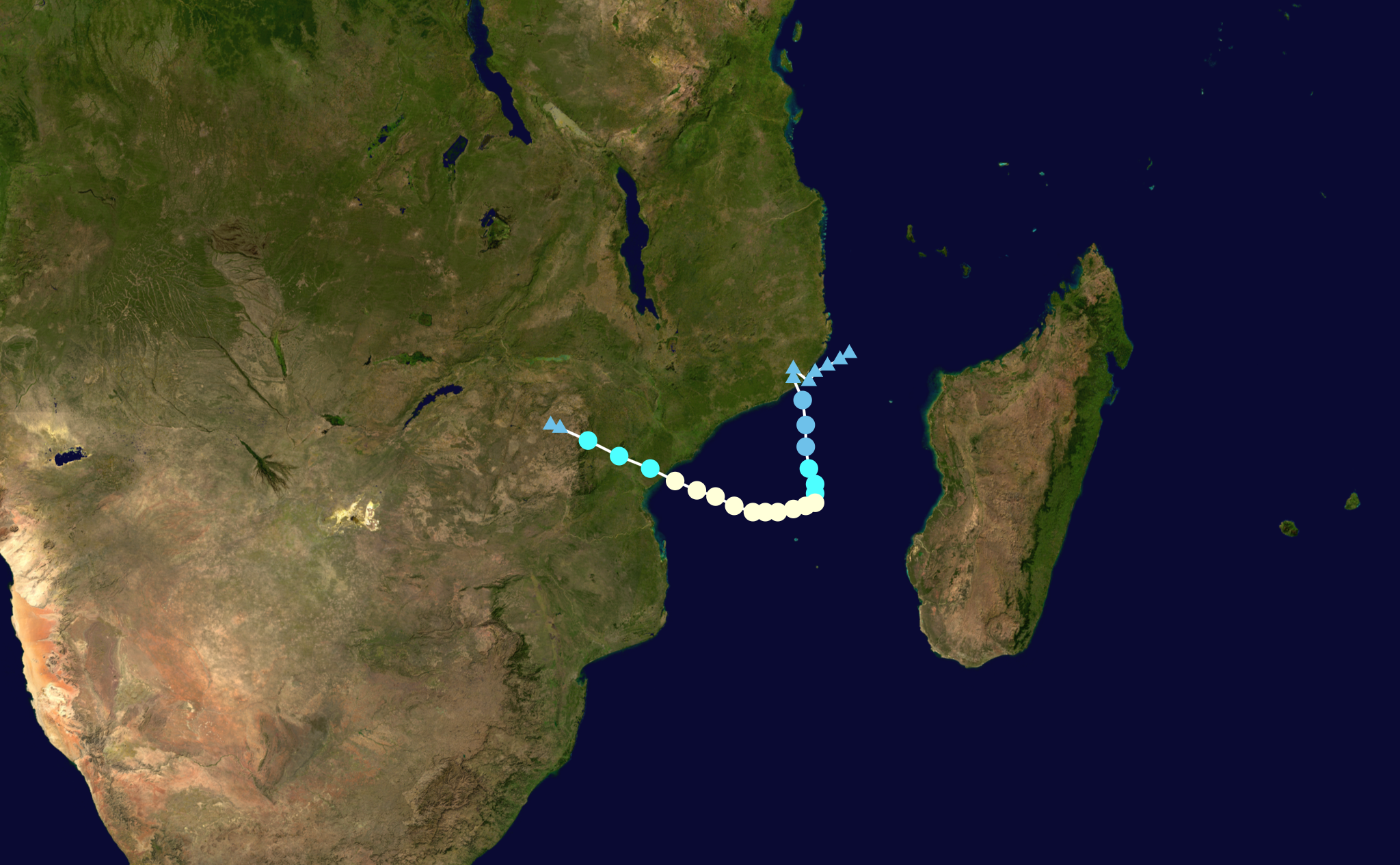
- Duration: February 24 – March 3
- Peak intensity: 95 km/h (60 mph) (10-min); 980 hPa (mbar)

Toward the end of February, the ITCZ spawned a system along the Mozambique coast. With a circulation and warm water temperatures, the system developed into a tropical disturbance on February 24 just offshore northeastern Mozambique. The system slowly organized while drifting southward between two ridges. After an increase in convection, the system intensified into Tropical Storm Lisette on February 28 according to the MFR, although by that time the JTWC had upgraded the storm to the equivalent of tropical cyclone status. A building ridge turned the storm sharply westward. On March 1, the MFR estimated peak 10–minute winds of 95 km/h (60 mph), making Lisette a severe tropical storm with an eye feature in the center. By comparison, the JTWC estimated peak 1–minute winds of 130 km/h (80 mph). The storm failed to intensify further, making landfall at peak intensity just north of Beira, Mozambique early on March 2. Lisette turned to the west-northwest, dissipating over Zimbabwe on March 3.

Lisette dropped heavy rainfall across the region it traversed, causing severe flooding in central and northern Mozambique. Most of the south-central Mozambique was drenched with rainfall totals ranging from 60 mm (2.4 in) to 200 mm (7.9 in), setting numerous records. Due to the precursor disturbance of Lisette, the Nampula Province in Mozambique was severely flooded by the storm, severely damaging several roads. Along the coast, the storm produced a wave height of about 4 m (13 ft) near Beira. Lisette and its resultant flooding destroyed 17,000 houses in Mozambique, affecting 300,000 people. Throughout the country, the cyclone killed 87 people.

=== Tropical Disturbance M1 (Rhonda) ===
- Tropical disturbance (MFR)
- Tropical storm (SSHWS)
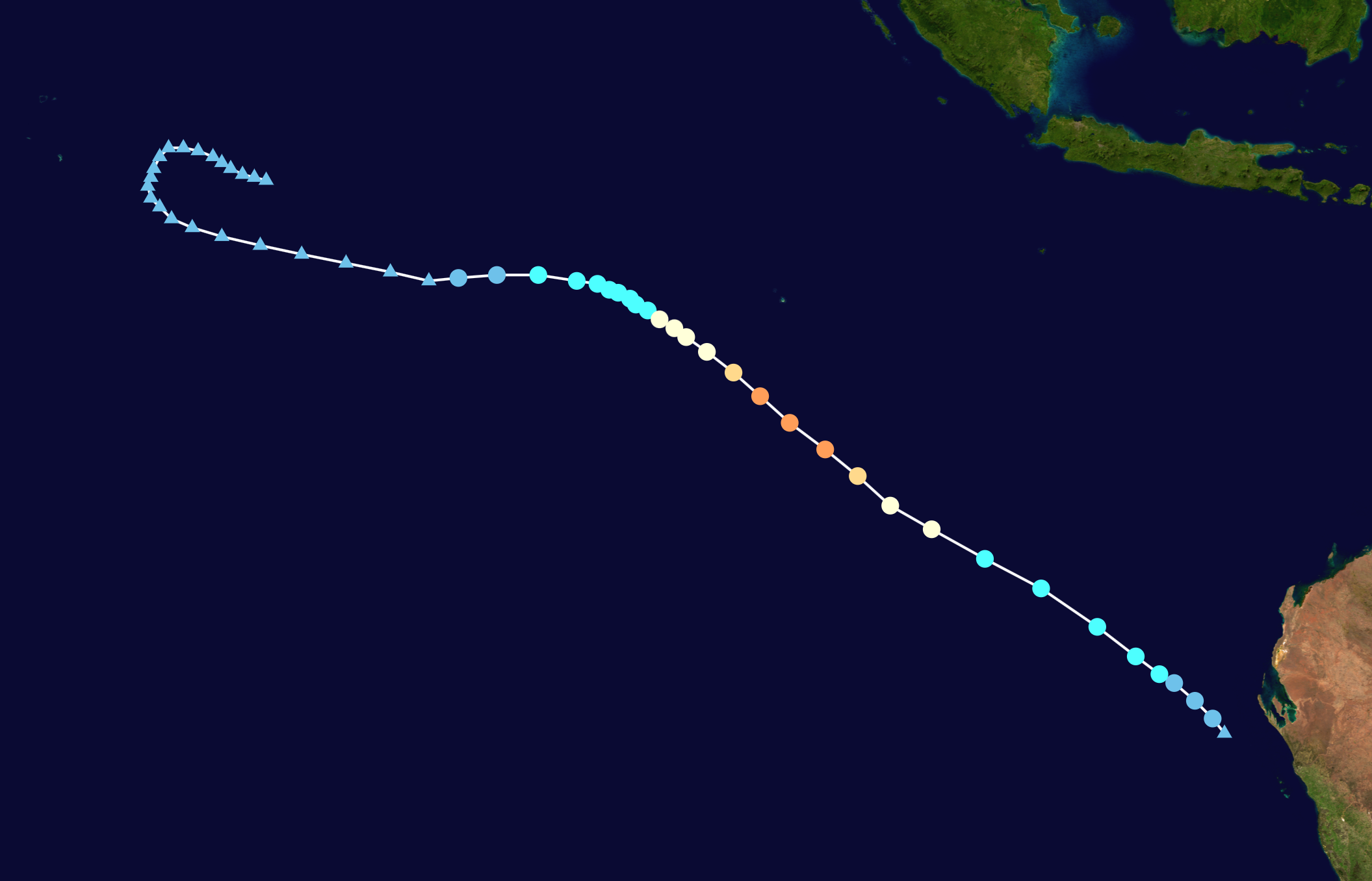
- Duration: May 9 – May 11 (exited basin)
- Peak intensity: 45 km/h (30 mph) (10-min); 995 hPa (mbar)

Early on May 9, a tropical depression formed in the eastern portion of the basin, with the MFR classifying the storm as Tropical Disturbance M1. The storm attained tropical storm status according to the JTWC, and peaked with a minimum pressure of 995 mb. The storm was later named Rhonda after crossing into the Australian Region.

=== Other systems ===
In addition to the named storms, the MFR tracked six tropical disturbances and one tropical depression throughout the year. Most were short lived, often receiving few warnings.

On January 3, the BoM and the JTWC ceased issuing advisories on Tropical Cyclone Phil in the Australian region, which previously moved over Western Australia. The system continued to the west, entering the south-west Indian Ocean on January 5. On January 8, the remnants of Phil slowed and turned to the southeast. The next day, the JTWC began reissuing advisories on Phil. The storm meandered and executed a small loop, and in the process reached peak 1–minute winds of 85 km/h (55 mph). Phil turned back to the southwest, and the JTWC ceased issuing advisories on January 12. Four days later, the circulation dissipated. Also in January, the JTWC briefly tracked Tropical Cyclone 18S from the Australian region, which entered the south-west Indian Ocean on January 12. At that time, the storm had peak 1–minute winds of 85 km/h (55 mph), although it quickly weakened and dissipated on January 13.

A tropical disturbance developed in late November, and two disturbances formed in the first few weeks of January. In the duration between when Iletta developed on January 23 and when Tropical Cyclone Josie formed on February 9, another two tropical disturbances formed, and the final two developed after Lisette originated in late February. The final disturbance of the season originated from a persistent area of convection near the equator on July 19, northeast of Diego Garcia. With warm enough water temperatures, the system developed further, becoming Tropical Depression M2 on July 20, the first July depression since 1971. That day, the JTWC classified the storm as Tropical Cyclone 01S. As the JTWC considers the tropical cyclone year to begin on July 1, and the MFR considered it beginning on August 1 at the time, the storm was in different cyclone years in different agencies. Estimates from the Dvorak technique suggested that the system approached tropical storm status on July 21 after a central dense overcast formed, although the MFR only estimated peak 10–minute winds of 55 km/h (35 mph). Moving southwestward and later to the west, the depression began weakening due to wind shear on July 23, and dissipated two days later. At the time, July was within the annual tropical cyclone year, although a change in policy shifted the end of the tropical cyclone year to June 30, beginning in 2002.

== Storm names ==
Within the South-West Indian Ocean basin, tropical systems that attain 10-minute sustained windspeeds of 65 km/h, (40 mph) are assigned a name by the Regional Specialized Meteorological Centre on Réunion (RSMC La Réunion). Systems that move into this region from the Australian region are given a second name by Météo-France. New naming lists are used every year so a name is normally used only once, thus no names are retired.

- Antoinette
- Bellamine
- Chantelle
- Daniella
- Elvina
- Fabriola
- Gretelle
- Helinda
- Iletta
- Josie
- Karlette
- Lisette
- Maryse (unused)
- Nelda (unused)
- Ocline (unused)
- Phyllis (unused)
- Rolina (unused)
- Sheryl (unused)
- Thelma (unused)
- Venyda (unused)
- Wiltina (unused)
- Yolette (unused)

== See also ==
- Atlantic hurricane seasons: 1996, 1997
- Pacific hurricane seasons: 1996, 1997
- Pacific typhoon seasons: 1996, 1997
- North Indian Ocean cyclone seasons: 1996, 1997
