= Andranolalina =

- Location in Madagascar
- Coordinates: 23°30′50″S 46°58′55″E
- Country: Madagascar
- Region: Atsimo-Atsinanana
- District: Midongy-Atsimo
- Time zone: UTC3 (EAT)
- Postal code: 318

Andranolalina is a town and commune in Madagascar. It belongs to the district of Midongy-Atsimo, which is a part of Atsimo-Atsinanana Region. There are 1534 inscribed electors in this commune.

Main town is Andranolalina but the commune also covers the neighboring villages of:

- Ampatramary
- Mahasoa Analatelo
- Haramanga
- Ambararata, Andranolalina
- Anevandava
- Ampatranila
- Antanambao, Andranolalina
- Antanandava, Andranolalina
