= Ankazovelo =

- Location in Madagascar
- Coordinates: 23°37′59″S 47°00′00″E
- Country: Madagascar
- Region: Anosy
- District: Midongy-Sud
- Time zone: UTC3 (EAT)
- Postal code: 318

Ankazovelo is a town and commune in Madagascar. It belongs to the district of Midongy-Atsimo, which is a part of Atsimo-Atsinanana Region. There are 1602 inscribed voters in this commune.

Main town is Ankazovelo but the commune also covers the neighboring villages of:

- Ambasohihy
- Ampasy
- Ankazomanga
- Bemahala
- Mahazoarivo
- Nanatotsikora
- Telorano
- Voanana
