= Marovitsika Sud =

Marovitsika Sud Marovitsika
- Location in Madagascar
- Coordinates: 24°01′17″S 46°58′07″E
- Country: Madagascar
- Region: Atsimo-Atsinanana
- District: Befotaka Sud District
- Elevation: 935 m (3,068 ft)
- Time zone: UTC3 (EAT)
- Postal code: 307

Marovitsika Sud is a commune in Atsimo-Atsinanana Region in south-eastern Madagascar.

Following 8 villages belong to the commune:

- Amboraka
- Ankazolahy
- Atokoboritelo
- Belenalena sud
- Ezira
- Mahasoa
- Marovitsika
- Mihaikarivo
