= Bulbophyllum multivaginatum =

Scientific classification
- Kingdom: Plantae
- Clade: Tracheophytes
- Clade: Angiosperms
- Clade: Monocots
- Order: Asparagales
- Family: Orchidaceae
- Subfamily: Epidendroideae
- Genus: Bulbophyllum
- Species: B. multivaginatum

Binomial name
- Bulbophyllum multivaginatum Jum. & H.Perrier

Species of orchid

Bulbophyllum multivaginatum is a species of orchid in the genus Bulbophyllum found in Madagascar.
