= Manombo =

For the town in Atsimo-Andrefana Region in Madagascar, see Manombo Sud

Manombo is a village of the commune of Nosifeno in the district of Midongy-Atsimo in the region of Atsimo-Atsinanana in south-eastern Madagascar. It is also the name of a nearby river that flows along a semi-arid areas with many coastal dunes.

== See also ==
- Manombo Special Reserve
