= Befotaka =

Befotaka Befotaka Atsimo Befotaka Sud
- Location in Madagascar
- Coordinates: 23°49′30″S 46°58′44″E
- Country: Madagascar
- Region: Atsimo-Atsinanana
- District: Befotaka Sud District
- Elevation: 779 m (2,556 ft)
- Time zone: UTC3 (EAT)
- Postal code: 307

Befotaka is a town in Atsimo-Atsinanana Region in south-eastern Madagascar. It is situated near the Itomampy river.

From the coast and Vangaindrano it can be reached by the unpaved, secondary road RN T18 of 94 km in very bad state of conservation to Nosifeno (formerly: Midongy Sud), to continue on another secondary road of 42 km to Befotaka.

== Nature ==
It is the gateway to the Midongy du sud National Park (also called: Midongy-Betroka National Park) that is found in a distance of 34 km.

== Administration ==
To the commune of Befotaka also belong the following villages:

- Ambohimasoa
- Ambondr
- Andasy
- Andioteny
- Andranovory, Befotaka
- Andria, Befotaka
- Ankazovelo, Befotaka
- Bekofafa
- Belenalena
- Morarano
- Soabonaka
- Soavariana
- Soarano
