= Beharena =

- Location in Madagascar
- Coordinates: 23°31′06″S 47°04′00″E
- Country: Madagascar
- Region: Atsimo-Atsinanana
- District: Befotaka Sud District
- Elevation: 590 m (1,940 ft)
- Time zone: UTC3 (EAT)
- Postal code: 307

Beharena is a commune in Atsimo-Atsinanana Region in south-eastern Madagascar.

Following 6 villages belong to the commune:

- Akira
- Ankarapotsy
- Beharena
- Efasy
- Ianakody
- Mahabo
