= Bulbophyllum septatum =

Scientific classification
- Kingdom: Plantae
- Clade: Tracheophytes
- Clade: Angiosperms
- Clade: Monocots
- Order: Asparagales
- Family: Orchidaceae
- Subfamily: Epidendroideae
- Genus: Bulbophyllum
- Species: B. septatum

Binomial name
- Bulbophyllum septatum Schltr.

Synonyms
- Bulbophyllum serratum H.Perrier 1937

Species of orchid

Bulbophyllum septatum is a species of orchid in the genus Bulbophyllum found in Madagascar.
