= Midongy-Atsimo District =

Midongy Atsimo or Midongy Sud is a district in the region of Atsimo-Atsinanana in Madagascar.

== Communes ==
The district is further divided into six communes:

- Andranolalina
  - Ampatramary
  - Mahasoa Analatelo
  - Haramanga
  - Ambararata, Andranolalina
  - Anevandava
  - Ampatranila
  - Antanambao, Andranolalina
  - Antanandava, Andranolalina
- Ankazovelo
  - Ambasohihy
  - Ampasy
  - Ankazomanga
  - Bemahala
  - Mahazoarivo
  - Nanatotsikora
  - Telorano
  - Voanana
- Ivondro
  - Ampasy
  - Analaiva, Ivondro
  - Ankarindro
  - Benonoka
  - Lavaraty
  - Mahazoarivo
  - Makojano
  - Sahatsoro
- Nosifeno
  - Amboniasy
  - Ankarinoro, Nosifeno
  - Beharena, Nosifeno
  - Bekofafa
  - Manombo
  - Maroangaty
  - Milahila
  - Morondava, Nosifeno
  - Nanarena
  - Vohimanoro
- Soakibany
  - Amboangy
  - Ambodijoho
  - Anezandava Est
  - Antaramiery
  - Bearaotra
  - Fasikendry
  - Mahasoa, Soakibany
- Zara Maliorano
  - Ambodisahy
  - Ankalatany
  - Beharena, Zara
  - Bevaho
  - Mahabe, Zara
  - Marovovo
  - Mikaiky
  - Sahanety
  - Tsararano, Zara

== Nature ==
Most of the area of the Midongy du sud National Park is situated on the territory of this district.
