= Nosifeno =

Nosifeno Midongy Sud
- Location in Madagascar
- Coordinates: 23°35′S 47°01′E
- Country: Madagascar
- Region: Atsimo-Atsinanana
- District: Midongy-Atsimo
- Elevation: 568 m (1,864 ft)
- Time zone: UTC3 (EAT)
- Postal code: 318

Nosifeno (former name: Midongy Sud) is a town and commune in Madagascar. It belongs to the district of Midongy-Atsimo, which is a part of Atsimo-Atsinanana Region. There are 3881 inscribed voters in this commune. It is located at the Itomampy river. From the coast and Vangaindrano it can be reached by the unpaved, secondary road T18 of 94 km in very bad state of conservation.

To this commune belong also the villages of:

- Amboniasy
- Ankarinoro, Nosifeno
- Beharena, Nosifeno
- Bekofafa
- Manombo
- Maroangaty
- Milahila
- Morondava, Nosifeno
- Nanarena
- Vohimanoro
