= List of storms named Neneng =

The name Neneng has been used for fifteen tropical cyclones in the Philippine Area of Responsibility by PAGASA and its predecessor, the Philippine Weather Bureau, in the Western Pacific Ocean.

- Typhoon Faye (1963) (T6313, 28W, Neneng) – a long-tracked Category 3-equivalent typhoon which struck Hong Kong, killing 3 people.
- Tropical Depression Neneng (1967) – a weak system only tracked by the Philippine Weather Bureau.
- Typhoon Harriet (1971) (T7112, 12W, Neneng) – traversed the Philippines and made landfall near the demilitarized zone between North and South Vietnam as a Category 4-equivalent typhoon, causing at least 5 fatalities and rendering 14 others as missing.
- Typhoon Flossie (1975) (T7516, 19W, Neneng) – a Category 1-equivalent typhoon which caused the sinking of two freighters, claiming 44 lives.
- Typhoon Judy (1979) (T7911, 13W, Neneng) – an intense typhoon which struck China and South Korea, leading to the deaths of 111 people.
- Tropical Storm Herbert (1983) (T8312, 13W, Neneng) – a tropical storm which struck Vietnam, resulting to 40 fatalities.
- Typhoon Gerald (1987) (T8714, 14W, Neneng) – deadly typhoon which approached Taiwan and struck China, killing 127.
- Typhoon Kinna (1991) (T9117, 19W, Neneng) – relatively strong mid-season typhoon that struck western Japan, leading to the loss of 11 lives.
- Typhoon Ward (1995) (T9518, 26W, Neneng) – a powerful typhoon which stayed at sea.
- Severe Tropical Storm York (1999) (T9915, 21W, Neneng) – struck China and Hong Kong, becoming the strongest storm to affect the latter in 16 years.

Preceded by Mameng	Pacific typhoon season names Neneng	Succeeded by Oniang

- Severe Tropical Storm Bebinca (2006) (T0616, 19W, Neneng) – a relatively strong tropical storm which initially did not affect land but claimed the lives of 33 people off the coast of Honshu after becoming an extratropical low.
- Typhoon Phanfone (2014) (T1418, 18W, Neneng) – a strong typhoon which struck Japan, killing 11.
- Tropical Storm Barijat (2018) (2018) (T1823, 27W, Neneng) – a tropical storm which affected northern Philippines and southern China.
- Typhoon Nesat (2022) (T2220, 23W, Neneng) – a typhoon which affected the Philippines, Taiwan, and Vietnam.
- Tropical Storm Gaenari (2026) (T2620, Neneng) – a weak system that lingered near Taiwan and Ryukyu Islands.

Preceded by Maymay	Pacific typhoon season names Neneng	Succeeded by Obet
