= List of storms named Oniang =

The name Oniang has been used to name ten tropical cyclones within the Philippine Area of Responsibility by the PAGASA and its predecessor, the Philippine Weather Bureau.

- Typhoon Gloria (1963) (T6314, 29W, Oniang) – a Category 4 typhoon that impacted Taiwan and China causing 239 fatalities with 89 missing.
- Tropical Storm Iris (1967) (T6716, 18W, Oniang) – struck southern China.
- Tropical Storm Kim (1971) (T7115, 14W, Oniang) – made landfall on Vietnam.
- Tropical Storm Grace (1975) (T7517 20W, Oniang) – had no significant effects on land.
- Tropical Storm Ken (1979) (T7912, 15W, Oniang) – struck Japan.
- Tropical Storm Ida (1983) (T8313, 14W, Oniang) – a Category 1 typhoon that did not significantly impact land.
- Typhoon Kelly (1987) (T8721, 20W, Oniang) – a Category 2 typhoon that caused 9 deaths and $365.6 million (1987 USD) in damages when it made landfall on Japan.
- Typhoon Nat (1991) (T9120, 22W, Oniang) – a Category 3 typhoon that traveled in an erratic path before striking Taiwan and southern China.
- Tropical Storm Yvette (1995) (T9527, 27W, Oniang) – made landfall on Vietnam and the Philippines.
- Typhoon Bart (1999) (T9918, 24W, Oniang) – a Category 5-equivalent super typhoon that struck Japan, causing 36 deaths and $5.75 billion (1999 USD) in damages.

After the 2000 Pacific typhoon season, the PAGASA revised their naming lists, and the name Oniang was excluded.

Preceded by Neneng	Pacific typhoon season names Oniang	Succeeded by Pepang
