= List of storms named Pepang =

The name Pepang has been used for ten tropical cyclones in the Philippine Area of Responsibility in the West Pacific Ocean:

- Tropical Storm Hester (1963) (T6315, 30W, Pepang)
- Typhoon Kate (1967) (T6719, 21W, Pepang)
- Typhoon Jean (1971) (T7114, 16W, Pepang)
- Tropical Storm Helen (1975) (T7518, 21W, Pepang) – hit the Philippines and Vietnam
- Typhoon Mac (1979) (T7914, 27W, Pepang) – crossed southern Luzon and then made landfall near Hong Kong
- Tropical Storm Joe (1983) (T8314, 15W, Pepang)
- Typhoon Lynn (1987) (T8720, 27W, Pepang) – responsible for severe flooding in Taiwan
- Tropical Storm Luke (1991) (T9118, 20W, Pepang) – short-lived storm that brushed Japan
- Typhoon Zack (1995) (T9521, 28W, Pepang) – a Category 4 typhoon that crossed the central Philippines and then made landfall on eastern Vietnam, causing 110 deaths
- Typhoon Dan (1999) (T9920, 26W, Pepang) – a Category 3 typhoon that hit northern Luzon then eastern China
