= List of storms named Mameng =

The name Mameng has been used to name 10 tropical cyclones within the Philippine Area of Responsibility by the PAGASA and its predecessor, the Philippine Weather Bureau, in the Western Pacific Ocean.

- Tropical Depression Mameng (1963)
- Tropical Storm Fran (1967) (T6712, 14W, Mameng) – struck southern China.
- Typhoon Gilda (1971) (T7111, 11W, Mameng) – traversed the Philippines and struck southern China.
- Typhoon Elsie (1975) (T7514, 17W, Mameng) – affected Hong Kong and southern China.
- Typhoon Irving (1979) (T7910, 12W, Mameng) – struck the Korean Peninsula as a tropical storm.
- Tropical Depression Mameng (1983)
- Tropical Depression Mameng (1987) – affected Vietnam
- Typhoon Ellie (1991) (T9110, 11W, Mameng) – a small typhoon that affected Taiwan and China.
- Tropical Storm Sibyl (1995) (T9515, 20W, Mameng) – crossed the Philippines and hit southern China.
- Tropical Storm Wendy (1999) (T9921, 20W, Mameng) – a weak tropical storm that caused 133 deaths and $309.4 million (1999 USD) in damages.

After the 2000 Pacific typhoon season, the PAGASA revised their naming lists and the name Mameng was excluded.

Preceded by Luding	Pacific typhoon season names Mameng	Succeeded by Neneng
