= List of storms named Obet =

The name Obet has been used for two tropical cyclones in the Philippine Area of Responsibility by PAGASA in the Western Pacific Ocean. The name replaced Ompong after it was retired due to the effects of a destructive typhoon in 2018.

- Tropical Depression Obet (2022) (25W) – a weak tropical depression that indirectly caused 2 fatalities
- Typhoon Saudel (2026) (T2618, 17W, Obet) – a Category 4 typhoon that affected Japan, China, and Taiwan which was one of the longest-lived typhoons on record.

Preceded by Neneng	Pacific typhoon season names Obet	Succeeded by Pilandok
