= 1975 Pacific typhoon season =

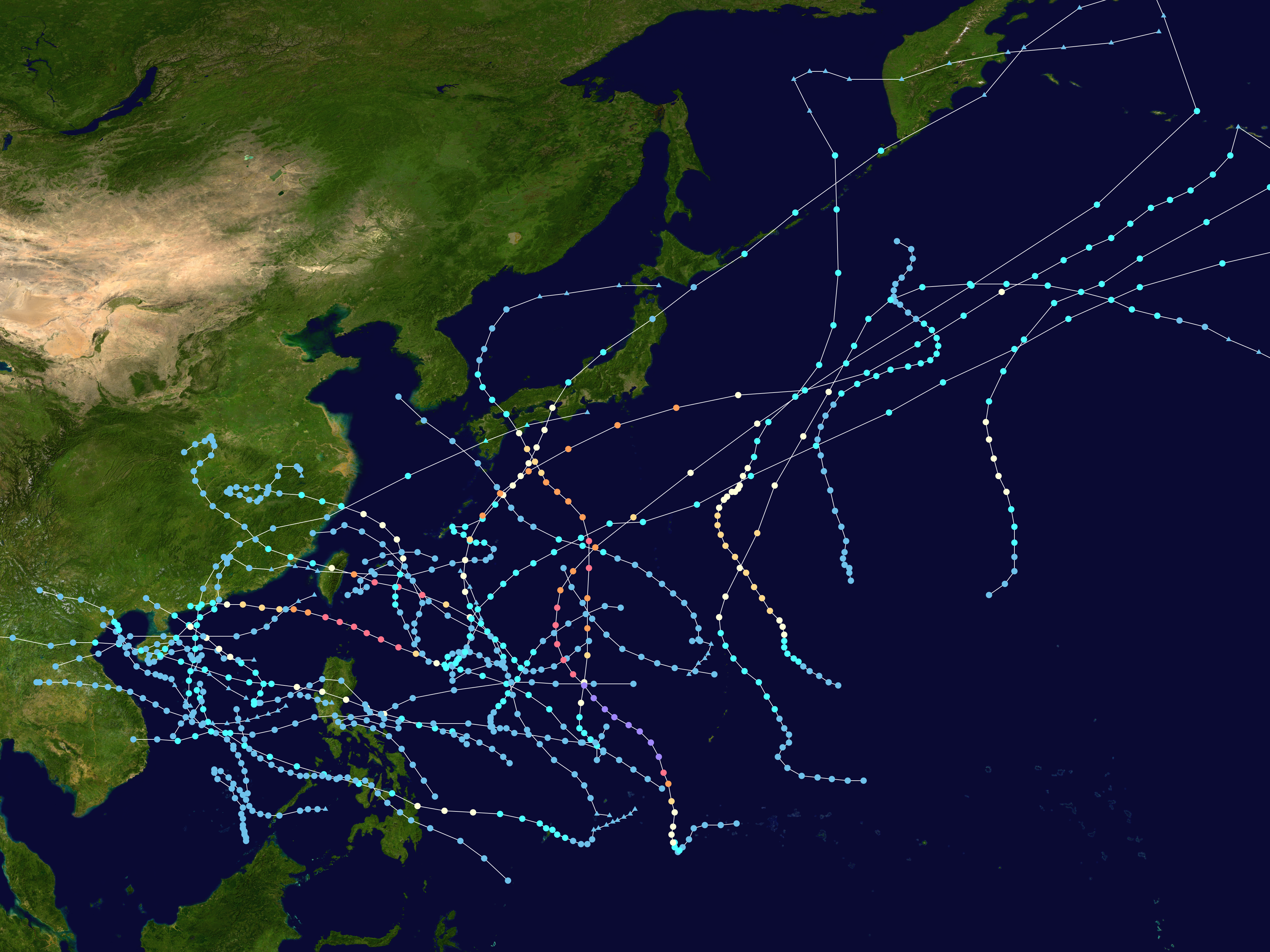
- Season summary map

Seasonal boundaries
- First system formed: January 20, 1975
- Last system dissipated: December 30, 1975

Strongest storm
- Name: June
  - Maximum winds: 295 km/h (185 mph) (1-minute sustained)
  - Lowest pressure: 875 hPa (mbar)

Seasonal statistics
- Total depressions: 39
- Total storms: 21
- Typhoons: 14
- Total fatalities: >229,166 (Deadliest Pacific typhoon season on record)
- Total damage: > $1.35 billion (1975 USD)

Related articles
- 1975 Atlantic hurricane season; 1975 Pacific hurricane season; 1975 North Indian Ocean cyclone season

The 1975 Pacific typhoon season was one of the deadliest tropical cyclone seasons on record, with nearly 229,000 fatalities occurring during the season. Despite this, it was one of the least active on record, with only 21 named storms forming throughout the year. It had no official bounds; it ran year-round in 1975, but most tropical cyclones tend to form in the northwestern Pacific Ocean between June and December. These dates conventionally delimit the period of each year when most tropical cyclones form in the northwestern Pacific Ocean.

Tropical Storms formed in the entire west pacific basin were assigned a name by the Joint Typhoon Warning Center. Tropical depressions in this basin have the "W" suffix added to their number. Tropical depressions that enter or form in the Philippine area of responsibility are assigned a name by the Philippine Atmospheric, Geophysical and Astronomical Services Administration or PAGASA. This can often result in the same storm having two names.

Some of the notable storms here are Typhoon Nina, which caused the Banqiao Dam flood, which resulted in approximately 126,000 people dead, and Typhoon June, which was the strongest storm on record with a pressure of 875 mbar, until beaten by Typhoon Tip in 1979 with 870 mbar.

== Seasonal summary ==
25 tropical depressions formed this year in the Western Pacific, of which 20 became tropical storms. 14 storms reached typhoon intensity, of which 3 reached super typhoon strength.

== Systems ==
=== Typhoon Lola (Auring) ===
- Typhoon (JMA)
- Category 1 typhoon (SSHWS)
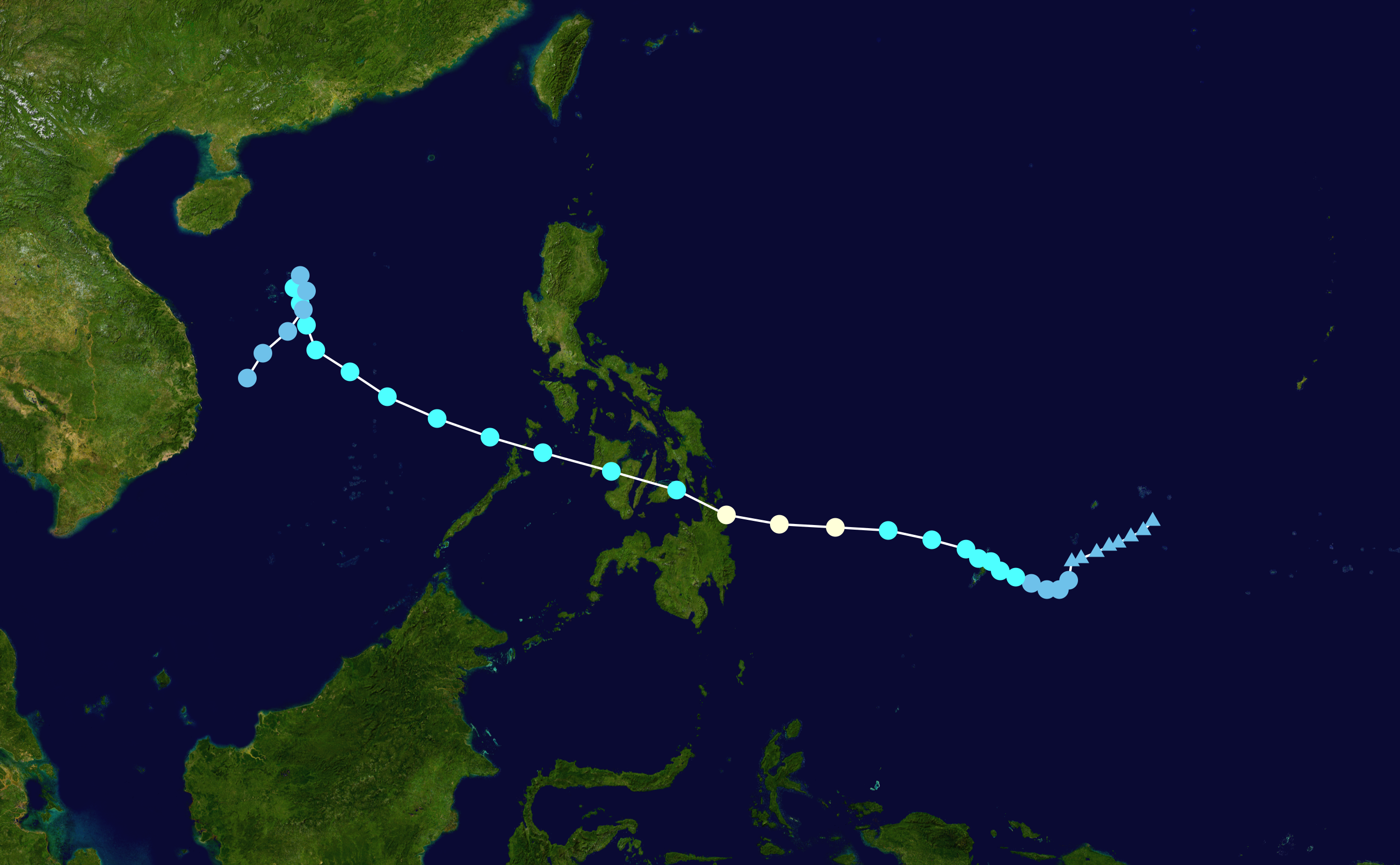
- Duration: January 20 – January 28
- Peak intensity: 130 km/h (80 mph) (1-min); 975 hPa (mbar)

Typhoon Lola (Auring) was a very early typhoon. It made landfall on Mindanao as a minimal typhoon on January 24 and transversed the southern Philippines as a tropical storm. Lola crossed the South China Sea before stalling in the open sea and dissipating on January 28. The typhoon caused 30 casualties from mudslides and heavy rain.

=== Tropical Depression 02W ===
- Tropical depression (JMA)
- Tropical depression (SSHWS)
- Duration: April 22 – April 28
- Peak intensity: 45 km/h (30 mph) (1-min); 1004 hPa (mbar)

Tropical Depression 02W formed over the Philippines and crossed them before dissipating over the South China Sea.

=== Tropical Storm Mamie ===
- Tropical storm (JMA)
- Tropical storm (SSHWS)
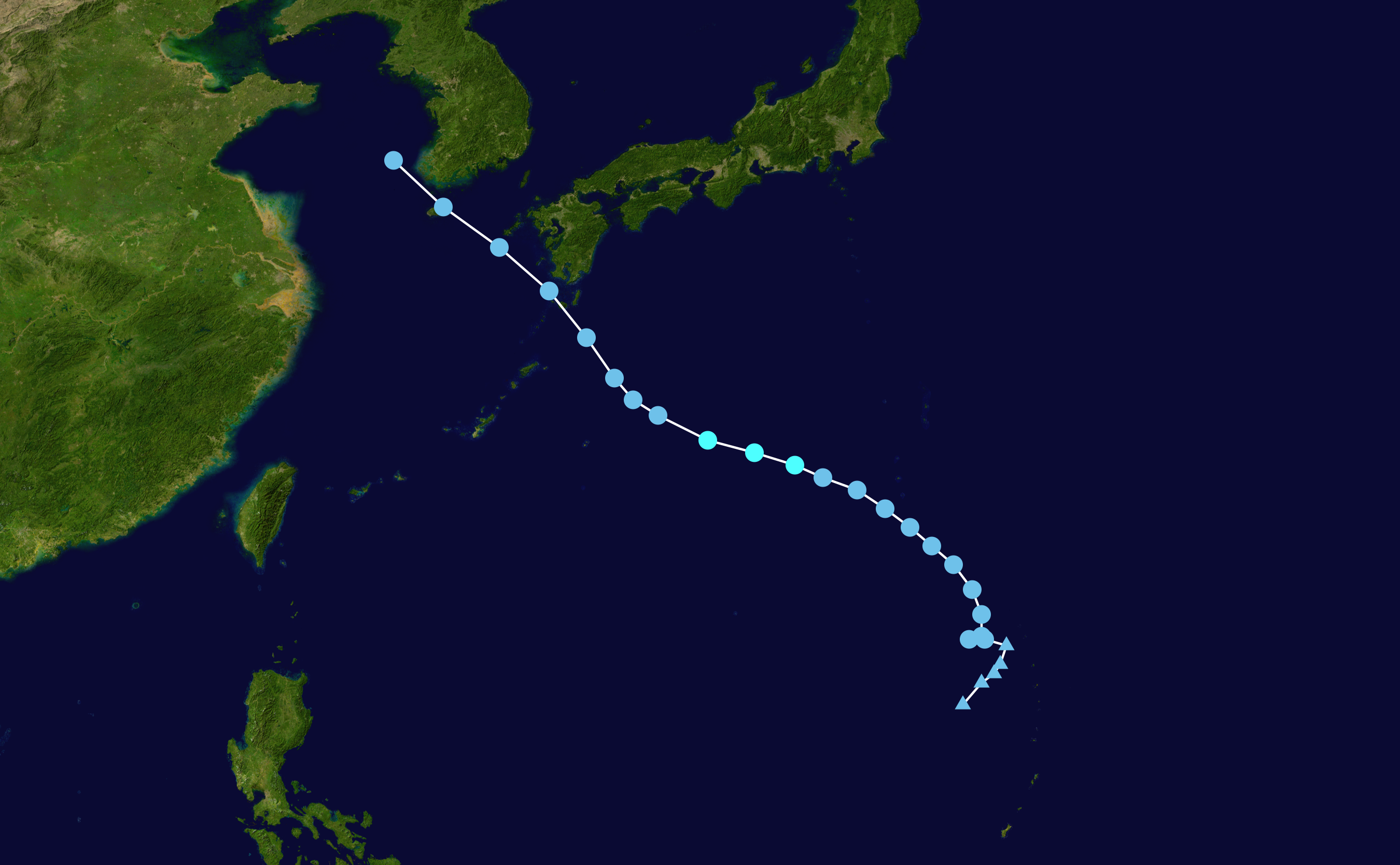
- Duration: July 24 – July 30
- Peak intensity: 75 km/h (45 mph) (1-min); 992 hPa (mbar)

Tropical Storm Mamie formed north of Guam, and briefly attained tropical storm status before weakening. It then passed south of Japan as a tropical depression before dissipating just south of Korea.

=== Super Typhoon Nina (Bebeng) ===
- Typhoon (JMA)
- Category 4 super typhoon (SSHWS)
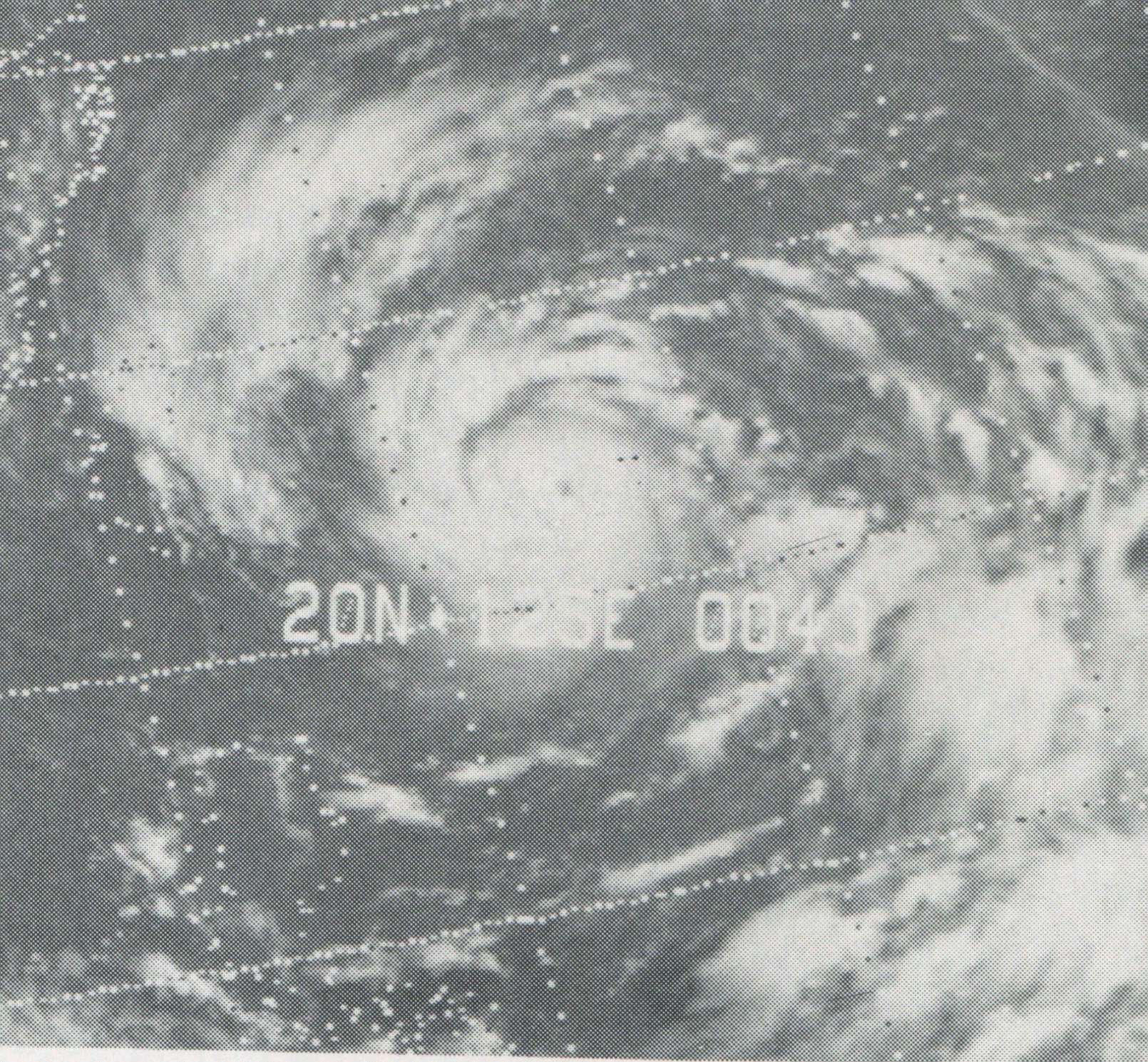
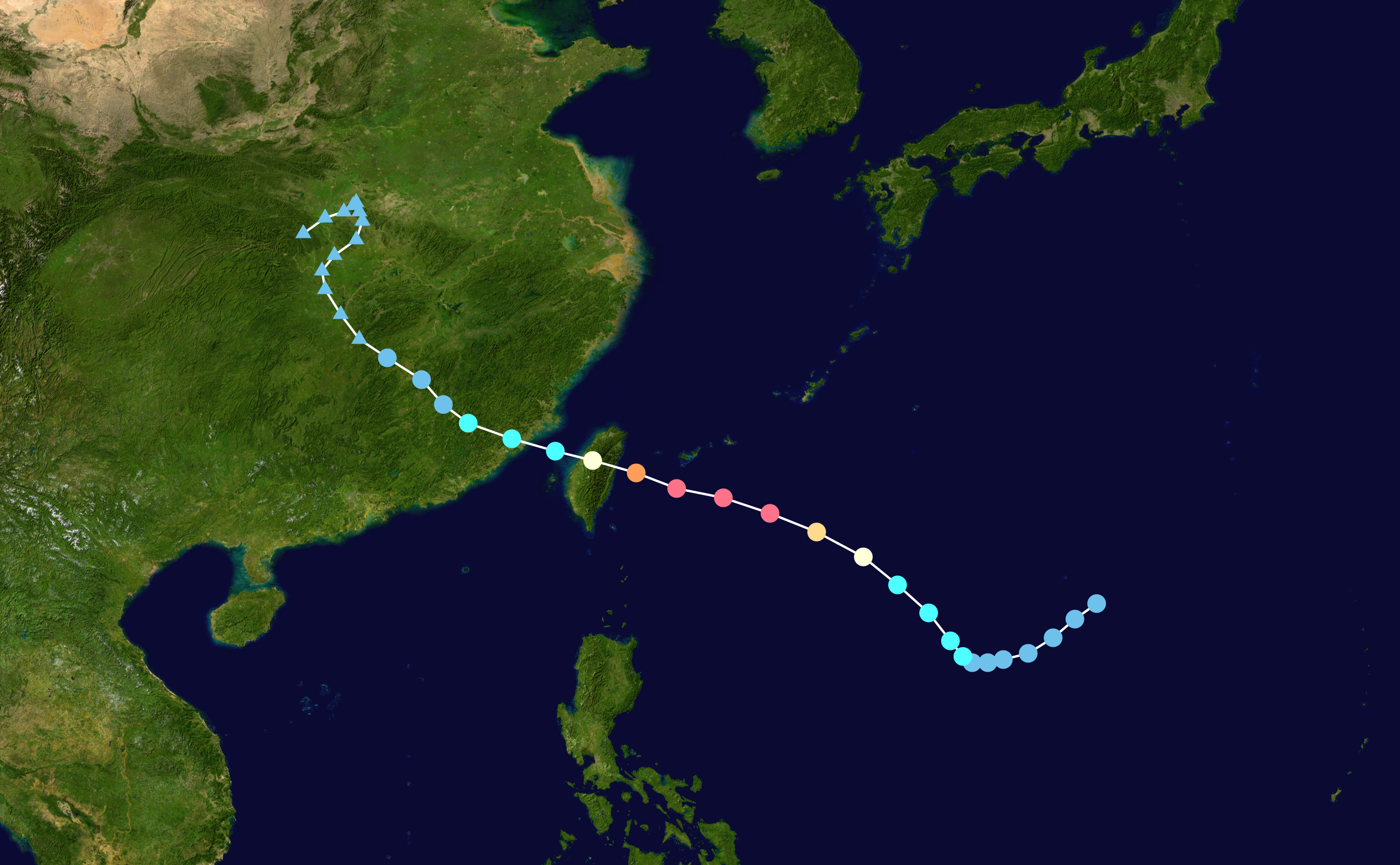
- Duration: July 30 – August 5
- Peak intensity: 250 km/h (155 mph) (1-min); 900 hPa (mbar)

Nina was a short-lived but rapidly intensifying typhoon. After forming on July 30, it struck Taiwan at category 3 typhoon intensity. It stayed a typhoon during its passage over the island, causing 25 fatalities and widespread damage. It emerged into the Formosa Strait and weakened to a tropical storm. Nina headed inland. Its moisture interacted with a cold front, causing a huge amount of rainfall. The rainfall contributed to the bursting of the Banqiao Dam, causing the deaths of at least 229,000 people.

=== Tropical Depression 05W (Karing) ===
- Tropical depression (JMA)
- Tropical depression (SSHWS)
- Duration: August 4 – August 7
- Peak intensity: 55 km/h (35 mph) (1-min); 998 hPa (mbar)

Tropical Depression 05W (Karing) formed east-northeast of the Philippines and traveled north then northwest before dissipating off the coast of China.

=== Typhoon Ora (Diding) ===
- Typhoon (JMA)
- Category 1 typhoon (SSHWS)
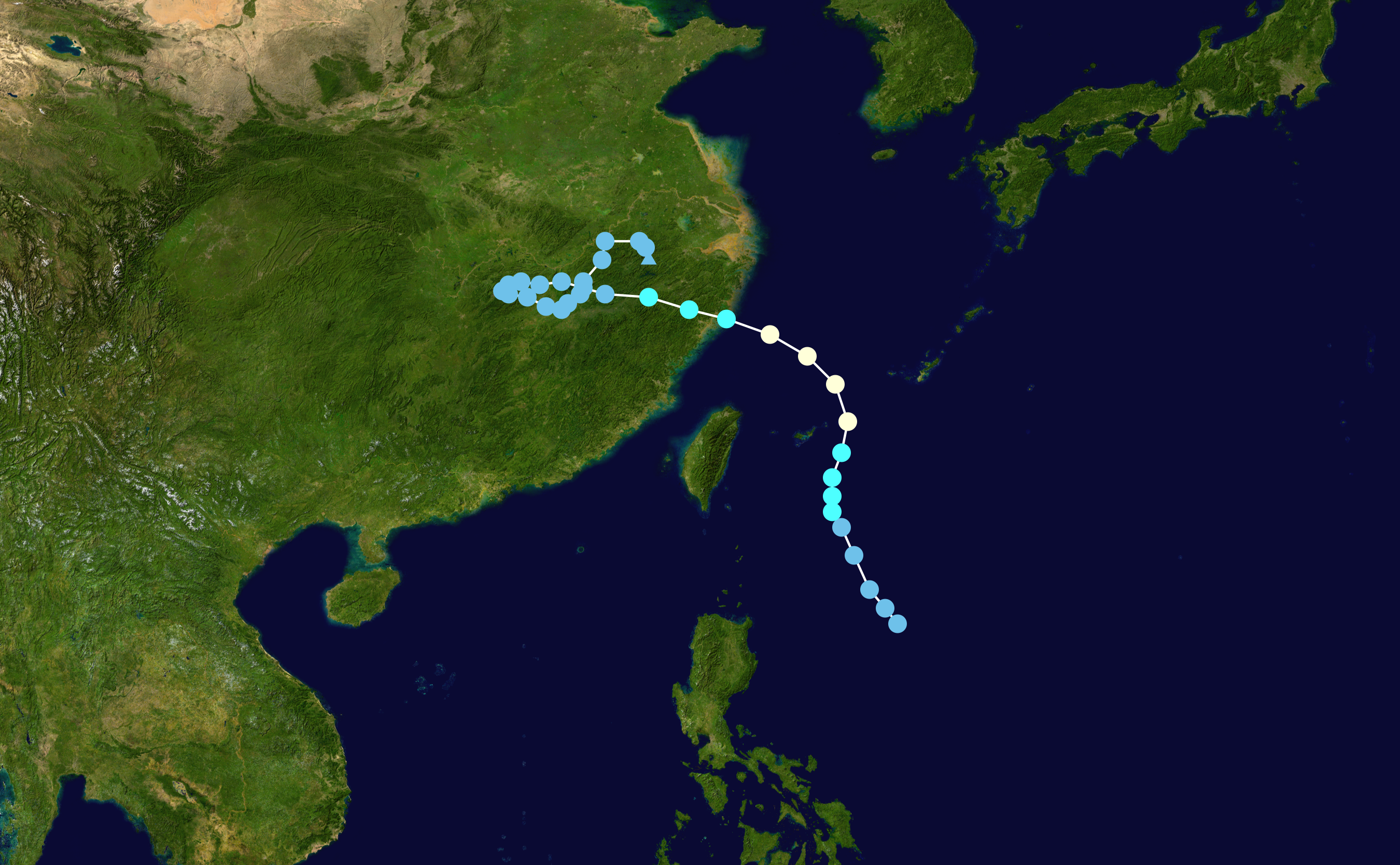
- Duration: August 9 – August 15
- Peak intensity: 120 km/h (75 mph) (1-min); 970 hPa (mbar)

Typhoon Ora first developed as an weak circulation on August 9. The influence of a nearby upper-level trough allowed it to intensify from a depression to a Category 1 typhoon in 30 hours. The typhoon passed Okinawa before making landfall in China near Wenzhou. It dissipated over land a few days later. Choppy seas caused by Ora sank a crowded motorboat near Leyte, killing 15 people.

=== Typhoon Rita ===
- Typhoon (JMA)
- Category 1 typhoon (SSHWS)
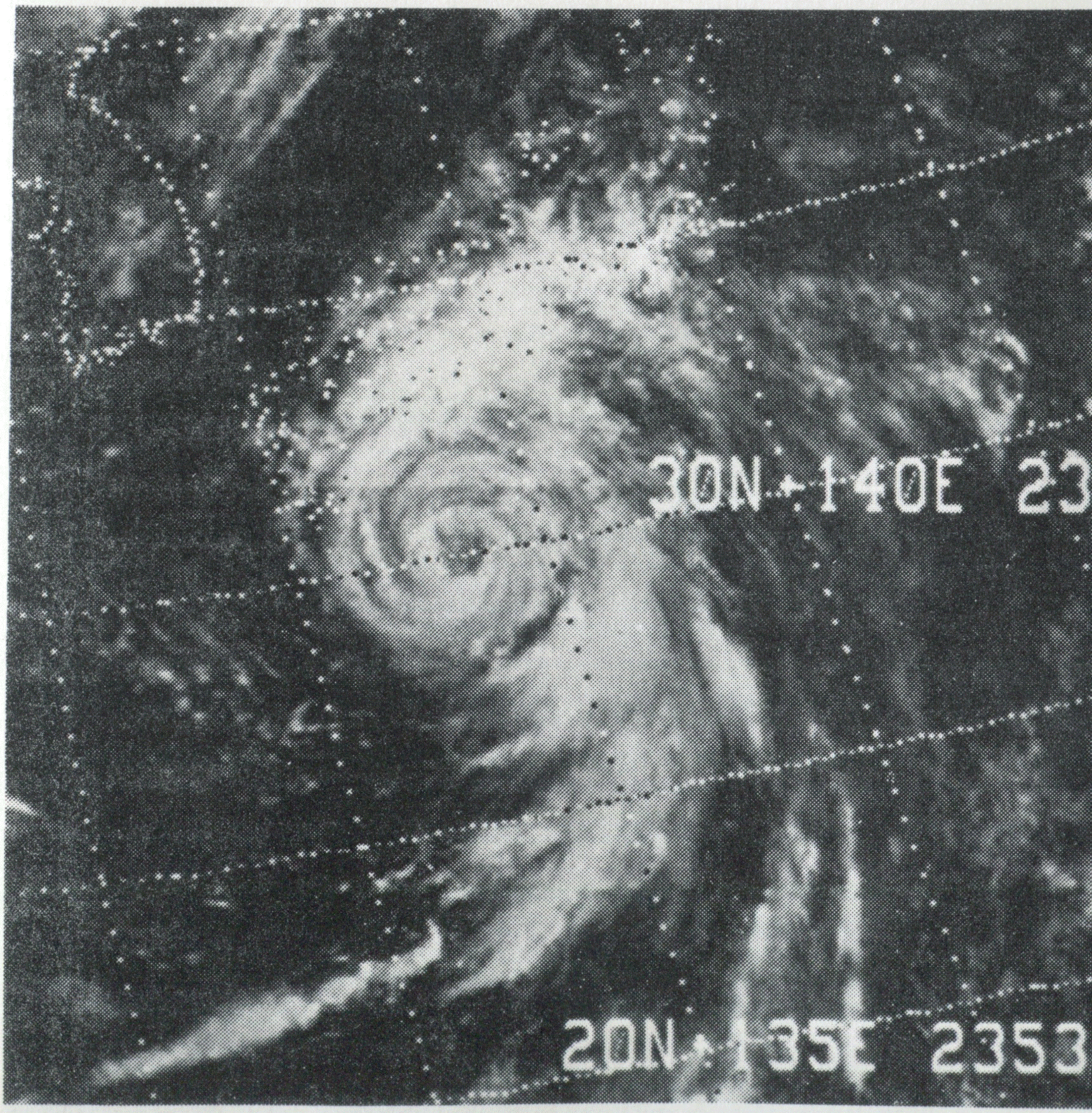
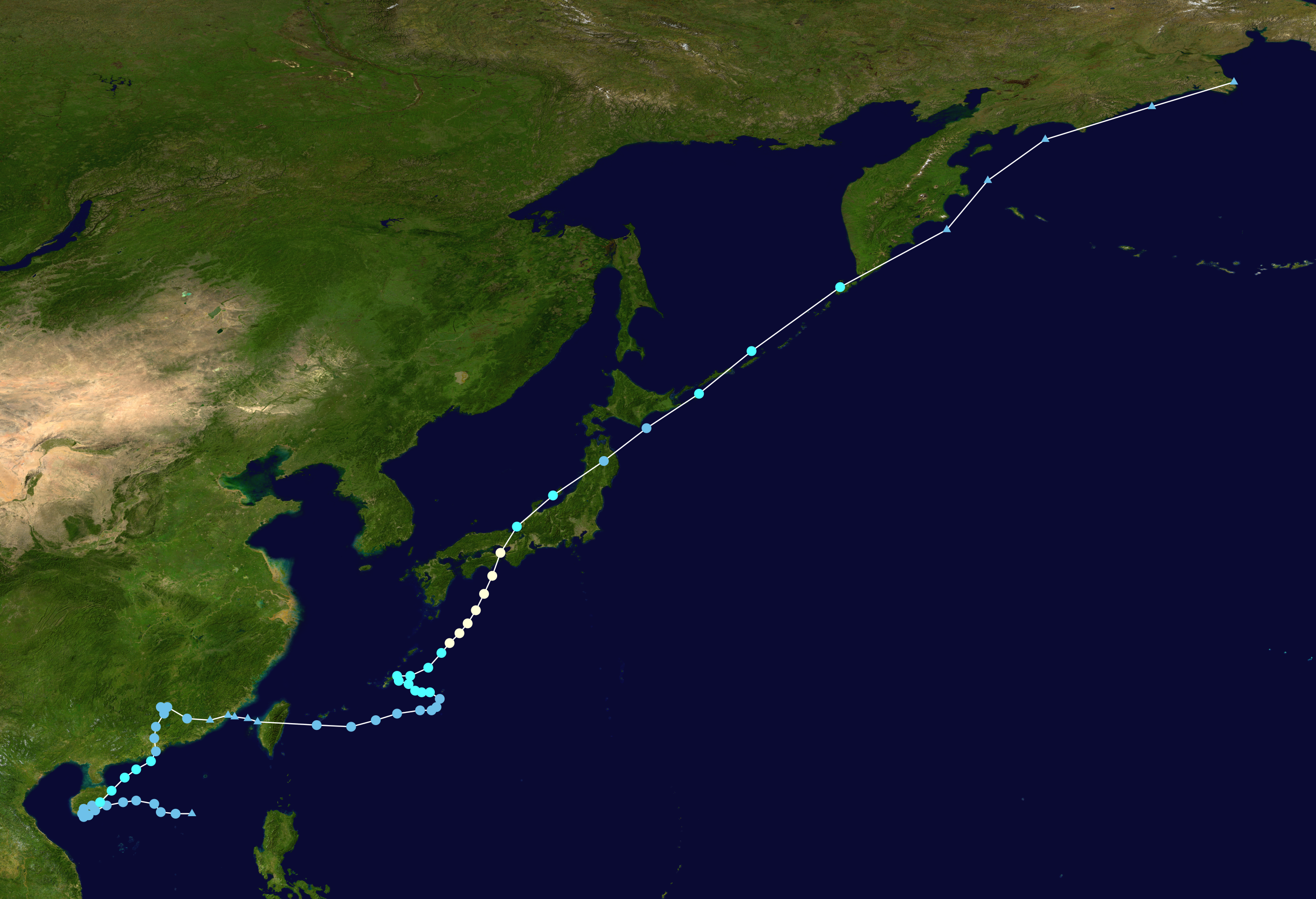
- Duration: August 9 – August 24
- Peak intensity: 150 km/h (90 mph) (1-min); 965 hPa (mbar)

Rita formed August 17 and erratically headed north and affected the Ryūkyū Islands. Rita then made landfall on Shikoku as a moderately strong Category 1 typhoon. It moved along the entire length of Japan, weakening to a depression. Rita strengthened back into a tropical storm over the Kuril Islands— an unusually northerly location— before dissipating on August 24. At least 26 deaths can be attributed to this typhoon from the heavy flooding— the worst in 10 years.

=== Typhoon Phyllis ===
- Typhoon (JMA)
- Category 4 typhoon (SSHWS)
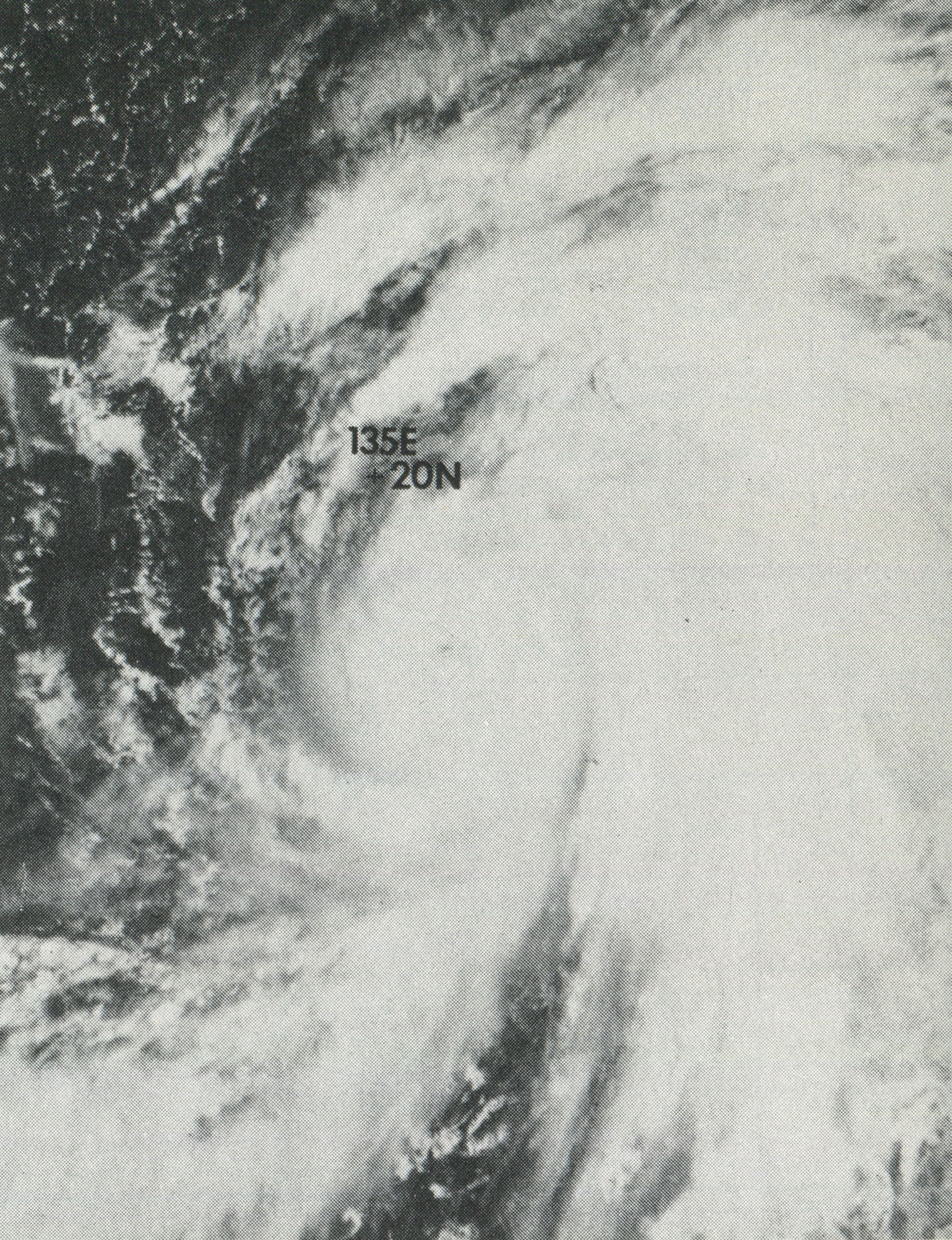
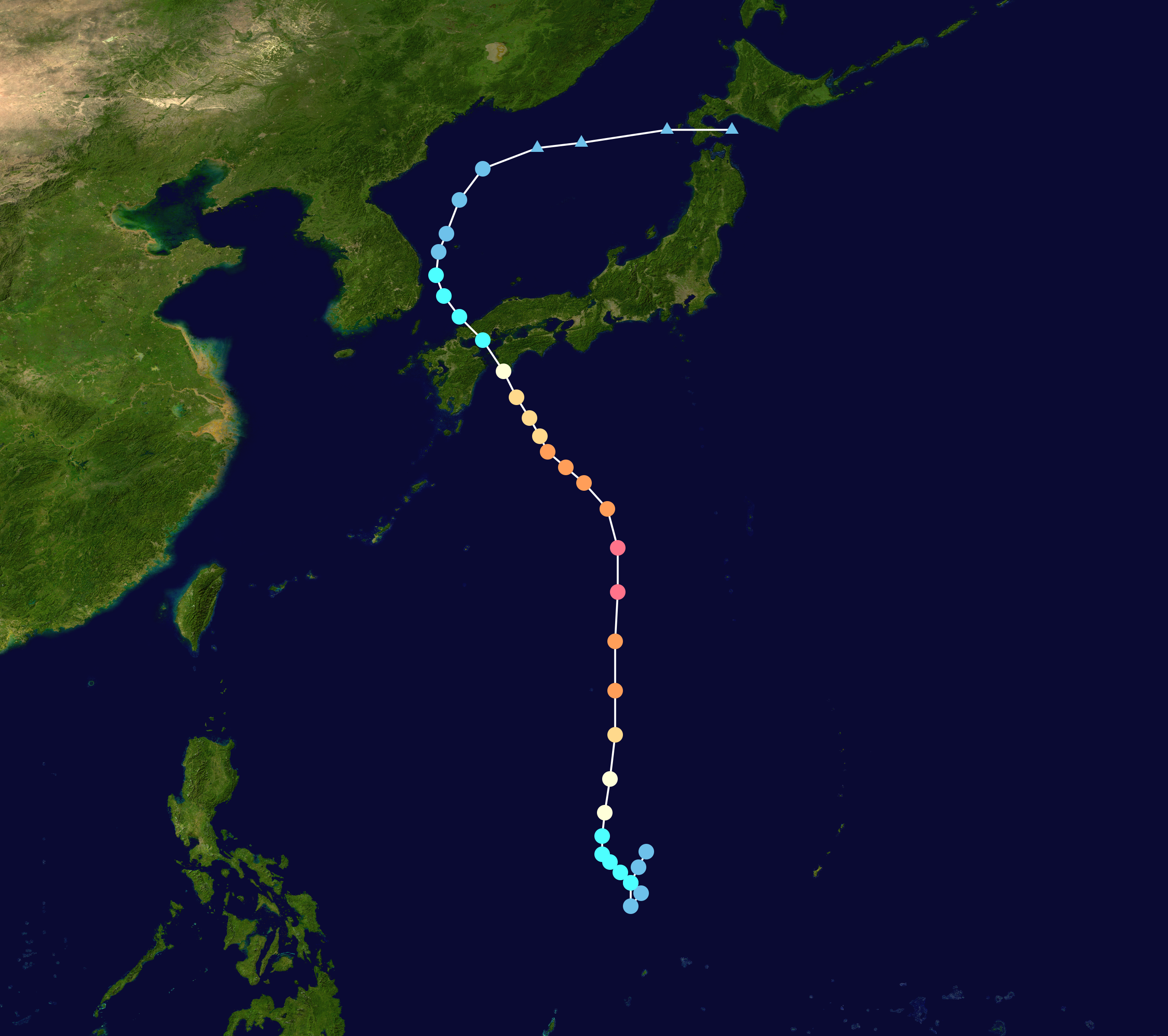
- Duration: August 12 – August 18
- Peak intensity: 220 km/h (140 mph) (1-min); 920 hPa (mbar)

Phyllis struck the southern part of Japan on August 17 as a minimal typhoon, having weakened from a peak of 140 mph winds. Phyllis caused over 60 casualties, with landslides and flooding causing moderate to heavy damage.

=== Tropical Depression Etang ===
- Tropical depression (PAGASA)
- Duration: August 12 – August 15
- Peak intensity: 55 km/h (35 mph) (10-min);

Formed on August 12th 1975. Had peak intensity of 55 km/h winds before dissipating on August 15th.

=== Tropical Storm Susan ===
- Severe tropical storm (JMA)
- Tropical storm (SSHWS)
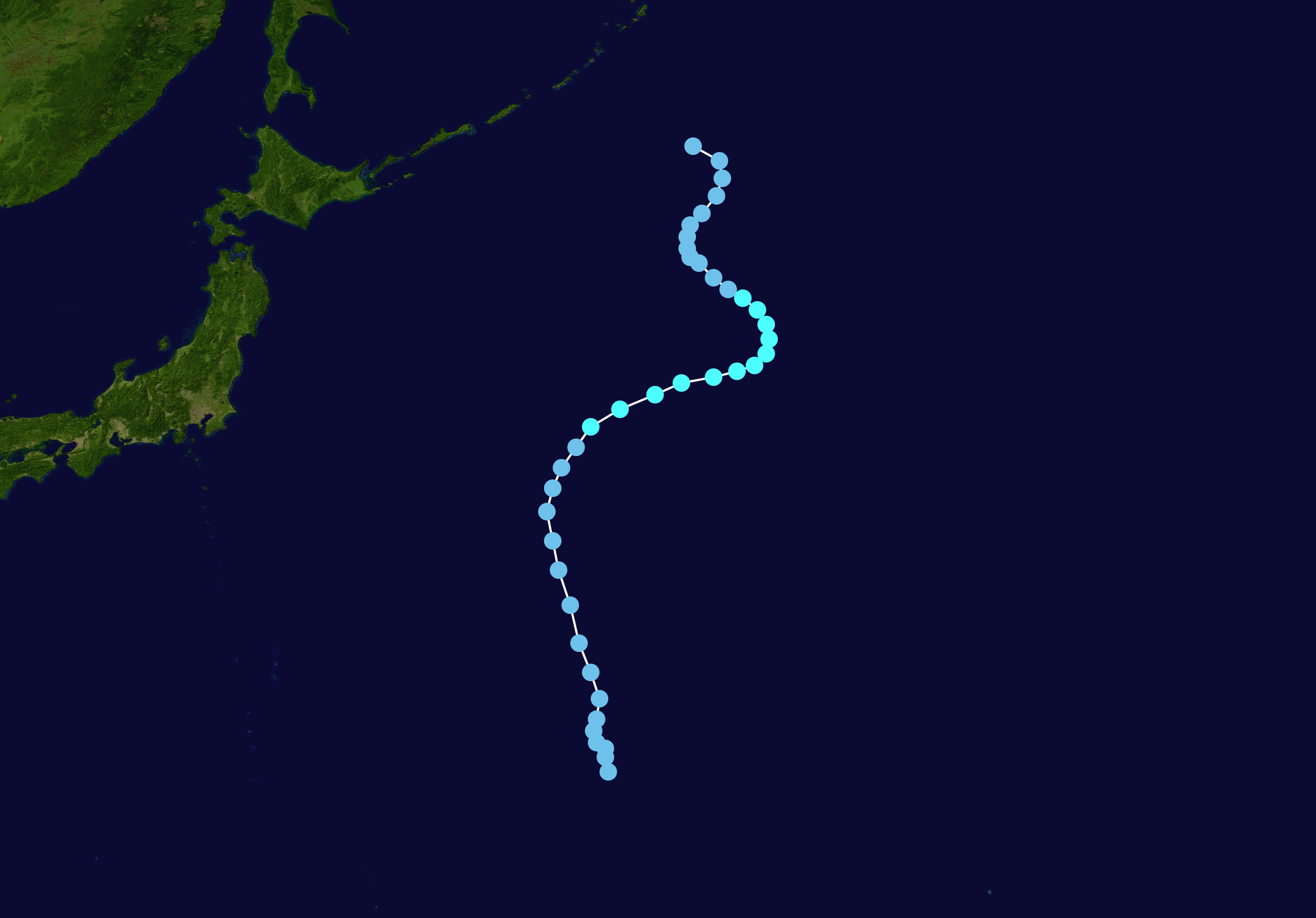
- Duration: August 25 – September 3
- Peak intensity: 95 km/h (60 mph) (1-min); 985 hPa (mbar)

Tropical Storm Susan formed far southwest of Tokyo, and slowly traveled northwards, reaching tropical storm intensity before weakening and finally dissipating on 3 September at sea west of Hokkaido.

=== Typhoon Tess ===
- Typhoon (JMA)
- Category 2 typhoon (SSHWS)
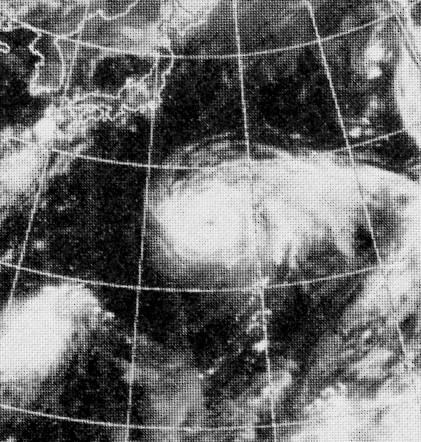
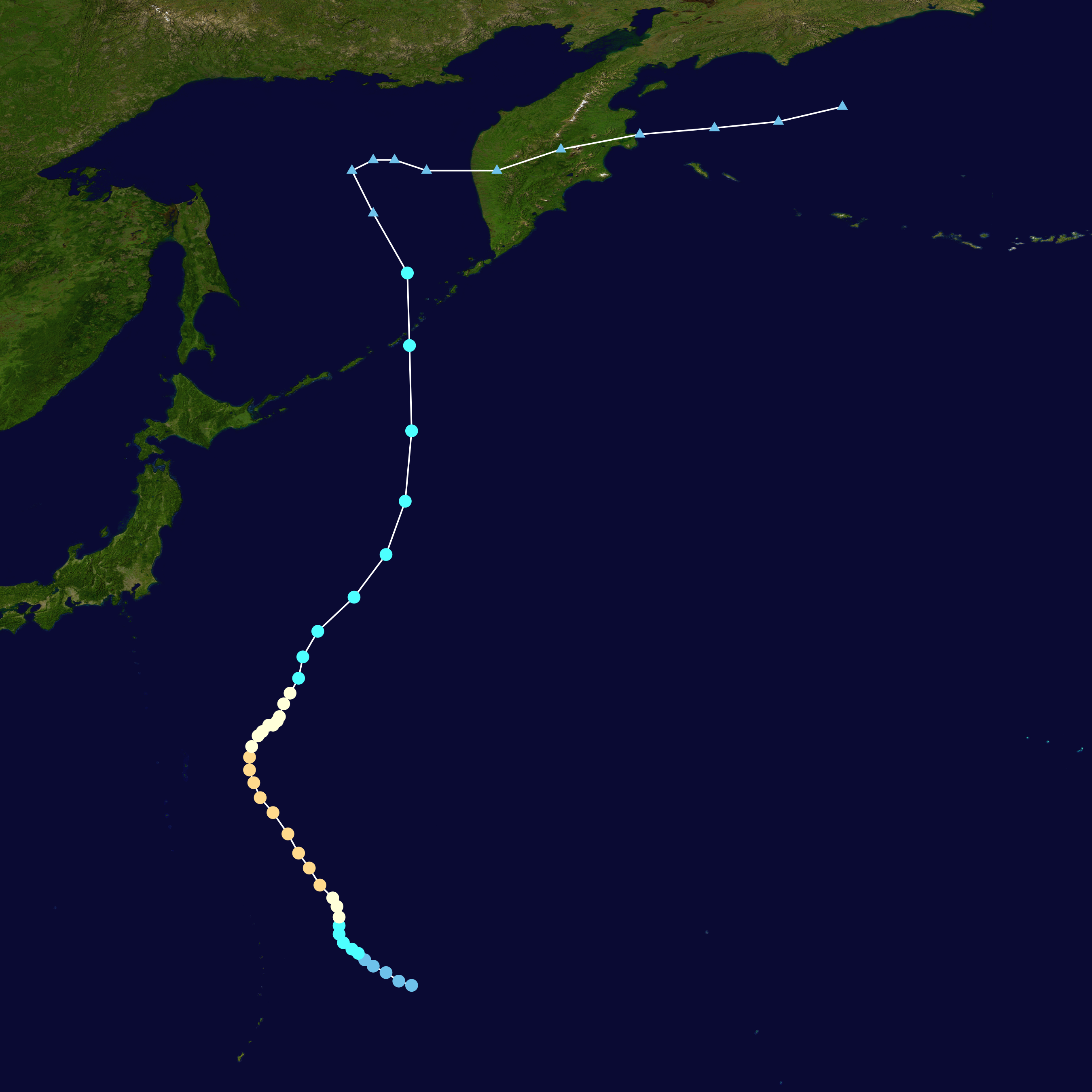
- Duration: September 1 – September 10
- Peak intensity: 175 km/h (110 mph) (1-min); 945 hPa (mbar)

Typhoon Tess was first noted as a closed circulation on 1 September 600 nautical miles east-northeast of Saipan. The storm intensified over the next few days, becoming a typhoon on the 3rd. The cyclone reached its peak intensity on the 4th. Tess then weakened, losing typhoon status on the 8th, and dissipating over the Sea of Irkutsk on the 10th, being absorbed into a frontal system.

=== Tropical Storm Viola (Gening) ===
- Tropical storm (JMA)
- Tropical storm (SSHWS)
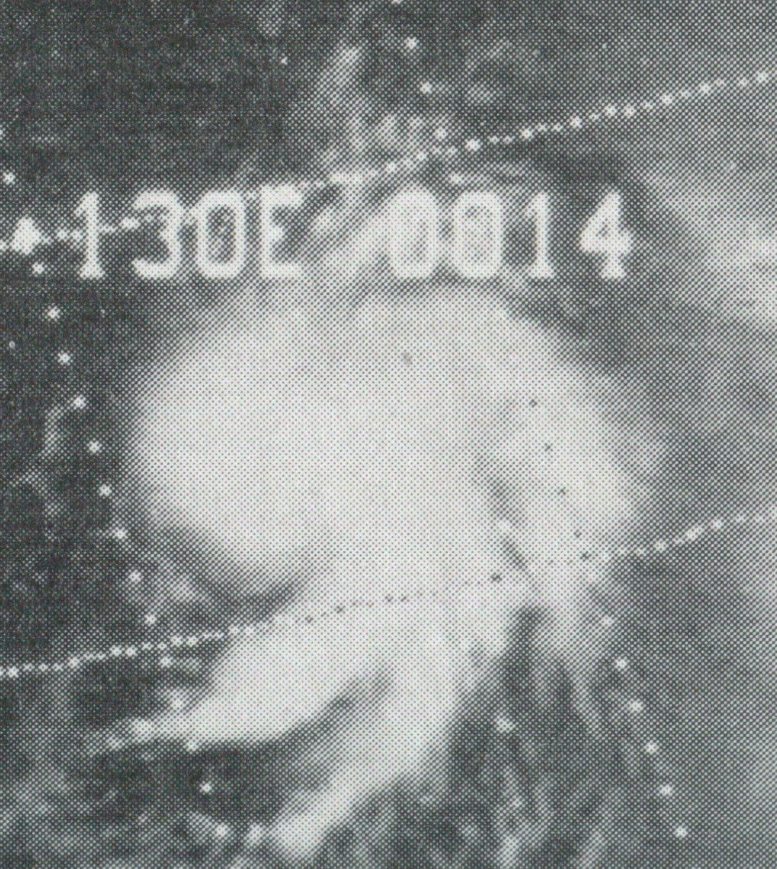
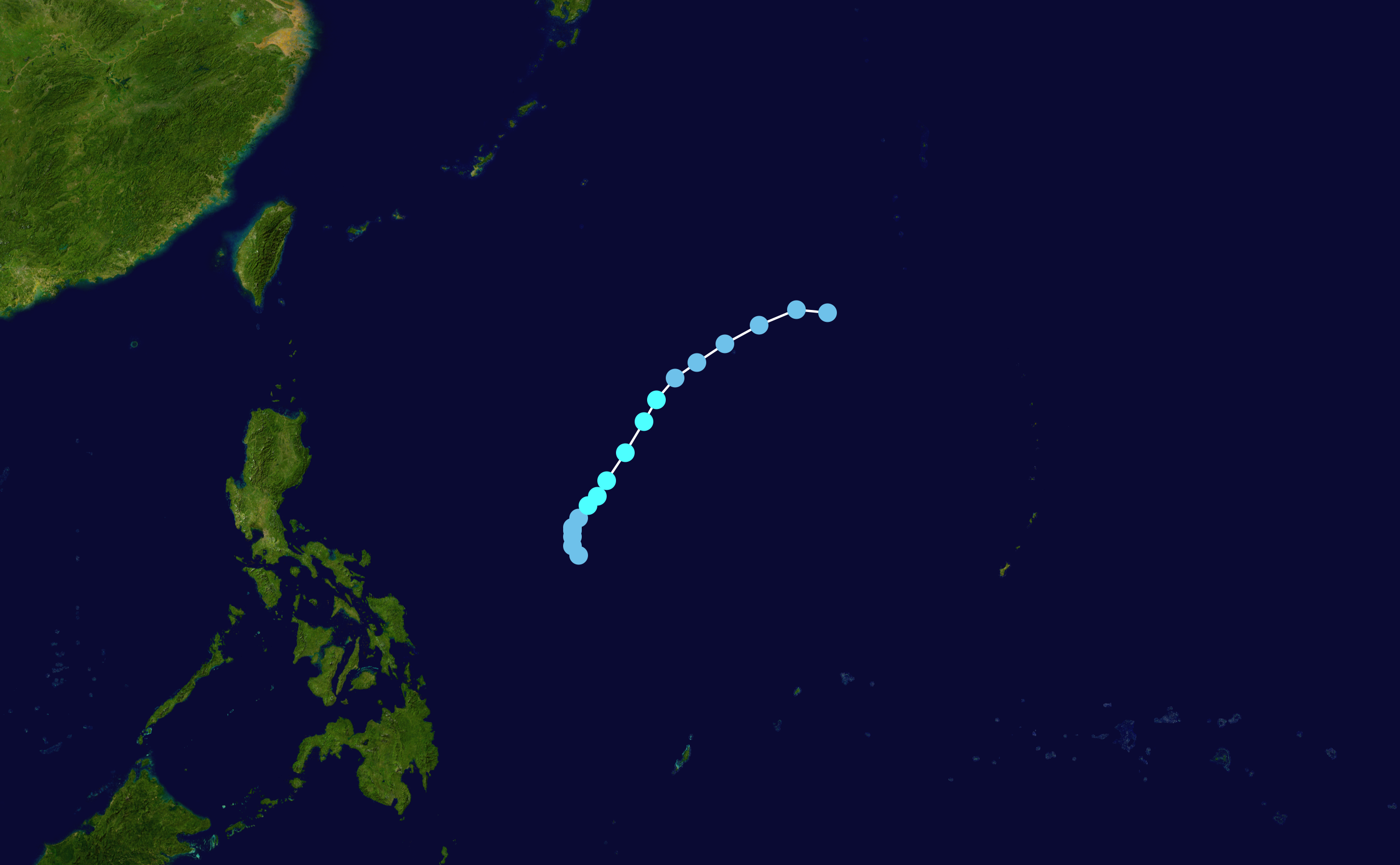
- Duration: September 4 – September 8
- Peak intensity: 85 km/h (50 mph) (1-min); 996 hPa (mbar)

Tropical Storm Viola formed at sea east of the Philippines and tracked northeast before dissipating four days later.

=== Typhoon Winnie ===
- Typhoon (JMA)
- Category 1 typhoon (SSHWS)
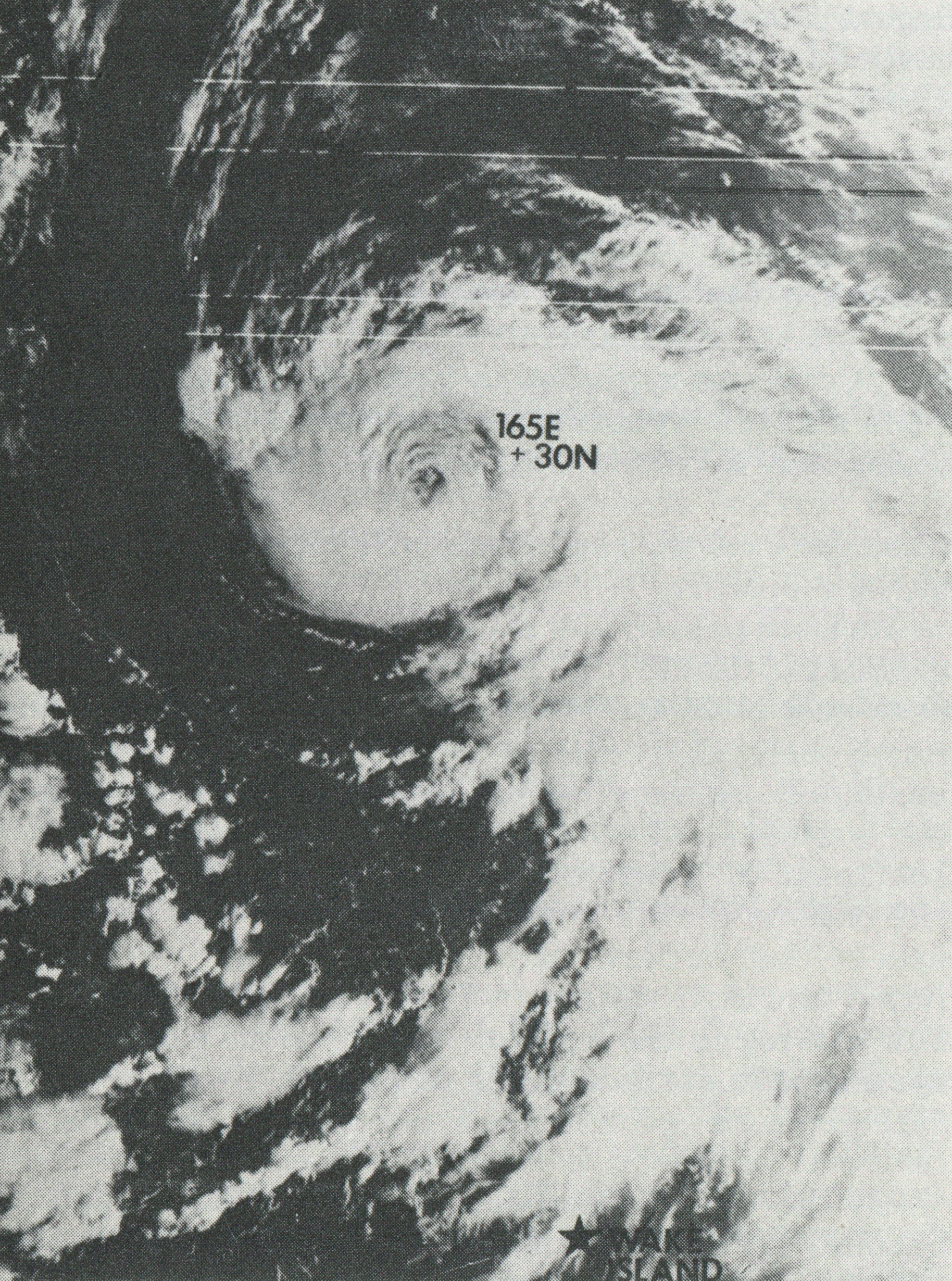
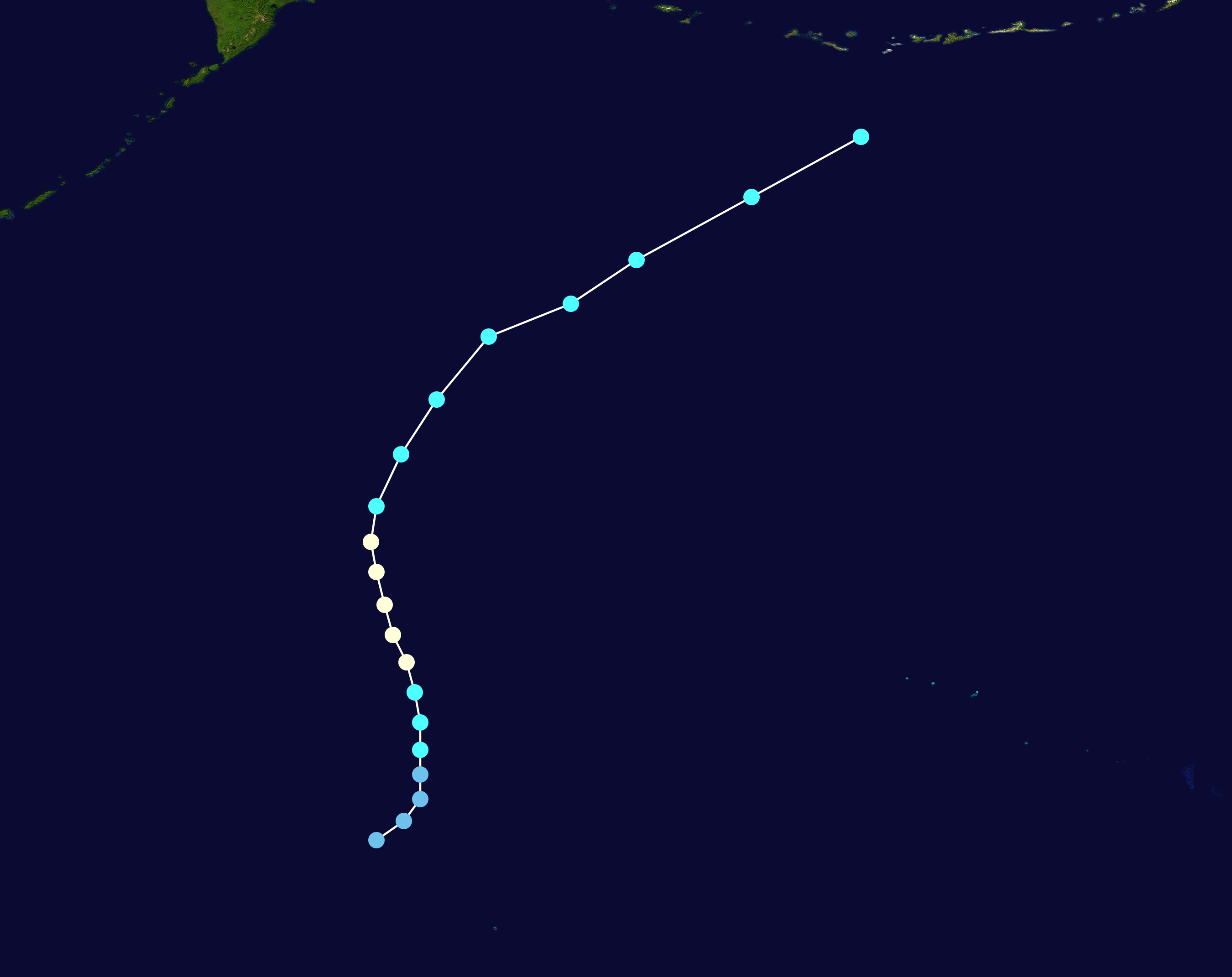
- Duration: September 8 – September 12
- Peak intensity: 120 km/h (75 mph) (1-min); 980 hPa (mbar)

Typhoon Winnie was first detected as a disturbance on 5 September, but it did not become a circulation until the 8th. Winnie tracked northwards, becoming a category 1 typhoon, but an unfavorable environment prevented it from intensifying further. It became extratropical on the 12th.

=== Typhoon Alice (Herming) ===
- Typhoon (JMA)
- Category 1 typhoon (SSHWS)
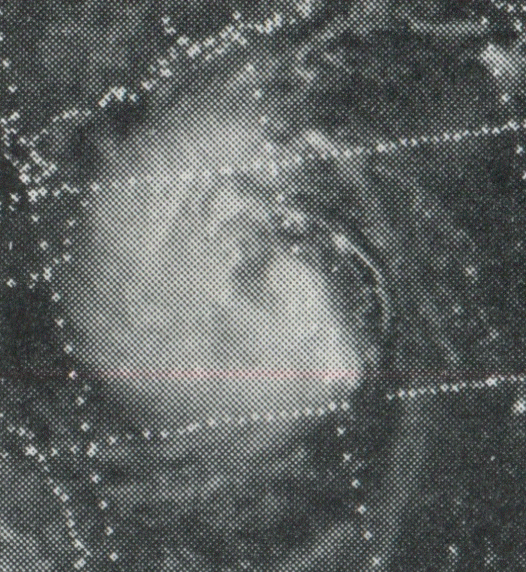
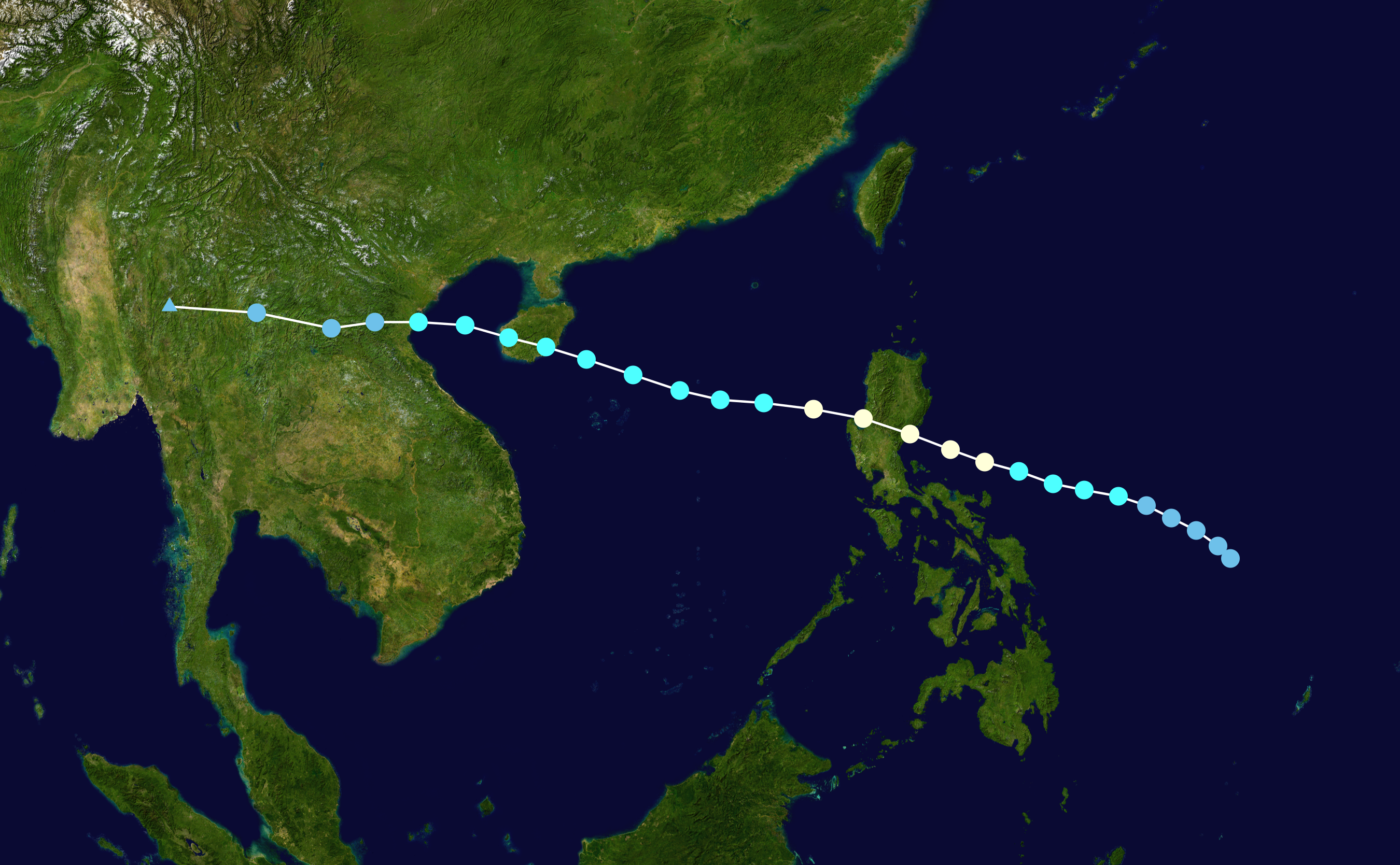
- Duration: September 15 – September 21
- Peak intensity: 140 km/h (85 mph) (1-min); 970 hPa (mbar)

Typhoon Alice (Not to be confused with Typhoon Alice from 1979; locally named Herming by PAGASA) hit the Philippine island of Luzon, It weakened over the South China Sea then struck China and Vietnam as a tropical storm, Then it finally dissipated over Thailand.

=== Typhoon Betty (Ising) ===
- Typhoon (JMA)
- Category 2 typhoon (SSHWS)
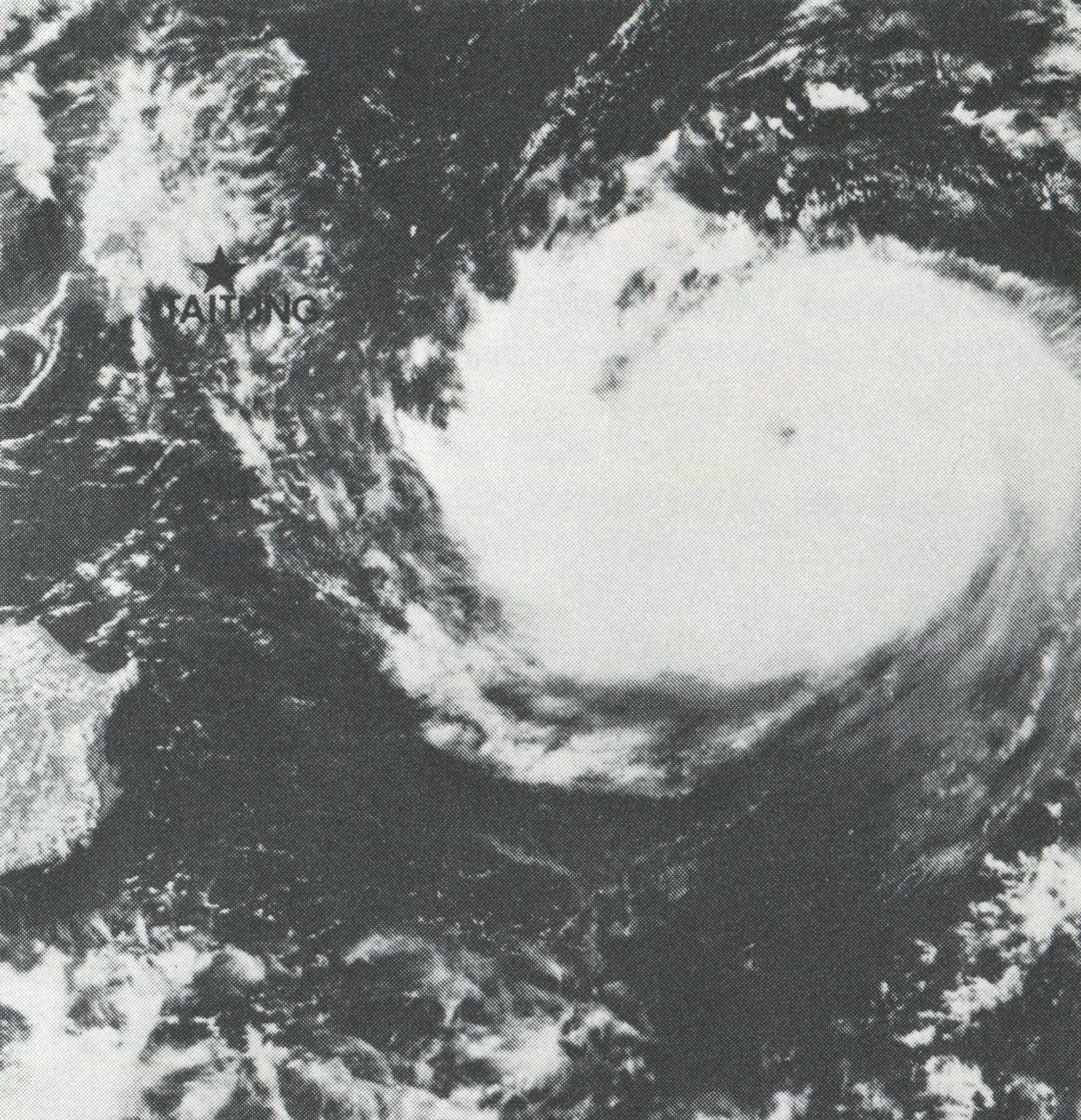
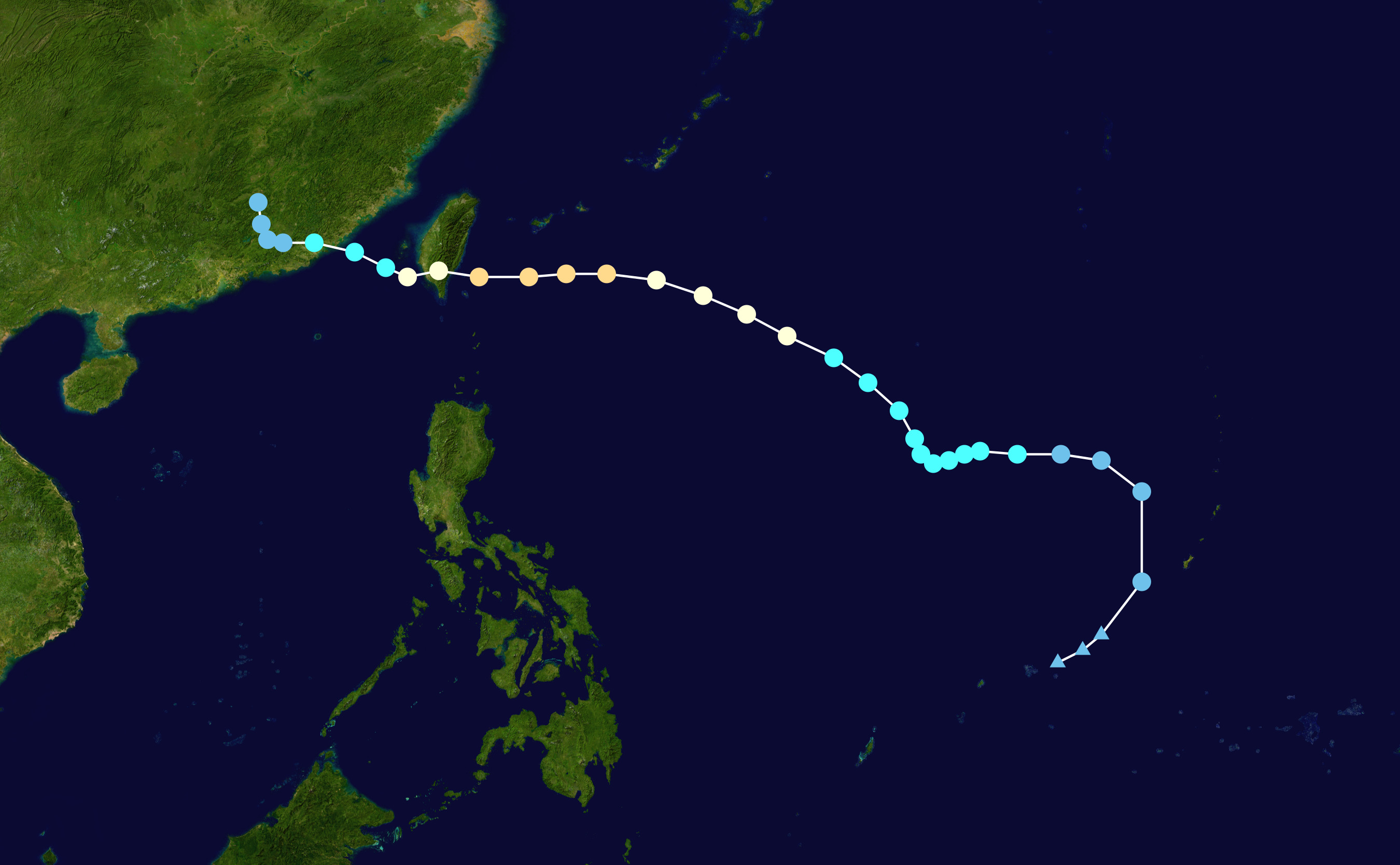
- Duration: September 17 – September 24
- Peak intensity: 175 km/h (110 mph) (1-min); 950 hPa (mbar)

Betty hit Taiwan and China.

=== Typhoon Cora (Luding) ===
- Typhoon (JMA)
- Category 3 typhoon (SSHWS)
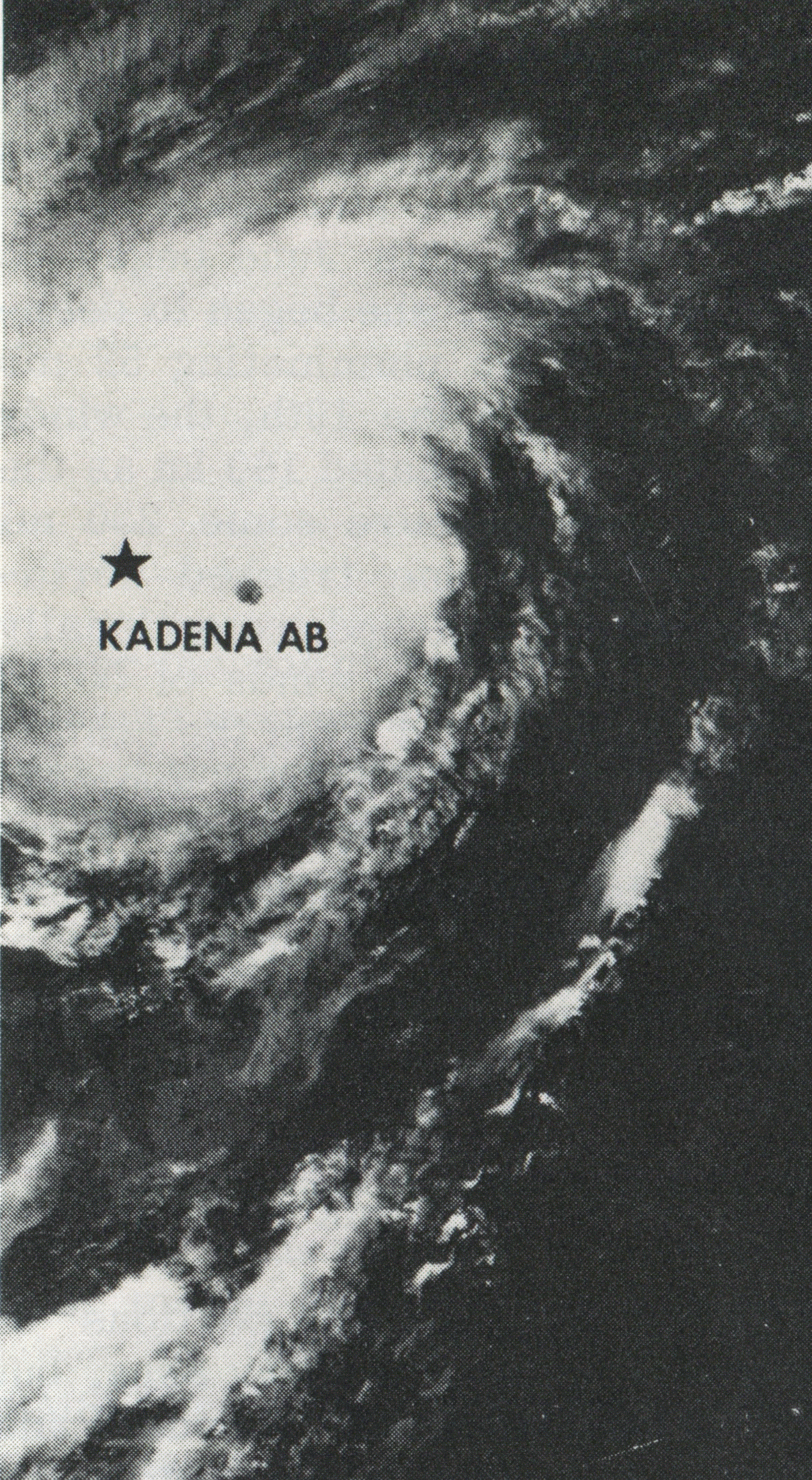
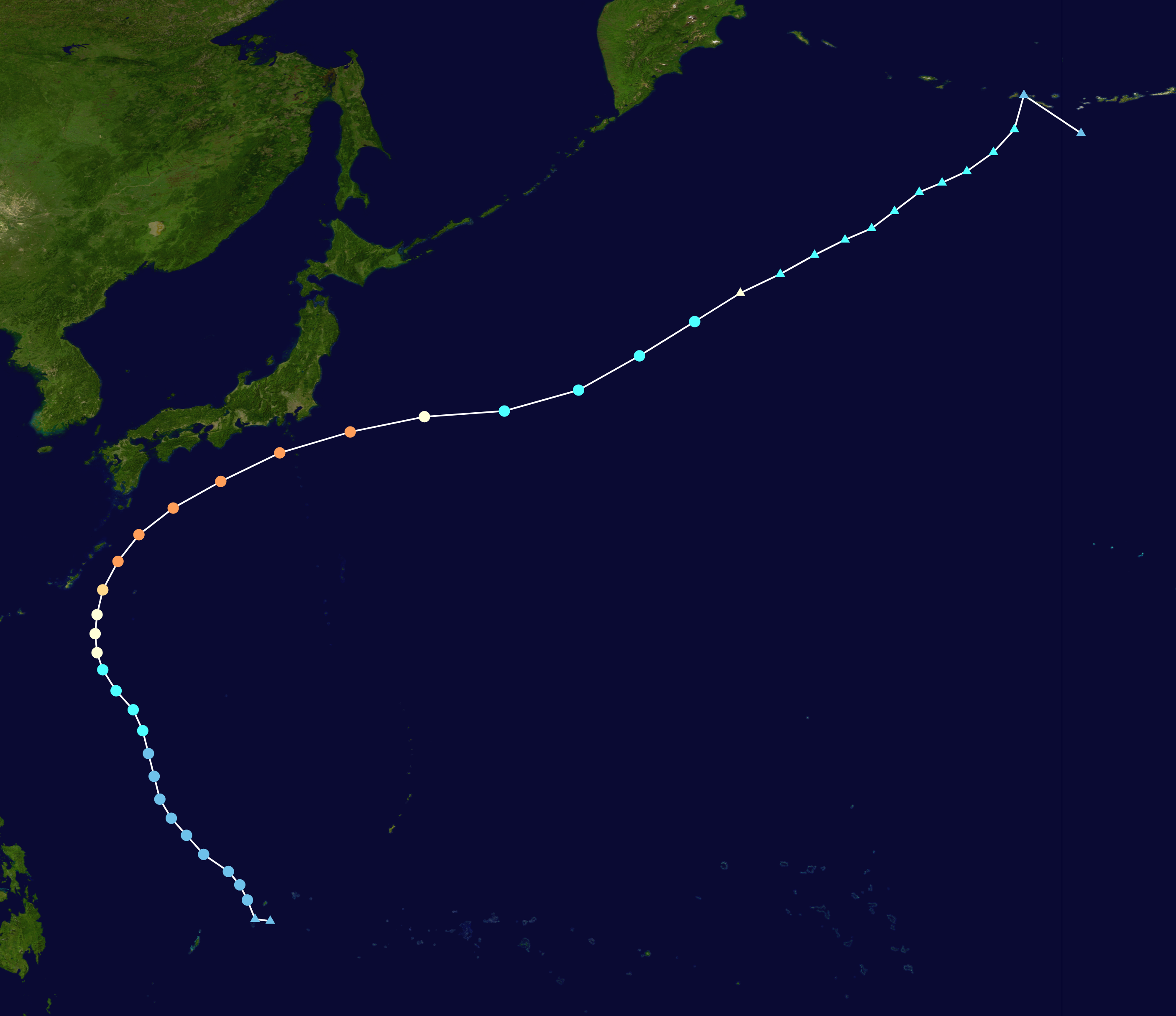
- Duration: September 29 – October 7
- Peak intensity: 195 km/h (120 mph) (1-min); 945 hPa (mbar)

Cora re-curved east of Japan.

=== Tropical Storm Doris ===
- Severe tropical storm (JMA)
- Tropical storm (SSHWS)
- Duration: October 2 – October 8
- Peak intensity: 100 km/h (65 mph) (1-min); 985 hPa (mbar)

Doris hit China as a high-end tropical storm.

=== Super Typhoon Elsie (Mameng) ===
- Typhoon (JMA)
- Category 4 super typhoon (SSHWS)
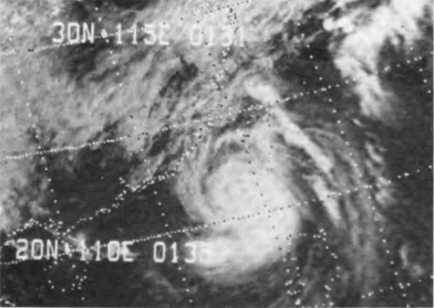
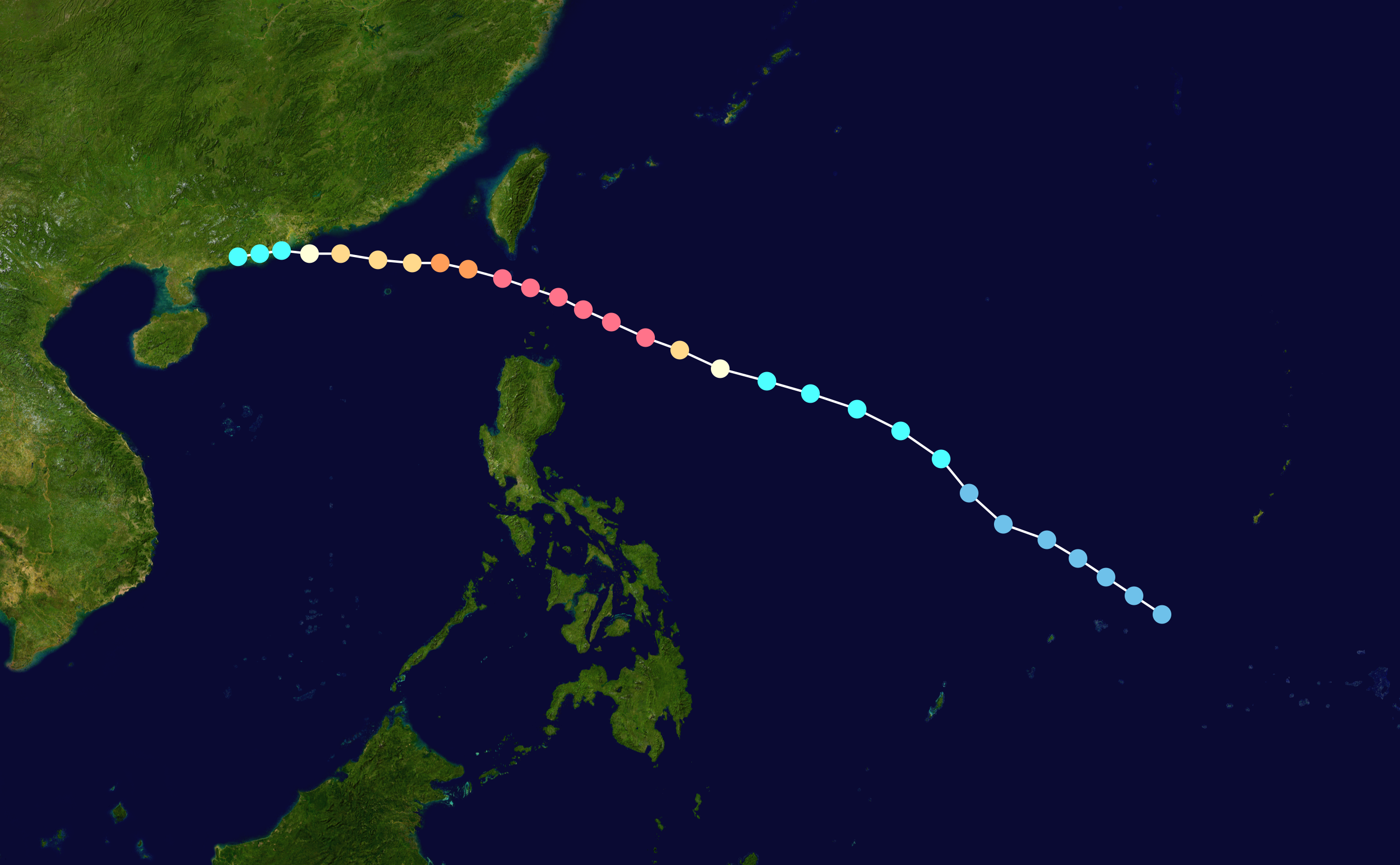
- Duration: October 8 – October 15
- Peak intensity: 250 km/h (155 mph) (1-min); 900 hPa (mbar)

Elsie hit Batanes as a Category 4 super typhoon, and also hit Hong Kong.

=== Typhoon Flossie (Neneng) ===
- Typhoon (JMA)
- Category 1 typhoon (SSHWS)
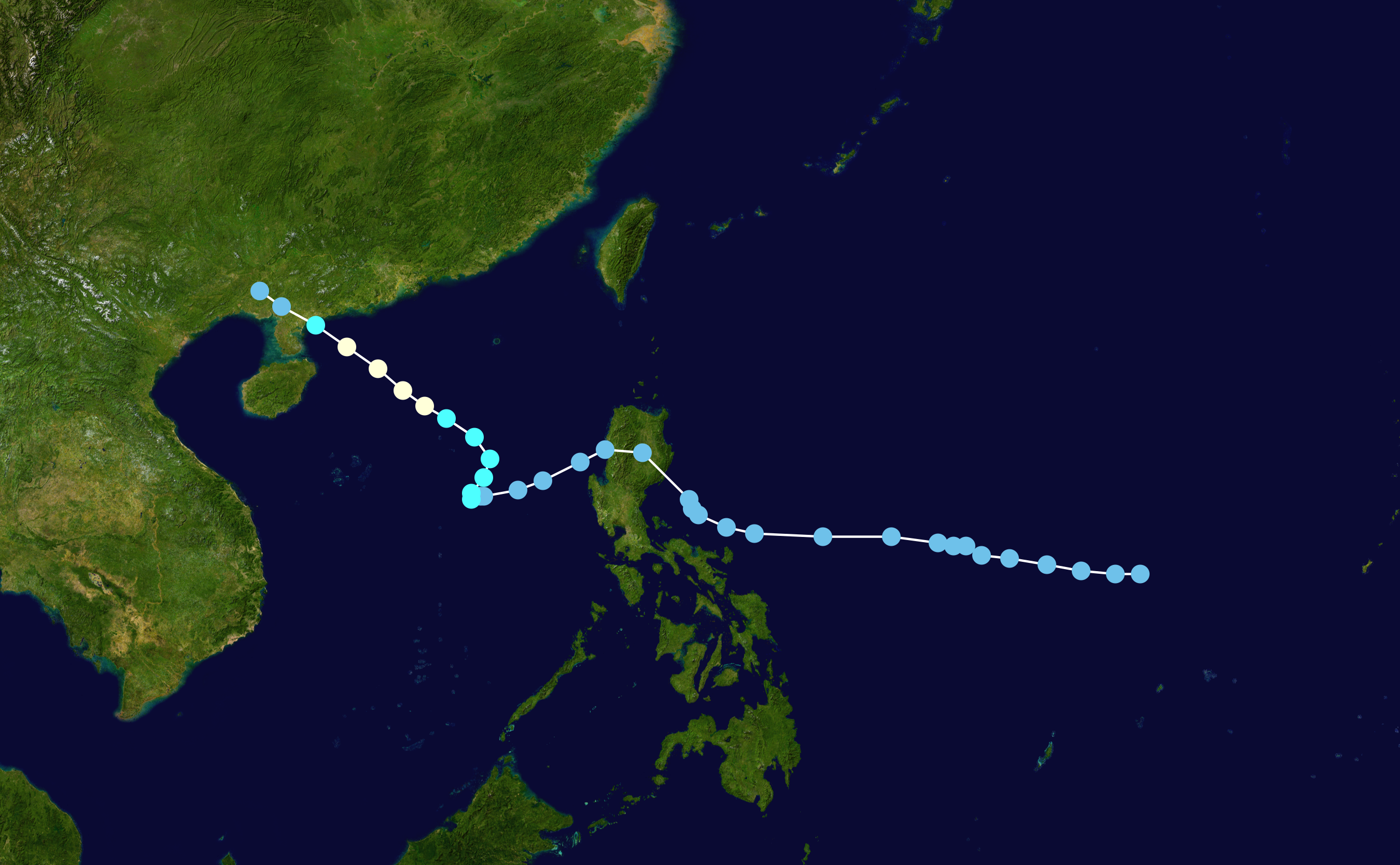
- Duration: October 15 – October 23
- Peak intensity: 130 km/h (80 mph) (1-min); 970 hPa (mbar)

Flossie struck the extreme southern part of China at Category 1 intensity. 44 people were lost from 2 freighters sinking.

=== Tropical Storm Grace (Oniang) ===
- Severe tropical storm (JMA)
- Tropical storm (SSHWS)
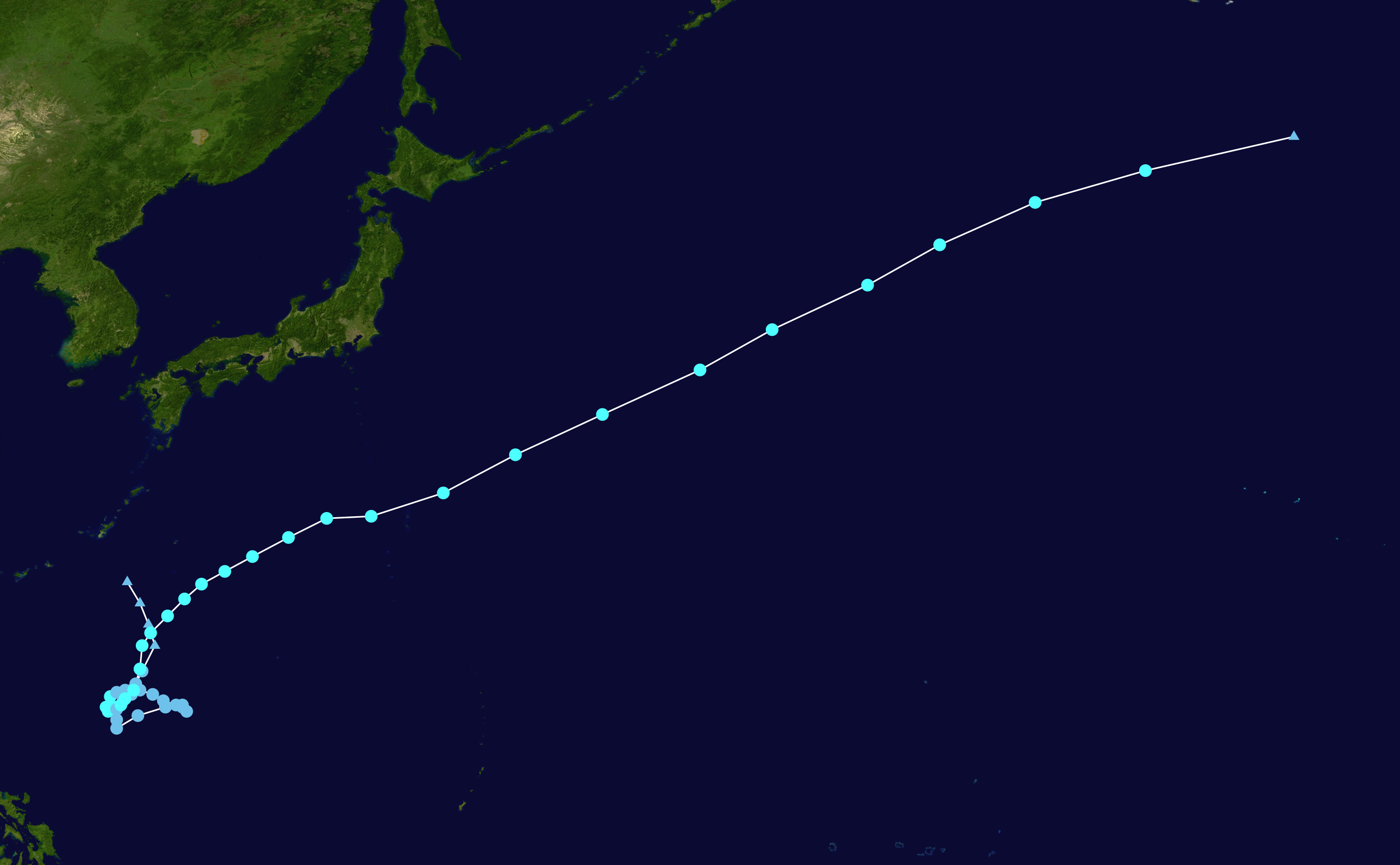
- Duration: October 23 – November 2
- Peak intensity: 110 km/h (70 mph) (1-min); 985 hPa (mbar)

Grace moved northwest away from the Philippines.

=== Tropical Storm Helen (Pepang) ===
- Tropical storm (JMA)
- Tropical storm (SSHWS)
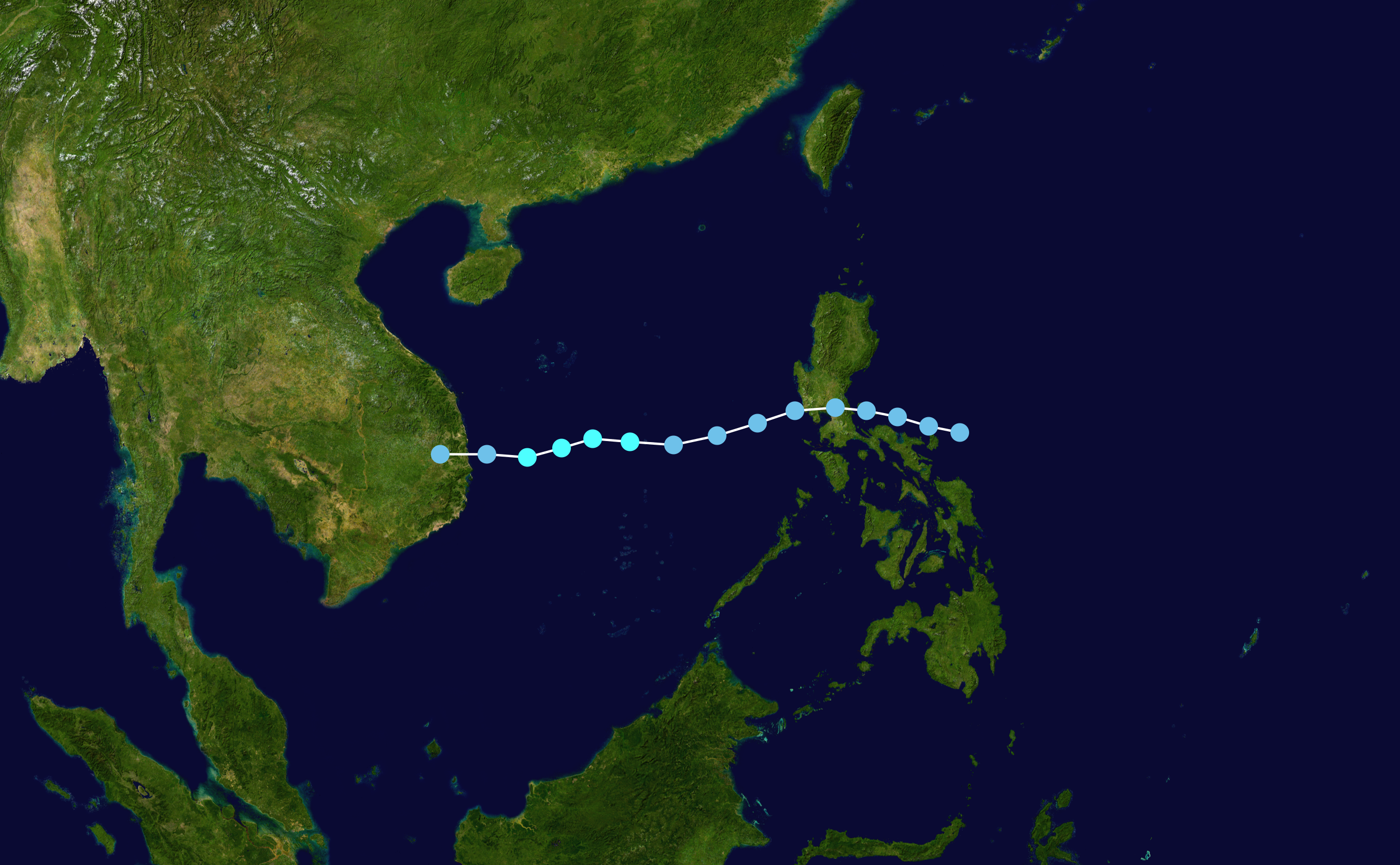
- Duration: November 1 – November 4
- Peak intensity: 85 km/h (50 mph) (1-min); 1000 hPa (mbar)

Helen hit Vietnam and the Philippines.

=== Typhoon Ida ===
- Typhoon (JMA)
- Category 2 typhoon (SSHWS)
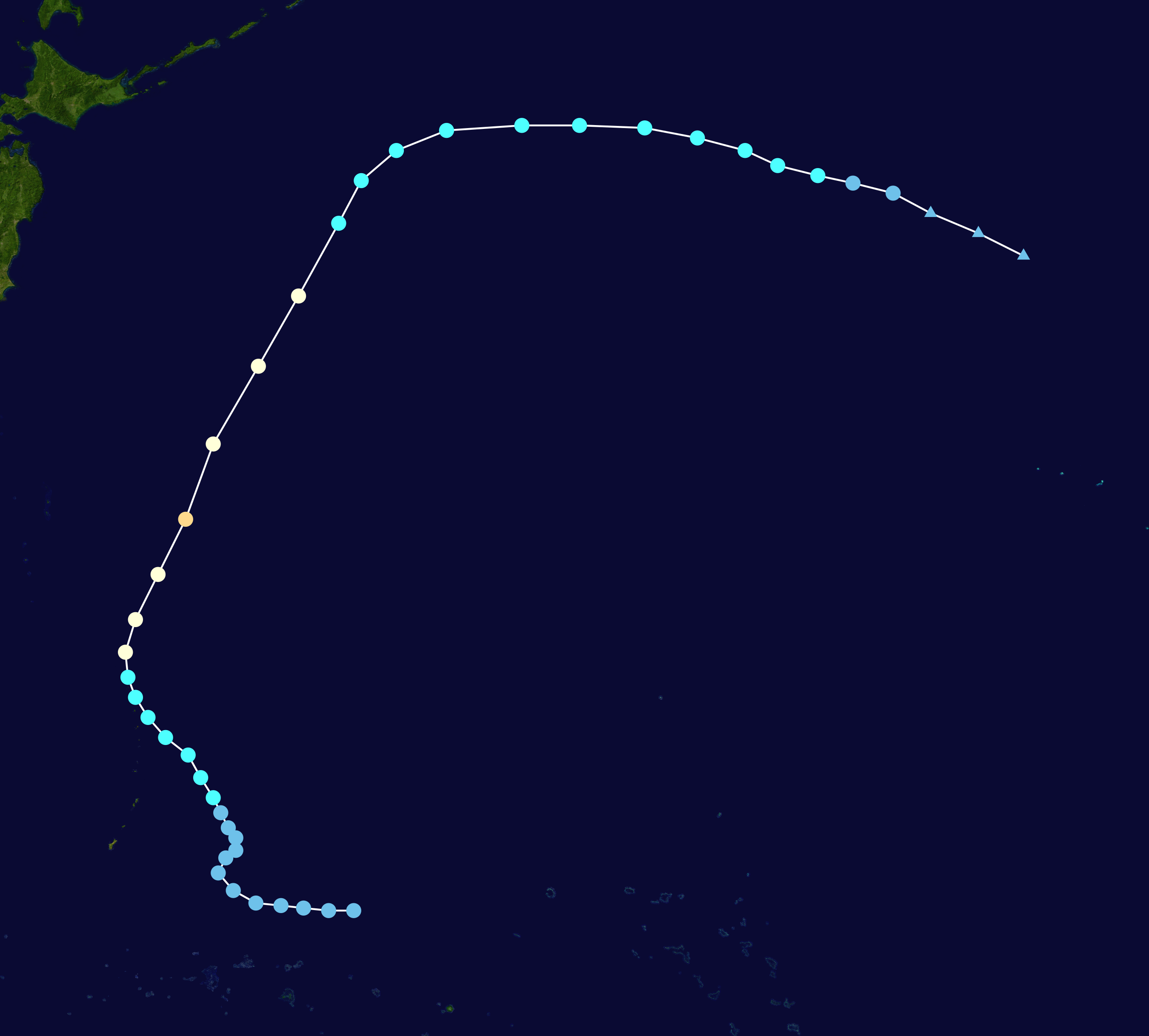
- Duration: November 5 – November 11
- Peak intensity: 155 km/h (100 mph) (1-min); 950 hPa (mbar)

Ida recurved out to sea and had no effect on land.

=== Super Typhoon June (Rosing) ===
- Typhoon (JMA)
- Category 5 super typhoon (SSHWS)
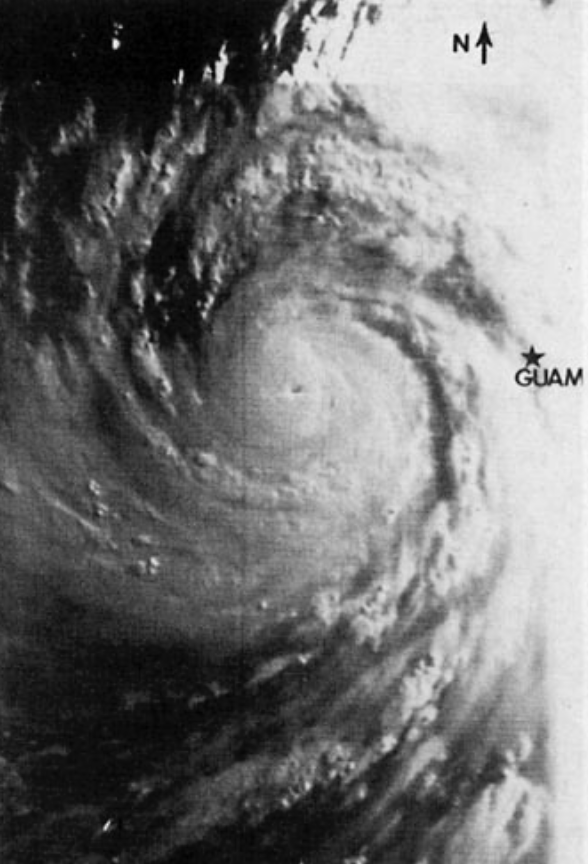
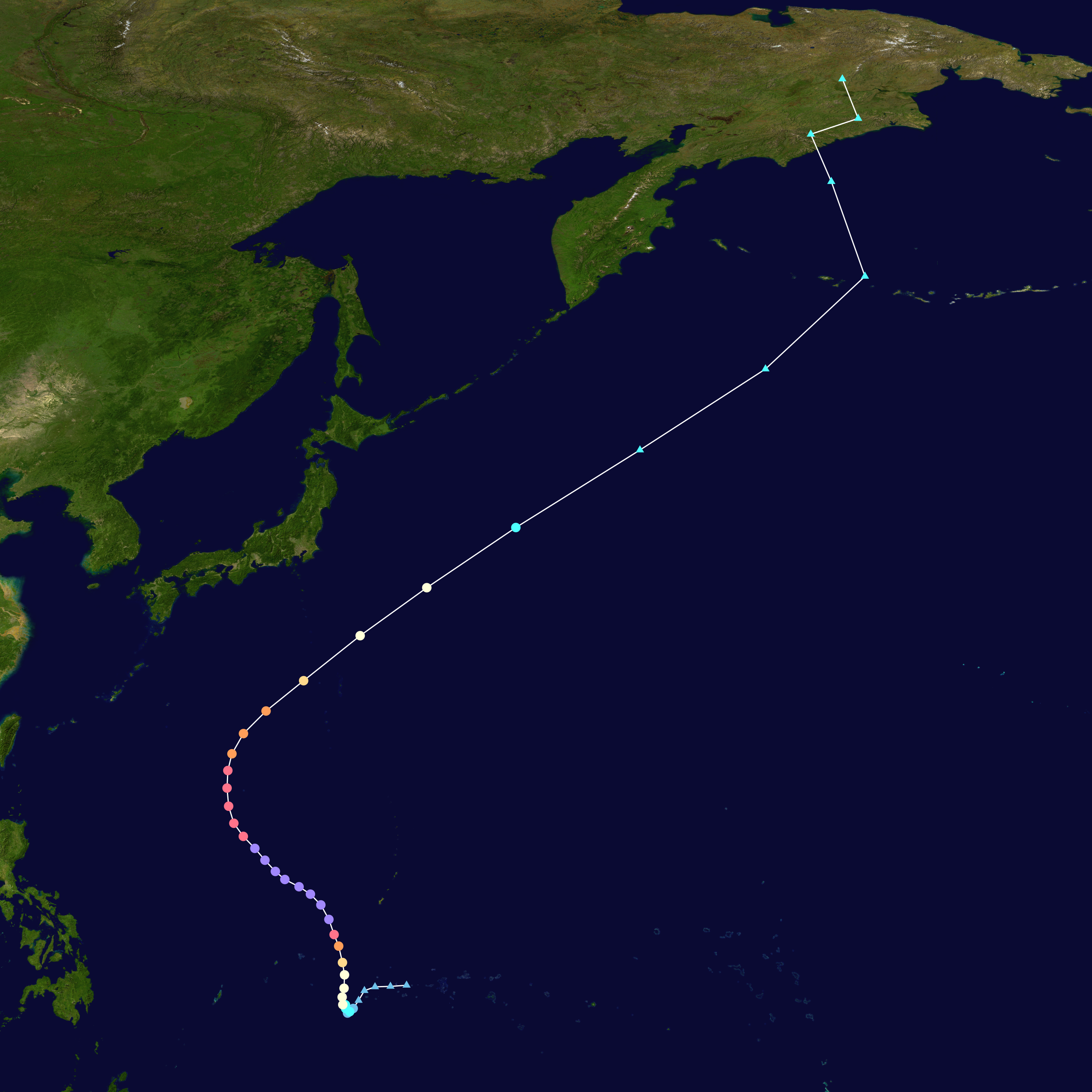
- Duration: November 15 – November 25
- Peak intensity: 295 km/h (185 mph) (1-min); 875 hPa (mbar)

On November 15, a disturbance was first detected in the monsoon trough well to the southeast of Guam, before finally developing into a tropical depression on November 16. Moving erratically, the depression was then later upgraded by the JTWC to a tropical storm. During November 17–18 June then began to explosively deepen as it moved to the north in response to a weakness in the ridge caused by a nearby trough, deepening as much as 52 mbars in under 12 hours, and 90 mbars in 24 hours. Early on November 19, a US Air Force reconnaissance aircraft measured a near record low pressure of 875mb just off the eyewall, indicating it could have been stronger. Shortly after the near-record peak, June then began a eyewall replacement cycle, becoming one of the first recorded cases of triple eyewalls. It then began to slowly weaken as it moved northwest, weakening below category 5 status early on November 21, before beginning to recurve to the northeast as it began extratropical transition, achieving a forward speed as high as 70mph. June finally became extratropical late on November 23. The remnants then became a powerful extratropical storm, with a pressure of 960mb before it was last noted over far northeastern Siberia. Typhoon June never made landfall, but passed 230 miles west of Guam, causing severe flooding. There were no casualties, but several buildings were destroyed by the strong winds by June, and storm surge and crop damage was estimated at $300,000 (1975 USD).

=== Tropical Depression 25W ===
- Tropical storm (JMA)
- Tropical depression (SSHWS)
- Duration: December 25 – December 30
- Peak intensity: 65 km/h (40 mph) (1-min); 996 hPa (mbar)

25W formed in the South China Sea.

=== Tropical Depression 24W (Sisang) ===
- Tropical depression (JMA)
- Tropical depression (SSHWS)
- Duration: December 26 – December 30
- Peak intensity: 55 km/h (35 mph) (1-min); 1002 hPa (mbar)

A late season tropical depression affected the Philippines before turning back toward the ocean and dissipated out at sea.

== Storm names ==
=== International ===
Western North Pacific tropical cyclones were named by the Joint Typhoon Warning Center. The first storm of 1975 was named Lola and the final one was named June.

- Agnes
- Bonnie
- Carmen
- Della
- Elaine
- Faye
- Gloria
- Hester
- Irma
- Judy
- Kit
- Lola 1W
- Mamie 3W
- Nina 4W
- Ora 6W
- Phyllis 7W
- Rita 8W
- Susan 9W
- Tess 10W
- Viola 11W
- Winnie 12W
- Alice 13W
- Betty 14W
- Cora 15W
- Doris 16W
- Elsie 17W
- Flossie 19W
- Grace 20W
- Helen 21W
- Ida 22W
- June 23W
- Kathy
- Lorna
- Marie
- Nancy
- Olga
- Pamela
- Ruby
- Sally
- Therese
- Violet
- Wilda
- Anita
- Billie
- Clara
- Dot
- Ellen
- Fran
- Georgia
- Hope
- Iris
- Joan
- Kate
- Louise
- Marge
- Nora
- Opal
- Patsy
- Ruth
- Sarah
- Thelma
- Vera
- Wanda
- Amy
- Babe
- Carla
- Dinah
- Emma
- Freda
- Gilda
- Harriet
- Ivy
- Jean
- Kim
- Lucy
- Mary
- Nadine
- Olive
- Polly
- Rose
- Shirley
- Trix
- Virginia
- Wendy

=== Philippines ===
Auring	Bebeng	Karing	Diding	Etang
Gening	Herming	Ising	Luding	Mameng
Neneng	Oniang	Pepang	Rosing	Sisang
Trining (unused)	Uring (unused)	Warling (unused)	Yayang (unused)	
Auxiliary list
				Ading (unused)
Barang (unused)	Krising (unused)	Dadang (unused)	Erling (unused)	Goying (unused)

The Philippine Atmospheric, Geophysical and Astronomical Services Administration uses its own naming scheme for tropical cyclones in their area of responsibility. PAGASA assigns names to tropical depressions that form within their area of responsibility and any tropical cyclone that might move into their area of responsibility. Should the list of names for a given year prove to be insufficient, names are taken from an auxiliary list, the first 6 of which are published each year before the season starts. Names not retired from this list will be used again in the 1979 season. This is the same list used for the 1971 season. PAGASA uses its own naming scheme that starts in the Filipino alphabet, with names of Filipino female names ending with "ng" (A, B, K, D, etc.). Names that were not assigned/going to use are marked in gray.

== Season effects ==
This table will list all the storms that developed in the northwestern Pacific Ocean west of the International Date Line and north of the equator during 1975. It will include their intensity, duration, name, areas affected, deaths, and damage totals. Classification and intensity values will be based on estimations conducted by the JMA, the JTWC, and/or PAGASA. Peak wind speeds are in one-minute sustained standards unless otherwise noted. All damage figures will be in 1975 USD. Damages and deaths from a storm will include when the storm was a precursor wave or an extratropical low.

Name	Dates	Peak intensity			Areas affected	Damage (USD)	Deaths	Ref(s).
Name	Dates	Category	Wind speed	Pressure	Areas affected	Damage (USD)	Deaths	Ref(s).
Lola (Auring)	January 20 – 28	Typhoon	130 km/h (80 mph)	975 hPa (28.79 inHg)	Philippines	Unknown	30	
02W	April 22 – 28	Tropical depression	55 km/h (35 mph)	1004 hPa (29.65 inHg)	Philippines	None	None	
TD	April 28 – 30	Tropical depression	Not specified	1008 hPa (29.77 inHg)	Philippines	None	None	
TD	June 16 – 19	Tropical depression	Not specified	998 hPa (29.47 inHg)	South China, Vietnam	None	None	
TD	July 4 – 6	Tropical depression	Not specified	1004 hPa (29.65 inHg)	None	None	None	
TD	July 4 – 5	Tropical depression	Not specified	1008 hPa (29.77 inHg)	Mariana Islands	None	None	
TD	July 23 – 26	Tropical depression	Not specified	1012 hPa (29.89 inHg)	None	None	None	
Mamie	July 24 – 30	Tropical storm	75 km/h (45 mph)	992 hPa (29.29 inHg)	Japan	None	None	
Nina (Bebeng)	July 30 – August 5	Typhoon	250 km/h (155 mph)	900 hPa (26.58 inHg)	Taiwan, Ryukyu Islands, East China	$1.2 billion	229,000	
05W (Karing)	August 4 – 7	Tropical depression	55 km/h (35 mph)	998 hPa (29.47 inHg)	Taiwan	None	None	
Ora (Diding)	August 9 – 15	Typhoon	250 km/h (155 mph)	900 hPa (28.79 inHg)	Taiwan, Ryukyu Islands, East China	None	None	
TD	August 9	Tropical depression	Not specified	1000 hPa (29.53 inHg)	Philippines	None	None	
Rita	August 9 – 24	Typhoon	150 km/h (90 mph)	965 hPa (28.50 inHg)	China, Ryukyu Islands, Taiwan, Japan	$114 million	33	
Phyllis	August 12 – 18	Typhoon	220 km/h (140 mph)	920 hPa (27.17 inHg)	Japan	$37 million	88	
TD	August 14 – 17	Tropical depression	Not specified	996 hPa (29.41 inHg)	Ryukyu Islands	None	None	
TD	August 23 – 26	Tropical depression	Not specified	1000 hPa (29.53 inHg)	South China, Vietnam	None	None	
Susan	August 25 – September 3	Severe tropical storm	95 km/h (60 mph)	985 hPa (29.09 inHg)	Japan	None	None	
TD	August 27	Tropical depression	Not specified	1004 hPa (29.65 inHg)	None	None	None	
TD	August 28 – 31	Tropical depression	Not specified	1000 hPa (29.53 inHg)	South China, Vietnam	None	None	
Tess	September 1 – 10	Typhoon	175 km/h (110 mph)	945 hPa (27.91 inHg)	None	None	None	
Viola (Gening)	September 4 – 8	Tropical storm	85 km/h (50 mph)	996 hPa (29.41 inHg)	None	None	None	
TD	September 6 – 9	Tropical depression	Not specified	1000 hPa (29.53 inHg)	Vietnam, Laos	None	None	
Winnie	September 8 – 12	Typhoon	120 km/h (75 mph)	980 hPa (28.94 inHg)	None	None	None	
TD	September 12 – 14	Tropical depression	Not specified	1012 hPa (29.89 inHg)	None	None	None	
Alice (Herming)	September 15 – 21	Typhoon	140 km/h (85 mph)	970 hPa (28.64 inHg)	Philippines, South China, Vietnam, Laos	Unknown	Unknown	
Betty (Ising)	September 17 – 24	Typhoon	175 km/h (110 mph)	950 hPa (28.05 inHg)	Taiwan, East China	Unknown	Unknown	
TD	September 23 – 24	Tropical depression	Not specified	1004 hPa (29.65 inHg)	None	None	None	
Cora (Luding)	September 29 – October 7	Typhoon	195 km/h (120 mph)	945 hPa (27.91 inHg)	Ryukyu Islands, Japan	None	None	
Doris	October 2 – 8	Severe tropical storm	100 km/h (65 mph)	985 hPa (29.09 inHg)	China	Unknown	Unknown	
Elsie (Mameng)	October 8 – 15	Typhoon	250 km/h (155 mph)	900 hPa (26.58 inHg)	Philippines, Taiwan, South China	Unknown	Unknown	
18W	October 15 – 16	Tropical depression	45 km/h (30 mph)	1002 hPa (29.59 inHg)	Taiwan	None	None	
Flossie (Neneng)	October 17 – 23	Typhoon	130 km/h (80 mph)	970 hPa (28.64 inHg)	Philippines, South China	Unknown	44	
Grace (Oyang)	October 23 – November 2	Severe tropical storm	110 km/h (70 mph)	985 hPa (29.09 inHg)	None	None	None	
TD	October 25 – 27	Tropical depression	Not specified	1006 hPa (29.71 inHg)	Mariana Islands	None	None	
Helen (Pepang)	November 1 – 4	Tropical storm	85 km/h (50 mph)	1000 hPa (29.53 inHg)	Philippines, Vietnam, Cambodia	None	None	
Ida	November 5 – 11	Typhoon	155 km/h (100 mph)	950 hPa (28.05 inHg)	Caroline Islands, Mariana Islands	None	None	
June (Rosing)	November 16 – 24	Typhoon	295 km/h (185 mph)	875 hPa (25.84 inHg)	Caroline Islands, Mariana Islands	$1.3 million	None	
25W	December 25 – 30	Tropical storm	55 km/h (35 mph)	996 hPa (29.41 inHg)	Philippines	None	None	
24W (Sisang)	December 26 – 30	Tropical depression	55 km/h (35 mph)	1002 hPa (29.59 inHg)	Philippines	None	None	
Season aggregates
39 systems	January 20 – December 30, 1975		295 km/h (185 mph)	875 hPa (25.84 inHg)		>$1.35 billion	>229,135	

== See also ==
- 1975 Pacific hurricane season
- 1975 Atlantic hurricane season
- 1975 North Indian Ocean cyclone season
- Australian cyclone seasons: 1974–75, 1975–76
- South Pacific cyclone seasons: 1974–75, 1975–76
- South-West Indian Ocean cyclone seasons: 1974–75, 1975–76
