= Kiantalaotsy =

Austronesian language of Mayotte

- Native to: Madagascar
- Ethnicity: Antalaotra
- Language family: Austronesian: Malayo-Polynesian; Western Indonesian; Barito; East Barito; Northern malagasic; Bushi; Kiantalaotsy
- Writing system: Latin script (Malagasy alphabet)

Language codes
- ISO 639-3: buc
- Glottolog: kian1236
- Linguasphere: 31-LDA-gb

A native speaker of Kibushi Kimaore or Kibushi Sakalava, a dialect with few distinctions from Kiantalaotsy.

Kiantalaotsy is a northern dialect of Malagasy in Mayotte. It is a dialect of Bushi.

== Classification ==
Kiantalaotsy belongs to the Austronesian language family. It is part of Northern Malagasic subgroup along with Tsimihety, Northern Sakalava, Northern Betsimisaraka and Antakarana.

== Geographic distribution ==
Kiantalaotsy is spoken mostly in Poroani and Ouangani.

== Vocabulary ==
=== Etymological comparison with Standard Malagasy ===
English	Malagasy standard	Kiantalaotsy
Little	Kely	Kely
Good	Tsara	Meva
Teeth	Nify	Nify
Man	Lehilahy	Lalahy

=== Etymological difference with Kibushi Kimaore ===
The differences between those to dialects of Bushi are small.

English	Kibushi Kimaore	Kiantalaotsy
And	Ndraiky	Ndreky
Good	Tsara	Meva
Hot	Mafana / Mey / May	Mahamay
Man	Lalahy	Lalahy
Teeth	Hify	Nify

== See also ==
- Shimaore
- Northern Sakalava
