= Marofotsy dialect =

Dialect of Malagasy

Marofotsy
- Native to: Madagascar
- Ethnicity: Marofotsy
- Language family: Austronesian: Malayo-Polynesian; Western Indonesian; Barito; East Barito; Central-Eastern Malagasic; Plateau Malagasy; Marofotsy
- Writing system: Latin script (Malagasy alphabet)

Language codes
- ISO 639-1: mg
- ISO 639-3: plt
- Marofotsy dialect – Tsaratanana Two residents of Tsaratanana recounting an incident involving a bandit attack in their village.

Marofotsy dialect is a Malagasy dialect spoken mainly by malagasy tribe of the same name.

== Location ==
Marofotsy is spoken in the district of Tsaratanana in the region of Betsiboka.

== Classification ==
The Marofotsy dialect belongs to the Plateaux Malagasy group, together with Sihanaka, Merina, Antaifasy, and Antambahoaka.

== Characteristics ==
Marofotsy is a transitional dialect between the Northern Sakalava dialect (more precisely the Boina variety) and the Merina dialect. It retains several Merina features such as the suffixes -ka, -tra, and -na, while also showing influence from Northern Sakalava. For example, fitaovanandreo (“their tools”) corresponds to fitaovan’ireo in Merina.

Although the vocabulary is largely similar to that of Merina, Marofotsy differs in its sentence structure and pronoun usage. For instance, ankoatrizay in Merina becomes ny ankoatrany in Marofotsy, notafin’ireo (“they attacked”) becomes noravandreo, and naverin’ireo (“they returned”) becomes naverinandreo.

The use of the ending -ndreo instead of -ireo is a characteristic feature shared with Boina Sakalava.
