= Anjoaty dialect =

Austronesian language of Madagascar

Anjoaty
- Native to: Madagascar
- Ethnicity: Anjoaty
- Native speakers: c. 250,000
- Language family: Austronesian: Malayo-Polynesian; Western Indonesian; Barito; East Barito; Northern Malagasic; Anjoaty
- Writing system: Latin script (Malagasy alphabet)

Language codes
- ISO 639-3: –
- Anjoaty language sample A man reading gospel in Anjoaty dialect from Vohemar in North-eastern Madagascar.

Anjoaty, also known as Sakalava Anjoaty, is a dialect of Malagasy spoken by the Anjoaty people in the city of Vohémar and surrounding areas in northeastern Madagascar.

== Classification ==
Anjoaty is an Austronesian language variety belonging to the Northern Malagasic branch of the Malagasy.

== Geographical distribution ==
The Anjoaty dialect is spoken in and around the city of Vohémar, in the Sava Region of northeastern Madagascar.

== Characteristics ==
Anjoaty shares similarities with northern Malagasy dialects such as Antakarana and Northern Betsimisaraka, but retains distinct lexical and phonological traits.
