= Bezanozano dialect =

Austronesian language of Madagascar

Bezanozano
- Native to: Madagascar
- Ethnicity: Bezanozano
- Native speakers: 257,000
- Language family: Austronesian: Malayo-Polynesian; Western Indonesian; Barito; East Barito; Central-Eastern Malagasic; Plateau Malagasy; Bezanozano
- Writing system: Latin script (Malagasy alphabet)

Language codes
- ISO 639-3: plt
- Glottolog: beza1235
- Linguasphere: 31-LDA-ae

Bezanozano is a dialect of Malagasy spoken by Bezanozano people in Central Madagascar.

== Classification ==
Bezanozano is an Austronesian language part of the Plateau branch of Malagasy language.

== Geographic distribution ==
Bezanozano dialect is spoken in the region of Alaotra Mangoro especially around the district of Moramanga.

== Characteristics ==
The Bezanozano dialect shares many features with both the Merina and Sihanaka. It retains suffixes typical of Merina such as -ka, -tra, and -na.

Like Sihanaka, Bezanozano often uses the nasalized gn (pronounced /ŋ/) in place of n in some words. For example, tragno (house) is used instead of the Merina trano. This gn form has disappeared in Merina but remains in Bezanozano and Sihanaka.

Many Bezanozano words are similar to Merina, but with a provincial pronunciation.

Although the Bezanozano and Antefasy are spoken in geographically distant regions of Madagascar, they display notable lexical similarities. These shared items suggest the existence of an earlier plateau proto-language within the Central-Eastern group, alongside Southern Betsimisaraka, from which these varieties may have descended. For example, the word for needle is filo in Southern Betsimisaraka , instead of fanjaitra as in Standard Malagasy.

Comparative Vocabulary of Bezanozano, Antefasy, and Merina
#	Gloss	Bezanozano	Antefasy	Merina (Standard Malagasy)
1	In the middle	Antenantenany	Ategnantegnany	Afovoany
2	Guys	Gaona	Gaogny	-
3	Paddy rice	Atatra	Atatry, Akotry	Akotry
4	Needle	Filo	Filo, Fanjaitry	Fanjaitra
5	Honey	Tintely	Titely	Tantely
6	Nail (on finger)	Vajankoho	Vazakoho	Hoho
7	Mortar	Leona	Leogny	Laona

== Vocabulary ==
Bezanozano gloss
#	Gloss	Standard Malagasy	Bezanozano
Numbers & Quantity
1	One	Isa / Iray	Isa / Raiky
2	All	Avy	Aby
Intensity & Time
3	Really / Very	Tena	Tegna
4	Still	Mbola	Mbola
Objects & Living Beings
5	Thing	Zavatra	Zavatra
6	Dog	Alika	Amboa
Location & Place
7	Here	Eto	Eto
8	There	Eo	Eo
9	Far	Lavitra	Alavitra
Questions
10	What	Inona	Inona
11	Who	Iza	Iza
Home & Time
12	House	Trano	Tragno
13	Year	Taona	Taona
14	Day	Andro	Andro
15	Friday	Zoma	Azoma
16	Father of Sarobidy	Dadan'i Sarobidy	Dadan'i Sarobidy
Place & Location Phrases
17	In the water	Ao anati-rano	Agnaty rano
18	In Morocco	Any Maroc	Agny Maroc
19	Overseas	Any ivelany	Agny andilambato
20	Still alive	Mbola velona	Mbola velogna
Actions
21	To drink alcohol	Misotro toaka	Mihinagna toaka
22	To cook	Mahandro	Mandro
