= Southern Sakalava dialect =

Austronesian language of Madagascar

Southern Sakalava
- Native to: Madagascar
- Ethnicity: Sakalava
- Language family: Austronesian: Malayo-Polynesian; Western Indonesian; Barito; East Barito; Southern Malagasic; Southern Sakalava
- Writing system: Latin script (Malagasy alphabet)

Language codes
- ISO 639-3: –
- Glottolog: saka1291
- Linguasphere: 31-LDA-da
- Southern Sakalava language sample (Maintirano) An elderly woman recounts, in Southern Sakalava dialect, her experience of being held hostage by bandits in Maintirano. Southern Sakalava language sample (Morondava) A woman recounts, in Southern Sakalava dialect, the desperate search for her missing son, believed to have drowned in a river.

Southern Sakalava is a dialect of Malagasy spoken by the Sakalava from the region of Melaky to Atsimo Andrefana.

== Classification ==
Southern Sakalava belongs to the Austronesian language family and part of the Southern Malagasic subgroup alongside Bara, Tanosy, Masikoro, Tandroy, Mahafaly and Karimbola.

== Characteristics ==
The Southern Sakalava dialect displays several phonological and lexical characteristics that distinguish it from the Merina-based Standard Malagasy. These features are also shared with other southern Malagasy dialects such as Tandroy, Tanosy, Vezo, Mahafaly, and Bara.

One notable feature is the dropping of the final -na in trisyllabic words. For example, tana is used instead of tànana (hand), tanà for tanàna (village), sofy for sofina (ear), and antety for antanety (field), the latter also common in Southern Sakalava.

There is also a tendency to substitute l for d, as in valy for vady (spouse), lily for didy (law, order), and malio for madio (clean). This phonological change is a hallmark of Southern Sakalava and other southern dialects. However, in the Northern Sakalava dialect, the consonant d is retained, and this shift to l does not occur, despite both varieties being spoken by groups identified as Sakalava.

The s following a t is often omitted, producing forms like raty instead of ratsy (bad).

The consonant v may be replaced by b, for example, abo for avo (high).

The consonant z is frequently dropped. Aiza (where) becomes aia. The pronoun izy (he/she) becomes ihy, a form typical of southern dialects such as Mahafaly, Vezo, and Bara.

Words ending in -tra often become -tsy, such as hafatra becoming hafatsy (message), and mandefitra becoming mandefitsy (to tolerate), a pattern consistent with southern Malagasy varieties.

The form anakahy is used for "mine", a feature found in both northern and southern Malagasy dialects.

The Southern Sakalava spoken in Besalampy is transitional between Northern Sakalava and the more southern varieties of Menabe and Atsimo Andrefana. It shares some northern features like the use of ndreky for "and", but is mostly aligned with southern vocabulary.

Comparative Vocabulary of Northern and Southern Sakalava
#	Gloss	Northern Sakalava	Southern Sakalava
1	One	Araiky	Raiky
2	I / Me	Izaho	Izaho
3	All	Jiaby	Iaby
4	You	Anao / Anô	Iha
5	Only / Also / Just	Fôna	Avao
6	If	Raha	Laha
7	And	Ndreky	No
8	Face	Sôra	Tarehy
9	She/He	Izy	Ihy
10	Message	Hafatra	Hafatsy
11	To tolerate	Mandefitra	Mandefitsy
12	Bird	Vorogno	Voro
13	Woman	Manangy	Ampela
14	When	Rehefa	Lafa

== Geographic distribution ==
Southern Sakalava is primarily spoken in the regions of Melaky (also known as Ambongo), Menabe, and northern Atsimo Andrefana. It is the primary dialect of the cities of Morondava, Maintirano, and Besalampy, as well as in the area surrounding the Tsingy de Bemaraha and the Avenue of the Baobabs.

== Vocabulary ==
Conjunctions & Connectors
#	Gloss	Standard Malagasy	Southern Sakalava
1	And	Sy	No

Qualities & Descriptions
#	Gloss	Standard Malagasy	Southern Sakalava
1	Beautiful	Tsara	Soa

Articles
#	Gloss	Standard Malagasy	Southern Sakalava
1	The	Ny	Ty

Prepositions
#	Gloss	Standard Malagasy	Southern Sakalava
1	From	Avy	Baka

Actions & Verbs
#	Gloss	Standard Malagasy	Southern Sakalava
1	To watch	Mijery	Manenty

Natural World
#	Gloss	Standard Malagasy	Southern Sakalava
1	Sky	Lanitra	Lanitry

Time
#	Gloss	Standard Malagasy	Southern Sakalava
1	Year	Taona	Tao

People
#	Gloss	Standard Malagasy	Southern Sakalava
1	Woman	Vehivavy	Ampela
2	Dear	Ry	Lehy

Adverbs
#	Gloss	Standard Malagasy	Southern Sakalava
1	Only / Also	Ihany / Foana	Avao
2	Here	Eto	Etoy / Eto

== See also ==
- Northern Sakalava
- Sakalava people
