= Antambahoaka dialect =

Austronesian language of Madagascar

Antambahoaka
- Fizakana Antembahôky
- Native to: Madagascar
- Ethnicity: Antambahoaka
- Native speakers: 118,000
- Language family: Austronesian: Malayo-Polynesian; Western Indonesian; Barito; East Barito; Central-Eastern Malagasic; Plateau malagasy; Antambahoaka
- Writing system: Latin script (Malagasy alphabet); Sorabe alphabet (historically)

Language codes
- ISO 639-3: plt
- Glottolog: anta1260
- Linguasphere: 31-LDA-ba
- Antambahoaka dialect sample A woman from the commune of Marokarima (Mananjary district) speaking in Antambahoaka dialect, contesting the legitimacy of the newly elected mayor.

Antambahoaka (pronunciation: [an.tam.baˈhu.akə]) is a dialect of Malagasy spoken by the Antambahoaka people in the region of Vatovavy.

== Classification ==
The Antambahoaka dialect is a member of the Austronesian languages family, within the Malayo-Polynesian languages branch. It is part of the Barito languages group, specifically the Eastern Barito subgroup.

Antambahoaka belongs to the Central-Eastern Malagasy dialect cluster and is associated with the Plateau Malagasy division.

== Location ==
Its geographical range corresponds mainly to the administrative districts of Mananjary and Nosy Varika in the Vatovavy Region in Southeastern Madagascar.

== Characteristics ==
The Antambahoaka dialect shares notable linguistic features with the Northern Tanala and Southern Betsimisaraka.

Lexical Comparison between Antambahoaka, Northern Tanala, and Southern Betsimisaraka
Gloss	Antambahoaka	Northern Tanala	Southern Betsimisaraka
one	raika	raika	Iraika
I	iaho	iaho	izaho
we (inclusive)	antsena	antsena	antsena
We (exclusive)	Ahay	Ahay	Zahay
only	mi	avao	mi
all	maro be / aby	maro be / aby	jiaby
to tell	mizaka	mizaka	mizaka
above	agnambo	ambony	agnambo
now	niane	niany	niane

== Vocabulary ==
English	Malagasy standard	Antambahoaka
We/Us	Isika	Antsena
Who	Iza	Zovy
All	Rehetra	Maro be
Also/Only	Ihany koa/Ihany	Mi
That	Izay	Zegny
Like	Ohatrany	Kara
Even	Na	Ndre
If	Raha	Raha/Laha
After	Aoriana	Afara
One	Isa/Iray	Isa/Raika
Fruit	Voa	Isiny
Jackfruit	Ampalibe	Ampalibe
To hide	Afenina	Avony
I love/like	Tiako	Teako
I don't like/love	Tsy tiako	Tsy teako

== Writing System ==
Antambahoaka dialect is one of the Malagasy varieties that were historically written using the Arabic-derived Arabico-Malagasy script, alongside that of the Antemoro and Tanosy. This script was primarily used for magical and divinatory purposes.
