= Merina dialect =

Austronesian dialect of Madagascar

Merina
- Native to: Madagascar
- Ethnicity: Merina people
- Language family: Austronesian: Malayo-Polynesian; Barito; East Barito; Central-Eastern Malagasic; Plateau Malagasy; Merina
- Writing system: Latin script (Malagasy alphabet); Sorabe script (historical)

Language codes
- ISO 639-1: mg
- ISO 639-3: plt
- Glottolog: meri1243
- Merina dialect sample (Itasy) A woman in Miarinarivo (Itasy) speaking Merina dialect with an Itasy accent. Merina dialect sample (Antananarivo) Interview of Anisha, winner of Star Academy, in Merina dialect from Antananarivo.

Merina or Hova is a dialect of the Malagasy language spoken by the Merina people in the province of Antananarivo and to a lesser extent in the region of Betsiboka part of the province of Mahajanga. It forms the basis of Standard Malagasy, which is used in media, administration, and education across Madagascar. Merina refers to the local dialect, while Standard Malagasy is the national standard.

== Classification ==
Merina belongs to the Austronesian language family, within the Malayo-Polynesian branch. It is part of the East Barito subgroup and is especially closely related to the Ma’anyan language of southern Borneo.Within Madagascar, Merina is classified under the Plateaux Malagasy group.

== History ==
In the 19th century, Merina, in its standardized form, became the official language of the Kingdom of Imerina, which controlled two-thirds of Madagascar. During the colonial period, it was used de facto alongside French in the administration. Colonial publications intended for the indigenous population were issued in the Merina dialect. Even the French were encouraged to learn Merina, with public Malagasy language courses established for European civil servants in Tananarive and some provincial towns.

In 1929, the Merina dialect was adopted as a foreign language option in the Baccalauréat, the diploma marking the end of secondary education in the French system. Since Madagascar’s independence, standardized Merina known as Malagasy ofisialy has remained the main official language, despite the continued strong presence of French.

== Geographic distribution ==
Merina is spoken in the following regions:

- Analamanga Region (including Antananarivo)
- Vakinankaratra Region
- Itasy Region
- Betsiboka Region
- Bongolava Region

Each of these regions has its own accents and etymological variations. In the Vakinankaratra region, a distinct dialect closely related to Merina is spoken, which shows strong influence from the Betsileo dialect due to its separate history under the Kingdom of Andratsay. There are also sociolinguistic variations within the Merina dialect. In Antananarivo, differences exist between the urban Merina spoken by the middle and upper classes and the varieties used in the inner-city slums. Additionally, the rural areas surrounding the capital have their own distinct accents.

== Writing system ==
The Merina dialect is written in the Latin script, using a 21-letter alphabet introduced by missionaries in the 19th century. Prior to that, the Sorabe script, an Arabic-derived alphabet, was briefly used during the reign of Radama I. Merina was not the first Malagasy dialect to be written in the Latin script, but it was the first to be fully standardized with a distinct alphabet and grammatical rules. Dictionaries of southern dialects such as Tanosy, Vezo, and Tandroy were mentioned in travel accounts by French and English explorers, but none of these dialects underwent the same level of standardization as Merina.

== Cultural significance ==
Merina holds a prestigious status due to its widespread use in media, government, and education, and it enjoys nationwide recognition. It is understood throughout Madagascar, not merely because of the historical influence of the Kingdom of Imerina. Even tribes in the southern regions historically independent from Imerina rule can generally understand Merina, despite notable lexical and grammatical differences.

== Controversy ==
While officially recognized as Malagasy across the island, the standard language is in reality the speech of the Merina. Non-Merina groups generally continue to use their own dialects, rejecting the notion of a single unified national language modeled after French. This refusal is reinforced by the fact that Merina, particularly those from the capital, are not open to learning other dialects. The Merina dialect itself is sometimes referred to as tenin'ambaniandro or teny Merina.

In the early 1970s, efforts to valorize nationalist culture made the official Malagasy language—effectively the Merina dialect—the language of instruction in schools, replacing French. While Malagasy dialects are mutually intelligible, privileging Merina reinforced a Merina-centric view of their dialect as superior and marginalized speakers of other dialects. This tension culminated in 1972 in Toamasina (Tamatave), when Razanamasy 's wife, a teacher at Rabemananjara College, insulted a student for using Northern Betsimisaraka words instead of standard Merina Malagasy, treating the local dialect as inferior. This incident triggered riots against the institutionalization of Merina in schools, during which merchants' stalls were burned and looted, and around six thousand Merina fled the city.

== See also ==
- Malagasy language
- Merina people
- Languages of Madagascar
