= Antemanambondro =

Variety of Malagasy

- Native to: Madagascar
- Ethnicity: Antemanambondro
- Native speakers: 94000 (2025)
- Language family: Austronesian: Malayo-Polynesian; Western Indonesian; Barito; East Barito; Central-Eastern Malagasic; Sahafatra-Antesaka; Antemanambondro
- Writing system: Latin script (Malagasy alphabet)

Language codes
- ISO 639-3: tkg

Antemanambondro is a variety of Malagasy spoken by the Antemanambondro people, closely related to the Antesaka dialect.

== Classification ==
Antemanambondro is a dialect of Malagasy, which belongs to the Austronesian language family. It is classified within the Central-Eastern branch, under the Sahafatra–Antesaka group.

== Geographical distribution ==
The dialect is spoken in the Atsimo-Atsinanana region, primarily from the commune of Manambondro up to Manantenina, which marks the beginning of the Tanosy dialect area.

== Characteristics ==
Antemanambondro is a transitional Malagasy dialect bridging Antesaka and Tanosy. While essentially identical to Antesaka and likely a dialect of it, Antemanambondro features unique lexical items not found in Antesaka, such as fia for "fish" and ampela for "woman" (where Antesaka uses laokandrano or vily and viavy, respectively).
