= Vezo dialect =

Austronesian language of Madagascar

Vezo
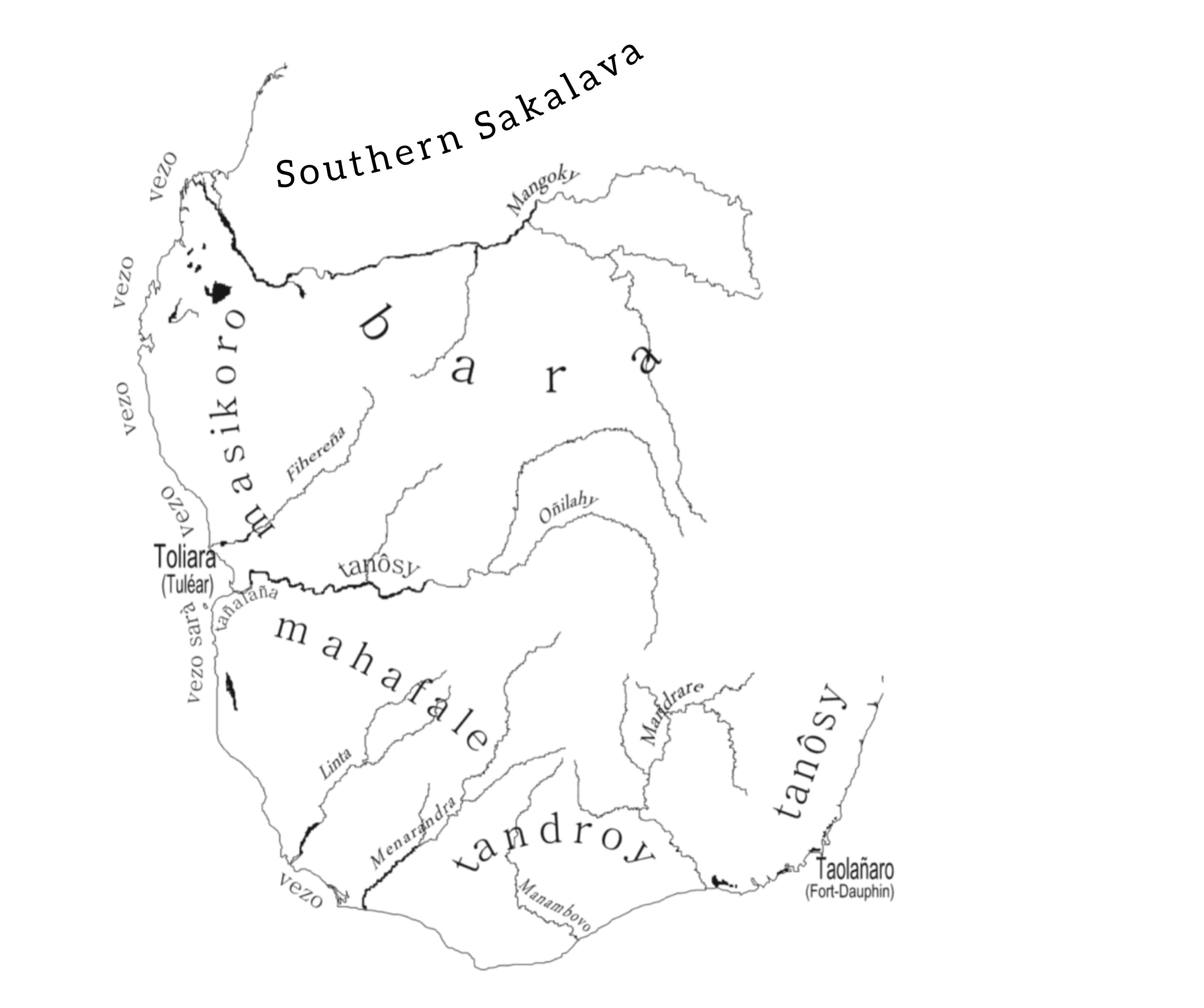
- Map showing the Southern Malagasic dialect group, including Vezo
- Native to: Madagascar
- Ethnicity: Vezo
- Native speakers: 386,000
- Language family: Austronesian: Malayo-Polynesian; Western Indonesian; Barito; East Barito; Southern malagasy; Vezo
- Writing system: Latin script (Malagasy alphabet)

Language codes
- ISO 639-3: –
- Glottolog: vezo1235
- Linguasphere: 31-LDA-ce

Vezo is a dialect of Malagasy spoken by Vezo in the provinces of Mahajanga and Toliara. It is among southern dialects of Malagasy along with Southern Sakalava, Masikoro, Tandroy, Mahafaly,Bara and Tanosy.

== Classification ==
Vezo dialect belongs to the Austronesian language family. Vezo language is very close to Southern sakalava and Masikoro.

== Geographic distribution ==
The Vezo dialect is predominantly spoken by the nomadic Vezo ethnic group and is the primary dialect in the city of Toliara. It is mainly used along the coastal areas of Atsimo-Andrefana, Menabe, and Androy.

== Vocabulary ==
=== Numerals ===
English	Malagasy Standard	Vezo
One	Iray / Isa	Iraiky / Isa
Two	Roa	Roa
Three	Telo	Telo
Four	Efatra	Efatra
Five	Dimy	Dimy / Limy
Six	Enina	Enina
Seven	Fito	Fito
Eight	Valo	Valo
Nine	Sivy	Sivy
Ten	Folo	Folo
Hundred	Zato	Zato
Thousand	Arivo	Arivo raiky
Ten thousand	Iray alina	Ray aly
One hundred thousand	Iray hetsy	Ray hetsy
One million	Tapitrisa	Tapitrisa
One billion	Lavitrisa	Lavitrisa

=== Animals ===
English	Malagasy Standard	Vezo
Animal	Biby	Biby
Bird	Vorona	Voro
Fish	Trondro	Fia
Chicken	Akoho	Akoho
Cow	Omby	Aomby
Ant	Vitsika	Vitiky
Tortoise	Sokatra	Sokaky
Octopus	Horita	Horita
Goose	Gisa	Gisa
Crab	Drakaka	Drakaky
Goat	Osy	Aosy
Serpent	Bibilava	Bibilava
Sheep	Ondry	Aondry
Shrimp	Orana	Tsitsiky
Tiger	Tigra	Tigra

=== Direction ===
English	Malagasy Standard	Vezo
East	Atsinanana	Antsinanana
West	Andrefana	Andrefa
North	Avaratra	Avaratsy
South	Atsimo	Antsimo

=== Interrogative words ===
English	Malagasy Standard	Vezo
What?	Inona?	Ino?
Who?	Iza?	Ia?
Where?	Aiza?	Aia?
Why?	Nahoana?	Nahoa?

=== Time ===
English	Malagasy Standard	Vezo
Yesterday	Omaly	Nomaly
Today	Androany	Androany
Tomorrow	Rahampitso	Amaray
Month	Volana	Volana

=== Fruits and Vegetables ===
English	Malagasy Standard	Vezo
Avocado	Zavoka	Zavôka
Banana	Akondro	Kida
Bean	Tsaramaso	Tsaramaso
Carrot	Karôty	Karôty
Cassava	Mangahazo	Balahazo
Chinese cabbage	Petsay	Sidesiny
Coconut	Voanio	Coco
Corn	Katsaka	Tsako
Cucumber	Concombre	Kôkômbry
Eggplant	Baranjely	Baranjely
Grape	Voaloboka	Voaloboky
Guava	Goavy	Goavy
Lychee	Litchi	Letisy
Onion	Tongolo	Tongolo
Papaya	Papay	Papay
Pineapple	Mananasy	Mananasy
Potato	Ovy	Pômedetera
Rice	Vary	Vary
Sugar cane	Fary	Fosiky
Sweet potato	Vomanga	Belehy
Tomato	Voatabia	Tamatesy

=== Expressions ===
English	Malagasy Standard	Vezo
Where do you live ?	Aiza anao no mipetraka ?	Aia anao mipetraka ?
I live in Atsinengeha	Izaho dia mipetraka any Atsinengeha	Izaho mipetraka Atsinengeha
How old are you ?	Firy taona anao ?	Firy tao anao?
I am 9 years old	Sivy taona izaho	Izaho sivy tao
Where are you from ?	Avy aiza anao ?	Baka aia anao?
I am from Toliara	Avy any Toliary izaho	Izaho baka Toliara
I can speak English and Vezo language	Mahay miteny angilisy sy Vezo izaho	Izaho mahay mivola teny angilisy no vezo
