= Malagasy language =

Austronesian language of Madagascar

Malagasy
- malagasy / مَلَغَسِ
- Native to: Madagascar; Mayotte
- Ethnicity: Malagasy
- Native speakers: 25 million
- Language family: Austronesian: Malayo-Polynesian; Western Indonesian; Barito; East Barito; Malagasy
- Early forms: Proto-Austronesian: Proto-Malayo-Polynesian; Proto-Barito; Proto-East Barito; Proto-Malagasy
- Standard forms: Standard Malagasy
- Dialects: Central-Eastern: Plateaux Malagasy; Merina-Vakinankaratra; Merina; Standard Malagasy; Inner City Merina; Vakinankaratra; Marofotsy; Betsileo; Bezanozano; Sihanaka; Antemoro-Antefasy; Sahavoay; Antemoro; Antefasy; Zafisoro; Antambahoaka; Tanala; Sahafatra-Antesaka; Antemanambondro; Sahafatra; Antesaka; Southern Betsimisaraka; Southern: Vezo-Sakalava; Southern Sakalava; Vezo; Masikoro; Mikea; Tandroy; Karimbola; Mahafaly; Bara; Antanosy; Northern: Northern Sakalava; Kibushi; Kibushi Kimaore; Kibushi Kiantalaotsy; Sakalava Anjoaty; Antakarana; Tsimihety; Northern Betsimisaraka
- Writing system: Latin script (Malagasy alphabet); Sorabe alphabet (historically); Malagasy Braille

Official status
- Official language in: Madagascar

Language codes
- ISO 639-1: mg
- ISO 639-2: mlg
- ISO 639-3: mlg – inclusive code Individual codes: xmv – Antankarana bhr – Bara buc – Bushi msh – Masikoro bmm – Northern Betsimisaraka plt – Plateau Malagasy skg – Sakalava bzc – Southern Betsimisaraka tdx – Tandroy-Mafahaly txy – Tanosy tkg – Tesaka xmw – Tsimihety
- Glottolog: mala1537
- Linguasphere: 31-LDA-a
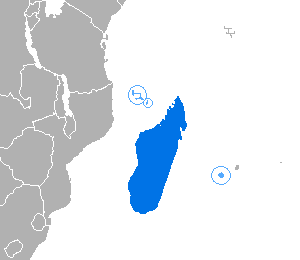
- Extent of the Malagasy language

A woman speaking Malagasy (1:32)

Malagasy (/ˌmæləˈɡæsi/ MAL-ə-GASS-ee; Malagasy pronunciation: [malaˈɡasʲ]; Sorabe: مَلَغَسِ) is an Austronesian language and dialect continuum spoken in Madagascar. The standard variety, called Official Malagasy, is one of the official languages of Madagascar, alongside French.

Malagasy is the westernmost Austronesian language, brought to Madagascar with the settlement of Austronesian speakers from the Sunda Islands (about 7,300 kilometres or 4,500 miles away) around the 5th century AD or perhaps between the 7th and 13th centuries. The Malagasy language is one of the Barito languages and is most closely related to the Maʼanyan language, still spoken on Borneo. Malagasy also includes numerous Malay loanwords from the time of the early Austronesian settlement and trading between Madagascar and the Sunda Islands. After c. 1000 AD, Malagasy incorporated numerous Bantu and Arabic loanwords brought over by traders and new settlers.

Malagasy is spoken by around 25 million people in Madagascar and the Comoros. Most people in Madagascar speak it as a first language, as do some people of Malagasy descent elsewhere. Malagasy is divided in dozen dialects between three main dialect groups: Northern Malagasic, Central-Eastern Malagasic and Southern Malagasic. The central plateau of the island, where the capital Antananarivo and the old heartland of the Merina Kingdom is located, speaks the Merina dialect. The Merina dialect is the basis of Standard Malagasy, which is used by the government and media in Madagascar. Standard Malagasy is one of two official languages of Madagascar alongside French, in the 2010 constitution of the Fourth Republic of Madagascar.

Malagasy is written in the Latin script, which was introduced by Western missionaries in the early 19th century. Previously, the Sorabe script was used, a local development of the Arabic script.

== Classification ==
The Malagasy language is the westernmost (Hesperonesian) member of the Austronesian language family, a grouping that is closely related to the Western Indonesian languages.

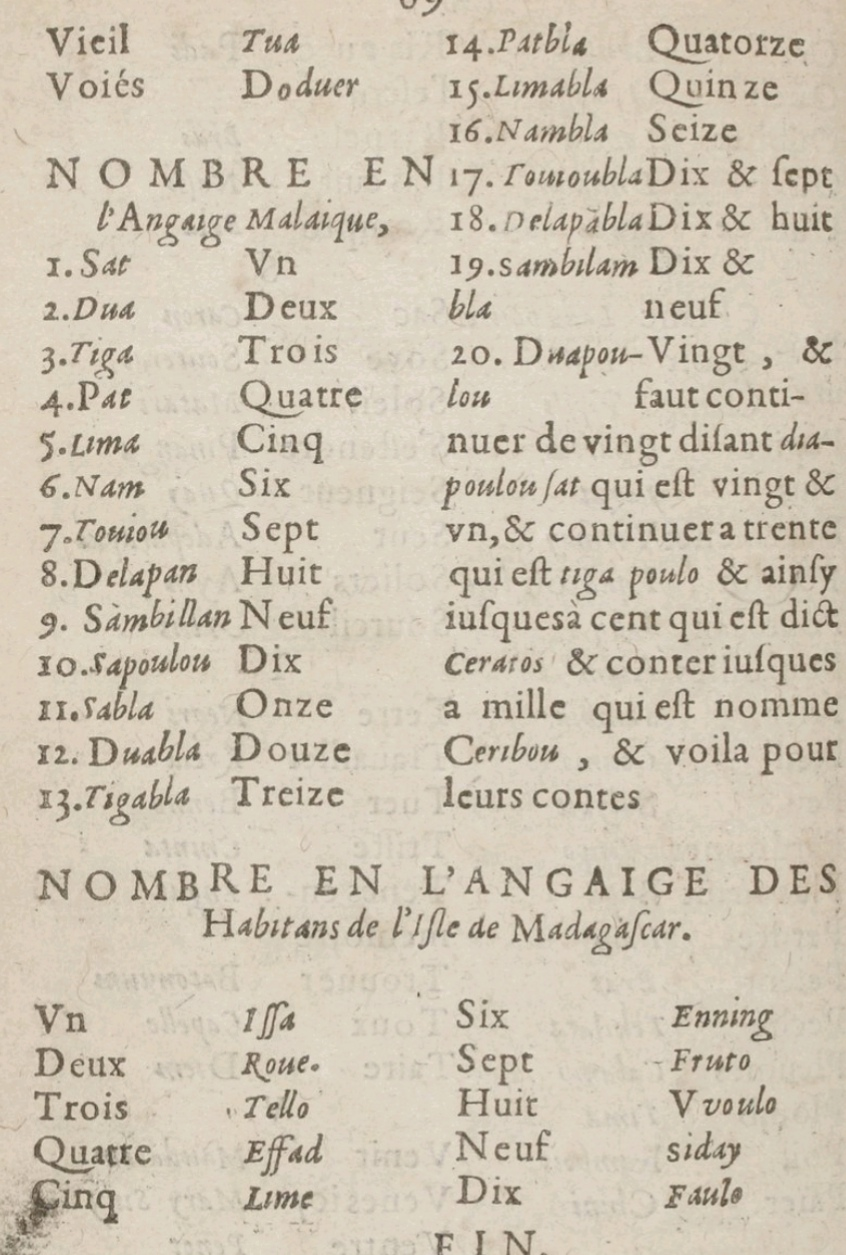
The comparison between numbers in Eastern Sumatran (Malay) and Malagasy by De Vitré during his voyage to the colonial Maritime Southeast Asia (East Indies) in 1603

Similarities between Malagasy and Eastern Sumatran (Malay) had been observed since the 17th century and Malagasy's relation with other Austronesian languages had already been noted by early scholars, such as the Dutch scholar Adriaan Reland in 1708.

Among all Austronesian languages, Dahl (1951) demonstrated that Malagasy and Maʼanyan Dayak – an East Barito language natively spoken in Central Kalimantan (Indonesia) on the island of Kalimantan – were particularly closely related. Furthermore, there appears to be a Bantu influence or substratum in Malagasy phonotactics (Dahl 1988). There are some Sanskrit loanwords in Malagasy, which are said to have been borrowed via Javanese (mainly).

Adelaar (1995) suggested that the vocabulary of Malagasy also contains many words that are of South Sulawesi-origin (especially Makassar) . Further evidence for this suggestion was presented by Blench (2018).

Decimal numbers	1	2	3	4	5	6	7	8	9	10
Proto-Austronesian (hypothetical reconstruction)	*isa	*duSa	*telu	*Sepat	*lima	*enem	*pitu	*walu	*Siwa	*puluq
Malagasy	iray/isa	roa	telo	efatra	dimy	enina	fito	valo	sivy	solo
Maʼanyan Dayak	isa	rueh / rue	telo	epat	dime	enem	pitu	balu	su'ey	sapulu
Deyah Dayak	erai	duo	tolu	opat	dimo	onom	turu	walu	sié	sepuluh
Kadazan	iso	duvo	tohu	apat	himo	onom	tu'u	vahu	sizam	hopod
Dusun	iso	duo	tolu	apat	limo	onom	turu	walu	siam	hopod
Waray-Waray	usá	duhá	tuló	upát	limá	unóm	pitó	waló	siyám	napúlo
Tagalog	isá	dalawá	tatló	ápat	limá	ánim	pitó	waló	siyám	sampu
Hiligaynon	isa	duha	tatlu	apat	lima	anum	pito	walu	siyam	pulo
Kinaray-a	sara	darwa	tatlo	apat	lima	anəm	pito	walo	siyam	pulû
Cebuano	usá	duhá	tuló	upát	limá	unóm	pitó	waló	siyám	napúlo
Ilocano	maysá	dua	talló	uppát	limá	inném	pitó	waló	siam	sangapúlo
Chamorro	maisa/håcha	hugua	tulu	fatfat	lima	gunum	fiti	guålu	sigua	månot/fulu
Javanese	siji/esa/satunggal	loro	telu	papat	lima	enem	pitu	walu	sanga	sepuluh
Kangean	hetong	dua	telo	empa	lema	enem	peto	belu	sanga	hapoloh
Sundanese	hiji	dua	tilu	opat	lima	genep	tujuh	dalapan	salapan	sapuluh
Indonesian	satu / esa	dua	tiga	empat	lima	enam	tujuh	delapan	sembilan	sepuluh
Malay	satu	due	tige	empat	lime	enam	tujoh	lapan	semilan	sepuloh
Tetum	ida	rua	tolu	haat	lima	neen	hitu	ualu	sia	sanulu
Fijian	dua	rua	tolu	vā	lima	ono	vitu	walu	ciwa	tini, -sagavulu
Tongan	taha	ua	tolu	fā	nima	ono	fitu	valu	hiva	-fulu
Samoan	tasi	lua	tolu	fa	lima	ono	fitu	valu	iva	sefulu
Maori	tahi	rua	toru	whā	rima	ono	whitu	waru	iwa	tekau
Hawaiian	kahi	lua	kolu	hā	lima	ono	hiku	walu	iwa	ʻumi

However, the diversity of Malagasy dialects does not correspond to the genetic diversity of the populations. For example, the Merina, who often show a relatively high proportion of Austronesian ancestry (more than 50–60% according to several studies), nevertheless use certain words of African origin such as mamba 'crocodile' or osy 'goat'. Conversely, several coastal populations, whose proportion of Asian ancestry is generally lower (around 30–40%), do not always use these terms and instead retain Austronesian words absent from the Merina vocabulary, such as voay or bengy.

Regional Vocabulary Not Found in Merina And Austronesian Parallels
Malagasy word	Malagasy specific dialect	Closest Austronesian form	Austronesian language	Gloss
mamo	Antefasy Malagasy	mamu	Maʼanyan Dayak	Mosquito
masakaly	Antefasy Malagasy	cacar	Javanese	smallpox / rash
atsikora	Antefasy Malagasy	kōuraura	Maori	shrimp
kiringy	Antefasy Malagasy	keriting	Javanese	curly
hohy	Antefasy Malagasy	huelo	Hawaiian	tail
laoko	Northern Malagasy dialects	lauk	Sundanese	fish
laokandrano	Antefasy Malagasy / Antemoro Malagasy	lauk	Sundanese	fish
tali	Southern Malagasy dialects	tali	Javanese	rope
mikaiky	Northern Malagasy dialects	Kaeha	Hawaiian	to call
fia	Southern Malagasy dialect	i'a	Samoan / Hawaiian	fish

== Etymology ==
Malagasy is the demonym of Madagascar, from which it is taken to refer to the people of Madagascar in addition to their language.

== History ==
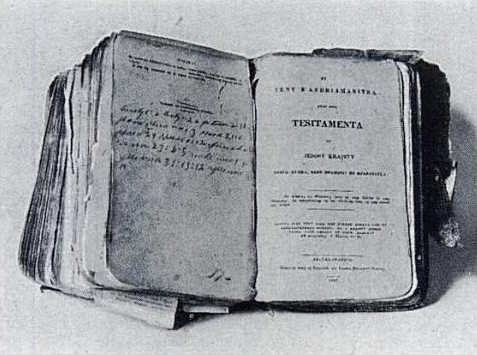
Malagasy Bible

Madagascar was first settled by Austronesian peoples from Maritime Southeast Asia from the Sunda Islands (Malay archipelago). As for their route, one possibility is that the Indonesian Austronesian came directly across the Indian Ocean from Java to Madagascar. It is likely that they went through the Maldives, where evidence of old Indonesian boat design and fishing technology persists until the present. The migrations continued along the first millennium, as confirmed by linguistic researchers who showed the close relationship between the Malagasy language and Old Malay and Old Javanese languages of this period. The Malagasy language originates from the Southeast Barito languages, and the Ma'anyan language is its closest relative, with numerous Malay and Javanese loanwords. It is known that Ma'anyan people were brought as labourers and slaves by Malay and Javanese people in their trading fleets, which reached Madagascar by c. 50–500 AD. Later, c. 1000, the original Austronesian settlers mixed with Bantus and Arabs, amongst others. There is evidence that the predecessors of the Malagasy dialects first arrived in the southern stretch of the east coast of Madagascar. Adelaar (2017) proposes that a distinct Malagasy speech community had already been established in South Borneo before the early Malagasy speakers migrated to East Africa.

Malagasy has a tradition of oratory arts and poetic histories and legends. The most well-known is the national epic, Ibonia, about a Malagasy folk hero of the same name.

== Geographic distribution ==
Malagasy is the principal language spoken on the island of Madagascar. It is also spoken by Malagasy communities on neighboring Indian Ocean islands such as Réunion, Mayotte and Mauritius. Expatriate Malagasy communities speaking the language also exist in Europe and North America.

== Legal status ==
The Merina dialect of Malagasy is considered the national language of Madagascar. It is one of two official languages alongside French in the 2010 constitution put in place the Fourth Republic. Previously, under the 2007 constitution, Malagasy was one of three official languages alongside French and English. Malagasy is the language of instruction in all public schools through grade five for all subjects, and remains the language of instruction through high school for the subjects of history and Malagasy language.

== Dialects ==
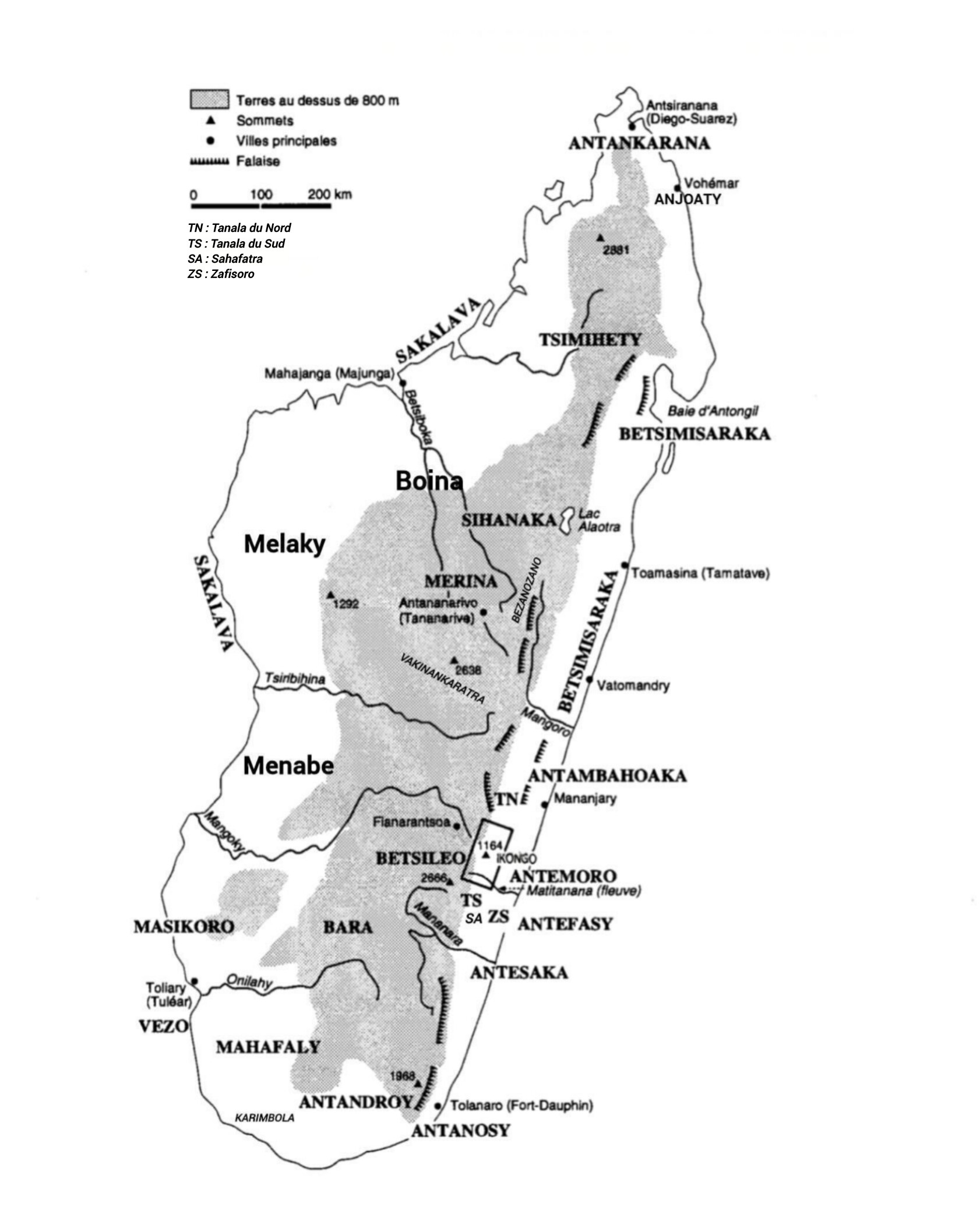
Ethno-linguistic map of Madagascar

In his 1658 work Histoire de la grande isle Madagascar, Étienne de Flacourt provided one of the earliest known attempts to classify the Malagasy language into dialectal regions. He divided Malagasy into two main dialect groups: northern and southern. He noted significant lexical differences between them — for instance, the word ampela was used in the south to mean 'woman' or 'girl', while vaiavy was used in the north. Similarly, baba was a northern term for 'father', whereas ray was used in the south.

Flacourt also observed phonological variations. He noted similarities between the Tanosy and Antemoro dialects, especially their shared use of the [ts] sound in words like fotsy 'white'. In contrast, in the Masikoro and Mahafaly dialects, the [ts] sound is often replaced by [t], producing foty for the same meaning.

Malagasy dialects can be divided into northern, central-eastern, and southern groups. Northern dialects (Kibushi, Northern Sakalava, Antakarana, Tsimihety, Northern Betsimisaraka) are heavily influenced by Swahili and French. Northern Malagasy speakers pronounce the vowel o like the English vowel in "cold," orthographically written ô. Examples include vôalôhagny ('first'), nôsy ('island'), talôha ('before'), mitôndra ('to carry'), vôlagna ('moon; month'), and sôla ('bald').

Non-Northern Malagasy speakers pronounce the same vowel o like the English "oo" in "food", as in voalohany, nosy, mitondra, volana, and sola.

Southern Malagasy dialects, including Tandroy, Southern Sakalava, Tanosy, and Bara, reflect conservative phonology and can phonetically resemble Polynesian languages. They also use a progressive or ascending numeral system, where the smaller unit is added after the base (e.g., folo raik'amby → literally '10 + 1'), in contrast with other Malagasy dialects that use a retrograde or descending system (e.g., iraika ambin'ny folo → literally '1 over 10').

For example, the word linta ('leech') corresponds to Malay lintah, taly ('rope') corresponds to Malay tali, and limy ('five') corresponds to Malay lima, whereas in other dialects it appears as dinta, tady, and dimy.

Central-Eastern subgroup which contains Antesaka, Sahafatra, Southern Betsimisaraka and Plateau dialects like Antefasy, Antambahoaka, Vakinankaratra, Sihanaka, Merina (basis of Standard Malagasy) constitutes an intermediate group, with a structure and vocabulary largely close to standard Malagasy, and with influence sometimes coming from either the northern or southern branches.

Although considered a single ethnic group, the Sakalava speak at least two distinct dialects. The Southern Sakalava dialect is more closely related to Masikoro, while the Northern Sakalava dialect shares linguistic features with the Tsimihety dialect. The Betsimisaraka also demonstrate internal dialectal variation: the Northern Betsimisaraka dialect is closer to Tsimihety, whereas the Southern variant is more similar to Antambahoaka.

=== Tree list of Malagasy dialects ===
- Proto-Malagasy
  - Central-Eastern Malagasic
    - Plateaux Malagasy
      - Merina-Vakinankaratra
        - Merina
          - Standard Malagasy
          - Inner City Merina
        - Vakinankaratra
        - Marofotsy
      - Betsileo
      - Bezanozano
      - Sihanaka
      - Antemoro-Antefasy
        - Sahavoay
        - Antemoro
        - Antefasy
        - Zafisoro
      - Antambahoaka
      - Tanala
    - Sahafatra-Antesaka
      - Antemanambondro
      - Sahafatra
      - Antesaka
    - Southern Betsimisaraka
  - Southern Malagasic
    - Vezo-Sakalava
      - Southern Sakalava
      - Vezo
      - Masikoro
      - Mikea
    - Tandroy
    - Karimbola
    - Mahafaly
    - Bara
    - Antanosy
  - Northern Malagasic
    - Northern Sakalava
      - Kibushi
        - Kibushi Kimaore
        - Kibushi Kiantalaotsy
    - Sakalava Anjoaty
    - Antakarana
    - Tsimihety
    - Northern Betsimisaraka

Comparative vocabulary of major Malagasy dialects
#	Gloss	Northern	Central eastern	Southern
1	One	araika/araiky	iray/raika/raiky	raiky
2	Two	aroa/aroe	roa/roy	roa
3	You	anô	anao	iha
4	He/She / Him/Her	izy	izy	ihy
5	Only	fô	ihany/avao	avao
6	Girl	manangy/vaiavy	vehivavy	ampela
7	Fire	môtro	afo	afo
8	Earth	donia	tany	tany
9	Little	hely	kely	kely
10	White	malandy	fotsy	fotsy
11	Black	jôby	mainty	mainty
12	Good	tsara	tsara/soa	soa
13	Fish	lôko	trondro	fia
14	Face	sôra	tarehy	tarehy
15	Dog	amboa/fandroaka	amboa/alika	amboa
16	Love	fitia	fitiavana	fitiava
17	Suffering	jaly	fijaliana	fijalia
18	And	ndreky	sy	no
19	Message	hafatra	hafatra	hafatsy
20	To go/come back	mody	mody	moly
21	To sell	mivarotro	mivarotra	mivarotsy
22	Gone	lôso	lasa	lasa

Inspired by Gabriel Ferrand's book Essai de phonétique comparée du malais et des dialectes malgaches, published in 1909, Glottolog divides Malagasy into two principal dialect zones: Eastern (including Merina) and Western (including Sakalava), with an isogloss running roughly down the central spine of the island. In this model, the southern region is classified as Western, while the central plateau and much of the north (excluding the far northern tip) are considered Eastern.

This binary classification is now widely viewed as outdated. It overlooks crucial grammatical, phonological, and lexical distinctions among Malagasy dialects. For example, Northern Betsimisaraka shares features with Northern Sakalava, placing it closer to western varieties, while Southern Betsimisaraka remains a typically eastern dialect. Similarly, dialects such as Tanosy, although traditionally grouped in the east, show structural and etymological affinities with western dialects like Bara and Southern Sakalava.

Ethnologue identifies 12 major varieties of Malagasy and treats them as separate languages. It distinguishes between dialects such as Northern and Southern Betsimisaraka, and between Northern and Southern Sakalava, which is a step toward acknowledging internal diversity. However, it still fails to represent the full diversity of the dialect continuum in Madagascar. In reality, more than more than 20 dialects are spoken, many of which are entirely absent from Glottolog and Ethnologue. Dialects such as Sakalava Anjoaty, Karimbola, and Sahavoay are completely neglected.

The following is the classification of Malagasy dialects according to Ethnologue:

The Eastern dialects are:

- Northern Betsimisaraka Malagasy (1,270,000 speakers) – spoken by the Betsimisaraka on the northeastern coast of the island
- Southern Betsimisaraka Malagasy (2,000,000 speakers) – spoken by the Betsimisaraka in the North of the region Vatovavy Fito Vinany.
- Plateau (Merina) Malagasy (10,893,000 speakers) – spoken in the centre of the island.
- Tanosy Malagasy (639,000 speakers) – spoken by the Antanosy people in the south of the island.
- Tesaka Malagasy (1,130,000 speakers) – spoken by the Antaisaka people in the southeast of the island.

The Western dialects are:

- Antankarana Malagasy (156,000 speakers) – spoken by the Antankarana in the northern tip of the island.
- Bara Malagasy (724,000 speakers) – spoken by the Bara people in the south of the island
- Masikoro Malagasy (550,000 speakers) – spoken by the Masikoro in the southwest of the island.
- Sakalava Malagasy (1,210,000 speakers) – spoken by the Sakalava people on the western coast of the island.
- Tandroy-Mahafaly Malagasy (1,300,000 speakers) – spoken by the Antandroy and the Mahafaly people on the southern tip of the island
- Tsimihety Malagasy (1,615,000 speakers) – spoken by the Tsimihety people.

Additionally, the Bushi dialect (41,700 speakers) is spoken on the French overseas territory of Mayotte, which is part of the Comoro island chain situated northwest of Madagascar.

== Writing system ==
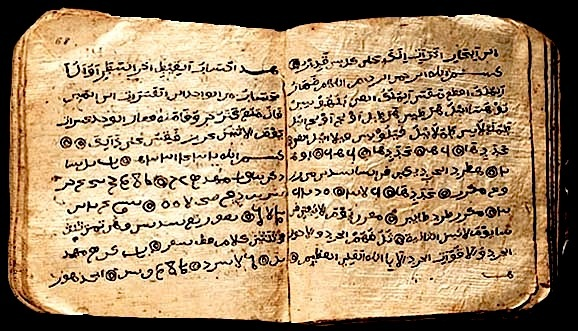
Sorabe Malagasy Arabic script

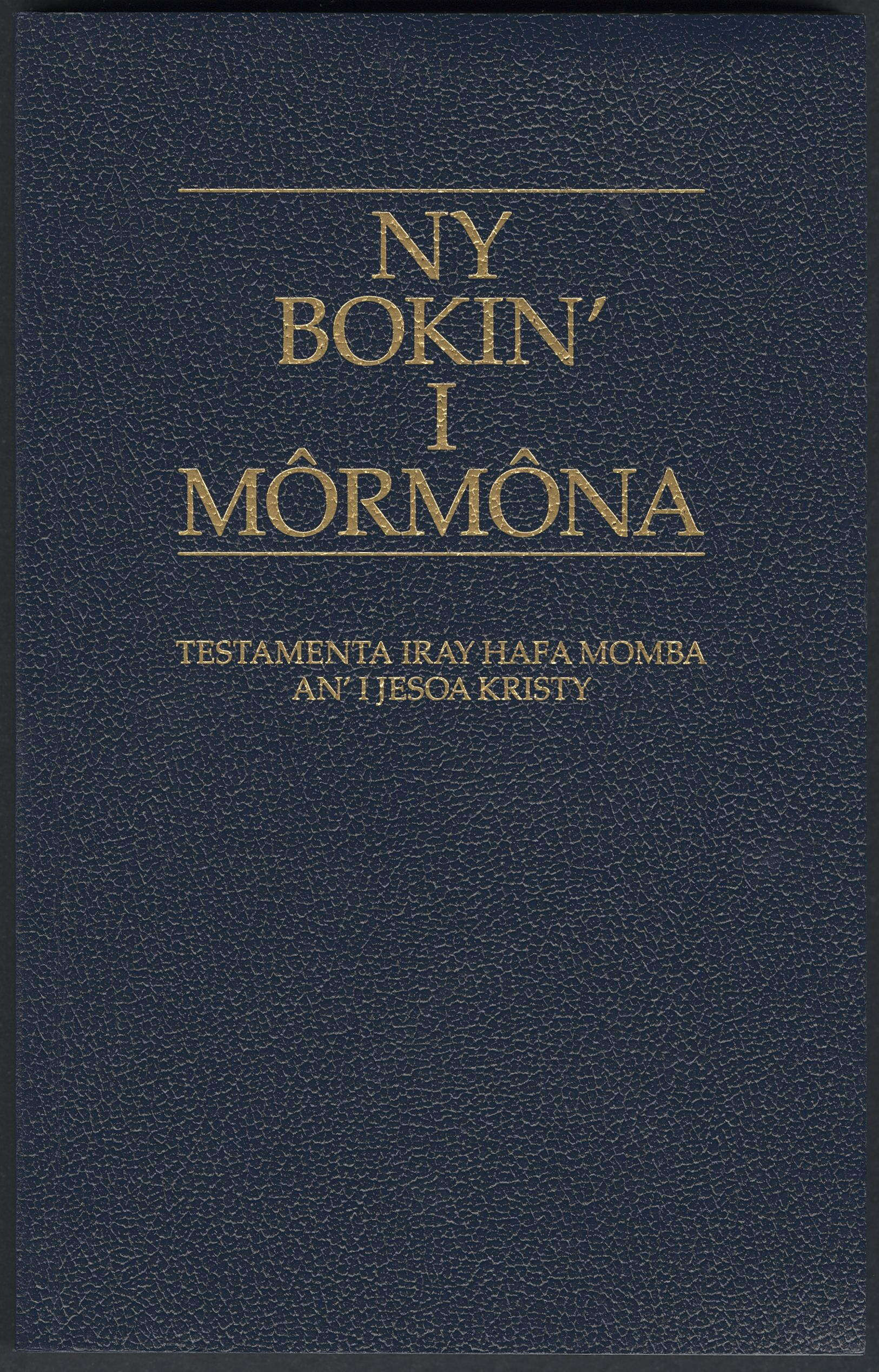
Malagasy version of the Book of Mormon, in Latin script with the letter ô

The language has a written literature going back presumably to the 15th century. When the French established Fort-Dauphin in the 17th century, they found an Arabico-Malagasy script in use, known as Sorabe ("large writings"). This Arabic-derived Sorabe alphabet was mainly used for astrological and magical texts. The oldest known manuscript in that script is a short Malagasy-Dutch vocabulary from the early 17th century, which was first published in 1908 by Gabriel Ferrand though the script must have been introduced into the southeast area of Madagascar in the 15th century.

The first bilingual renderings of religious texts are those by Étienne de Flacourt, who also published the first dictionary of the language. Radama I, the first literate representative of the Merina monarchy, though extensively versed in the Arabico-Malagasy tradition, opted in 1823 for a Latin system derived by David Jones and invited the Protestant London Missionary Society to establish schools and churches. The first book to be printed in Malagasy using Latin characters was the Bible, which was translated into Malagasy in 1835 by British Protestant missionaries working in the highlands area of Madagascar.

The current Malagasy alphabet consists of 21 letters: a, b, d, e, f, g, h, i, j, k, l, m, n, o, p, r, s, t, v, y, z. The orthography maps rather straightforwardly to the phonemic inventory. The letters i and y both represent the /i/ sound (y is used word-finally, and i elsewhere), while o is pronounced /u/ (except in the northern dialects, where it corresponds to /o/). The affricates /ʈʂ/ and /ɖʐ/ are written tr and dr, respectively, while /ts/ and /dz/ are written ts and j. The letter h is often silent. All other letters have essentially their IPA values. The letters c, q, u, w and x are not part of the Malagasy alphabet, but are used in some foreign loanwords.

Mp and occasionally nt may begin a word, but they are pronounced /p, t/.

@ is used informally as a short form for amin'ny, which is a preposition followed by the definite form, meaning for instance 'with the'.

Sorabe alphabet with corresponding Latin Letters
Isolated	Final	Medial	Initial	IPA	Modern Latin
ا	ـا		ا	/ʔ/	-
ب	ـب	ـبـ	بـ	/b, ᵐb/	b/mb
ت	ـة	ـتـ	تـ	/ts, ⁿts/	ts/nts
ج	ـج	ـجـ	جـ	/dz, ⁿdz/	j/nj
ڊ	ـڊ		ڊ	/d/	d
ر	ـر		ر	/r/	r
رّ	ـرّ		رّ	/ɖʳ, ᶯɖʳ, ʈʳ, ᶯʈʳ/	dr/ndr/tr/ntr
س	ـس	ـسـ	سـ	/s/	s
ࢋ	ـࢋ	ـࢋـ	ࢋـ	/t, ⁿt/	t/nt
ع	ـع	ـعـ	عـ	/ŋ/	n̈
غ	ـغ	ـغـ	غـ	/g, ᵑɡ/	g/ng
ٯ	ـٯ	ـڧـ	ڧـ	/f/	f
ٯّ	ـٯّ	ـڧّـ	ڧّـ	/p, ᵐp/	p/mp
ك	ـك	ـكـ	كـ	/k, ᵑk/	k/nk
ل	ـل	ـلـ	لـ	/l/	l
م	ـم	ـمـ	مـ	/m/	m
ن	ـن	ـنـ	نـ	/n/	n
و	ـو		و	/v/	v
ه	ـه	ـهـ	هـ	/h/	h
ي	ـي	ـيـ	يـ	/z/	z

=== Diacritics ===
Diacritics are not obligatory in standard Malagasy, except in the case where its absence leads to an ambiguity: tanàna 'city' must have the diacritic to discriminate itself from tanana 'hand'. They may however be used in the following ways:

- ◌̀ (grave accent) shows the stressed syllable in a word. It is frequently used for disambiguation. For instance in tanàna 'city' and tanana 'hand', where the word that is an exception to the usual pronunciation rules (tanàna) gets an accent. Using the accent on the word that follows the pronunciation rules (tànana) is less common, mainly in dictionaries. (This is very similar to the usage of the grave accent in Italian.)
- ◌́ (acute accent) may be used in
  - very old dictionaries, along with grave accent
  - dialects such as Bara
  - French (Tuléar) and French-spelled (Antsirabé) names. Malagasy versions are Toliara or Toliary and Antsirabe.
- ◌̂ (circumflex) is used as follows:
  - ô shows that the letter is pronounced /o/ and not /u/, in Malagasified foreign words (hôpitaly) and dialects (Tôlan̈aro). In standard Malagasy, ao or oa (as in mivoaka) is used instead.
  - sometimes the single-letter words a and e are written â and ê but it does not change the pronunciation
- ◌̈ (diaeresis) is used with n̈ in dialects for a velar nasal /ŋ/. Examples are place names such as Tôlan̈aro, Antsiran̈ana, Iharan̈a, Anantson̈o. This can be seen in maps from FTM, the national institute of geodesy and cartography.
- ◌̃ (tilde) is used in ñ sometimes, perhaps when the writer cannot produce an n̈ (although ng is also used in such cases). In Ellis' Bara dialect dictionary, it is used for velar nasal /ŋ/ as well as palatal nasal /ɲ/.

== Phonology ==
=== Vowels ===
	Front	Central	Back
Close	i ⟨i, y⟩		u ⟨o⟩
Mid	e ⟨e⟩	(ə)	o ⟨ô, ao, oa⟩
Open	a ⟨a⟩		

After a stressed syllable, as at the end of most words and in the final two syllables of some, /a, u, i/ are reduced to [ə, ʷ, ʲ]. (/i/ is spelled ⟨y⟩ in such cases, though in monosyllabic words like ny and vy, ⟨y⟩ is pronounced as a full [i].) Final /a/, and sometimes final syllables, are devoiced at the end of an utterance. /e/ and /o/ are never reduced or devoiced. The large number of reduced vowels, and their effect on neighbouring consonants, give Malagasy a phonological quality like Portuguese's.

/o/ is marginal in Merina dialect, found in interjections and loan words, though it is also found in place names from other dialectical areas. /ai, au/ are diphthongs [ai̯, au̯] in careful speech, [e, o] or [ɛ, ɔ] in more casual speech. /ai/, whichever way it is pronounced, affects following /k, ɡ/ as /i/ does.

=== Consonants ===
			Labial	Dental	Alveolar	Retroflex	Velar	Glottal
Nasal			m ⟨m⟩		n ⟨n⟩		ŋ ⟨n̈⟩	
Plosive and affricate	voiceless	plain	p ⟨p⟩	t ⟨t⟩	ts ⟨ts⟩	ʈʳ ⟨tr⟩	k ⟨k⟩	
Plosive and affricate	voiceless	prenasal	ᵐp ⟨mp⟩	ⁿt ⟨nt⟩	ⁿts ⟨nts⟩	ᶯʈʳ ⟨ntr⟩	ᵑk ⟨nk⟩	
Plosive and affricate	voiced	plain	b ⟨b⟩	d ⟨d⟩	dz ⟨j⟩	ɖʳ ⟨dr⟩	ɡ ⟨g⟩	
Plosive and affricate	voiced	prenasal	ᵐb ⟨mb⟩	ⁿd ⟨nd⟩	ⁿdz ⟨nj⟩	ᶯɖʳ ⟨ndr⟩	ᵑɡ ⟨ng⟩	
Fricative	voiceless		f ⟨f⟩		s ⟨s⟩			h ⟨h⟩
Fricative	voiced		v ⟨v⟩		z ⟨z⟩			
Lateral					l ⟨l⟩			
Trill					r ⟨r⟩			

The alveolars /s ts z dz l/ are slightly palatalized. /ts, dz, s, z/ vary between [ts, dz, s, z] and [tʃ, dʒ, ʃ, ʒ], and are especially likely to be the latter when followed by unstressed /i/, thus French malgache [malɡaʃ] 'Malagasy'. The velars /k ɡ ᵑk ᵑɡ h/ are palatalized after /i/ (e.g. alika [alikʲa] 'dog'). /h/ is frequently elided in casual speech.

The reported postalveolar trilled affricates /ʈʳ ᶯʈʳ ɖʳ ᶯɖʳ/ are sometimes simple stops, [ʈ ᶯʈ ɖ ᶯɖ], but they often have a rhotic release, [ʈɽ̊˔ ᶯʈɽ̊˔ ɖɽ˔ ᶯɖɽ˔]. It is not clear if they are actually trilled, or are simply non-sibilant affricates [ʈɻ̊˔ ᶯʈɻ̊˔ ɖɻ˔ ᶯɖɻ˔]. However, in another Austronesian language with a claimed trilled affricate, Fijian, trilling occurs but is rare, and the primary distinguishing feature is that it is postalveolar. The Malagasy sounds are frequently transcribed [ʈʂ ᶯʈʂ ɖʐ ᶯɖʐ], and that is the convention used in this article.

In reduplication, compounding, possessive and verbal constructions, as well as after nasals, fricatives and liquids, 'spirants' become stops, as follows:

Malagasy sandhi
voiced		voiceless	
spirant	stop	spirant	stop
v	b	f	p
l	d		
z	dz	s	ts
r	ɖʳ (ɖʐ)		
		h	k

=== Stress ===
Here, stressed syllables are indicated by grave diacritics ⟨à⟩, although these diacritics are normally not used.

Words are generally accented on the penultimate syllable, unless the word ends in ka, tra and often na, in which case they are stressed on the antepenultimate syllable. Secondary stresses exist in even-numbered syllables from the last stressed syllable, when the word has more than four syllables (fàmantàranàndro [ˌfamˌtarˈnandʐʷ] "watch, clock"). Neither prefixation nor suffixation affect the placement of stress.

In many dialects, unstressed vowels (except /e/) are devoiced, and in some cases almost completely elided; thus fanòrona is pronounced [fə̥ˈnurnə̥].

=== Tonogenesis ===
According to Penelope Howe in 2019, Central Malagasy is undergoing tonogenesis, with syllables containing voiced consonants are "fully devoiced" and acquire a low tone (/ba/ → [b̥à]), while those containing unvoiced consonants acquire a high tone (/pa/ → [pá]). However, this development appears to not occur in posttonic syllables, and she called it "pitch accent" instead.

== Grammar ==
=== Word order ===
Malagasy has a verb–object–subject (VOS) word order:

Mamaky boky ny mpianatra
reads book the student
"The student reads the book"

Nividy ronono ho an'ny zaza ny vehivavy
bought milk for the child the woman
"The woman bought milk for the child"

Within phrases, Malagasy order is typical of head-initial languages: Malagasy has prepositions rather than postpositions (ho an'ny zaza 'for the child'). Determiners precede the noun, while quantifiers, modifying adjective phrases, and relative clauses follow the noun (ny boky 'the book(s)', ny boky mena 'the red book(s)', ny boky rehetra 'all the book(s)', ny boky novakin'ny mpianatra 'the book(s) read by the student(s)').

Somewhat unusually, demonstrative determiners are repeated both before and after the noun: ity boky ity 'this book' (lit. 'this book this').

=== Verbs ===
Verbs have syntactically three productive "voice" forms according to the thematic role they play in the sentence: the basic "agent focus" forms of the majority of Malagasy verbs, the derived "patient focus" forms used in "passive" constructions, and the derived "goal focus" forms used in constructions with focus on instrumentality. Thus, all the following sentences mean "I wash my hands with soap".

- (1) Manasa ny tanako amin'ny savony aho. (lit. 'I am washing my hands with soap.')
- (2) Sasako amin'ny savony ny tanako. (lit. 'My hands are washed with soap by me.')
- (3) Anasako ny tanako ny savony. (lit. 'It is with soap that my hands are washed by me.')

However, focus is determined in each case by the sentence initial verb form and the sentence final (noun) argument: manasa 'wash' and aho 'I' in (1), sasako 'wash' and ny tanako 'my hands' in (2), anasako 'wash' and ny savony 'soap' in (3). There is no equivalent to the English preposition with in (3).

Verbs inflect for past, present, and future tense, where tense is marked by prefixes (e.g. mividy 'buy', nividy 'bought', hividy 'will buy').

=== Nouns and pronouns ===
Malagasy has no grammatical gender, and nouns do not inflect for number. However, pronouns and demonstratives have distinct singular and plural forms (cf. io boky io 'that book', ireto boky ireto 'these books').

There is a complex series of demonstrative pronouns, depending on the speaker's familiarity with the referent.

The following set of pronouns are the pronouns found in Standard Malagasy. Note: the nominative first person singular pronoun is divided between a long and short form; the long form occurs before a verb (focalized or topicalized subjects) and the short form after a verb. The genitive first and second person pronouns are also divided between long and short forms; the long form occurs if the root ends with anything but [na], [ka*] or [tra]; if the stem ends with [na], the long form also occurs but [na] is deleted; and if the stem ends with [ka*] or [tra], the final vowel of the root is deleted and the short form occurs.

			Nominative	Genitive	Accusative
1st person	singular		izaho/aho	-ko/-o	ahy
1st person	plural	exclusive	izahay	-nay/-ay	anay
1st person	plural	inclusive	isika	-ntsika/-tsika	antsika
2nd person	singular		ianao	-nao/-ao	anao
2nd person	plural		ianareo	-nareo/-areo	anareo
3rd person	singular		izy	-ny	antsy
3rd person	plural		izy (ireo)	-ny	azy (ireo)

=== Deixis ===
Malagasy has a complex system of deixis (these, those, here, there, etc.), with seven degrees of distance as well as evidentiality across all seven. The evidential dimension is prototypically visible vs. non-visible referents; however, the non-visible forms may be used for visible referents which are only vaguely identified or have unclear boundaries, whereas the visible forms are used for non-visible referents when these are topical to the conversation.

Malagasy deixis
		proximal		medial		distal		
Adverbs (here, there)	NVIS	atỳ	àto	ào	àtsy	àny	aròa*	arỳ
Adverbs (here, there)	VIS	etỳ	èto	èo	ètsy	èny	eròa	erỳ
Pronouns (this, that) (these, those)	NVIS	izatỳ*	izàto*	izào	izàtsy*	izàny	izaròa*	izarỳ*
Pronouns (this, that) (these, those)	VIS	itỳ	ìto	ìo	ìtsy	ìny	iròa*	irỳ
Pronouns (this, that) (these, those)	VIS.PL	irèto		irèo	irètsy	irèny	ireròa*	irerỳ*

Notes:

- Diacritics in deixis are not mandatory in Malagasy.
- Deixis marked by a * are rarely used.

== Vocabulary ==
Malagasy shares much of its basic vocabulary with the Ma'anyan language, a language from the region of the Barito River in southern Borneo. The Malagasy language also includes some borrowings from Sanskrit, Arabic and Bantu languages (especially the Sabaki branch, from which most notably Swahili derives), and more recently from French and English.

Malagasy Words of Sanskrit Origin
#	Gloss	Sanskrit	Standard Malagasy
1	Debt	दोष (doṣa)	trosa
2	Work	आयास (āyāsa)	asa
3	Palace / Castle	मण्डप (maṇḍapa)	lapa
4	Lover	सखी (sakhī)	sakaiza
5	Arm	संधि (saṃdhi)	sandry
6	History/Story	तन्त्र (tantra)	tantara
7	To check	जागरण (jāgaraṇa)	mizaha (To watch in Northern dialects)
8	Good	आचार (ācāra)	tsara
9	Month (April-May)	वैशाख (Vaiśākha)	sakave
10	To judge	विचार (vicāra)	mitsara
11	Ginger	शृङ्गवेर (śṛṅgaver)	sakaviro
12	Because	साध्य (sādhya)	satria
13	Food	अन्न (anna)	hanina
14	That/Which/Who	यत् (yát)	izay
15	Fence	वलय (Valaya)	vala
16	One hundred thousand (100000)	केति (keṭi)	hetsy
17	Rest	शेषः (śeṣaḥ)	sisa
18	Song	गिरा (girā)	hira
19	Knife	असि (Asi)	antsy
20	To be scattered	परित (Parita)	miparitaka
21	Thunder/lightning	वज्र (Vajra)	varatra
22	Crow	काक (Kāka)	goaika (koaka in Bezanozano)
23	Necklace	रवक (Ravaka)	ravaka
24	Cloud	राहु (Rahu)	rahona
25	Pig	सूकर (Sūkara)	kisoa
26	Today	अद्य (adya)	androany
27	Stove	पात्र (pātra)	fatana
28	Cold	शीत (śīta)	hatsiaka
29	Banana	कदली (kadalī)	kida (Southern dialects)
30	Door	द्वार (dvāra)	varavarana
31	Blood	रक्त (rakta)	ra
32	Slow	मन्द (manda)	miadana
33	Brave	साहस (sāhasa)	saha

Malagasy words of Kikongo Origin
Gloss	Kikingo	Standard Malagasy
Short	Fioti	fohy
Banana	Dikondo	akondro

Malagasy Words of Swahili Origin
#	Gloss	Swahili	Standard Malagasy
1	Ship	Chombo	sambo
2	Paper	Karatasi	taratasy
3	Speech	Habary	kabary
4	Eye	Macho	maso
5	Clothes	Kanzu	akanjo
6	Onion	Kitunguu	tongolo
7	Fable / Story	Ngano	angano
8	Bedbug	Kunguni	kongona
9	Backpack / Bag	Kitapu	kitapo
10	Crocodile	Mamba	mamba
11	Donkey	Punda	ampondra
12	Cat	Paka	saka
13	Cow	Ng'ombe	omby
14	Chicken	Kuku	akoho
15	White man / European	Wazungu	vazaha
16	Witch / Sorcerer	Mchawi	mpamosaby
17	Path / Way / Road	Njia	dia
18	Indian (South Asian)	Karani	karana
19	Guest/Foreigner	Wageni	vahiny
20	Wage/Salary	Gharama	karama
21	Shiny	ng'ara	mangirana
22	Mattress	Godoro	kidoro
23	Disability	Kilema	kilema
24	Shoe	Kiatu	kiraro
25	Floor	Ghorofa	gorodona
26	Centipede	tandu	trambo
27	Cough	Kukohoa	koaka
28	Short	Mfupi	fohy
29	Elbow	Kiwiko	kiho
30	Wasp	Nyigu	fanenitra (fanengitryin Antefasy)
31	Shrimp	Kamba	makamba

Malagasy Words of Semitic Origins
Malagasy Word	Dialect	Etymological Source	Original Language	Gloss
hariva	All dialects	Erev (עֶרֶב)	Hebrew	Evening
tafasiry	Antaifasy	Tafsīr (تفسير)	Arabic	Tale
ariary	Standard Malagasy	Rial (ريال)	Arabic	Money
miarahaba	All dialects	Marḥabā (مرحبا)	Arabic	To greet
malemy	All dialects	Layyin (لَيِّن)	Arabic	Soft
mitarika	All dialects	ṭarīq (طريق)	Arabic	To lead
marary	All dialects	maraḍ (مرض)	Arabic	To be ill/sick/To hurt
midoboky	Southeastern dialects	dubur (دبر)	Arabic	To sit
solika	Standard Malagasy	Saliid	Somali	Oil
sariaka	Merina	sarī'(سريع)	Arabic	Lively
sariaka	Vakinankaratra	sarī'(سريع)	Arabic	Lively
makadiry	Old Merina	Kathīr (كثير)	Arabic	Big/huge/fat
makadiry	Antefasy	Kathīr (كثير)	Arabic	Big/huge/fat
makadiry	Antemoro	Kathīr (كثير)	Arabic	Big/huge/fat
makadiry	Antesaka	Kathīr (كثير)	Arabic	Big/huge/fat
milelaka	Merina	lachak (לָחַךְ)	Hebrew	To lick
milelatry	Antefasy	lachak (לָחַךְ)	Hebrew	To lick
amaray	Vezo	Maḥar (מחר)	Hebrew	Tomorrow
omaray	Antefasy	Maḥar (מחר)	Hebrew	Tomorrow
omaly	All dialects	Etmol (אתמול)	Hebrew	Yesterday
pitsa	Antefasy	Tsar (צר)	Hebrew	Narrow
pitsa	Antemoro	Tsar (צר)	Hebrew	Narrow
pitsa	Antesaka	Tsar (צר)	Hebrew	Narrow
tsihy	Standard Malagasy	ḥaṣīr (حصير)	Arabic	Mat
olitra	All dialects	Tolaʿat (תולעת)	Hebrew	Worm
parasy	All dialects	Parʿosh (פרעוש)	Hebrew	Flea
rivotra	All dialects	rīḥ (رِيح)	Arabic	Wind
zavatra	All dialects	Davar (דבר)	Hebrew	Thing/object
mihaza	All dialects	Tsuwd (צוּד)	Hebrew	To hunt/To fish
sola	All dialects	aṣlaʿ (ﺃَﺻﻠَﻊ)	Arabic	Bald
havana	Northern/Central-Eastern dialects	Ḥaver (חבר)	Hebrew	Relatives/loved ones
fandrika	All dialects	Faḵḵ (فَخّ)	Arabic	Trap
aina	All dialects	Ḥayāh (حَيَاة)	Arabic	Life
Vata na	All dialects	Badan (بَدَن)	Arabic	Body
onjana	All dialects	Mawja (مَوْجَة)	Arabic	Wave

Malagasy Words of Indo-European Origins
Malagasy Word	Dialect	Etymological Source	Original Language	Gloss
amesa	Antaifasy	Mes	Dutch	Knife
meso	Antakarana	Mes	Dutch	Knife
mesa	Tanosy	Mes	Dutch	Knife
amely	Antaifasy	Morelle noire	French	Black nightshade
mely	Bara	Morelle noire	French	Black nightshade
'mlajoly	Bara	La geôle	French	Jail
kazaha	Antaifasy	Cassava	English	Cassava
kazaha	Antemoro	Cassava	English	Cassava
kazaha	Betsileo	Cassava	English	Cassava
sarisoky	Antaifasy	Soursop	English	Soursop
sarisoky	Antemoro	Soursop	English	Soursop
kôpy	Antaifasy	Cup	English	Cup
tamatesy	Vezo	Tomatoes	English	Tomatoes
tamatesy	Antaifasy	Tomatoes	English	Tomatoes
zarikô	Northern Betsimisaraka	Haricot	French	Bean
zarikô	Antakarana	Haricot	French	Bean
lekôly	Antakarana	École	French	School
lekôly	Northern Betsimisaraka	École	French	School
lekôly	Northern Sakalava	École	French	School
lekôly	Tsimihety	École	French	School
lakilasy	Antemoro	La classe	French	School
lakilasy	Antaifasy	La classe	French	School
lakilasy	Antesaka	La classe	French	School
sekoly	Betsileo	School	English	School
sekoly	Merina	School	English	School
sekoly	Vakinankaratra	School	English	School
Kabeso	Southern Sakalava	Cabeça	Portuguese	Head
drala	Vezo	Dollar	English	Money
drala	Masikoro	Dollar	English	Money
basy	All dialects	Busse	Dutch	Gun
mpingaratse	Tandroy	Espingarda	Portuguese	Gun
bazar	Antefasy	bāzār (بازار)	Persian	Market
bazar	Antemoro	bāzār (بازار)	Persian	Market
bazar	Antesaka	bāzār (بازار)	Persian	Market
batata	Northern Sakalava	Batata-doce	Portuguese	Sweet potato
tahotra/tahotry	Northern/Central-Eastern dialects	Tars (ترس)	Persian	Fear
tahotsa /tahotsy/tahotse	Betsileo/Southern dialects	Tars (ترس)	Persian	Fear

Malagasy contains many words that derive from Malay which have completely different original definitions unlike those of its close relative Ma'anyan:

Meaning	Ma'anyan	Malagasy	Malay etymon	
Meaning	Ma'anyan	Word	direct correspondence based on sound change	actual meaning
back	wading	lamosina	lembusir, lambung sisir	back of a slaughtered animal i.e. sirloin (lit. 'flank side')
shoulder	papale	soroka	suduk	spade
finger	kingking	rantsana	rancang	pole, stake
foot	pe'e	tomboka	tumbuk	to pound (of earth, rice)
vulva		tingy	tinggi	high

== Lexicography ==
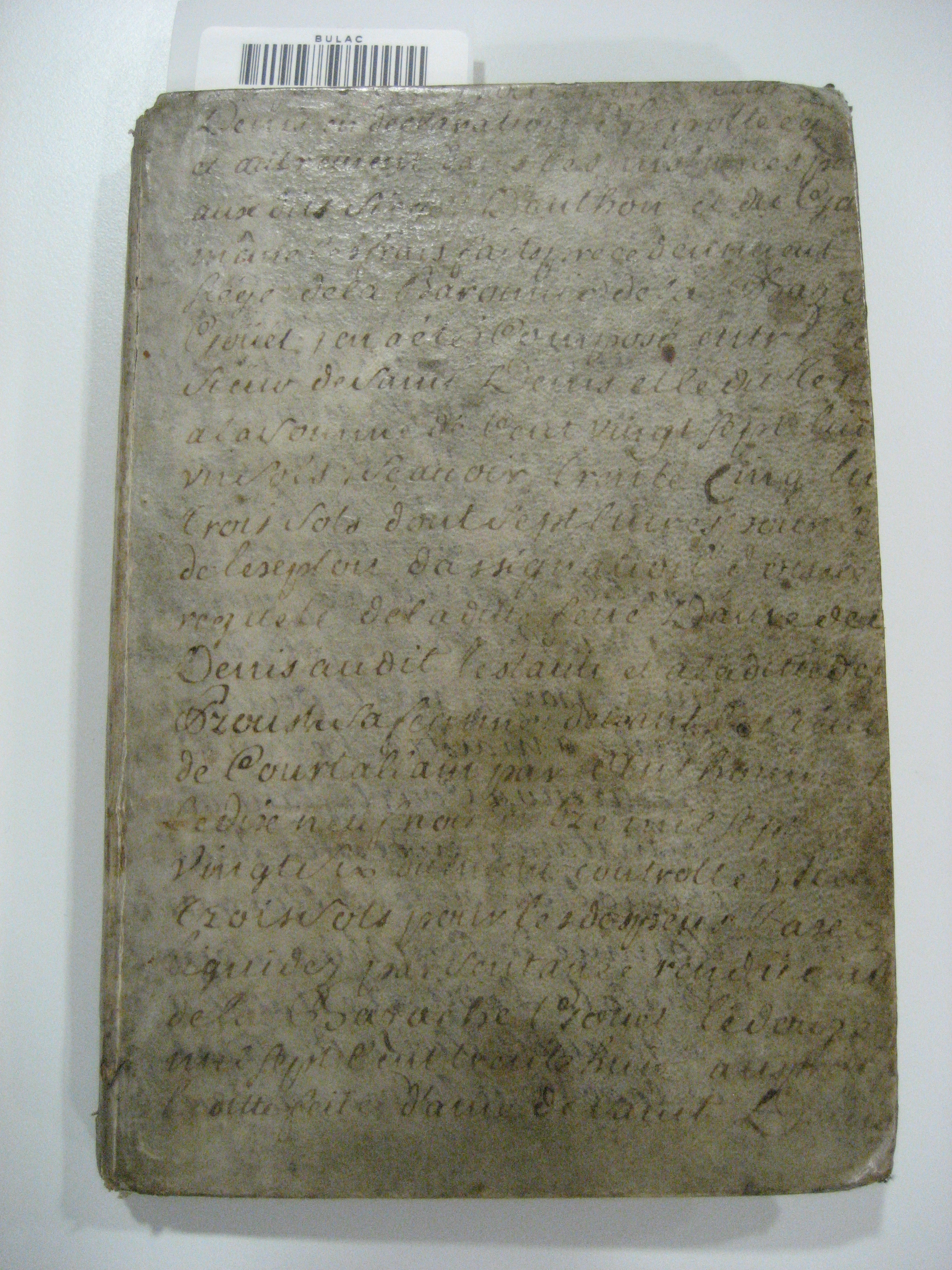
Malagasy lexicon (1773) (Collection BULAC Paris)

The first dictionary of the language is Étienne de Flacourt's Dictionnaire de la langue de Madagascar published in 1658 though earlier glossaries written in Arabico-Malagasy script exist. A later Vocabulaire Anglais-Malagasy was published in 1729. An 892-page Malagasy–English dictionary was published by James Richardson of the London Missionary Society in 1885, available as a reprint; however, this dictionary includes archaic terminology and definitions. Whereas later works have been of lesser size, several have been updated to reflect the evolution and progress of the language, including a more modern, bilingual frequency dictionary based on a corpus of over 5 million Malagasy words.

- Winterton, M. et al.: Malagasy–English, English–Malagasy Dictionary / Diksionera Malagasy–Anglisy, Anglisy–Malagasy. Raleigh, North Carolina. USA: Lulu Press 2011, 548 p.
- Richardson: A New Malagasy–English Dictionary. Farnborough, England: Gregg Press 1967, 892 p. ISBN 0-576-11607-6 (Original edition, Antananarivo: The London Missionary Society, 1885).
- Diksionera Malagasy–Englisy. Antananarivo: Trano Printy Loterana 1973, 103 p.
- An Elementary English–Malagasy Dictionary. Antananarivo: Trano Printy Loterana 1969, 118 p.
- English–Malagasy Phrase Book. Antananarivo: Editions Madprint 1973, 199 p. (Les Guides de Poche de Madagasikara.)
- Paginton, K: English–Malagasy Vocabulary. Antananarivo: Trano Printy Loterana 1970, 192 p.
- Bergenholtz, H. et al.: Rakibolana Malagasy–Alemana. Antananarivo: Leximal/Moers: aragon. 1991.
- Bergenholtz, H. et al.: Rakibolana Alemana–Malagasy. Antananarivo: Tsipika/Moers: aragon. 1994.
- Rakibolana Malagasy. Fianarantsoa: Régis RAJEMISOA – RAOLISON 1995, 1061 p.

== Sample text ==
Article 1 of the Universal Declaration of Human Rights in Malagasy:

Teraka afaka sy mitovy zo sy fahamendrehana ny olombelona rehetra. Samy manan-tsaina sy fieritreretana ka tokony hifampitondra am- pirahalahiana.

Article 1 of the Universal Declaration of Human Rights in English:

All human beings are born free and equal in dignity and rights. They are endowed with reason and conscience and should act towards one another in a spirit of brotherhood.

== See also ==
- Jean-Joseph Rabearivelo
- Languages of Madagascar

== Sources ==
- Biddulph, Joseph (1997). An Introduction to Malagasy. Pontypridd, Cymru. ISBN 978-1-897999-15-8.
- Houlder, John Alden, Ohabolana, ou proverbes malgaches. Imprimerie Luthérienne, Tananarive 1960.
- Hurles, Matthew E.; et al. (2005). "The Dual Origin of the Malagasy in Island Southeast Asia and East Africa: Evidence from Maternal and Paternal Lineages". American Journal of Human Genetics. 76 (5): 894–901. Bibcode:2005AmJHG..76..894H. doi:10.1086/430051. PMC 1199379. PMID 15793703.
- Ricaut et al. (2009) "A new deep branch of eurasian mtDNA macrohaplogroup M reveals additional complexity regarding the settlement of Madagascar", BMC Genomics.
