= Antambahoaka =

Ethnic group in Madagascar

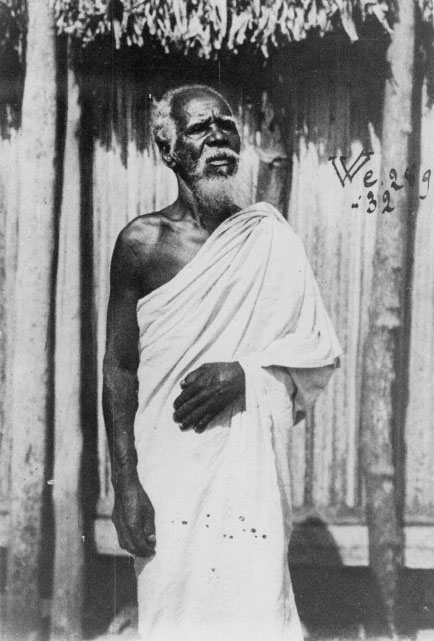
- Elder of an Antambahoaka village, 1908

Total population
- c. 50,000

Regions with significant populations
- Madagascar

Languages
- Antambahoaka

Related ethnic groups
- Other Malagasy groups, Austronesian peoples, Bantu peoples

The Antambahoaka are the least numerous ethnic group in Madagascar, numbering around 50,000 in 2013. They inhabit a small region along the southeastern coast of Madagascar near Mananjary and share their origins with the partially Arab Antaimoro people, from whom the group split in the 15th century under a leader named Ravalarivo. Very little is known about the history of this group after its founding. The Antambahoaka speak a dialect of the Malagasy language, which is a branch of the Malayo-Polynesian language group derived from the Barito languages, spoken in southern Borneo.

The Antambahoaka are widely known for their Sambatra festival, a ritual group circumcision ceremony that occurs every seven years. This festival has been the focus of two short films released in 2008 and 2010. Their society is highly homogenous with little external migration and a strong sense of unified identity. Patriarchy, ancestor veneration and adherence to ancestral taboos (fady) are core elements of their social structure. There is a long-standing taboo against raising twins that historically led them to be killed immediately after birth or left to die of exposure in the forest. Human rights groups and the Malagasy government are working to provide support for twins and their parents in the effort to put an end to this tradition.

== Ethnic identity ==
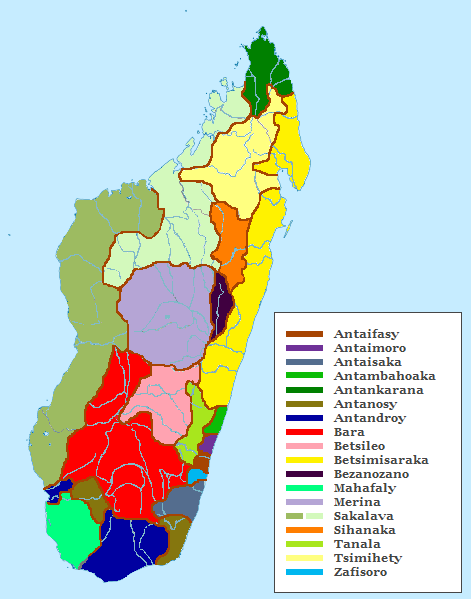
Distribution of Malagasy ethnic groups

The Antambahoaka are the least numerous ethnic group of Madagascar, numbering around 50,000 people in 2013. Like the Antaimoro from which they are derived, the Antambahoaka, while mostly of Black African ancestry, they also have some Arab ancestry and bear some Arab physical features. The largest Antambahoaka town, Mananjary, is located on the southeastern coast.

== History ==
The Antambahoaka share their origins with the Antaimoro people, who believe they are the descendants of an Arab named Raminia who migrated from Mecca to Madagascar between the 10th and 12th centuries. Oral tradition offers two explanations for Raminia's emigration. It is commonly said that he left to escape an increasingly rigid application of Islamic law; others attribute the departure to his search for fertile land to cultivate. The Antambahoaka split off from the Antaimoro in the fifteenth century when an Antaimoro named Ravalarivo established a new community called Masindrano that later grew to become the town of Mananjary; the neighborhood of Masindrano exists to the present day. Among some Antambahoaka it is said that Ravalarivo came to be called Ratiambahoaka (beloved by his people), and the community he founded derived its name from a deformation of this title - Antambahoaka. Very little is known about their history from the 16th to the 18th centuries.

== Society ==
The Antambahoaka live in a highly homogeneous community with relatively few immigrants and lower rates of emigration than neighboring peoples. They have a strong sense of unified identity around descent from their common ancestor, Raminia. There are numerous local kings who exert authority over one or more villages. At an annual festival called hosin'ny mpanjaka, villagers gather to prepare the local king's paddy field for planting rice. Antambahoaka society is strongly patrilineal and patriarchal.

=== Family affiliation ===
The eldest male is typically the head of a household. The head of an extended family of 8-10 households is called a lohatrano (head of the house), and he in turn submits to the authority of the local mpanjaka (king) who governs approximately 8-10 lohatrano. In addition, Amtambahoaka society recognizes soman-drazana, a "joking relationship" - a connection between two clans reflected in the familiarity of their tone of speech in addressing each other - that is viewed as equivalent to a blood relationship.

Grandparents have an important role in the family. For instance, a child's first haircut is performed by the grandparents. In some Antambahoaka communities, during the Sambatra ceremony the grandparents will eat the foreskin of their newly circumcised grandchild.

=== Class affiliation ===
Traditional Antambahoaka society was divided into the classes of nobles (andriana), commoners and slaves. The two Antambahoaka noble sub-groups were the Onjatsy and Tsimaito, who were the keepers of scientific knowledge, magic and charm-making and mastered the use of sorabe, the local language transcribed using Arabic script.

=== Religious affiliation ===
The Antambahoaka, like the majority of Malagasy people, venerate their ancestors through a variety of rituals and rites; the most significant of these among the Antambahoaka remains the sambatra celebration. They believe that a community member who dies becomes an ancestor capable of watching over their living descendants and intervening for good or ill depending on whether the living show them proper respect and practice the rites and fady they had established. It is believed that an ancestor grows stronger the more time has passed since their death. Catholicism was introduced by French missionaries during the French colonial period (1896-1960) but to limited effect. Certain Islamic practices have been incorporated into the local culture. Village chiefs may not eat pork, and animals must be fully bled when butchered for eating.

== Culture ==
Clothing called tafitsihy was traditionally made of sedges (harefo) or beaten bark woven into mats that were then stitched together. Women traditionally wore harefo reed mats stitched to form a tube dress that was knotted at one shoulder or belted at the waist. Mahampy reeds were also woven to form a bandeau top that adolescent and adult women wore under their dress. For men, a beaten bark loincloth was worn under a woven sedge tunic or jacket. During special occasions the mpanjaka (kings) often wear traditional, Islamic-inspired dress consisting of a red fez and a loose garment with wide red and black stripes.

The homes of local mpanjaka, called tranobe (big houses), are used as community meeting space as well as a temple for the worship of ancestors. These houses are unusually large by Malagasy standards, built in a rectangular form with no veranda, and are raised on low stilts and have a gabled roof covered in ravinala leaves. The floor is also typically made of ravenala, and the walls are constructed of braided falafa leaves. There are ten such tranobe in Mananjary and twelve in the historic village of Ambohitsara, but most Antambaohoaka villages have three or four.

The Antambahoaka use amulets for protection. Incest between brother and sister used to be somewhat common among the Antambahoaka, who considered these relations to bring good fortune.

=== Sambatra ===
For centuries the Antambahoaka have celebrated the Sambatra, which takes place on the "Friday year" every seven years. The celebration culminates in the circumcision of all boys born in the previous seven years, a rite of passage that transitions the Antambahoaka boy to an adult male and Zafiraminia (son of Raminia). From this moment on, he will be integrated into the paternal clan and initiated into the life of the true Antambahoaka man. It is not only a major moment in the boys' lives but also for the entire community. For the entire month of Sambatra, the Antambahoaka commemorate their origins and Raminia's circumcision of his own son Ndohanina, who passed the practice down to his people. During the month of Sambatra there are war reenactments between "armies" led by the Antambahoaka general for each clan, composed of the boys' fathers and their maternal uncles dressed as soldiers. Sometimes the reenactments contain heightened violence to settle old scores. On one of the Fridays the military units undertake a long march toward the mouth of the Mananjary river to recall Raminia’s exodus. Two short films have been produced about the Sambatra among the Antambahoaka. The first, a 52 minute film entitled "Sambatra", was directed by Ronan Leroy and Solo Randrasana and was released in 2008. The second was a 24 minute film directed by Quitterie Bienvenu and released in 2010 under the title "Les Enfants de Raminia" (The Children of Raminia).

=== Fady ===
A strong fady among the Antambahoaka, termed the fady kamamba, prohibits the raising of twins, particularly in the area around Mananjary. Economic and social pressures have led families in neighboring communities to also follow this practice. It is believed that twins will bring bad luck to the family that raises them and to the broader community. Consequently, if a woman gives birth to twins she is expected to abandon them in the wilderness to die of exposure; historically the children were strangled immediately after birth by the village sorcerer. An increasing number of families are unwilling to adhere to this taboo and have been ostracised by the community, typically being forced to leave their home village to live at the outskirts of another. This practice is regularly denounced by national and international bodies as contradictory to the United Nations' 1989 Convention on the Rights of the Child, to which Madagascar is a signatory, but the custom is deeply rooted. Twins are forbidden from participating in the Sambatra festivities, are not allowed to join the annual ritual of preparing the king's paddy fields for planting, and are excluded both from the family tomb and from being considered a familial ancestor after their death. Local and international human rights organizations are partnering with the Malagasy government to bring an end to this practice.

=== Funeral rites ===
The Antambahoaka bury their dead in a kibory, a house in the forest far from the village.

=== Dance and music ===
The antsa, a traditional polyharmonic singing style performed by women, is popular among the Antambahoaka. At major festivals, music is played on a conch shell (antsiva) that has been drilled with finger holes. Music is typically accompanied by the hazolahy, a large, deep-toned drum.

== Language ==
The Antambahoaka speak Antambahoaka, a Malagasy dialect close Southern Betsimisaraka and Southeastern dialects. The local dialect was originally written using sorabe, the Arabic alphabet adapted to transcribe the Malagasy language. Today, only a small number of specially educated Antambahoaka have learned to read and write using the sorabe script. In addition, a "secret language" using a blend of Arabic, Malagasy and Creole words was historically spoken among ombiasy to communicate confidential knowledge and rites.

== Economy ==
The principal economic activity of the Antambahoaka is fishing, both oceanic and in freshwater inland rivers and lakes. The majority are also subsistence farmers, and some engage in the raising of cash crops like coffee.

== Bibliography ==
- Adelaar, Alexander; Himmelmann, Nikolaus (2013). The Austronesian Languages of Asia and Madagascar. New York: Routledge. ISBN 9781136755095.
- Bradt, Hilary; Austin, Daniel (2007). Madagascar (9th ed.). Guilford, CT: The Globe Pequot Press Inc. ISBN 978-1-84162-197-5.
- Condra, Jill (2013). Encyclopedia of National Dress: Traditional Clothing Around the World. Los Angeles: ABC Clio. ISBN 978-0-313-37637-5.
- Diagram Group (2013). Encyclopedia of African Peoples. San Francisco, CA: Routledge. ISBN 9781135963415.
- Ferrand, Gabriel (1902). Les musulmans a Madagascar et aux Comores: Troisieme partie - Antankarana, sakalava, migrations arabes (in French). Paris: Ernest Leroux.
- Gennep, A.V. (1904). Tabou Et Totémisme à Madagascar (in French). Paris: Ernest Leroux. ISBN 978-5-87839-721-6.
- Ogot, Bethwell A. (1992). Africa from the Sixteenth to the Eighteenth Century. Paris: UNESCO. ISBN 9789231017117.
- Raison-Jourde, Françoise; Randrianja, Solofo (2002). La nation malgache au défi de l'ethnicité. Paris: Karthala Editions. ISBN 9782845863040.
