= Tanala dialect =

Austronesian language of Madagascar

Tanala
- Native to: Madagascar
- Ethnicity: Tanala people
- Native speakers: 1,555,000
- Language family: Austronesian: Malayo-Polynesian; Western Indonesian; Barito; East Barito; Central-Eastern Malagasic; Plateau Malagasy; Tanala
- Writing system: Latin script (Malagasy alphabet)

Language codes
- ISO 639-3: plt
- Glottolog: mala1537
- Linguasphere: 31-LDA-aha
- Tanala dialect – Ikongo Tanala women in Ikongo describe the impact of a cyclone in an interview.

Tanala is a dialect of Malagasy spoken by Tanala people in Madagascar.

== Classification ==
Tanala or Antagnala language belongs to the Austronesian language family and one of dialects of the subgroup Plateaux Malagasy.

== Characteristics ==
The Tañala dialect of the South (Ikongo), in its generality, presents some differences (in terms of pronunciation and vocabulary) with the Tañala dialect of the North (Ifanadiana and Ambohimanga du Sud).

== Geographic distribution ==
The Tanala dialect is widely spoken in the former region of Vatovavy-Fitovinany. Following the administrative split, it is primarily spoken in the Ifanadiana District of the current Vatovavy region and in the Ikongo District of the current Fitovinany region. It is the primary dialect spoken in the cities of Ambohimanga Sud, Ifanadiana, Ikongo, and Ranomafana.

== Vocabulary ==
Tanala Vocabulary
#	Gloss	Standard Malagasy	Tanala
Pronouns
1	Them	Zareo / Ireo	Zareo
2	Us	Isika	Antsena
3	Both	Samy	Samby
4	All	Avy / Rehetra	Aby / Maro be
5	Even	Na dia	Ndreka
People & Family
6	Family	Fianakaviana	Fianakavena
7	Children	Zanaka	Anaka
8	Elderly	Antitra	Mavozo
Place & Space
9	Inside	Anaty	Agnaty
10	Outside	Ivelany	Embelagny
Nature
11	River	Renirano	Ranomamy
12	Sea	Ranomasina	Ranomasina
13	Rain	Orana	Erika
14	Cloud	Rahona	Rahogna
15	Night	Alina	Aligna
Description & Action
16	Little	Kely	Bitaka
17	To tell	Tenenina	Zakaina
