= Mikea dialect =

Austronesian language of Madagascar

Mikea
- Ethnicity: Mikea
- Language family: Austronesian: Malayo-Polynesian; Western Indonesian; Barito; East Barito; Southern Malagasic; Mikea
- Writing system: Latin script (Malagasy alphabet)

Language codes
- ISO 639-3: –
- Glottolog: mike1243
- Mikea dialect sample A Mikea speaker calling for spirit protection and blessing.

Mikea is a Southern Malagasy dialect spoken by the Mikea people in the region of Atsimo-Andrefana. It is closely related to the dialects spoken by the Vezo and Masikoro communities.

== Vocabulary ==
Mikea Vocabulary with Standard Malagasy comparison
#	Gloss	Standard Malagasy	Mikea
1	Us	Izahay	Rahay
2	Again	Indray	Ndreky
3	To watch	—	Manenty
4	Good	Tsara / Soa	Soa
5	If	Raha	Laha
6	They / Them	Zareo	Rozy
7	Bad	Ratsy	Raty
8	You (singular)	Anao	Iha
9	All	Avy	Iaby
10	Guest	Vahiny	Vahiny
11	Above	Ambony	Agnabo
