= Mahafaly dialect =

Austronesian language dialect of Madagascar

Mahafaly
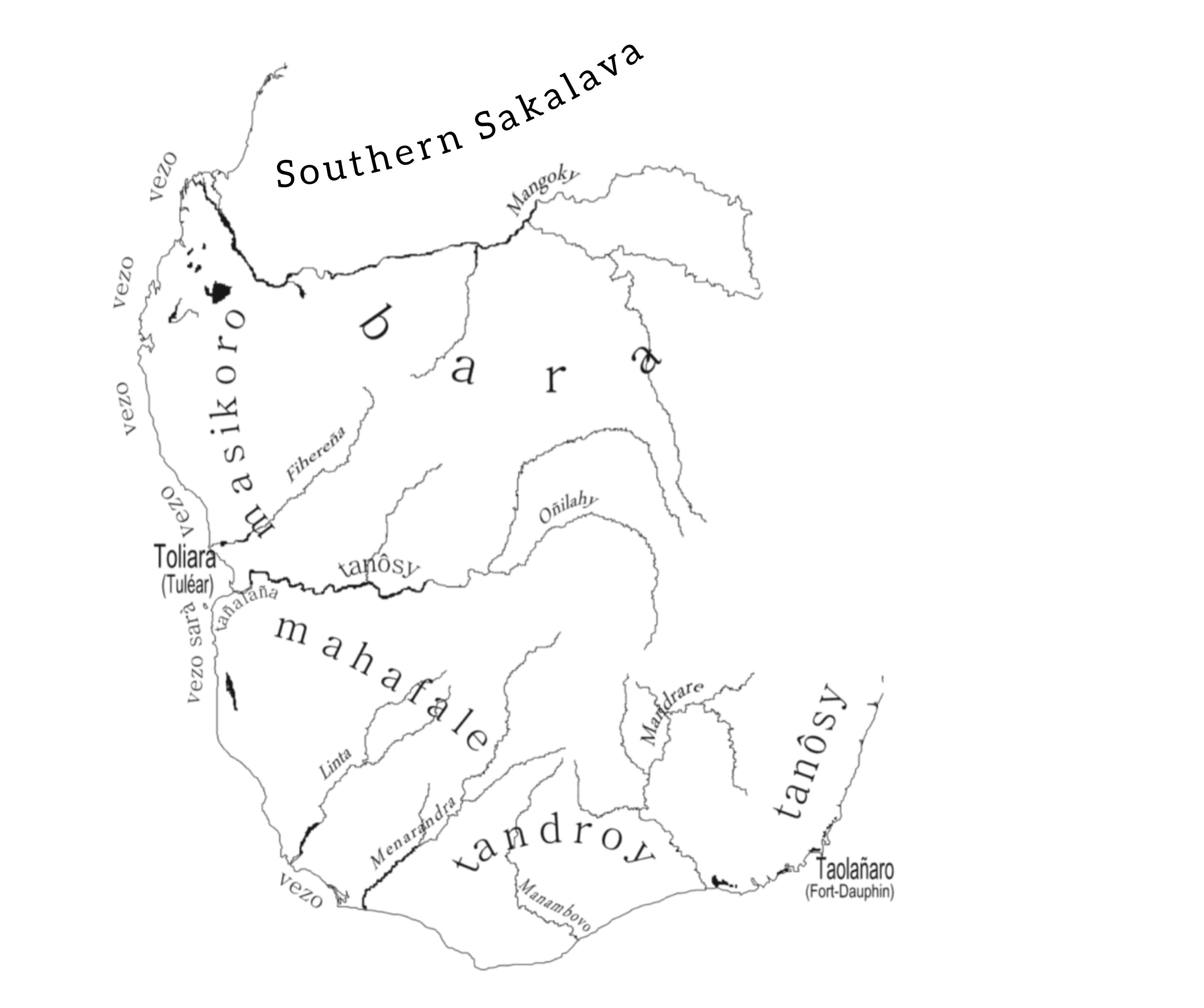
- Native to: Madagascar
- Region: Atsimo-Andrefana region, southwest Madagascar
- Ethnicity: Mahafaly people
- Native speakers: 472,000
- Language family: Austronesian: Malayo-Polynesian; Barito languages; Malagasy; Southern Malagasic; Mahafaly
- Writing system: Latin script (Malagasy alphabet)

Language codes
- ISO 639-3: tdx
- Glottolog: maha1309
- Linguasphere: 31-LDA-cb
- Mahafaly dialect sample Two Mahafaly men from Betioky Atsimo complaining about bandit attacks and saying that they will retaliate and use mob justice if the state does not intervene.

Mahafaly is a dialect of the Malagasy language spoken by the Mahafaly people in the Atsimo-Andrefana region of southwestern Madagascar.

== Classification ==
Mahafaly belongs to the Austronesian languages family under the Malayo-Polynesian languages branch, within the Barito languages group. It is classified as a Southern Malagasic dialect alongside Southern Sakalava,Tandroy, Vezo, Masikoro and Karimbola.

== Geographic distribution ==
Mahafaly is spoken by approximately 472,000 people in the arid southwest of Madagascar, mainly in the Atsimo-Andrefana region.
