= Antakarana dialect =

Austronesian language of Madagascar

Antakarana
- Native to: Madagascar
- Ethnicity: Antakarana people
- Native speakers: 221,000
- Language family: Austronesian: Malayo-Polynesian; Western Indonesian; Barito; East Barito; Northern Malagasic; Antakarana
- Writing system: Latin script (Malagasy alphabet)

Language codes
- ISO 639-3: xmv
- Glottolog: anta1255
- Linguasphere: 31-LDA-fa
- Antakarana language sample A woman reading gospel in the Antakarana dialect.

Antakarana is a northern dialect of Malagasy spoken by Antakarana people in the province of Antsiranana.

== Classification ==
Antakarana is classified as a northern dialect of the Malagasy language, which is a member of the Austronesian language family. It shares close linguistic affinities with other northern Malagasy dialects, including Northern Sakalava, Bushi, Northern Betsimisaraka, and Tsimihety.

== Geographic distribution ==
The Antakarana dialect is predominantly spoken in the Diana Region of northern Madagascar. It is also used to a lesser extent in parts of the Sava Region, particularly in the Vohemar District, as well as in portions of the Sofia Region, notably in some areas of the Analalava District and the Bealanana District.

== Characteristics ==
The extended French colonial presence in the former Antsiranana Province has influenced the Antakarana dialect, leading to the incorporation of numerous French loanwords. As a result, the dialect exhibits a notable blend of indigenous Malagasy linguistic features and French lexical elements.

Few French Loanwords Daily Used in Antakarana
#	Gloss	French	Antakarana
1	Woman	Femme	Famo
2	So / Therefore	Donc	Dônko
3	What time is it?	Quelle heure est-il ?	Kelera ma zioty
4	Money	Argent	Lamone
5	Thank you	Merci	Mersy boko
6	Hotel	Hôtel	Lotely

== Vocabulary ==
Antakarana Vocabulary Compared with Standard Malagasy
#	Gloss	Malagasy standard	Antakarana
Time
1	Day	Andro	Andra
2	Today	Androany	Niany
3	Week	Herin’andro	Herigniandra
4	Month	Volana	Vôlagna / Fanjava
5	Year	Taona	Taogno
6	Always	Foana	Fô
7	Hour	Ora	Lera
8	Minute	Minitra	Minity
9	Second	Segondra	Segondy
Quantifiers & Conjunctions
10	All	Avy	Jiaby
11	Only	Ihany / Fotsiny	Fô / Fôtiny
12	And	Sy	Ndreky
Pronouns & People
13	That	Izany	Zegny
14	Who	Iza	Azôvy
15	They	Zareo / Ireo	Irô
16	We / Us	Zahay	Zahe / Zehy
17	You	Anao	Anô
18	Woman	Vehivavy	Famo
Location & Direction
19	Here	Ato / Aty	Atô / Aty
20	From	Avy	Baka
21	Hotel	Lotely	Lotely
Objects / Things
22	Money	Vola	Lamone
Verbs
23	To give	Manome	Magnamia
24	To let	Avela	Ambila
25	To put	Mametraka	Magnampetrika
Movement / Travel Verbs
26	Go by motorcycle	Mandeha moto izy	Mandeha moto izy
27	Go by bicycle	Mandeha bisikilety izy	Mandeha bisikilety izy
28	Go on foot	Mandeha aingana	Izy mandeha vity
29	Go by boat	Mandeha sambo izy	Izy mandeha sambo
30	Swim	Milomano izy	Izy milomogno
Greetings & Daily Expressions
31	Hello / Good morning	Mbalatsara	Mbalatsara
32	What’s new?	Manao ahoana, vaovao	Kabaro / Ino maresaka
33	Nothing special	Tsisy vaoavao	Tsisy kabaro / Tsisy maresaka
34	How are you?	Manao ahoana	Akory ma nañinao?
35	And you?	Ary anao?	Anao ke?
36	I am leaving	Andeha zaho	Andeha zaho
37	See you tomorrow	Rampitso indray	Amaray koa
38	Goodbye	Veloma	Samby tsara ê! / Viloma!
39	See you next time	Amy manaraka indray	Amy mañaraka koa
40	See you later	Teteky io	Teteky io
41	Yes	Ia	Ia
42	No	Hehe	Hehe
43	Good night	Tafandriamandry	Samy mandry mionjoño
Travel / Flight Phrases
44	I would like to book a seat	Izaho tia hanao famandriatoerana	Zaho seky agnano rezervation amy dia mandeha a…
45	I would like to confirm my reservation	Tiako ny hanamarina ny famandrihana nataoko	Zaho seky agnano confirmation reservation naka
46	I would like to cancel my reservation	Tiako ny hanafoana ny famandrihana nataoko	Zaho seky agnafoagna rezervationaka
47	Are there still two free seats?	Mbola misy seza roa malalaka ve?	Mbala misy pilasy libra aroe e?
48	When will we land?	Rahoviana isika no hidina?	Ombiagna atsika mibedagna?
49	When will we be there?	Rahoviana isika no ho tonga any?	Ombiagna atsika avy agny?
50	Is this your suitcase?	Valizinao ve io?	Valizinao ma io?
51	Is this your bag?	Sakinao ve io?	Sakanao ma io?
52	How many pieces of luggage can I take?	Firy ny bagazy azoko entina?	Firy bagazy manjary indesiko?
53	What, only twenty kilos?	20 kilo ihany ve?	20 kilo fo?
Directions & Transportation
54	Is it dangerous here?	Mampampahoatra ve eto?	Mampavozo ma eto?
55	Is it dangerous at night?	Mampatahotra ve ny mitsangatsangana aminy aligny?	Mampavozo ma mitsangatsangana aminy aligny?
56	We took the wrong way	Very làlana isika izany	Atsika very làlagna
57	We need to turn back	Mila miverina isika	Atsika mila mimpody
58	Where can we park?	Aiza isika no mametraka fiara?	Aia ma atsika hidòko?
59	Is there parking here?	Misy parking ve eto?	Misy parking ma eto?
60	How long can we park here?	Ao anatiny ora firy no afaka mijanona eto?	Agnatiny lera firy ma mety mijanogno eto?
61	Please call a taxi	Anakano Taxi izaho azafady?	Sakagna taxi kony za azafady?
62	How much to the airport?	Ohatrinona ny mankany amin'ny seranam-piaramanidina?	Ohatrino ma mandeha firaka amy laeroport?
63	Straight ahead, please	Mahitsy foana azafady!	Mahitsy fo kony azafady!
64	Turn right, please	Mivily miankavia azafady	Mivily a droite kony
65	I am in a hurry	Maika izaho io	Zaho io meky
66	I have time	Tsy maika izaho	Zaho tsy meky
67	Go slower, please	Moramora azafady	Moramora kony azafady
68	Stop here, please	Mijanona eto azafady	Mijanogna eto kony
69	I don’t have change	Tsisy vola izaho	Zaho tsisy lamone
70	That’s fine, keep the change	Tazomy ny famerim-bola azafady	Pare, tana agny vola mimpody
71	Take me to this address	Ento amin'ity adress ity izaho azafady	Indosa amy tany ty kony zaho
72	Take me to this hotel	Ento amin'ity trano fandrasam-bahiny ity izaho	Indosa alotely ty kony zaho
73	Take me to the beach	Ento any amoron-dranomasina	Indosa a ramena kony
74	Excuse me!	Azafady!	Azafady kony!
75	Could you help me?	Afaka manampy ahy ve ianao azafady?	Mba tahia kony zaho azafady?
