= Marofotsy =

Regions with significant populations
- Madagascar

Languages
- Marofotsy

Religion
- Traditional beliefs Christianity

The Marofotsy are a Malagasy tribe located in the district of Tsaratanana.

== Etymology ==
The name Marofotsy comes from a Sihanaka clan originally called Maromainty who migrated from Antsihanaka. They renamed themselves Marofotsy after finding a herd named Maromainty, and their first village, Ambohitrimarofotsy, gave its name to the province. They represent the main population of the district.

== Location ==
The Marofotsy province lies northwest of the Imerina in the district of Tsaratanana.

== Recognition ==
The Marofotsy like the Masikoro, Mikea and the Sahafatra aren't included in the 18 officially recognized tribes of Madagascar despite being a full-fledged ethnic group.

== History ==
Before the 17th century, the Marofotsy region was sparsely populated. Over time, it attracted refugees and migrants from neighboring regions. From Boina, some fled after Andriamandisoarivo defeated Queen Rasoalo of the Mananadabo people and settled in Marofotsy. From Imerina, some Vazimba and later Merina moved to Marofotsy to escape harsh justice, forced labor, and military service. From Antsihanaka, following the subjugation of the Sihanaka by Andrianampoinimerina, some migrated west to Marofotsy, led by Randrianombelaza, son of the Sihanaka chief Ratohana.

During the Menalamba rebellion, the Marofotsy were feared raiders in the northern highlands. In the Antsihanaka region, entire villages were abandoned as people fled raids attributed to the Marofotsy, the Sakalava, and other bandits. Missionaries described scenes of panic: Sihanaka families hid in the reeds around Lake Alaotra, and churches such as that of Amparafaravola were burned. The rebellion's chaos destroyed Christian missions, and many converts returned to traditional religion. By the end of 1895, raiders had blocked all roads to Antananarivo.

== See also ==
- Manendy
