= Tandroy dialect =

Austronesian language dialect of Madagascar

Tandroy
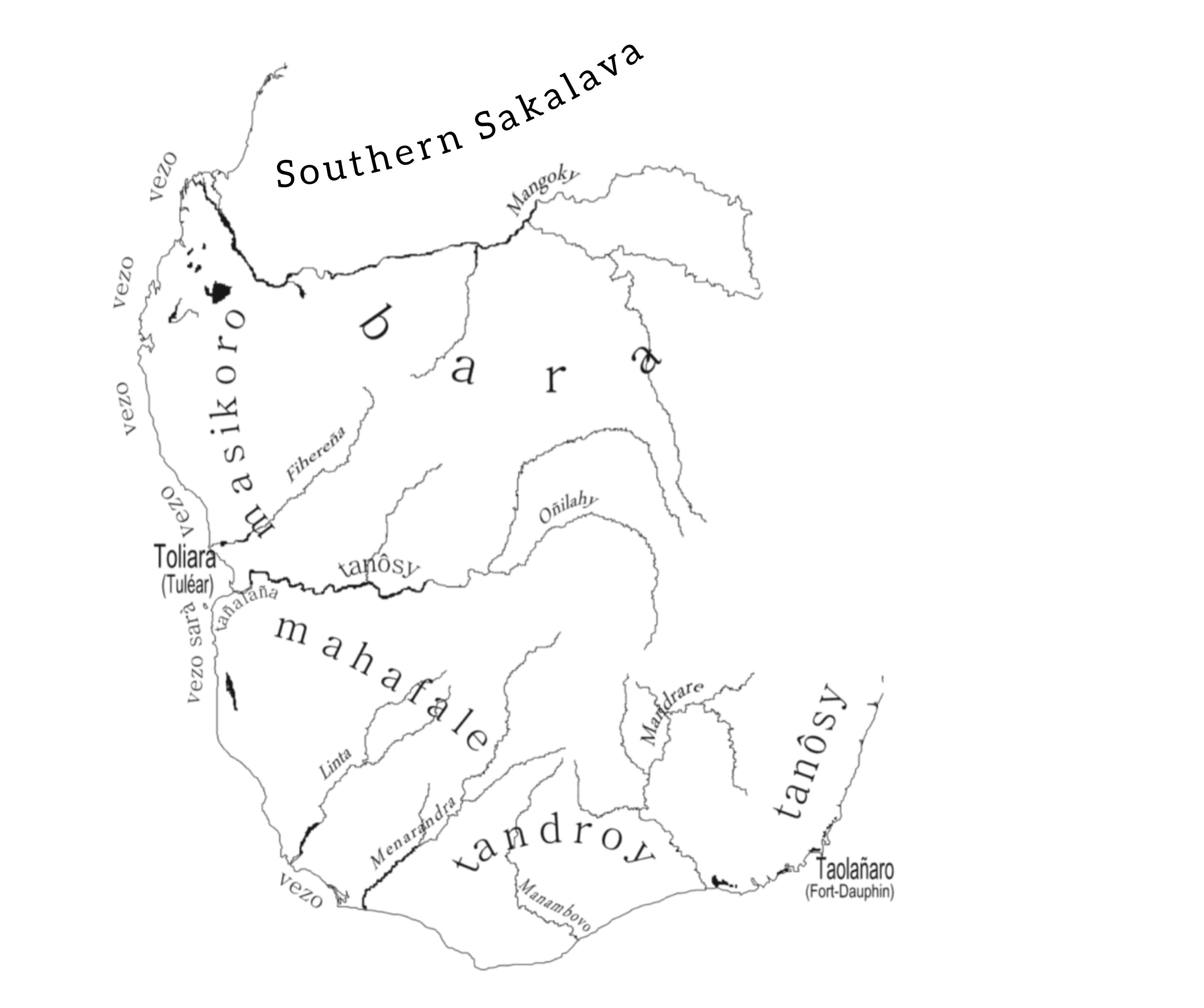
- Native to: Madagascar
- Region: Androy
- Ethnicity: Antandroy people
- Native speakers: 1,442,000
- Language family: Austronesian: Malayo-Polynesian; Barito languages; Malagasy; Southern Malagasic; Tandroy
- Writing system: Latin script (Malagasy alphabet)

Language codes
- ISO 639-3: tdx
- Glottolog: tand1256
- Linguasphere: 31-LDA-ca
- Antandroy dialect sample 1 Antandroy women expressing gratitude to the Centre technique agroécologique du Sud (CTAS) project for enabling the education of their children. Antandroy dialect sample 2 A Tandroy woman speaks about her involvement in an anti-desertification project in Itokoala, a coastal area of Androy.

Tandroy (also called Antandroy or Ntandroy) is a dialect of the Malagasy language spoken primarily by the Antandroy people in the Androy region of southern Madagascar. It is close to Mahafaly and Karimbola, the latter being considered a dialect of Tandroy.

== Classification ==
Tandroy is part of the Austronesian languages family, within the Malayo-Polynesian languages branch. It falls under the Barito languages group and is classified specifically as a member of the Southern Malagasic subgroup of Malagasy dialects, alongside Karimbola, Vezo, Masikoro, Southern Sakalava and Mahafaly.

== Geographic distribution ==
The Tandroy dialect is spoken mainly in the Androy region, the southernmost part of Madagascar, by approximately 1,442,000 people (as of 2025). It is also spoken by the Antandroy diaspora in Bongolava and northern regions of Madagascar.

== History ==
Tandroy is among the Malagasy dialects documented in the early 18th century. It is the dialect that Robert Drury (sailor), an English sailor, learned after being shipwrecked in the Androy region in 1702, where he lived as a slave until his escape. Drury fled northward through Fiherenana and later reached Menabe, from where he eventually sailed back to England in 1717. All of these regions spoke dialects closely related to Tandroy, which helped him communicate throughout his journey. His memoir includes a very valuable list of over 500 Malagasy words, believed to reflect the Tandroy dialect and other southern varieties.

== Vocabulary ==
Tandroy Vocabulary Table with Standard Malagasy and Gloss
| # | Gloss | Tandroy | Standard Malagasy |
|---|---|---|---|
Family
| 1 | Wife / Husband | Valy | Vady |
Pronouns
| 2 | I / Me | Raho / Zaho | Izaho |
| 3 | You (singular) | Rehe / Riha / Ihe | Ianao |
| 4 | He | Reke / Ihe | Izy |
| 5 | We | Tika / Tikagne / Zahay | Isika / Izahay |
| 6 | You (plural) | Nahareo / Nareo / Inahareo | Ianareo |
| 7 | They | Iereo / Iareo | Zareo |
Qualities & Descriptions
| 8 | Good / Beautiful | Soa | Tsara |
| 9 | Only | Avao | Ihany |
| 10 | Taboo | Faly | Fady |
Conditionals & Connectors
| 11 | If | Lehe | Raha |
Actions & Verbs
| 12 | To shoot | Mitifitse | Mitifitra |
| 13 | To enter | Militse | Miditra |
| 14 | To exit | Miakatse | Mivoaka |
| 15 | To follow | Magnorike | Manaraka |
Directions
| 16 | South | Antimo | Atsimo |

== Some Tandroy proverbs ==
| Tandroy proverb | Merina proverb | English translation |
|---|---|---|
| Ana-tsiriry tsy toroan-dagno | Zanak'omby tsy ampianarin-domano | A calf is not taught by the tail of another calf |
| Faly lambo i Tsipioke, tsy homagne ty vente'e faie midrofotse ty ro'e | Mihambo ho tsy tia vary mohaka nefa miletra sosoa be rano | Proud to dislike rice but always licking the broth |
| Tandriondriono maola mahazo ty marentane | Tsingeringerin'ankizy ka ny lehibe avy no fanina | Children quarrel, but the eldest wins |
| Tsy to rehake ty tsy manam-bangovango | Izay manan-tsira mahay mahandro | Whoever has spice knows how to cook |
| Tsy mote ty havelo hamonje ze miroro | Aza manao ariary zato am-pandriana | Don’t put a hundred ariary on the bed |
| Nahalavamoko i akanga y o, o fitaoagne o | Ny mahery tsy maody tsy ela velona | The strong who does not yield will not live long |
