= Deyah language =

Austronesian language spoken in Kalimantan, Indonesia

Deyah
- Daiah; Deah; Deyah; Daiak; Deak; Deyak
- Native to: Indonesia
- Region: South Kalimantan
- Ethnicity: Deah
- Native speakers: (20,000 cited 1981)
- Language family: Austronesian: Malayo-Polynesian; Barito; East Barito; Central–South East Barito; Deyah

Language codes
- ISO 639-3: dun
- Glottolog: dusu1271

Daiah, Deah, Deyah, Daiak, Deak, Deyak is an Austronesian language belonging to the eastern branch of the Barito language family, natively spoken by the Deah – a Dayak ethnic group native to the South Kalimantan, Indonesia. It is indigenously spoken specifically in Tabalong Regency across two districts, namely Haruai and Muara Uya, at the villages of Kinarum, Kaong, Pangelak, Bilas, and Mangkupum.
