= Poroani =

Village in the French overseas department of Mayotte

Coordinates: 12°53′33″S 45°8′30″E

Poroani is a village in the commune of Chirongui on Mayotte.
