= Northern Sakalava dialect =

Austronesian language of Madagascar

Northern Sakalava
- Native to: Madagascar
- Ethnicity: Boina Sakalava
- Language family: Austronesian: Malayo-Polynesian; Western Indonesian; Barito; East Barito; Northern Malagasic; Northern Sakalava
- Writing system: Latin script (Malagasy alphabet)

Language codes
- ISO 639-3: skg
- Glottolog: maju1234
- Linguasphere: 31-LDA-dc (Majunga); 31-LDA-ea (Analalava); 31-LDA-ea (Nosy Be)
- Northern Sakalava – Majunga The wife of a castaway recalling her husband's survival at sea and rescue, then thanking the authorities in Majunga for their help to her husband and family. Northern Sakalava – Analalava A woman from the district of Analalava complains in the Northern Sakalava dialect about recurring abuse and negligence in the region.

Northern Sakalava is a northern dialect of Malagasy spoken by Sakalava people especially in the region of Boeny and Sofia.

== Classification ==
Northern Sakalava dialect belongs to the Austronesian language family. It is part of Northern Malagasy subgroup along with Tsimihety, Bushi, Northern Betsimisaraka and Antakarana.

== Territorial Range ==
Northern Sakalava is the primary dialect spoken in the former province of Mahajanga, and it is the primary dialect of the city of Mahajanga (Majunga). It is also spoken in parts of the Betsiboka Region. In addition, it is spoken in the Sofia Region, particularly in the Analalava District, and in the Diana Region, especially in the Ambanja District and on the island of Nosy Be.

== Vocabulary ==
Numbers & Connectors
#	Gloss	Standard Malagasy	Northern Sakalava
1	One	Iray	Araiky
2	And	Sy	Ndreky
3	All	Rehetra / Avy	Jiaby / Aby
4	So	Ka	Ke

Concepts & Abstracts
#	Gloss	Standard Malagasy	Northern Sakalava
1	Thing	Zavatra	Raha
2	Mind	Saina	Jery
3	Difficulty	Fahasarotana	Sarotro
4	Wealth	Harena	Hariagna

Descriptions
#	Gloss	Standard Malagasy	Northern Sakalava
1	Beautiful	Tsara	Meva

Nature
#	Gloss	Standard Malagasy	Northern Sakalava
1	Sky / Heaven	Lanitra	Lagnitry

Verbs
#	Gloss	Standard Malagasy	Northern Sakalava
1	To watch	Mijery	Mizaha

Possession & Qualities
#	Gloss	Standard Malagasy	Northern Sakalava
1	His/Her goodness	Hatsarany	Hatsarananany
2	His/Her strength	Heriny	Angovonazy
3	His/Her student	Mpianany	Mpianatranany

Example Phrase
#	Gloss	Standard Malagasy	Northern Sakalava
1	Henry arrived	Tonga i Henry	Navy i Henry
