= Tanosy dialect =

Austronesian language of Madagascar

Tanosy
- Native to: Madagascar
- Ethnicity: Tanosy people
- Native speakers: 913,000
- Language family: Austronesian: Malayo-Polynesian; Western Indonesian; Barito; East Barito; Southern Malagasic; Tanosy
- Writing system: Latin script (Malagasy alphabet)

Language codes
- ISO 639-3: txy
- Glottolog: tano1246
- Linguasphere: 31-LDA-bg
- Tanosy – Amboatabo The mayor of Amboatabo, a rural commune in Fort-Dauphin District, introducing his commune. Tanosy – Rural Fort-Dauphin A woman from a rural area of Fort-Dauphin talks about cultivating and selling vanilla. Tanosy – Analapatsy A woman in Analapatsy (Fort-Dauphin District) talks about the ongoing water shortage in her commune.

Tanosy is a dialect of Malagasy spoken by Tanosy people in South-eastern Madagascar.

== Classification ==
Tanosy dialect belongs to the Austronesian language family and part of Southern malagasy subgroup.

== Territorial range ==
Tanosy is spoken in the Anosy region, especially in the Taolanaro District, and is the primary dialect spoken in the city of Fort-Dauphin. A community of Tanosy emigrés also exists in Bezaha, located in Atsimo-Andrefana, where their dialect is influenced by neighboring Mahafaly and Bara.

== Characteristics ==
The Tanosy dialect exhibits distinctive linguistic features, many of which are shared with both Southern and Southeastern Malagasy dialects.

One notable characteristic is the omission of the final -na in trisyllabic words. For example, vola is used instead of volana (month), toèra for toerana (place), and sofy for sofina (ear). Likewise, mijanona (to stop) becomes mijano.

There is also a tendency to substitute the consonant l for d, as seen in examples like valy for vady (spouse), and malio for madio (clean).

The consonant v may be replaced by b, a feature found in forms such as mivoaka for miboaka (to get out).

Words ending in -tra are often transformed into -tsy, a common phonological pattern in southern Malagasy varieties. For instance, mahafantatra (to know) becomes mahafantatsy, manolotra (to present) becomes manolotsy, and efatra (four) becomes efatsy. Similarly, lavitra (far) becomes lavitsy.

In the Tanosy dialect, the suffix -ka regularly shifts to -ky, a trait it shares with other southeastern varieties. Examples include mangataka (to ask) becoming mangataky, tafavoaka (successful) becoming tafavoaky, and ravaka (necklace) becoming ravaky. In some cases, the -ka is dropped altogether, as in fasika (sand), which becomes fasy.

Unlike many other southern dialects, the consonant z is rarely dropped in Tanosy. Words such as izaho (I) and izy (he/she) remain intact. Some partial z-reduction is found, such as aiza (where) becoming eza, but words like iza (who) remain unchanged. This stands in contrast to dialects such as Bara, which uses ahay for izahay, and Tandroy, which substitutes ihe for izy. Other dialects like Masikoro, Southern Sakalava, and Bara use ihy instead of izy. In Tanosy, however, the z is retained, and forms like izaho are not reduced to iaho.

Another distinguishing feature is the preservation of the consonant s following t, which is often dropped in other southern dialects. For example, while some dialects change ratsy (bad) to raty and vitsika (ant) to vitiky, Tanosy maintains the original forms: ratsy and vitsiky.

Additionally, number counting in the Tanosy dialect sometimes follows a left-to-right (largest to smallest unit) structure, similar to European languages. For instance, the number 14,850 (listen to first audio) is expressed as:

Ray aly sy efatsy arivo sy valonzato sy dimampolo

This contrasts with Standard Malagasy, which counts from smallest to largest unit (right to left):

Dimampolo sy valonzato sy efatra arivo sy iray alina

This counting order is characteristic of both Northern and Southern Malagasy dialects, but it is generally absent in the Central-Eastern Malagasy group, to which Standard Malagasy belongs.

Lexical Comparison Between Tanosy And Neighbouring Antesaka and Antefasy
#	Gloss	Standard Malagasy	Tanosy	Antesaka	Antefasy
1	Few	Vitsy	Vintsy	Vitsy	Vitsy
2	Road	Lalana	Lala	Lala	Lalagny
3	Smart	Mahiratra	Mahiratsy	Mahiratry	Mahiratry
4	Only	Ihany	Avao	Avao	Avao
5	Night	Alina	Aly	Aly	Aligny
6	Cold	Mangatsiaka	Manara	Manara	Mangatseky
7	Messy	Mikorontana	Mikoronta	Mikoronta	Mikorontagny
8	Sharp	Maranitra	Marangitsy	Marangitry	Marangitry
9	Ghost	Angatra	Angatsy	Angatry	Angatry
10	To animate	Manentana	Magnenta	Magnenta	Magnentagny
11	To return something	Mampody	Magnampoly	Magnampody	Magnampody
12	To look for	Mitady	Mitalia	Mitady	Mitady

== Vocabulary ==
Numbers
#	Gloss	Standard Malagasy	Tanosy
1	One	Iray / Isa	Raiky / Isa

Pronouns
#	Gloss	Standard Malagasy	Tanosy
1	You (plural)	Anareo	Andrareo
2	We / Us	Isika	Atsika

Articles
#	Gloss	Standard Malagasy	Tanosy
1	The	Ny	Gny
2	That / Who / Which	No / Izay	Gny
3	From	Avy any	Lahatè

Possessive Pronouns
#	Gloss	Standard Malagasy	Tanosy
1	Mine	Anahy	Anahy
2	Yours (singular)	Anao	Anao
3	His / Hers	Anazy	Anazy
4	Ours (inclusive)	Antsika	Atsika
5	Ours (exclusive)	Anay	Anzahay
6	Yours (plural)	Anareo	Anareo
7	Theirs	Azy ireo	An’ireo

Abstract Nouns
#	Gloss	Standard Malagasy	Tanosy
1	Suffering	Fijaliana	Fijalia
2	Wife / Husband	Vady	Valy
3	Angel	Anjely	Ajely

Animals
#	Gloss	Standard Malagasy	Tanosy
1	Sheep	Ondry	Agnondry
2	Cow	Omby	Agnomby

Tools
#	Gloss	Standard Malagasy	Tanosy
1	Knife	Antsy	Mesa

Time
#	Gloss	Standard Malagasy	Tanosy
1	Week	Herinandro	Erignandro
2	Year	Taona	Tao

Economy
#	Gloss	Standard Malagasy	Tanosy
1	Tax	Hetra	Vilin-doha

Actions
#	Gloss	Standard Malagasy	Tanosy
1	To seek	Mitady	Mitaly
2	To sit	Mipetraka	Mitoboky

Adjectives
#	Gloss	Standard Malagasy	Tanosy
1	Smart	Mahiratra	Mahiratsy

Adverbs / Modifiers
#	Gloss	Standard Malagasy	Tanosy
1	Only	Ihany	Avao
2	Still	Mbola	Mbo / Avao

Conjunctions
#	Gloss	Standard Malagasy	Tanosy
1	Because	Satria	Satria
2	But	Fa	Fa
3	Even	Na	Ndre
4	Even though	Na dia	Ndrefa
5	However	Kanefa	Kanefa
6	Later	Avy eo	Lafa avy eo
7	Here / There (general location)	Eo	Eo
8	Neither... nor...	Tsy ... tsy koa	Tsy ... tsy koa
9	Nonetheless	Kanefa	Kanefa
10	Or	Na / Sa	Na / Sa
11	So	Dia	Da
12	Too / Also	Koa	Koa
13	When	Rehefa	Nofa

== Writing system ==
The Zafiraminia among the Tanosy were the ones who used Sorabe, an Arabic-derived script, to write manuscripts in the Tanosy dialect. These writings dealt with subjects such as geomancy, astrology, medicine, and other magical or divinatory practices. The use of Sorabe was shared with the Antambahoaka, who are also of Zafiraminia origin, and the Antemoro of the Agnakara clan.
