= Masikoro dialect =

Austronesian language of Madagascar

Masikoro
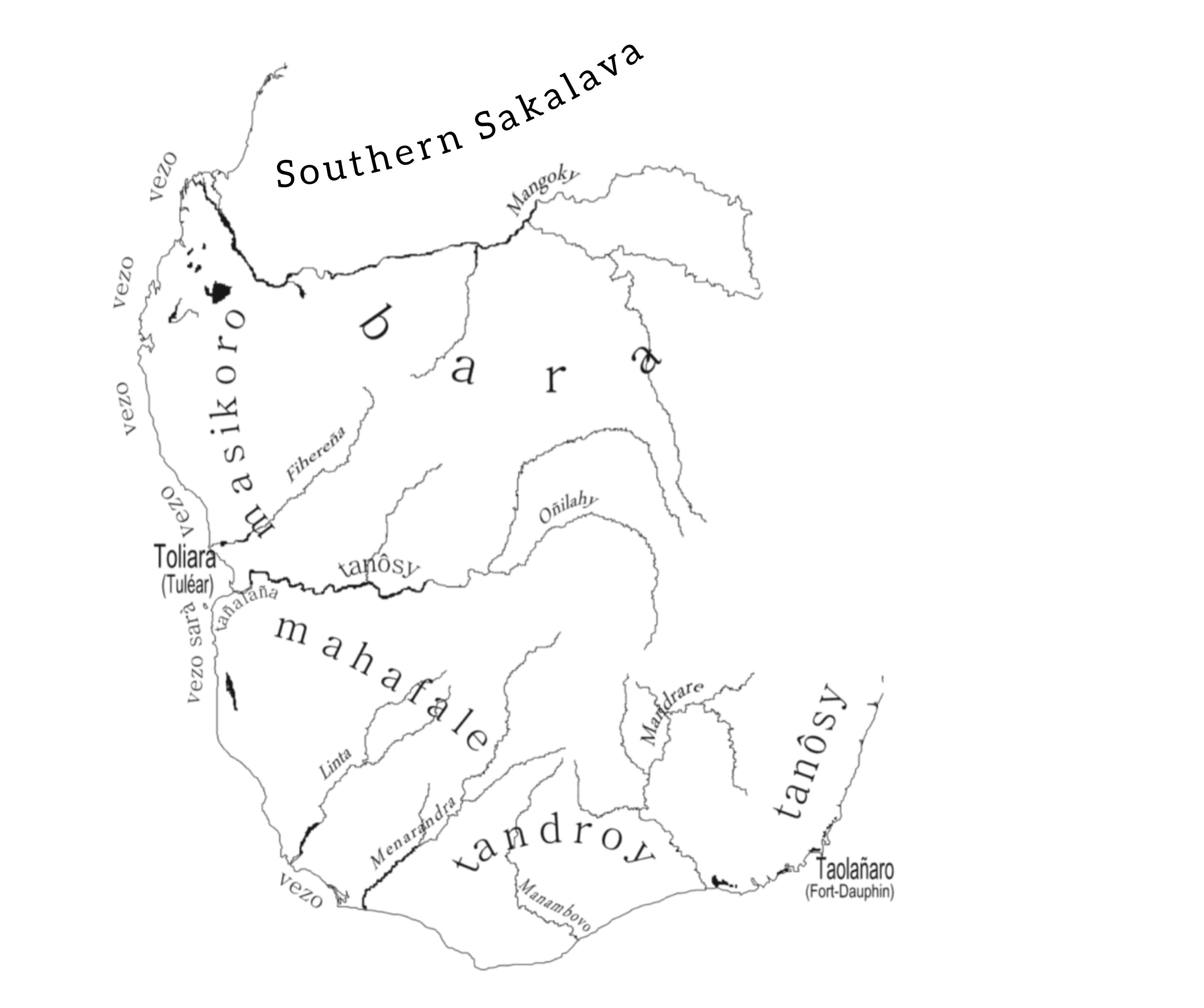
- Native to: Madagascar
- Ethnicity: Masikoro people
- Native speakers: 821,000
- Language family: Austronesian: Malayo-Polynesian; Western Indonesian; Barito; East Barito; Southern Malagasic; Masikoro
- Writing system: Latin script (Malagasy alphabet)

Language codes
- ISO 639-3: –
- Glottolog: masi1273
- Linguasphere: 31-LDA-cf
- Masikoro dialect sample 1 Masikoro people explaining their opposition to the Base Toliara mining project. Masikoro dialect sample 2 A Masikoro woman opposed to the Base Toliara Project judging it won't benefit her children's future.

Masikoro is a dialect of Malagasy spoken by Masikoro in the province of Toliara.

== Classification ==
Masikoro dialect belongs to the Austronesian language family and part of the subgroup of malagasy dialect known as Southern malagasic. It's very close to Vezo and Southern Sakalava.

== Geographic distribution ==
Masikoro is a very popular dialect in the inland of Atsimo Andrefana while Vezo dialect dominated its coast.

== Vocabulary ==
Masikoro Vocabulary with Standard Malagasy comparison
#	Gloss	Standard Malagasy	Masikoro
1	To accept	Manaiky	Magnenky
2	If	Raha	Laha
3	Girl / Woman	Vehivavy	Ampela
4	Fear	Matahotra	Matahotsy
5	Only / Also	Ihany / Foana	Avao
6	Who	Iza	Ia
7	From	Avy	Baka
8	Not yet	Tsy mbola	Mbo
9	Opinion	Hevitra	Hevitsy
10	Near	Eo akaiky	Mariniky
11	How	Ahoana	Ahoa
12	Hungry	Noana	Masaregny
13	Witness	Vavolombelona	Vavolombelo
14	When	Rehefa	Lahafa
15	Five	Dimy	Limy
16	Where	Aiza	Aia
17	Now / At the present time	Amin’izao fotoana izao	Ananikizao
18	They	Zareo	Rozy
19	I	Izaho	Raho
20	Weapon	Fitaovam-piadiana	Fitaovapiadia
