= Southern Betsimisaraka dialect =

Austronesian language of Madagascar

Southern Betsimisaraka
- Fiteny Betsimisaraka Atsimo
- Native to: Madagascar
- Ethnicity: Betsimisaraka
- Native speakers: 3,493,000
- Language family: Austronesian: Malayo-Polynesian; Western Indonesian; Barito; East Barito; Central-Eastern Malagasic; Southern Betsimisaraka
- Writing system: Latin script (Malagasy alphabet)

Language codes
- ISO 639-3: bzc
- Glottolog: sout2920
- Linguasphere: 31-LDA-ad
- Southern Betsimisaraka (speech) Pierrot Rajaonarivelo promising to give jobs if elected in the 2013 presidential election. Southern Betsimisaraka (Marolambo) A man from Marolambo, recorded during an interview conducted by a reporter from Analalava Explorer, discussing the traditional method of producing Malagasy liquor (toaka gasy). Southern Betsimisaraka (Mahanoro) Three people from Sahanivanona in the district of Mahanoro talking about a fire that broke out in their village.

Southern Betsimisaraka is a dialect of Malagasy spoken by Southern Betsimisaraka people in Eastern Madagascar.

== Classification ==
Southern Betsimisaraka is an Austronesian language part of the Central-Eastern Malagasic branch of Malagasy.

== Geographical distribution ==
The Southern Betsimisaraka dialect is spoken in the regions of Atsinanana, particularly in Mahanoro District, Marolambo District, and Vatomandry District. It is also found in the Alaotra-Mangoro region, specifically in the Anosibe An'ala District, as well as in northern Vatovavy, notably in the Nosy Varika District.

== Vocabulary ==
Southern Betsimisaraka Vocabulary Compared with Standard Malagasy
#	Gloss	Malagasy standard	Southern Betsimisaraka
Numbers
1	One	Iray / Isa	Iraika / Isa
Pronouns
2	I / Me	Izaho	Izaho
3	We (exclusive)	Anay	Aney
4	We (inclusive)	Isika	Antsena
5	They / Them	Ireo / Zareo	Zarô / Zare
Quantifiers / Determiners
6	Each / Every	Tsirairay	Tsirekireky
Places & Direction
7	From	Avy	Avy
8	Here	Eto	Aketo / Etoagna
9	Where	Aiza	Akeza
10	In	Tany / Any	Takagny / Akagny
11	Far	Lavitra	Alavitra
People & Family
12	Man	Lehilahy	Lilahe
13	Woman	Vehivavy	Viave
14	Grandfather	Raibe / Papa be	Papa by
15	Grandmother	Renibe / Mamabe / Nenibe	Mamaby / Bebe
16	Father	Ray / Papa	Papa / Iazagna
17	Mother	Mama / Neny	Mama / Niny
18	Family (his/her/their)	Fianakaviany	Fianakaviane
19	Priority	Laharapahamehina	Laharapahamehigna
Animals & Nature
20	Snake	Bibilava	Fomba
21	Cow	Omby	Aombe
Days of the Week
22	Monday	Alatsinainy	Alatsinena
Verbs / Actions
23	Burned	May	Kila
