= Northern Betsimisaraka dialect =

Austronesian language of Madagascar

Northern Betsimisaraka
- Fiteny Betsimisaraka Avaratra
- Native to: Madagascar
- Ethnicity: Northern Betsimisaraka people
- Native speakers: 1,799,000
- Language family: Austronesian: Malayo-Polynesian; Western Indonesian; Barito; East Barito; Northern Malagasic; Northern Betsimisaraka
- Writing system: Latin script (Malagasy alphabet)

Language codes
- ISO 639-3: bzc
- Glottolog: nort2890
- Linguasphere: 31-LDA-ac
- Northern Betsimisaraka (Antsirabe Nord) Gospel in Northern Betsimisaraka. Northern Betsimisaraka (Fénérive Est) Two elderly people thank a doctor for all his efforts on healing them.

Northern Betsimisaraka is a northern dialect of Malagasy spoken by the Northern Betsimisaraka people.

== Classification ==
Northern Betsimisaraka dialect belongs to the Austronesian language family and is part of the Northern Malagasic branch.

== Geographic distribution ==
The Northern Betsimisaraka dialect is primarily spoken in the Sava Region, Analanjirofo Region (including the island of Sainte-Marie), and Atsinanana Region. It is also the popular dialect of the city of Toamasina (Tamatave), and is used by members of the Northern Betsimisaraka diaspora residing in the capital city, Antananarivo.

== Vocabulary ==
Comparison of Selected Vocabulary in Standard Malagasy and Northern Betsimisaraka Dialect
#	Gloss	Standard Malagasy	Northern Betsimisaraka
Vocabulary
1	One	Isa / Iray	Isa / Araiky
2	All	Rehetra / Avy	Jiaby
3	Already	Efa	Afa
4	Father	Ray	Ada
5	Man	Lehilahy	Lalaha
6	Woman	Vehivavy	Viavy
7	His name	Anarany	Agnaragnanazy
8	He made	Nataony	Nanony
9	His strength	Heriny	Herenazy
10	I created	Izaho no namorona	Za namorogno
11	My name is Angelah	Izaho dia Angelah / Ny anarako dia Angelah	Za zegny agnaragnanahy Angelah
12	21 years old	Iraika ambin'ny roapolo taona	Araiky ambiny rôpolo taogno
