= East Barito languages =

Group of Austronesian languages

East Barito
- Geographic distribution: Indonesia (south Borneo); Madagascar
- Linguistic classification: Austronesian: Malayo-Polynesian; (Barito); East Barito
- Proto-language: Proto-East Barito

Language codes
- Glottolog: east2713

The East Barito languages are a group of a dozen Dayak (Austronesian) languages of Borneo, Indonesia, and most notably Malagasy, the national language of Madagascar. They are named after the Barito River located in Central and South Kalimantan, Indonesia.

The languages are:

- Central–South
  - Dusun Deyah
  - South: Dusun Malang, Dusun Witu, Ma'anyan, Paku
- Malagasy (incl. Bushi on Mayotte)
- North: Lawangan, Tawoyan

Several of the languages are named 'Dusun' because they are spoken by the Dusun people; they are not to be confused with the Dusunic languages, which are also spoken by the Dusun but belong to a different branch of Malayo-Polynesian.

The most described East Barito language is Malagasy, which is also the best known language of the Barito group. South East Borneo is considered to be the original homeland of Malagasy. Malagasy is thought to have been brought to the East Africa region by Austronesian-speaking migrants between the 7th and 13th centuries. Some linguistic evidence suggests that a distinct Malagasy language variety had already emerged in Borneo before the early Malagasy migrants reached Madagascar.

== See also ==
- Languages of Indonesia
- Languages of Madagascar
- Indonesians
- Overseas Indonesians
