= Sahavoay =

Ethnic group in Madagascar

Regions with significant populations
- Atsimo Atsinanana

Languages
- Sahavoay

Religion
- Traditional beliefs and Christianity (Minority)

Related ethnic groups
- Sahafatra, Antefasy

The Sahavoay are an ethnic group from the Farafangana District, in the Atsimo Atsinanana region, Madagascar.

== Location ==
The Sahavoay are primarily located in the Farafangana District, within the Atsimo Atsinanana region of Madagascar. They are especially concentrated in the communes of Bevoay,Ambohigogo, Maheriraty and Ambohimandroso.

== Recognition ==
The Sahavoay like the Karimbola, Vezo, Mikea and the Sahafatra aren't included in the 18 officially recognized tribes of Madagascar despite being a full-fledged ethnic group. They are registered as Antaifasy in official documents.

== History ==
The Sahavoay and the Sahafatra were considered among the most remote tribes on Madagascar's east coast in the 19th century and are recognized as the earliest known inhabitants of the Farafangana District. Related isolated groups to the Sahavoay and Sahafatra are regarded as the first inhabitants of southeastern Madagascar, though they are not well documented and were largely assimilated by later arrivals such as the Antemoro, Antaifasy, Antaisaka, and Antambahoaka.

Over time, the Sahavoay lost parts of their ancestral territory due to the expansion of groups from the west, likely of Sakalava or Bara origin, who became the Antaisaka and Antefasy. Many Sahavoay were assimilated by these groups—particularly the Antaisaka subgroups such as the Zaramanampy and Zarafagniliha as well as by the Antefasy of the Ndremamory clan. However, those who remained unassimilated continue to inhabit their present territory.

== Clans ==
The Sahavoay are traditionally divided into three clans:

- Marohava
- Mahasaka
- Andrakony

== Economy ==
The Sahavoay are primarily engaged in agriculture. Their economic activities include the cultivation of both subsistence and cash crops. Key export-oriented products include Coffee, cloves, and black pepper, while rice remains a staple crop cultivated for local consumption.

== See also ==
- Ethnic groups in Madagascar
- Malagasy people
- Atsimo Atsinanana

== Bibliography ==
- Marc Bied‑Charreton. La Côte sud‑est de Madagascar. Étude géographique et problèmes posés par l'intensification de l'agriculture. Thèse de doctorat de troisième cycle. Faculté des Lettres et des Sciences humaines, École Pratique des Hautes Études (VI^{e} section), soutenue le 17 mars 1972. Directeur d'études : G. Sautter. Tome 1, ORSTOM, Paris, 1972. PDF
- Hubert Deschamps & Suzanne Vianès. Les Malgaches du Sud-Est : Antemoro, Antesaka, Antambahoaka, peuples de Farafangana (Antefasi, Zafisoro, Sahavoai, Sahafatra). Monographies ethnologiques n^{o} 1, Presses universitaires de France, Paris, 1959, 118 p.
