= Sahavoay dialect =

Austronesian language of Madagascar

Sahavoay
- Native to: Madagascar
- Ethnicity: Sahavoay
- Language family: Austronesian: Malayo-Polynesian; Western Indonesian; Barito; East Barito; Central-Eastern Malagasic; Plateaux Malagasy; Antefasy–Antemoro; Sahavoay
- Writing system: Latin script (Malagasy alphabet)

Language codes
- ISO 639-3: –
- Sahavoay dialect sample (Maheriraty) A woman thanking project AFAFI Sud for the help in improving their life

Sahavoay is a dialect of the Malagasy language spoken by the Sahavoay ethnic group in Atsimo Atsinanana, Madagascar.

== Classification ==
Sahavoay is part of the Austronesian language family, within the Central-Eastern Malagasic branch. It is further classified under the Plateaux Malagasy and Antefasy–Antemoro subgroups.

== Geographical distribution ==
The Sahavoay dialect is spoken in the communes of Bevoay, Ambohigogo, Maheriraty and Ambohimandroso in the Farafangana district.

== Characteristics ==
Sahavoay is most similar to the Antaifasy dialect, with which it shares many phonological and lexical features.

Comparison of Selected Vocabulary in Standard Malagasy and Sahavoay Dialect
#	Gloss	Standard Malagasy	Sahavoay
Vocabulary
1	One	Iray	Raiky
2	I	Aho	Iaho
3	We (exclusive)	Izahay	Ahay
4	We (inclusive)	Isika	Atsika
5	They	Izy ireo	Indreo
6	Rice	Vary	Vary
7	Cow	Omby	Aomby
8	Mountain	Tendrombohitra	Vohitry
9	To climb	Miakatra	Magnaniky
10	House	Trano	Tragno
11	Since	Hatramin’ny	Lahata
12	If	Raha	Laha
