= Zafisoro dialect =

Coastal dialect of Malagasy

Zafisoro
- Native to: Madagascar
- Ethnicity: Zafisoro people
- Native speakers: 146,000 (2025)
- Language family: Austronesian: Malayo‑Polynesian; Western Indonesian; Barito; East Barito; Central-Eastern Malagasic; Plateau Malagasy; Antemoro–Antefasy; Zafisoro
- Writing system: Latin script (Malagasy alphabet)

Language codes
- ISO 639-1: Mg
- ISO 639-3: Plt
- Glottolog: zafi1234
- Linguasphere: 31-LDA-bc

Zafisoro is a coastal dialect of the Malagasy language spoken by the Zafisoro people in the northwestern part of the Farafangana District in southeastern Madagascar.

== Classification ==
Zafisoro belongs to the Austronesian languages family, under the Malayo-Polynesian languages branch. It is part of the Western Indonesian languages, specifically the Barito languages group and its Eastern Barito subgroup.

Within Malagasy, Zafisoro falls under the Central-Eastern Malagasic cluster, more precisely in the Plateau Malagasy division and the Antemoro–Antefasy subgroup.

== Geographic distribution ==
The dialect is spoken in and around the localities of Evato, Mahafasa Afovoany, Amporoforo, and Ambalatany. These areas represent the core territory of the Zafisoro within the Farafangana District.
