= Antaifasy dialect =

Austronesian language of Madagascar

Antaifasy
- Zakan'Atefasy
- Native to: Madagascar
- Ethnicity: Antaifasy
- Native speakers: 254,000
- Language family: Austronesian: Malayo-Polynesian; Western Indonesian; Barito; East Barito; Central-Eastern Malagasic; Plateau malagasy; Antaifasy
- Writing system: Latin script (Malagasy alphabet)

Language codes
- ISO 639-1: Mg
- ISO 639-3: Plt
- Linguasphere: 31-LDA-be

Antaifasy is a dialect of Malagasy spoken by Antaifasy people and the main dialect around the Farafangana district.

== Classification ==
Antefasy is an Austronesian language part of the Plateaux malagasy group.

== Characteristics ==
Antaifasy is very similar and it can be mistaken to Antaimoro dialect. The difference between the two dialects are quiet small.

== Geographic distribution ==
The Antefasy dialect is widely spoken in the region of Atsimo Atsinanana, particularly in Farafangana district. It is the primary dialect spoken in the city of Farafangana. Within Farafangana district, it is spoken in the communes of Anosivelo, Anosy Tsararafa, Farafangana, Ivandrika, Vohimasy, and Vohitromby.

== Vocabulary ==
=== Numerals ===
English	Malagasy Standard	Antaifasy
One	Iray / Isa	Raiky or Isa
Two	Roa	Roy
Three	Telo	Telo
Four	Efatra	Efatry
Five	Dimy	Dimy
Six	Enina	Enina
Seven	Fito	Fito
Eight	Valo	Valo
Nine	Sivy	Sivy
Ten	Folo	Folo
Eleven	Iraika ambin'ny folo	Raiky amby folo
Twelve	Roa ambin'ny folo	Roy amby folo
Thirteen	Telo ambin'ny folo	Telo amby folo
Fourteen	Efatra ambin'ny folo	Efatry amby folo
Fifteen	Dimy ambin'ny folo	Dimy amby folo
Sixteen	Enina ambin'ny folo	Enina amby folo
Seventeen	Fito ambin'ny folo	Fito amby folo
Eighteen	Valo ambin'ny folo	Valo amby folo
Nineteen	Sivy ambin'ny folo	Sivy amby folo
Twenty	Roapolo	Roapolo
Thirty	Telopolo	Telopolo
Forty	Efapolo	Efapolo
Fifty	Dimampolo	Dimapolo
Sixty	Enimpolo	Enimpolo
Seventy	Fitopolo	Fitopolo
Eighty	Valopolo	Valopolo
Ninety	Sivifolo	Sivifolo
Hundred	Zato	Zato
One Thousand	Arivo	Arivo
Ten thousand	Iray halina	Ray haligny
One hundred thousand	Iray hetsy	Ray hetsy
One million	Tapitrisa	Ray Tapitrisa
One billion	Lavitrisa	1 miliara (from French)

=== Animals ===
English	Malagasy Standard	Antefasy
Dog	Alika	Amboa
Crow	Goaika	Goaky
Chicken	Akoho	Akoho
Cow	Omby	Aomby
Bird	Vorona	Vorogny
Animal	Biby	Biby
Fish	Trondro	Laokandrano
Goat	Osy	Osy
Horse	Soavaly	Sôvaly
Lemur	Gidro	Variky
Monkey	Babakoto	Razako
Mouse	Totozy	Voalavo
Pork	Kisoa	Kisoa
Pigeon	Voromailala	Voromamanga
Sheep	Ondry	Ondry
Snake	Bibilava	Bibilava
Turkey	Voritsiloza	Bitsibitsy

=== Direction ===
English	Malagasy Standard	Antefasy
North	Avaratra	Avaratry
South	Atsimo	Atsimo
East	Atsinanana	Atsignanagny
West	Andrefana	Andrefagny

=== Time ===
English	Malagasy Standard	Antefasy
Day	Andro	Andro
Night	Alina	Aligny
Morning	Maraina	Maraigny
Afternoon	Tolakandro	Sodrignandro
Evening	Hariva	Hariva
Week	Herinandro	Herignandro
Month	Volana	Volagny
Year	Taona	Taogny
Minute	Minitra	Minitry
Second	Segondra	Segôndy

=== Colors ===
English	Malagasy Standard	Antefasy
Red	Mena	Mena
Blue	Manga	Manga
Yellow	Mavo	Jônina
Green	Maitso	Mentso
Black	Mainty	Mity
White	Fotsy	Fotsy
Brown	volontsôkôlà	Marôn
Pink	Mavokely	Rôzy
Purple	Volomparasy	Voloparasy
