= Antesaka dialect =

Austronesian dialect of southeastern Madagascar

Antesaka
- Tesaka
- Native to: Madagascar
- Ethnicity: Antesaka
- Native speakers: 1,969,000
- Language family: Austronesian: Malayo-Polynesian; Western Indonesian; Barito; East Barito; Central-Eastern Malagasic; Antesaka
- Writing system: Latin script (Malagasy alphabet)

Language codes
- ISO 639-3: tkg
- Glottolog: anta1261
- Linguasphere: 31-LDA-bf
- Antesaka dialect (Midongy Atsimo) An elderly couple from Midongy Atsimo speak in the Antesaka dialect about the hardships of daily life. Antesaka dialect (Midongy Atsimo) The same elderly couple from Midongy Atsimo discuss feeling trapped in their region, unable to visit other parts of Madagascar, even nearby areas like Farafangana and Vangaindrano. Antesaka dialect (Efatsy) A woman from Efatsy expresses gratitude in the Antesaka dialect for inheriting land from her father.

Tesaka is a dialect of Malagasy spoken by Antesaka people in the region of Atsimo Atsinanana, Madagascar.

== Classification ==
Antesaka is a dialect of Malagasy belonging to the Central-Eastern branch of the language. It is grouped alongside other dialects within this branch, including those of the Plateau Malagasy (such as Merina and Antefasy), the Southern Betsimisaraka dialect, and the Sahafatra dialect.

== Characteristics ==
Among the Central-Eastern Malagasy dialects, the Sahafatra dialect is considered the most closely related to Antesaka. The Antesaka dialect also exhibits notable similarities with the neighboring Antanosy dialect, largely due to their geographic proximity. These similarities include shared vocabulary and a common phonological feature: the suppression of the suffix -na or -gn, which is typically found in other Central-Eastern dialects. The use of the suffix -na or -gn is characteristic of most Central-Eastern Malagasy varieties, but it is notably absent in Antesaka, Sahafatra, and Southern Betsileo dialects.

== Geographical distribution ==
The Antesaka dialect is spoken across a broad area in southeastern Madagascar, from the southern part of the Farafangana District to the Fort-Dauphin District, and from the Iakora District in the west—historically associated with the Bara people—to the Indian Ocean in the east. This area corresponds to the districts of Befotaka Sud District, Midongy-Atsimo District, Vangaindrano District, and partially to Vondrozo District and Farafangana District.

== Vocabulary ==
Numerals
#	English	Malagasy Standard	Antesaka
1	One	Iray / Isa	Iraiky / Isa
2	Two	Roa	Roy
3	Three	Telo	Telo
4	Four	Efatra	Efatry
5	Five	Dimy	Dimy
6	Six	Enina	Eny
7	Seven	Fito	Fito
8	Eight	Valo	Valo
9	Nine	Sivy	Sivy
10	Ten	Folo	Folo
11	Hundred	Zato	Zato
12	Thousand	Arivo	Arivo
13	Ten thousand	Iray alina	Ray haly
14	One hundred thousand	Iray hetsy	Ray hetsy
15	One million	Tapitrisa	Tapitrisa

Animals
#	English	Malagasy Standard	Antesaka
1	Animal	Biby	Biby
2	Bird	Vorona	Voro
3	Duck	Ganagana	Gana
4	Chicken	Akoho	Akoho
5	Goose	Gisa	Gisy
6	Cow	Omby	Aomby
7	Sheep	Ondry	Ondry

Direction
#	English	Malagasy Standard	Antesaka
1	North	Avaratra	Avaratry
2	South	Atsimo	Atsimo
3	East	Atsinanana	Atsignana
4	West	Andrefana	Andrefa

Time
#	English	Malagasy Standard	Antesaka
1	Day	Andro	Andro
2	Today	Anio / Androany	Androany
3	Yesterday	Omaly	Omaly
4	Tomorrow	Rahampitso	Omaray
5	Month	Volana	Volagny
6	Year	Taona	Tao

== Bibliography ==
- Deschamps, Hubert (1952). Le dialecte Antaisaka (langue malgache). Paris: Société d'Éditions Géographiques, Maritimes et Coloniales.
