= Dolichostachys =

Conservation status
- Endangered (IUCN 3.1)

Scientific classification
- Kingdom: Plantae
- Clade: Tracheophytes
- Clade: Angiosperms
- Clade: Eudicots
- Clade: Asterids
- Order: Lamiales
- Family: Acanthaceae
- Genus: Dolichostachys; Benoist
- Species: D. elongata

Binomial name
- Dolichostachys elongata Benoist

Genus of flowering plants

Dolichostachys is a monotypic genus of plants in the family Acanthaceae. Its sole species, Dolichostachys elongata, is a subshrub that is endemic to Madagascar. It is considered an endangered species.

== Taxonomy and history ==
The genus Dolichostachys and species Dolichostachys elongata were named and described by Raymond Benoist in 1962 based on two specimens collected by Joseph Marie Henry Alfred Perrier de la Bâthie in 1912. However, as Benoist failed to designate a type specimen, neither the genus nor species names could be considered validly published under Article 40 of the International Code of Nomenclature for algae, fungi, and plants. Benoist's description was verified and a type specimen was designated in a 2022 article published in the journal Taxon, with the author citation attributed to Benoist.

D. elongata remains the sole species in the genus Dolichostachys. Morphologically, it resembles members of the genus Populina and its allies in the subtribe Tetrameriinae, but can be differentiated by the length of its flower, the broad upper lip of the flower, and its elongate leaves when mature. It is unplaced within the tribe Justicieae, possibly belonging to either subtribe Isoglossinae or subtribe Tetrameriinae.

== Distribution and habitat ==
Dolichostachys elongata is known only from the Analanjirofo and Atsimo-Atsinanana regions of Madagascar. In Analanjirofo it can be found near Mananara Nord and Fenerive Est, and in Atsimo-Atsinanana it can be found near Manombo. It grows near rivers in humid forests at elevations from sea level up to 200 m (660 ft) above sea level.

== Description ==
Dolichostachys elongata is an erect subshrub growing up to 1 m (3 ft 3 in) tall. The branches are quadrangular and slightly hairy. The leaves are linear to lanceolate and pointed at both the tip and the base, each measuring approximately 7–15 cm (2.8–5.9 in) long and 10–22 mm (0.39–0.87 in) wide. The leaves are hairless, arranged opposite one another, and borne on 10–18 mm (0.39–0.71 in) long petioles. The inflorescence is a bracteolate spike. The bracts are lanceolate, measuring approximately 4 mm (0.16 in) long and 1 mm (0.039 in) wide, while the bracteoles are linear and measure only 1 mm (0.039 in) long. Both the bracts and bracteoles are hairy. The five sepals are of roughly equal size, pointed in shape, and hairy. The corolla is a short, fused tube, with the tube measuring approximately 4.5 mm (0.18 in) long and the corolla as a whole measuring 10 mm (0.39 in) long. The upper lip of the corolla is shaped like a broad oval with a rounded or slightly notched tip, while the lower lip of the corolla is split into three lobes.

== Conservation ==
Dolichostachys elongata is listed as endangered by the International Union for the Conservation of Nature under criteria B1ab(i,ii,iii,iv) and B2ab(i,ii,iii,iv), based on its small extent and area of occupancy and the expected decline of its population and habitat. It is primarily threatened by habitat loss resulting from logging, slash and burn agriculture, and other forms of deforestation. Some plants can be found within the Manombo Special Reserve, however, plants outside of this protected area are particularly threatened by habitat degradation, and the species is not known to be conserved ex situ.
