= Sahafatra dialect =

Austronesian language of Madagascar

Sahafatra
- Native to: Madagascar
- Ethnicity: Sahafatra
- Native speakers: 129,000
- Language family: Austronesian: Malayo-Polynesian; Western Indonesian; Barito; East Barito; Central-Eastern Malagasic; Sahafatra
- Writing system: Latin script (Malagasy alphabet)

Language codes
- ISO 639-3: –
- Linguasphere: 31-LDA-ai
- Sahafatra language sample Sahafatra chief speaking in Sahafatra dialect contesting legislative election results in the district of Vondrozo

Sahafatra is a dialect of Malagasy spoken by Sahafatra people in North West Atsimo Atsinanana.

== Classification ==
Sahafatra is an Austronesian language part of the Central-Eastern Malagasic branch of Malagasy.

== Geographical distribution ==
The Sahafatra is a dialect from the district of Vondrozo.

== Characteristics ==
Sahafatra shares several common features mostly with Antesaka and lightly to Antefasy. Sahafatra has very weak Bara influence.

== Vocabulary ==
Sahafatra gloss
#	Gloss	Malagasy standard	Sahafatra
Pronouns & People
1	One	Isa / Iray	Isa / Raiky
2	I	Izaho / Aho	Iaho / Aho
3	You	Ianao / Ianareo	Anareo
4	He / She	Izy	Izy
5	Him	Azy	Anazy
6	We	Izahay	Ahay
7	They	Zareo	Ireo
8	Us	Anay / Isika	Anay / Atsika
Function Words & Places
9	The	Ny	E / Gne
10	Again	Indray	Lehitany
11	Here	Eto	Tretoa
12	In	Any / Tany	Te
13	Month	Volana	Vola
14	State	Fanjakana	Fanjakà
Qualities & Emotions
15	Dark	Maizina	Mezy
16	Shame	Baraka	Baraky
17	Fear	Tahotra	Tahatry
18	To be scared	Matahotra	Matahatry
Actions & Phrases
19	To go to an elevated area	Miakatra	Makatry
20	We go to Antananarivo	Miakatra any Antananarivo izahay	Makatry Antananarivo Aahay
21	He was in Belgium	Tany Belzika izy teo	Te Belgiky izy teo
22	The authority arrested him	Nosamborin'ny Fanjakana izy	Sinambotry e fanjakà izy
23	Tie the cow	Fatory ny omby	Fihezo gne aomby
24	That's it	Izany lay izy	Ezany izy io
