= Anosivelo =

Anosivelo Nosivelo
- Location in Madagascar
- Coordinates: 22°44′S 47°46′E
- Country: Madagascar
- Region: Atsimo-Atsinanana
- District: Farafangana

Area
  - Total: 150 km^{2} (58 sq mi)
- Elevation: 6 m (20 ft)

Population (2001)
  - Total: 17,000
- Time zone: UTC3 (EAT)
- Postal code: 309

Anosivelo is a rural municipality in Madagascar. It belongs to the district of Farafangana, which is a part of Atsimo-Atsinanana Region. The population of the commune was estimated to be approximately 17,000 in 2001 commune census.

Primary and junior level secondary education are available in town. The majority 95% of the population of the commune are farmers. The most important crops are rice and coffee, while other important agricultural products are lychee and cassava. Services provide employment for 5% of the population.

== Geography ==
The town is situated at 12 km North from Farafangana along the National road 12.

It is situated at the Manampatrana River.

== Fokontany ==
It covers 9 fokontany (villages)

- Ambalavotaka
- Anakatrika
- Agnapoaka
- Anosivelo
- Fierena
- Ibakaka
- Lokandambo
- Manambotra Nord
- Marolava
