= Bara dialect =

Austronesian language of Madagascar

Bara
- Native to: Madagascar
- Ethnicity: Bara people
- Language family: Austronesian: Malayo-Polynesian; Western Indonesian; Barito; East Barito; Southern Malagasic; Bara
- Writing system: Latin script (Malagasy alphabet)

Language codes
- ISO 639-3: bhr
- Glottolog: bara1369
- Linguasphere: 31-LDA-cg
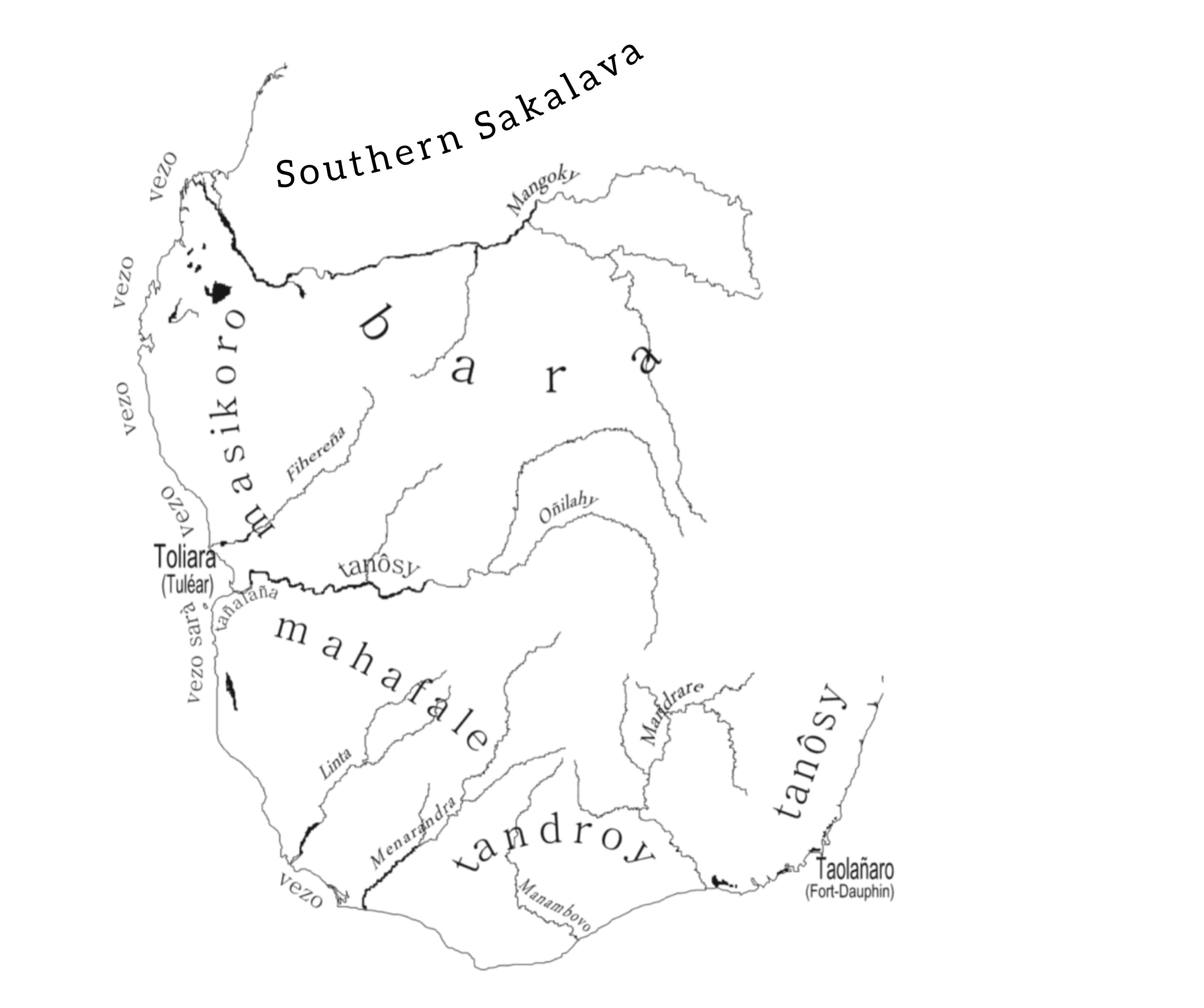
- Map showing the Southern Malagasic dialect group, including Bara
- Bara dialect – Ivohibe A man from Ivohibe speaks in the Bara dialect, requesting help from authorities after an encounter with Dahalo (cattle thieves) . Bara dialect – Beroroha A man in Beroroha recounts, in the Bara dialect, his injuries and escape after a Dahalo attack.

Bara is a dialect of Malagasy spoken by Bara people in Central and Southern Madagascar. It is a Southern Malagasy dialect.

== Classification ==
Bara dialect belongs to the Austronesian language family and part of Southern malagasic subgroup alongside Southern Sakalava, Tandroy, Tanosy and Vezo.

== Geographic distribution ==
The Bara dialect is predominantly spoken in the Ihorombe region, where it serves as the primary means of communication. It is particularly popular in the city of Ihosy. The dialect is also spoken in parts of the Menabe region, in the western areas of Atsimo-Atsinanana, in a very limited portion of southern Vakinankaratra, as well as in the Anosy region—especially in the Betroka District—and in the Atsimo-Andrefana region, notably in the Beroroha District.

== Characteristics ==
The Bara dialect displays several phonological and lexical characteristics that distinguish it from the Merina-based Standard Malagasy. These features are also shared with other southern Malagasy dialects such as Tandroy, Tanosy, Vezo, Mahafaly, and Southern Sakalava.

One notable feature is the dropping of the final -na in trisyllabic words. For example, tana is used instead of tànana (hand), tanà for tanàna (village), sofy for sofina (ear), and antety for antanety (field), the latter also common in Southern Sakalava.

There is also a tendency to substitute l for d, as in valy for vady (spouse), dily for didy (law, order), and malio for madio (clean). However, in some cases where Standard Malagasy uses l, the Bara dialect reintroduces d, as in kedikedy (Bara), while southeastern dialects use kidikidy.

The s following a t is often omitted, producing forms like raty instead of ratsy (bad).

The consonant v may be replaced by b, for example, abo for avo (high).

The consonant z is frequently dropped. Aiza (where) becomes aia, and izahay (we) becomes ahay. The pronoun izy (he/she) becomes ihy, a form typical of southern dialects such as Mahafaly, Vezo, and Southern Sakalava. Likewise, izaho (I) becomes iaho, which the Bara dialect shares with some central-eastern Malagasy dialects such as Sahafatra and Antefasy.

Words ending in -tra often become -tsy, a pattern consistent with southern Malagasy varieties.

The form anakahy is used for "mine", a feature found in both northern and southern Malagasy dialects.

The verb manelo, meaning "to ache" or "to throb", is used in Bara, while the form mañelo is found in southeastern Malagasy dialects.

For "to sit," Bara uses the verb midoboka, whereas southeastern dialects use midoboky.

== Vocabulary ==
Andro amin'gny fivola Bara (Days in the Bara language)
#	Bara	Gloss
1	Tinainy	Monday
2	Talata	Tuesday
3	Alarobia	Wednesday
4	Kamisy	Thursday
5	Zoma	Friday
6	Sabotsy	Saturday
7	Lahady	Sunday

Numbers
#	Bara	Standard Malagasy	Gloss
1	Raiky	Iray	One
2	Roy	Roa	Two

Pronouns
#	Bara	Standard Malagasy	Gloss
1	Iahay	Izahay	We
2	Anao / Anareo	Ianao / Ianareo	You
3	Tagnaminy / Ihy	Aminy / Taminy / Izy	Him / Her

Family & People
#	Bara	Standard Malagasy	Gloss
1	Olo	Olona	Person / People / Human
2	Anaky	Zanaka	Child / Son / Daughter
3	Ampela	Vehivavy	Woman / Girl
4	Valy	Vady	Wife / Spouse
5	Reny	Endry	Mother
6	Zavavy	Zapela	Young girl

Function Words & Connectors
#	Bara	Standard Malagasy	Gloss
1	Laha	Raha	If
2	Fe	Fa	But / That
3	Akoa	Ohatra / Tahaka	Like / As
4	Gny	Ny	The
5	Anany zao	Izao	Now
6	Nahoa	Nahoana	Why
7	Akôry	Ahoana	How
8	Oviana	Ombia	When
9	Aiza	Aia	Where

Actions & Verbs
#	Bara	Standard Malagasy	Gloss
1	Mandigny	Miandry	To wait
2	Mikaiky	Miantso	To call
3	Magnefa	Mandoa	To pay
4	Tiako	Tiako	I love
5	Avily	Amidy	For sale
6	Totondry	Komondro	To punch
7	Miandry	Liny	To wait

Qualities & Conditions
#	Bara	Standard Malagasy	Gloss
1	Malio	Madio	Clean
2	Kanda	Momba	Sterile / Barren
3	Atitsy	Antitra	Old (person)
4	Ravo	Faly	Happy
5	Mosare	Noana	Hungry
6	Lena	Le	Wet
7	Maina	Maika	Dry
8	Mariny	Akaiky	Near

Physical World & Places
#	Bara	Standard Malagasy	Gloss
1	Làla	Làlana	Way / Road
2	Itsy	Mahitsy	Straight
3	Ambaliky	Ambadika	Behind / Outside
4	Toly	Vita	Over / Finished
5	Lily	Lalàna	Law
6	Avy	Boaky	From

Abstract Concepts & Spiritual
#	Bara	Standard Malagasy	Gloss
1	Aota	Fahotana	Sin
2	Fiegna	Fiainana	Life
3	Masina	Masina	Holy
4	Fagnahy	Fanahy	Soul / Spirit
5	Ibilitsy	Anjely	Angel
6	Aina	Ay	Life (spiritual/living being)

Natural World & Living Beings
#	Bara	Standard Malagasy	Gloss
1	Aondry	Ondry	Sheep
2	Taola	Taolana	Bone
3	Balahazo	Mangahazo	Cassava
4	Gidro	Sifaky	Lemur

Objects & Material Culture
#	Bara	Standard Malagasy	Gloss
1	Kiviro	Kavina	Earrings
2	Taly	Tady	Rope
3	Antsy	Mesa	Knife

Geography & Matter
#	Bara	Standard Malagasy	Gloss
1	Sand	Fasika / Fasy	Sand

Time & Calendar
#	Bara	Standard Malagasy	Gloss
1	Taona	Tao	Year

Government & Society
#	Bara	Standard Malagasy	Gloss
1	Fanjakana	Fanjaka	State / Kingdom / Government
