= Mahavelo, Farafangana =

Mahavelo
- Location in Madagascar
- Coordinates: 22°42′S 47°42′E
- Country: Madagascar
- Region: Atsimo-Atsinanana
- District: Farafangana
- Elevation: 13 m (43 ft)

Population (2001)
  - Total: 8,000
- Time zone: UTC3 (EAT)

Mahavelo is a town and commune in Madagascar. It belongs to the district of Farafangana, which is a part of Atsimo-Atsinanana Region. The population of the commune was estimated to be approximately 8,000 in 2001 commune census.

Only primary schooling is available. The majority 98% of the population of the commune are farmers. The most important crop is rice, while other important products are bananas, coffee and cassava. Services provide employment for 1.5% of the population. Additionally fishing employs 0.5% of the population.

== Geography ==
Mahavelo lies on the Manampatrana River.
