= Anosy Tsararafa =

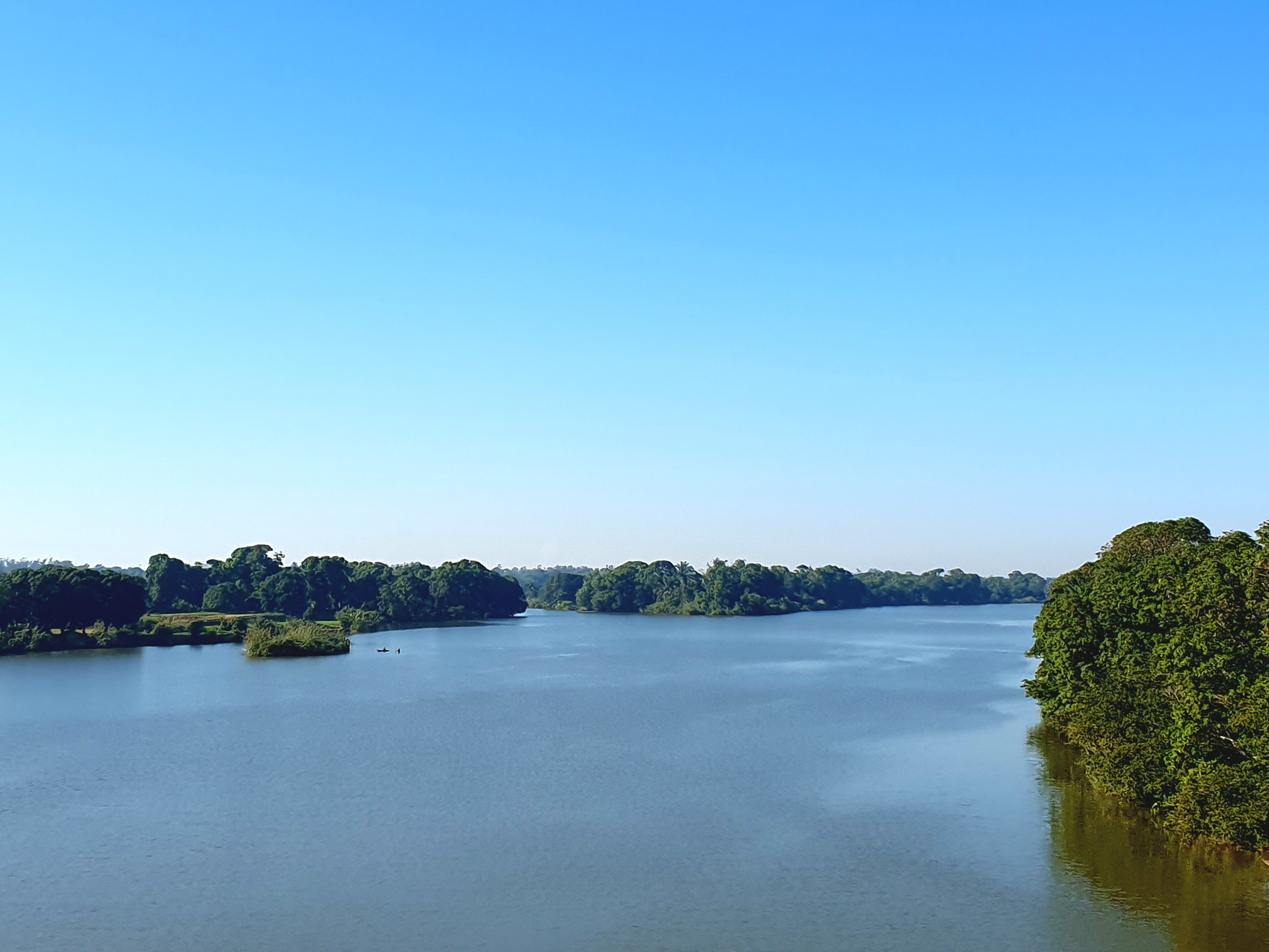
- Manampatrana River at Anosy Tsararafa

- Location in Madagascar
- Coordinates: 22°44′S 47°49′E
- Country: Madagascar
- Region: Atsimo-Atsinanana
- District: Farafangana
- Elevation: 10 m (33 ft)

Population (2001)
  - Total: 20,000
- Time zone: UTC3 (EAT)
- Postal code: 309

Anosy Tsararafa is a rural municipality in Madagascar. It belongs to the district of Farafangana, which is a part of Atsimo-Atsinanana Region. The population of the commune was estimated to be approximately 20,000 in 2001 commune census.

Primary and junior level secondary education are available in town. The majority 94.5% of the population of the commune are farmers, while an additional 4% receives their livelihood from raising livestock. The most important crops are rice and lychee, while other important agricultural products are coffee and cassava. Services provide employment for 0.5% of the population. Additionally fishing employs 1% of the population.

== Geography ==
Anosy Tsararafa is situated at the crossing of the National road 12 over the Manampatrana River, north of Farafangana.
