= Sahafatra =

Ethnic group in Madagascar

Safatra

Total population
- 129,000

Regions with significant populations
- Madagascar

Languages
- Sahafatra

Religion
- Traditional beliefs Christianity

The Sahafatra, also known as Safatra, are an ethnic group of Madagascar inhabiting the mountainous part of Atsimo Atsinanana region.

== Location ==
The Sahafatra are found mostly in the district of Vondrozo.

== Recognition ==
The Sahafatra like the Masikoro, Mikea and the Vorimo are not included in the 18 officially recognized tribes of Madagascar despite being a full-fledged ethnic group. They are considered as part of Tanala, Antesaka or Bara.

== History ==
A letter from De Faye in 1668 mentioned the Sahafatra in a conflict between them and the Antesaka.

Sahafatra was one of the malagasy tribes independent from Hova rule

They took part in the 1904-1905 revolt against French colonists.

== Bibliography ==
- Earth‑Shakers of Sahafatra: A Study of the People and Land of Sahafatra, Southeast Madagascar. CORE. PDF. Accessed 28 June 2025.
