= Mahabo Mananivo =

Coordinates: 23°11′S 47°41′E

- Interactive map of Mahabo Mananivo
- Country: Madagascar
- Region: Atsimo-Atsinanana
- District: Farafangana

Population (2001)
  - Total: 10,000
- Time zone: UTC3 (EAT)

Mahabo Mananivo is a town and commune in Madagascar. It belongs to the district of Farafangana, which is a part of Atsimo-Atsinanana Region. The population of the commune was estimated to be approximately 10,000 in 2001 commune census.

Primary and junior level secondary education are available in town. 98% of the population of the commune are farmers. The most important crops are rice and coffee, while other locally important agricultural products are cloves and pepper. Services provide employment for 1% of the population. Additionally, fishing employs 1% of the population.
