= Vohilengo, Farafangana =

Vohilengo
- Location in Madagascar
- Coordinates: 22°32′S 47°41′E
- Country: Madagascar
- Region: Atsimo-Atsinanana
- District: Farafangana
- Elevation: 17 m (56 ft)

Population (2001)
  - Total: 16,000
- Time zone: UTC3 (EAT)

Vohilengo is a town and commune in Madagascar. It belongs to the district of Farafangana, which is a part of Atsimo-Atsinanana Region. The population of the commune was estimated to be approximately 16,000 in 2001 commune census.

Only primary schooling is available. The majority 98.5% of the population of the commune are farmers. The most important crops are coffee and bananas, while other important agricultural products are cassava, pepper and rice. Services provide employment for 0.5% of the population. Additionally fishing employs 1% of the population.
