= Etrotroka Sud =

- Location in Madagascar
- Coordinates: 22°53′S 47°36′E
- Country: Madagascar
- Region: Atsimo-Atsinanana
- District: Farafangana
- Elevation: 22 m (72 ft)

Population (2001)
  - Total: 17,000
- Time zone: UTC3 (EAT)

Etrotroka Sud is a town and commune in Madagascar. It belongs to the district of Farafangana, which is a part of Atsimo-Atsinanana Region. The population of the commune was estimated to be approximately 17,000 in 2001 commune census.

Primary and junior level secondary education are available in town. The majority 90% of the population of the commune are farmers, while an additional 2% receives their livelihood from raising livestock. The most important crops are rice and coffee, while other important agricultural products are cassava and pepper. Services provide employment for 8% of the population.
