= Tovona =

- Location in Madagascar
- Coordinates: 22°55′S 47°38′E
- Country: Madagascar
- Region: Atsimo-Atsinanana
- District: Farafangana
- Elevation: 28 m (92 ft)

Population (2001)
  - Total: 7,000
- Time zone: UTC3 (EAT)

Tovona is a town and commune in Madagascar. It belongs to the district of Farafangana, which is a part of Atsimo-Atsinanana Region. The population of the commune was estimated to be approximately 7,000 in 2001 commune census.

Only primary schooling is available. 97.9% of the population of the commune are farmers, while an additional two percent receive their livelihood from raising livestock. The most important crop is rice. Other important products are coffee and cassava. Services provide employment for 0.1% of the population.
