= Fenoarivo, Farafangana =

Fenoarivo
- Location in Madagascar
- Coordinates: 23°7′S 47°34′E
- Country: Madagascar
- Region: Atsimo-Atsinanana
- District: Farafangana
- Elevation: 24 m (79 ft)

Population (2001)
  - Total: 16,000
- Time zone: UTC3 (EAT)

Fenoarivo is a town and commune in Madagascar. It belongs to the district of Farafangana, which is a part of Atsimo-Atsinanana Region. The population of the commune was estimated to be approximately 16,000 in 2001 commune census.

Only primary schooling is available. The majority 94.5% of the population of the commune are farmers, while an additional 5% receives their livelihood from raising livestock. The most important crop is coffee, while other important products are cassava, pepper and rice. Services provide employment for 0.5% of the population.
