= Marovandrika =

- Location in Madagascar
- Coordinates: 22°31′S 47°40′E
- Country: Madagascar
- Region: Atsimo-Atsinanana
- District: Farafangana
- Elevation: 17 m (56 ft)

Population (2001)
  - Total: 13,000
- Time zone: UTC3 (EAT)

Marovandrika is a town and commune in Madagascar. It belongs to the district of Farafangana, which is a part of Atsimo-Atsinanana Region. The population of the commune was estimated to be approximately 13,000 in 2001 commune census.

Primary and junior level secondary education are available in town. The majority 99.9% of the population of the commune are farmers. The most important crops are rice and coffee, while other important agricultural products are pineapple and bananas. Services provide employment for 0.1% of the population.
