= Ambalavato =

- Location in Madagascar
- Coordinates: 22°58′S 47°28′E
- Country: Madagascar
- Region: Atsimo-Atsinanana
- District: Farafangana
- Elevation: 98 m (322 ft)

Population (2001)
  - Total: 21,000
- Time zone: UTC3 (EAT)

Ambalavato is a town and commune in Madagascar. It belongs to the district of Farafangana, which is a part of Atsimo-Atsinanana Region. The population of the commune was estimated to be approximately 21,000 in 2001 commune census.

Only primary schooling is available. The vast majority (99.9%, according to census data) of the population of the commune are farmers. The most important crops are rice and coffee, while other important agricultural products are bananas and cassava. Services provide employment for 0.1% of the population.
