= Ankarana Miraihina =

- Location in Madagascar
- Coordinates: 23°5′S 47°38′E
- Country: Madagascar
- Region: Atsimo-Atsinanana
- District: Farafangana
- Elevation: 66 m (217 ft)

Population (2001)
  - Total: 9,000
- Time zone: UTC3 (EAT)

Ankarana Miraihina is a town and commune in Madagascar. It belongs to the district of Farafangana, which is a part of Atsimo-Atsinanana Region. The population of the commune was estimated to be approximately 9,000 in 2001 commune census.

Primary and junior level secondary education are available in town. The majority 90% of the population of the commune are farmers, while an additional 7.9% receives their livelihood from raising livestock. The most important crop is rice, while other important products are coffee, cassava and pepper. Services provide employment for 2% of the population. Additionally fishing employs 0.1% of the population.
