= Ihorombe, Farafangana =

Ihorombe
- Location in Madagascar
- Coordinates: 23°0′S 47°32′E
- Country: Madagascar
- Region: Atsimo-Atsinanana
- District: Farafangana
- Elevation: 67 m (220 ft)

Population (2001)
  - Total: 13,000
- Time zone: UTC3 (EAT)

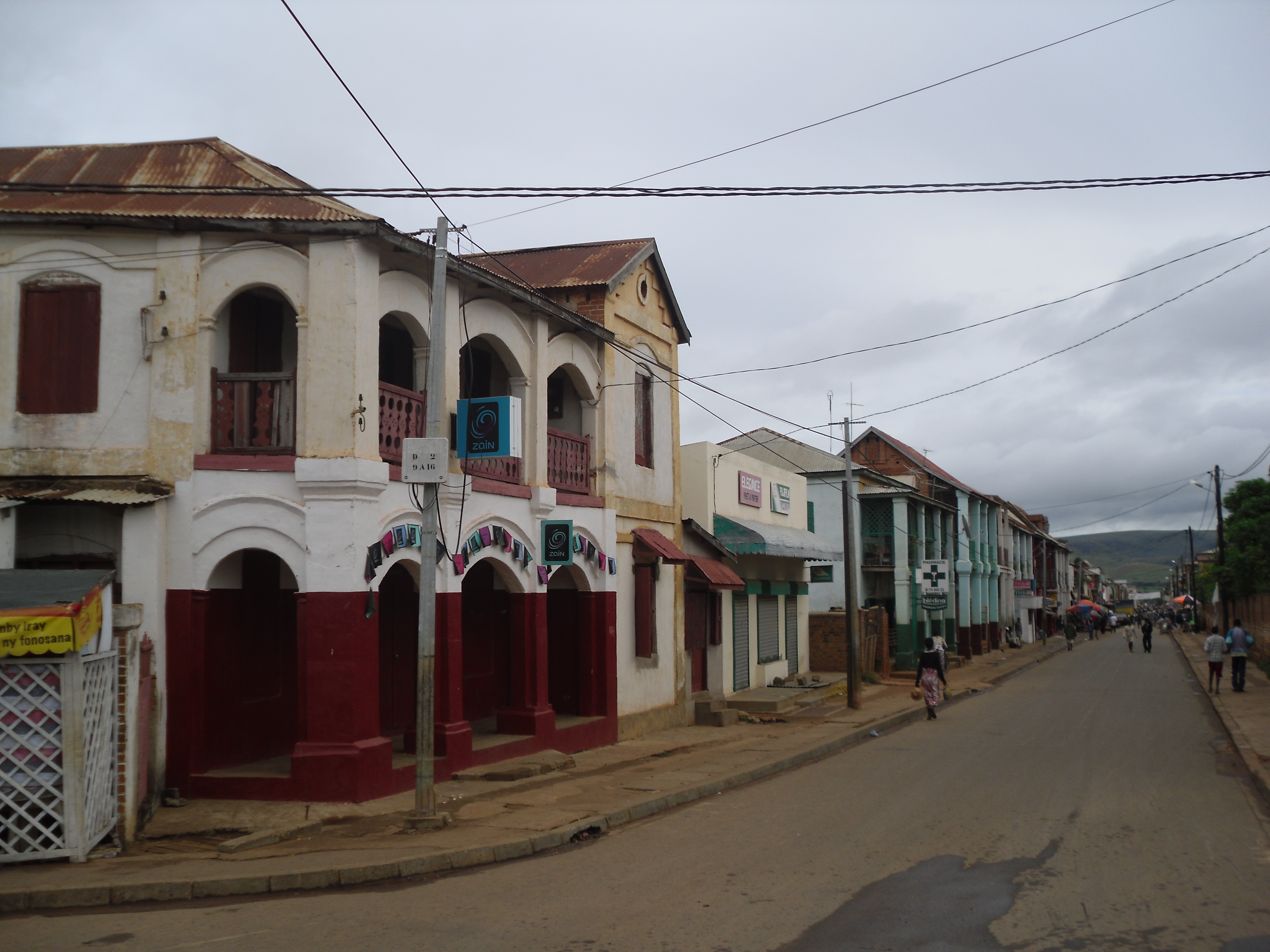

Ihorombe is a town and commune in Madagascar. It belongs to the district of Farafangana, which is a part of Atsimo-Atsinanana Region; it is not located in the Ihorombe region. The population of the commune was estimated to be approximately 13,000 in 2001 commune census.

Primary and junior level secondary education are available in town. The majority 90% of the population of the commune are farmers, while an additional 9.6% receives their livelihood from raising livestock. The most important crops are rice and coffee, while other important agricultural products are sugarcane, cassava and pepper. Services provide employment for 0.4% of the population.
