= Tata Max =

Malagasy pastor and nationalist leader

Personal details
- Born: Tata Maxime; 1907 Farafangana, French Madagascar
- Died: October 10, 1983 (aged 75–76) Antananarivo, Madagascar
- Party: MDRM
- Spouse: Rasoarimanga Hélène
- Children: 5
- Occupation: Pastor, politician

Pastor Tata Max (1907 – 10 October 1983), born Tata Maxime, was a Malagasy Protestant pastor and nationalist figure. He played a key role in the Democratic Movement for Malagasy Rejuvenation (MDRM) and was imprisoned and exiled for his involvement in the Malagasy Uprising of 1947.

== Early life and education ==
Tata Maxime was born in 1907 in Farafangana, in southeastern Madagascar. He attended the Regional School (École Régionale) in Farafangana, but was expelled for leading fellow students in a protest against the French director’s demand to plant cassava as pig feed.

He left Farafangana on foot and walked all the way to Toamasina, where he worked as a docker at the port. During this time, he pursued self-education with the support of his fellow dockers and developed a close friendship with Pastor Rakotovao Antoine, a theology instructor with the London Missionary Society (LMS).

== Religious career ==
In 1932, he enrolled in theology studies after feeling a strong spiritual calling. He continued his theological training at the LMS Theological College in Ambohipotsy, Antananarivo, and was ordained as a pastor on 26 December 1936.

In 1937, he married Rasoarimanga Hélène, daughter of Rainizanamoria, a deacon at the LMS Church in Ambondrona, Antananarivo.

He served as pastor in several congregations, including in the Mananjary–Mahitsy region and later at the LMS Church in Morarano-Gare, near Moramanga.

== Political involvement ==
In 1945, Tata Max joined the Ravoahangy Committee, a support organization backing Dr. Joseph Ravoahangy Andrianavalona in his candidacy for the French Constituent Assembly. He ran against Pastor Ravelojaona.

In 1946, he became one of the founding members of the political party Mouvement Démocratique de la Rénovation Malgache (MDRM). He was a member of its Central Political Bureau and served as organizer and coordinator for MDRM activities in the southeastern regions and Toamasina.

In 1947, he was elected to the Provincial Assembly under the MDRM list for the province of Tamatave.

During an MDRM meeting in Vatomandry in March 1947, Tata Max called for Malagasy unity across all 18 tribes to achieve independence. He said he was Antaifasy but still received votes from the Hova (Merina). He rejected Merina domination after independence and condemned supporters of the pro-colonial PADESM party as betrayers of their race. He warned Merina leaders against trying to seize power after independence.

== Arrest and exile ==
On Sunday, 30 March 1947, Pastor Tata Max was arrested at the Morarano Gare church during a service, in front of his catechumens and family for allegedly backing the Malagasy Uprising. On 4 October 1948, he was sentenced to death along with Dr. Ravoahangy, Dr. Raseta, Rakotovao Martin, Rakotoarisaonina Augustin, and Joel Sylvain which later substituted into an exile.

In 1949, he was imprisoned on the island of Mohéli in the Comoros, and in 1950, he was deported for life to Calvi, Corsica, in France.

== Return and later years ==
Following Madagascar’s independence, he was granted amnesty by the newly established Republic of Madagascar in 1960 and was repatriated.

He did not return to pastoral ministry but served instead as Chief of Staff (Directeur de Cabinet) to Minister Jacques Rabemananjara until 1972.

Pastor Tata Max died on 10 October 1983. He is buried in Farafangana.

== Legacy ==
In 2013, the Lycée d’Enseignement Général de Farafangana was officially renamed Lycée Tata Max to commemorate and honor him.

== See also ==
- Samuel Rakotondrabe
