= Evato =

- Location in Madagascar
- Coordinates: 22°36′S 47°41′E
- Country: Madagascar
- Region: Atsimo-Atsinanana
- District: Farafangana

Area
  - Total: 82 km^{2} (32 sq mi)
- Elevation: 13 m (43 ft)

Population (2001)
  - Total: 13,000
  - Density: 263/km^{2} (680/sq mi)
- Time zone: UTC3 (EAT)
- Postal code: 309

Evato is a rural municipality in Madagascar. It belongs to the district of Farafangana, which is a part of Atsimo-Atsinanana Region. The population of the commune was estimated to be approximately 13,000 in 2001 commune census.

Primary and junior level secondary education are available in town. The majority 95% of the population of the commune are farmers. The most important crops are rice and bananas; also coffee is an important agricultural product. Services provide employment for 4% of the population. Additionally fishing employs 1% of the population.
