= Mahafasa Centre =

- Location in Madagascar
- Coordinates: 22°40′S 47°39′E
- Country: Madagascar
- Region: Atsimo-Atsinanana
- District: Farafangana
- Elevation: 15 m (49 ft)

Population (2001)
  - Total: 89,000
- Time zone: UTC3 (EAT)

Mahafasa Centre is a rural municipality in Madagascar. It belongs to the district of Farafangana, which is a part of Atsimo-Atsinanana Region. The population of the commune was estimated to be approximately 89,000 in 2001 commune census.

Primary and junior level secondary education are available in town. The majority 97% of the population of the commune are farmers. The most important crops are rice and coffee, while other important agricultural products are cassava and pepper. Services provide employment for 0.5% of the population. Additionally fishing employs 2.5% of the population.

== Roads ==
There is an unpaved rural piste of 25.2 km between Mahafasa Centre, Namohora Iaborano, and Ambalatany.
