= Manambotra Sud =

- Location in Madagascar
- Coordinates: 22°55′S 47°49′E
- Country: Madagascar
- Region: Atsimo-Atsinanana
- District: Farafangana
- Elevation: 8 m (26 ft)

Population (2001)
  - Total: 5,000
- Time zone: UTC3 (EAT)

Manambotra Sud (Manambotra Atsimo) is a town and commune in Madagascar. It belongs to the district of Farafangana, which is a part of Atsimo-Atsinanana Region. The population of the commune was estimated to be approximately 5,000 in 2001 commune census.

Only primary schooling is available. The majority 94.9% of the population of the commune are farmers, while an additional 4% receives their livelihood from raising livestock. The most important crop is cassava, while other important products are coffee, pepper and rice. Services provide employment for 0.1% of the population. Additionally fishing employs 1% of the population.
