= Vohimasy, Farafangana =

Vohimasy
- Location in Madagascar
- Coordinates: 22°49′S 47°45′E
- Country: Madagascar
- Region: Atsimo-Atsinanana
- District: Farafangana
- Elevation: 14 m (46 ft)

Population (2001)
  - Total: 5,000
- Time zone: UTC3 (EAT)

Vohimasy is a town and commune in Madagascar. It belongs to the district of Farafangana, which is a part of Atsimo-Atsinanana Region. The population of the commune was estimated to be approximately 5,000 in 2001 commune census.

Only primary schooling is available. The majority 91% of the population of the commune are farmers, while an additional 8% receives their livelihood from raising livestock. The most important crop is rice, while other important products are coffee, cassava and pepper. Services provide employment for 1% of the population.
