= Ivandrika =

- Location in Madagascar
- Coordinates: 22°52′S 47°44′E
- Country: Madagascar
- Region: Atsimo-Atsinanana
- District: Farafangana
- Elevation: 8 m (26 ft)

Population (2001)
  - Total: 9,000
- Time zone: UTC3 (EAT)

Ivandrika is a town and commune in Madagascar. It belongs to the district of Farafangana, which is a part of Atsimo-Atsinanana Region. The population of the commune was estimated to be approximately 9,000 in 2001 commune census.

Only primary schooling is available. The majority 98% of the population of the commune are farmers, while an additional 1% receives their livelihood from raising livestock. The most important crops are rice and coffee, while other important agricultural products are sugarcane, cassava and pepper. Services provide employment for 1% of the population.
