= Ambalatany =

- Location in Madagascar
- Coordinates: 22°32′S 47°36′E
- Country: Madagascar
- Region: Atsimo-Atsinanana
- District: Farafangana
- Elevation: 36 m (118 ft)

Population (2001)
  - Total: 16,000
- Time zone: UTC3 (EAT)
- Postal code: 309

Ambalatany is a rural municipality in Madagascar. It belongs to the district of Farafangana, which is a part of Atsimo-Atsinanana Region. The population of the commune was estimated to be approximately 16,000 in 2001 commune census.

Primary and junior level secondary education are available in town. The majority (99.9%) of the population of the commune are farmers. The most important crops are rice and bananas; with coffee as another important agricultural product. Services provide employment for 0.1% of the population.

== Roads ==
There is an unpaved rural piste of 25.2 km between Mahafasa Centre, Namohora Iaborano and Ambalatany.
