= 2020 Farafangana prison break =

Jailbreak

Farafangana prison break
- Location: Farafangana, Madagascar
- Date: 23 August 2020
- Target: Farafangana prison
- Attack type: Prison break
- Deaths: 22
- Injuries: 8

On 23 August 2020, 88 prisoners escaped from a prison in the south-east coast of Madagascar. Prison guards shot and killed 22 inmates during the escape. 31 managed to escape, and as of 25 August 2020, one has been found dead and 11 have been caught.

Johnny Richard Andriamahefarivo (Minister of Justice) and Gisèle Ranampy (Minister of Labor) arrived in Farafangana on 25 August 2020 to investigate the situation.

== Response ==
Amnesty International called the killing of 22 detainees "an appalling attack on the right to life" and asked the authorities to investigate the prison guards of the use of "unnecessary lethal force".

== See also ==
- List of prison escapes
