= Amporoforo =

- Location in Madagascar
- Coordinates: 22°28′S 47°48′E
- Country: Madagascar
- Region: Atsimo-Atsinanana
- District: Farafangana
- Elevation: 20 m (66 ft)

Population (2001)
  - Total: 11,000
- Time zone: UTC3 (EAT)

Amporoforo is a town and commune in Madagascar. It belongs to the district of Farafangana, which is a part of Atsimo-Atsinanana Region. The population of the commune was estimated to be approximately 11,000 in 2001 commune census.

Primary and junior level secondary education are available in town. The majority 99.9% of the population of the commune are farmers. The most important crops are rice and cassava, while other important agricultural products are pineapple and sugarcane. Services provide employment for 0.1% of the population.
