= Farafangana District =

Farafangana
- City & district
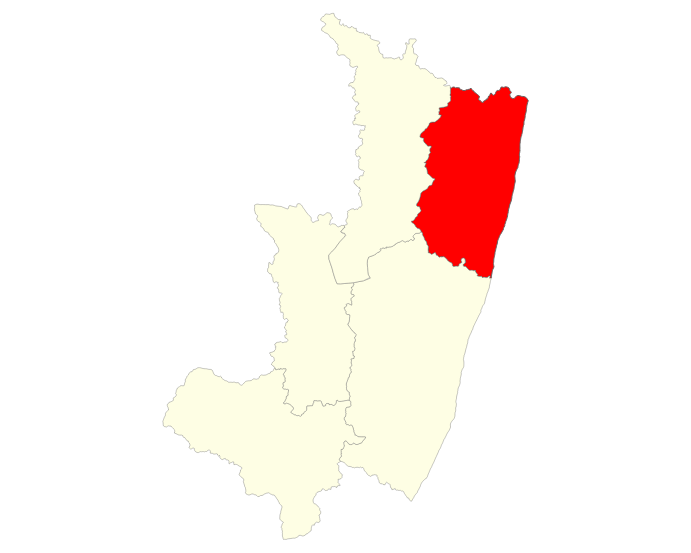
- Location of Farafangana
- Interactive map of Farafangana
- Coordinates: 22.8015°S 47.59827°E
- Country: Madagascar
- Region: Atsimo-Atsinanana

Area
  - Total: 2,824 km^{2} (1,090 sq mi)
- Elevation: 1 m (3.3 ft)

Population (2020)
  - Total: 436,226
  - Density: 154.5/km^{2} (400.1/sq mi)
- Time zone: UTC+3 (EAT)
- postal code: 309
- Climate: Af
- Website: www.farafangana.com

Farafangana is a district of Atsimo-Atsinanana in Madagascar. The district has an area of 2,824 km^{2} (1,090 sq mi), and the estimated population in 2020 was 436,226.

== Communes ==
The district is further divided into 30 communes:

- Ambalatany
- Ambalavato
- Ambohigogo
- Ambohimandroso
- Amporoforo
- Ankarana Miraihina
- Anosivelo
- Anosy Tsararafa
- Antsiranambe
- Beretra Bevoay
- Efatsy Anandroza
- Etrotroka Atsimo
- Evato
- Farafangana
- Fenoarivo
- Iabohazo
- Ihorombe
- Ivandrika
- Mahabo Mananivo
- Mahafasa Afovoany
- Mahavelo
- Maheriraty
- Manambotra Atsimo
- Marovandrika
- Sahamadio
- Tangainony
- Tovona
- Vohilengo
- Vohimasy
- Vohitromby

== Economy ==
There is an airport in Farafangana (Farafangana Airport). One of the main crops in the region is pepper.

== Population ==
Natives are mainly from ethnic groups Antefasy, Rabakara, Antesaka and Zafisoro.

== Education ==
Farafangana has a university.

== Tourism ==
The Manombo Reserve is located at 25 km to Farafangana.

== See also ==
- Diocese of Farafangana
- Manombo Reserve
