= Efatsy Anandroza =

- Location in Madagascar
- Coordinates: 23°7′S 47°36′E
- Country: Madagascar
- Region: Atsimo-Atsinanana
- District: Farafangana
- Elevation: 14 m (46 ft)

Population (2001)
  - Total: 11,000
- Time zone: UTC3 (EAT)

Efatsy Anandroza is a town and commune in Madagascar. It belongs to the district of Farafangana, which is a part of Atsimo-Atsinanana Region. The population of the commune was estimated to be approximately 11,000 in 2001 commune census.

Only primary schooling is available. The majority 81% of the population of the commune are farmers, while an additional 8% receives their livelihood from raising livestock. The most important crops are rice and coffee, while other important agricultural products are cassava and pepper. Services provide employment for 10% of the population. Additionally fishing employs 1% of the population.
