= Vohitromby =

- Location in Madagascar
- Coordinates: 22°52′S 47°46′E
- Country: Madagascar
- Region: Atsimo-Atsinanana
- District: Farafangana
- Elevation: 4 m (13 ft)

Population (2001)
  - Total: 5,000
- Time zone: UTC3 (EAT)

Vohitromby is a town and commune in Madagascar. It belongs to the district of Farafangana, which is a part of Atsimo-Atsinanana Region. The population of the commune was estimated to be approximately 5,000 in 2001 commune census.

Primary and junior level secondary education are available in town. The majority 99% of the population of the commune are farmers, while an additional 0.5% receives their livelihood from raising livestock. The most important crops are rice and coffee, while other important agricultural products are cassava, sweet potatoes, pepper and vanilla. Services provide employment for 0.5% of the population.
