= Beretra Bevoay =

- Location in Madagascar
- Coordinates: 22°43′S 47°37′E
- Country: Madagascar
- Region: Atsimo-Atsinanana
- District: Farafangana
- Elevation: 17 m (56 ft)

Population (2001)
  - Total: 10,000
- Time zone: UTC3 (EAT)
- Postal code: 309

Beretra Bevoay is a town and commune in Madagascar. It belongs to the district of Farafangana, which is a part of Atsimo-Atsinanana Region. The population of the commune was estimated to be approximately 10,000 in 2001 commune census.

Primary and junior level secondary education are available in town. The majority 98.9% of the population of the commune are farmers. The most important crop is coffee, while other important products are cassava, pepper and rice. Services provide employment for 1% of the population. Additionally fishing employs 0.1% of the population.
