= Maheriraty =

- Location in Madagascar
- Coordinates: 22°44′S 47°37′E
- Country: Madagascar
- Region: Atsimo-Atsinanana
- District: Farafangana
- Elevation: 21 m (69 ft)

Population (2001)
  - Total: 2,000
- Time zone: UTC3 (EAT)

Maheriraty is a town and commune in Madagascar. It belongs to the district of Farafangana, which is a part of Atsimo-Atsinanana Region. The population of the commune was estimated to be approximately 2,000 in 2001 commune census.

Only primary schooling is available. The majority 98% of the population of the commune are farmers. The most important crops are coffee and rice; also pepper is an important agricultural product. Services provide employment for 2% of the population.
