= Ambohimandroso, Farafangana =

Coordinates: 22.7635°S 47.5184°E

Ambohimandroso
- Interactive map of Ambohimandroso
- Country: Madagascar
- Region: Atsimo-Atsinanana
- District: Farafangana

Population (2001)
  - Total: 10,000
- Time zone: UTC3 (EAT)

Ambohimandroso is a town and commune in Madagascar. It belongs to the district of Farafangana, which is a part of Atsimo-Atsinanana Region. The population of the commune was estimated to be approximately 10,000 in 2001 commune census.

Only primary schooling is available. The majority 99% of the population of the commune are farmers. The most important crop is coffee, while other important products are cassava, pepper and rice. Services provide employment for 1% of the population.
