= Farafangana Airport =

Airport in Madagascar

- IATA: RVA; ICAO: FMSG

Summary
- Airport type: Public
- Operator: ADEMA (Aéroports de Madagascar)
- Serves: Farafangana
- Location: Atsimo-Atsinanana, Madagascar
- Elevation AMSL: 26 ft / 8 m
- Coordinates: 22°48′19″S 47°49′14″E

Map
- Location within Madagascar

Runways
Direction	Length		Surface
Direction	ft	m	Surface
13/31	3,010	917	Asphalt

Farafangana Airport is an airport in Farafangana, Madagascar (IATA: RVA, ICAO: FMSG).
