= Ambohigogo =

- Location in Madagascar
- Coordinates: 22°46′S 47°35′E
- Country: Madagascar
- Region: Atsimo-Atsinanana
- District: Farafangana
- Elevation: 26 m (85 ft)

Population (2001)
  - Total: 8,000
- Time zone: UTC3 (EAT)

Ambohigogo is a town and commune in Madagascar. It belongs to the district of Farafangana, which is a part of Atsimo-Atsinanana Region. The population of the commune was estimated to be approximately 8,000 in 2001 commune census.

Primary and junior level secondary education are available in town. The majority 99% of the population of the commune are farmers. The most important crops are rice and coffee, while other important agricultural products are cassava and pepper. Services provide employment for 1% of the population.
