= Manombo Special Reserve =

Wildlife reserve in Madagascar

Coordinates: 23°03′S 47°42′E

- IUCN category IV (habitat/species management area)
- Location within Madagascar
- Location: Manombo, FarafanganaAtsimo-Atsinanana, Madagascar
- Area: 205.55 km^{2} (79.36 sq mi)
- Established: 1962
- Governing body: Madagascar National Parks

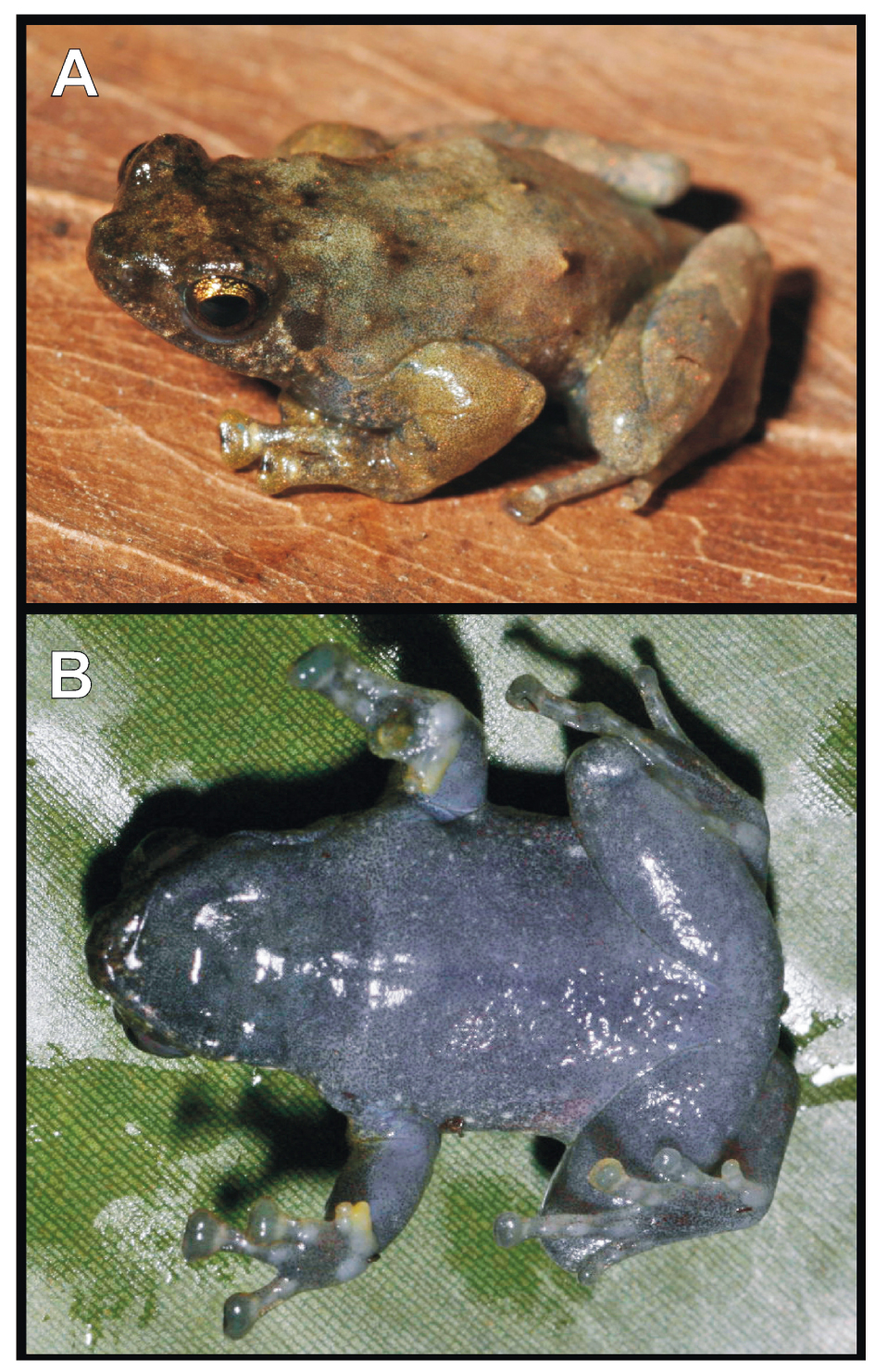
Anodonthyla theoi from Manombo Special Reserve in (A) dorsolateral and (B) ventral views

Manombo Special Reserve is a wildlife reserve of Madagascar. It is situated at the village Manombo, 27 km south from Farafangana from where it can be reached by the National road 12. It covers 5320 ha and is situated along the coastline.

== Biodiversity in Manombo Special Reserve ==
=== Animals ===
The reserve is home to nine lemur species, including two local endemics. One endemic species is critically endangered, while the other is vulnerable. Additionally, two other lemur species are critically endangered, the nocturnal aye-aye is endangered and is vulnerable. Among the 72 bird species found in the reserve, the Madagascar rail is classified as vulnerable. Sixteen reptile species inhabit the reserve, including one chameleon species. The reserve supports 27 amphibian species, with two classified as critically endangered and three as vulnerable. Four carnivoran species are found in the reserve, including two species: the fossa and the Malagasy civet. One of the two bat species in the reserve, the Madagascan flying fox, is considered vulnerable. In addition to these, six other mammal species are recorded within the reserve.

=== Plants ===
The reserve contains 404 plant species, with 74% endemic to Madagascar. This includes four critically endangered palm species, six other endangered species, and two classified as vulnerable. Additionally, there are 11 local endemic species, six of which are critically endangered. One nonendemic species from Madagascar is also classified as critically endangered.
