= Manampatrana River =

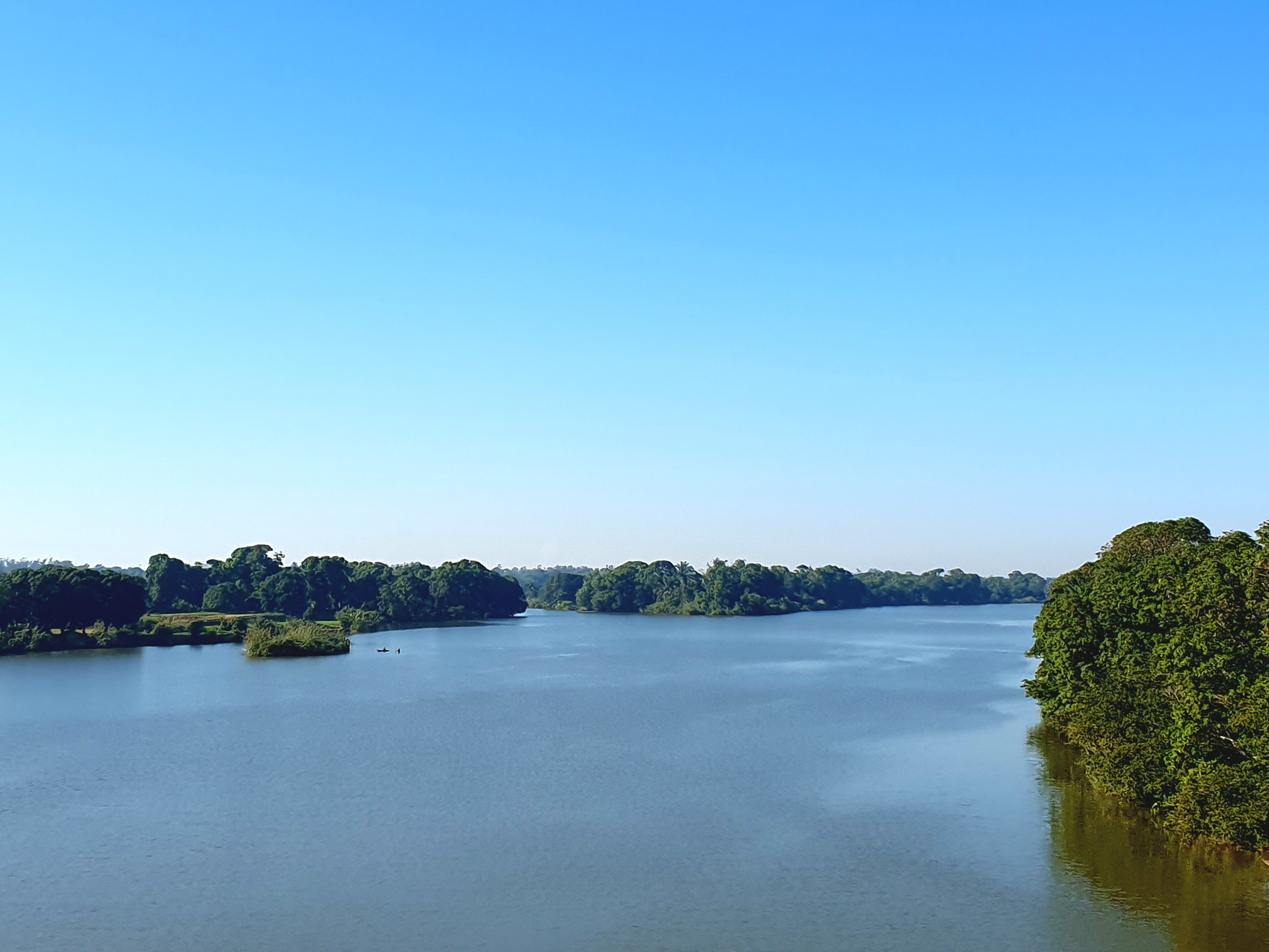
- Manampatrana river at Anosy Tsararafa

Location
- Country: Madagascar
- Region: Atsimo-Atsinanana
- City: Farafangana

Physical characteristics
- Mouth: Indian Ocean
  - location: Farafangana, Atsimo-Atsinanana
  - coordinates: 22°49′10″S 47°49′00″E
  - elevation: 0 m (0 ft)
- Basin size: 3976.52 km2

Basin features
- Tributaries
  - left: Manambava

Manampatrana is a river in the region of Atsimo-Atsinanana in south-eastern Madagascar. It has its springs in the Andringitra Massif and flows into the Indian Ocean north of Farafangana.
