= Farafangana =

Coordinates: 22°49′S 47°49′E

Farafangana Agnambaha Imbahy
- City
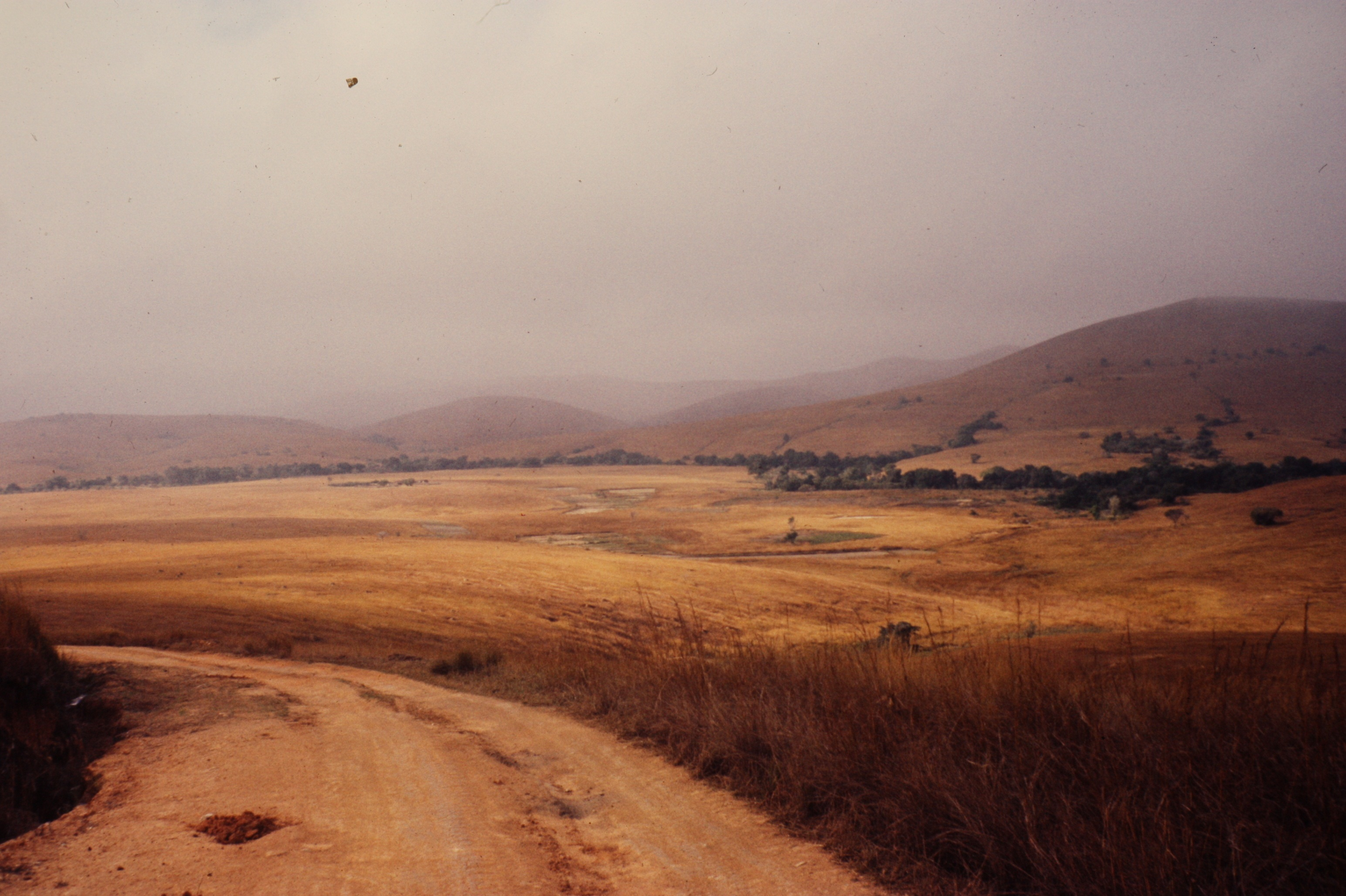
- View to a landscape near the city.

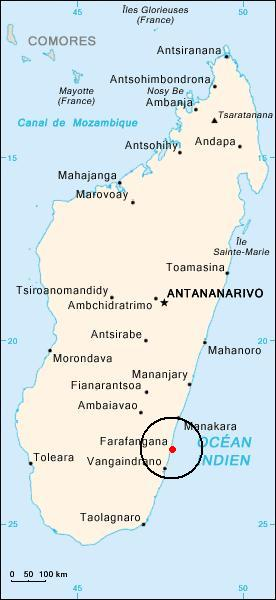
- Location of Farafangana in Madagascar
- Country: Madagascar
- Region: Atsimo-Atsinanana
- District: Farafangana (district)

Area
  - Total: 27.0 km^{2} (10.4 sq mi)
- Elevation: 15 m (49 ft)

Population (2018 census)
  - Total: 34,676
  - Density: 1,280/km^{2} (3,330/sq mi)
- Time zone: UTC+3 (EAT)
- postal code: 309
- Climate: Af
- Website: www.farafangana.com

Farafangana is a city (commune urbaine) on the south-east coast of Madagascar and capital of the Atsimo-Atsinanana region.

== Location ==
Farafangana is the capital of the region Atsimo-Atsinanana located approximately 400 kilometres south of the capital Antananarivo. It is at the southern end of the Canal des Pangalanes, with the mouth of the Manampatrana River located on the north side of the town. It is 106km south of Manakara, about 2.5 hours travel time away.

Settlements located to the north include Lokandambo, Manambotra, Ambahikarabo and Amboahangimamy, with Ambalolo to the west. To the south are Antananabo, Manambotra Atsimo and Marosondry.

== Economy ==
There is an airport in Farafangana (Farafangana Airport). One of the main crops in the region is pepper.

== Population ==
Natives are mainly from ethnic groups Antefasy, Rabakara, Antesaka and Zafisoro.

== Education ==
Farafangana has a university.

== Tourism ==
The Manombo Reserve is located at 25 km to Farafangana.

== Roads ==
- National Road RN 12 from Irondro/Mananjary to Vangaindrano in the South.
- National Road RN 27 to Ihosy.

== Rivers ==
The Manambato and the Manampatrana River that has its mouth into the Indian Ocean at Farafangana.

== Sports ==
- Dato Farafangana FC is the local football club.

== Climate ==
Climate data for Farafangana (1991–2020)
Month	Jan	Feb	Mar	Apr	May	Jun	Jul	Aug	Sep	Oct	Nov	Dec	Year
Record high °C (°F)	34.5 (94.1)	34.4 (93.9)	34.8 (94.6)	34.5 (94.1)	33.7 (92.7)	31.5 (88.7)	30.7 (87.3)	29.9 (85.8)	30.8 (87.4)	32.1 (89.8)	33.3 (91.9)	34.1 (93.4)	34.8 (94.6)
Mean daily maximum °C (°F)	29.5 (85.1)	29.7 (85.5)	29.4 (84.9)	28.5 (83.3)	27.1 (80.8)	25.1 (77.2)	24.2 (75.6)	24.3 (75.7)	25.4 (77.7)	26.8 (80.2)	28.2 (82.8)	29.4 (84.9)	27.3 (81.1)
Daily mean °C (°F)	26.6 (79.9)	26.7 (80.1)	26.3 (79.3)	25.2 (77.4)	23.4 (74.1)	21.4 (70.5)	20.6 (69.1)	20.9 (69.6)	22.1 (71.8)	23.7 (74.7)	25.1 (77.2)	26.3 (79.3)	24.0 (75.2)
Mean daily minimum °C (°F)	23.7 (74.7)	23.7 (74.7)	23.2 (73.8)	21.9 (71.4)	19.7 (67.5)	17.7 (63.9)	16.9 (62.4)	17.4 (63.3)	18.7 (65.7)	20.5 (68.9)	22.0 (71.6)	23.1 (73.6)	20.7 (69.3)
Record low °C (°F)	17.1 (62.8)	17.8 (64.0)	17.0 (62.6)	13.5 (56.3)	12.1 (53.8)	11.2 (52.2)	11.2 (52.2)	11.5 (52.7)	12.3 (54.1)	14.2 (57.6)	14.9 (58.8)	17.0 (62.6)	11.2 (52.2)
Average precipitation mm (inches)	269.5 (10.61)	254.8 (10.03)	294.3 (11.59)	229.6 (9.04)	208.7 (8.22)	138.6 (5.46)	148.8 (5.86)	73.3 (2.89)	69.6 (2.74)	82.5 (3.25)	87.2 (3.43)	159.3 (6.27)	2,016.2 (79.38)
Average precipitation days (≥ 1.0 mm)	17.6	16.7	17.7	15.2	14.0	12.9	13.2	10.0	8.3	8.1	9.2	12.5	155.4
Source: NOAA

== See also ==
- Diocese of Farafangana
- Manombo Reserve
- 2020 Farafangana prison break
