= Zafisoro =

Malagasy ethnic group in southeastern Madagascar

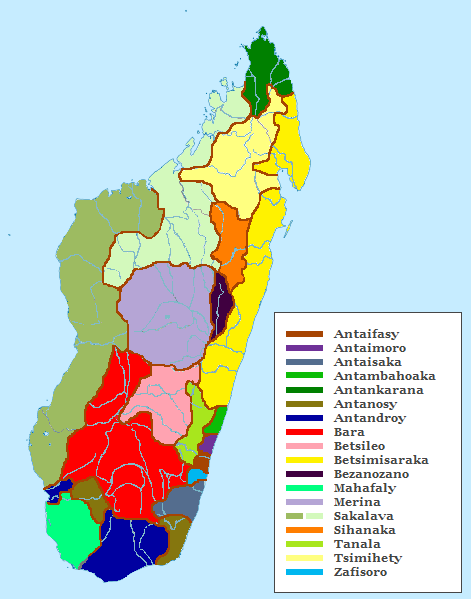
Distribution of Malagasy ethnic groups

The Zafisoro are a Malagasy ethnic group inhabiting a portion of the southeastern coast of Madagascar. The Zafisoro speak a dialect of the Malagasy language, which is a branch of the Malayo-Polynesian language group derived from the Barito languages, spoken in southern Borneo.

== Bibliography ==
- Diagram Group (2013). Encyclopedia of African Peoples. San Francisco, CA: Routledge. ISBN 9781135963415.
- Ogot, Bethwell (1992). Africa from the Sixteenth to the Eighteenth Century. Paris: UNESCO. ISBN 1-84162-197-8.
