= Antaisaka people =

Ethnic group in Madagascar

Antesaka
Total population
- c. 600,000

Regions with significant populations
- Madagascar

Languages
- Antesaka

Related ethnic groups
- Other Malagasy groups, Bantu peoples, Austronesian peoples

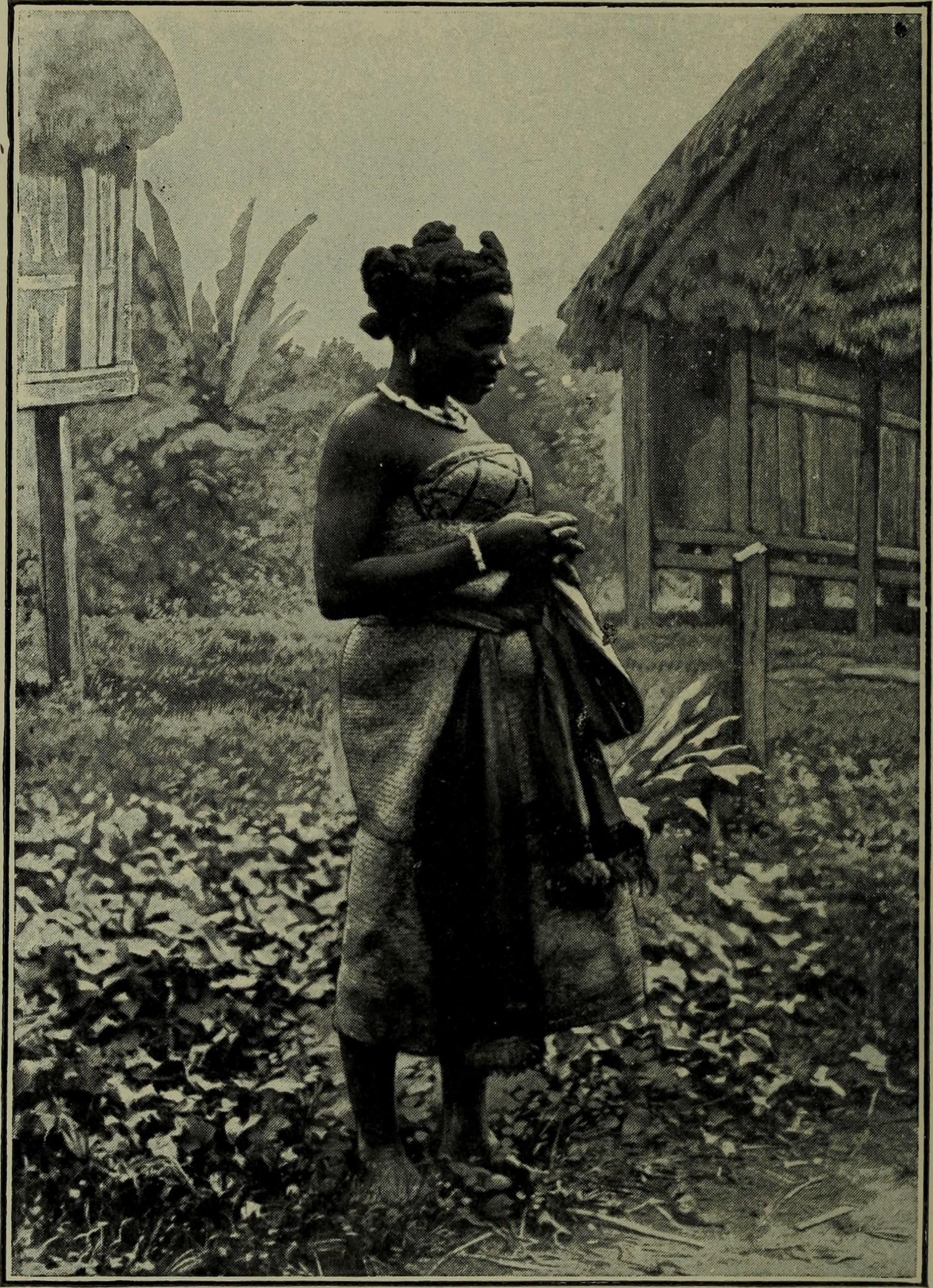
Antaisaka woman circa 1890s

The Antesaka, also known as Tesaka, or Tesaki, are an ethnic group of Madagascar traditionally concentrated south of Farafangana along the south-eastern coast. They have since spread more widely throughout the island. The Antesaka form about 5% of the population of Madagascar.They are named after Isaka, an historical province of the Merina Kingdom. They traditionally have strong marriage taboos and complex funeral rites. The Antesaka typically cultivate coffee, bananas and rice, and those along the coast engage in fishing. A large portion of the population has emigrated to other parts of the island for work, with an estimated 40% of emigrants between 1948 and 1958 permanently settling outside the Antesaka homeland.

The group was founded by Andriamandresy, a Sakalava prince who was cast out of Menabe after engaging in violence upon being passed over in the line of succession. The Antesaka constituted one of the four largest kingdoms in pre-colonial Madagascar by the early 1700s, and a political party founded by two Antesaka brothers in the runup to independence in 1960 went on to produce several local and national leaders. As of 2013, an estimated 600,000 Malagasy identify as Antesaka.

== Ethnic identity ==
Antesaka have mixed African, Arab and Malayo-Polynesian ancestry, and are descended from a royal branch of the coastal Sakalava people of western Madagascar and have one of the higher degree of African DNA among all malagasy tribes. Typical Antesaka are dark brown skin and curly haired. Straight hair and light brown skin are very rare among Antesaka.

== History ==
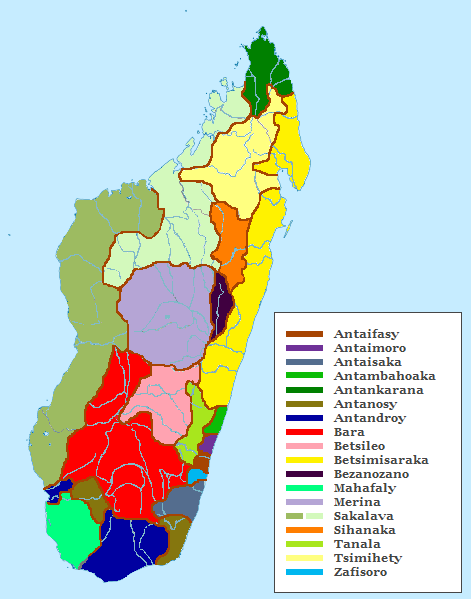
Distribution of Malagasy ethnic groups

Many Antesaka kings descended from the Zarabehava lineage, a royal Sakalava line that crossed to the east coast between 1620 and 1650. The ancestors of the Antesaka migrated from the Menabe Sakalava kingdom and arrived at Nosipandra (today called Vangaindrano) by the 1650s. According to oral history, the founder of the Antesaka clan was named Andriamandresy. He was born Repila in the village of Tsiarepioky, near Mahabo; he later changed his name to Ihazorango, and finally adopted the name Andriamandresiarivo in anticipation of being named king. When his arrogance and stubbornness led the people to support his younger brother's succession instead, Andriamandresy angrily departed and attempted to seize his uncle's rice field by force, mortally wounding him in the process. Outraged, Andriamandresy's mother exiled him from the territory, and Andraimandresy departed toward the east accompanied by warriors and slaves.

By the start of the 18th century, the Antesaka had formed one of the four largest kingdoms on Madagascar. Succession was often contested and a source of internal conflict. According to oral history, a king called Ratongalaza had to kill or exile all his brothers to secure the throne. The last and most important king of the 18th century, Lengoabo, was Ratongalaza's grandson and succeeded in extending the Antesaka territory to its largest extent. In the 19th century, the Antesaka kingdom was invaded by the Merina armies of the Kingdom of Imerina in the central highlands. In the Merina military conquests between 1820 and 1853, captured Antesaka men were typically killed, but women and children were often taken as slaves back to Imerina. Over a million slaves were captured during this time, with the majority from the Antesaka, Antefasy, Antanosy and Betsileo ethnic groups.

France colonized Madagascar in 1895, and the Merina monarchy was disbanded in 1897. When several southern ethnic groups mounted the unsuccessful insurrection du sud rebellion against French colonial administration in 1904–05, the Antesaka refused to become involved.

== Culture ==
=== Fady ===
Family life and marriage in particular is regulated by numerous fady (taboos). Twins are seen as taboo, and were traditionally killed after birth or left in the forest to die. Although this practice has been outlawed, it persists among some traditional communities, and twins are not permitted to be buried alongside their family members.

=== Funeral rites ===
In villages they inhabit rectangular one-room houses made of local plant material. Located on the eastern side of the house, this extra door is only used to remove a corpse from the living quarters. Traditional burial customs involve drying a corpse for two to three years before moving it to a communal burial house called a kibory, which is hidden in a sacred forest restricted to men, termed the ala fady. Before the dried corpse is moved to the kibory, the village practices a ritual called tranondonaky. The dried corpse is moved to a separate house accompanied by the women of the village, who cry together on cue, and then begin to dance. The men gather in the house of the village leader and take turns individually going to the corpse house to affix money to the deceased using a specified type of oil. Until morning, when the corpse is moved to the kibory, the village children will dance to drum music outside. The men transport the body to the sacred forest, where they privately speak their last words to the deceased.

== Language ==
Antesaka speak a dialect of the Malagasy language, which is a branch of the Malayo-Polynesian language group derived from the Barito languages, spoken in southern Borneo.

== Economy ==
Their principal economic activity is the cultivation of coffee, rice and bananas; women are ones primarily responsible for rice harvest, in accordance with local tradition. Those living along the coast often rely on fishing as a principal source of income. Many Antesaka have migrated since the colonial period to seek employment in other parts of the island. Beginning in 1946, the French colonial government organized transportation for Antesaka and Antandroy laborers to work sites in other parts of the island to work on plantations or mines. Annually, an estimated 40% of all Antesaka migrants resettled permanently outside their traditional territory in the early 1960s; these migrants typically sent cash back to their family members at home.

== Bibliography ==
- Bradt, Hilary; Austin, Daniel (2007). Madagascar (9th ed.). Guilford, CT: The Globe Pequot Press Inc. ISBN 978-1-84162-197-5.
- Campbell, Gwyn (2013). Abolition and Its Aftermath in the Indian Ocean, Africa and Asia. New York: Routledge. ISBN 978-1-135-77078-5.
- Campbell, Gwyn (2012). David Griffiths and the Missionary "History of Madagascar". Leiden, The Netherlands: Brill. ISBN 978-90-04-19518-9.
- Campbell, Gwyn (2005). An Economic History of Imperial Madagascar, 1750–1895: The Rise and Fall of an Island Empire. New York: Cambridge University Press. ISBN 978-0-521-83935-8.
- Diagram Group (2013). Encyclopedia of African Peoples. San Francisco, CA: Routledge. ISBN 9781135963415.
- Finch, Michael (2013). A Progressive Occupation?: The Gallieni-Lyautey Method and Colonial Pacification in Tonkin and Madagascar, 1885–1900. Oxford, UK: Oxford University Press. ISBN 978-0-19-967457-2.
- Ogot, Bethwell (1999). Africa from the Sixteenth to the Eighteenth Century. Paris: UNESCO. ISBN 978-0-85255-095-3.
- Thompson, Virginia; Adloff, Richard (1965). The Malagasy Republic: Madagascar Today. Stanford CA: Stanford University Press. ISBN 978-0-8047-0279-9.
- Yakan, Muhammad (1999). Almanac of African Peoples and Nations. New Brunswick, NJ: Transaction Publishers. ISBN 978-1-4128-1677-9.
