= Demographics of Madagascar =

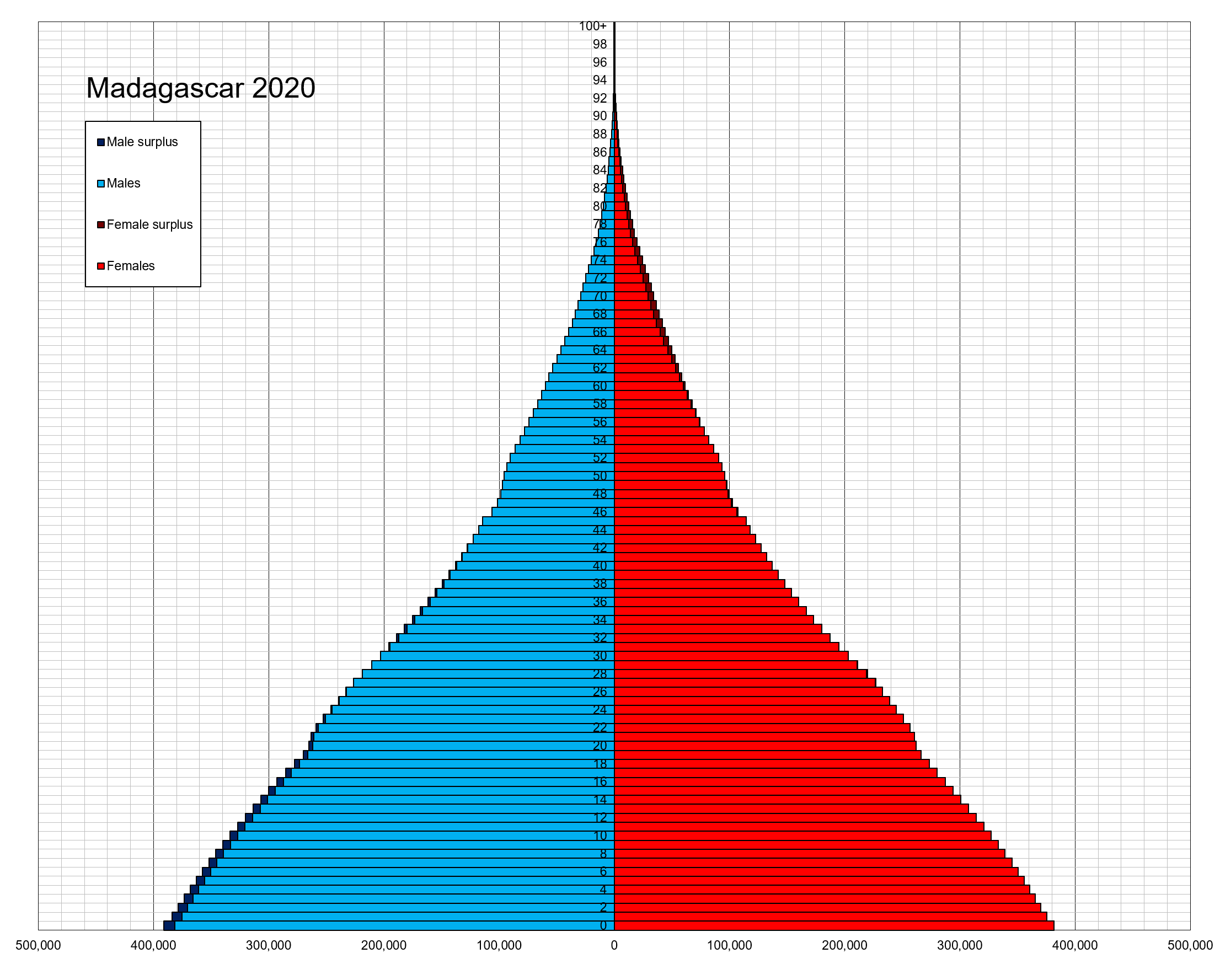
- Population pyramid of Madagascar in 2020
- Population: 28,172,462 (2022 est.)
- Growth rate: 2.27% (2022 est.)
- Birth rate: 28.68 births/1,000 population (2022 est.)
- Death rate: 6 deaths/1,000 population (2022 est.)
- Net migration rate: 0 migrant(s)/1,000 population (2022 est.)

Age structure
- 0–14 years: 38.86%
- 65 and over: 3.47%

Nationality
- Nationality: Malagasy

Language
- Official: Malagasy, French

Demographic features of the population of Madagascar include population density, ethnicity, education level, health of the populace, economic status, religious affiliations and other aspects of the population.

Madagascar's population is predominantly of mixed Austronesian and East-African origin.

Since the country's independence in 1960, three general census of population and dwellings (RGPH) have been conducted by the national statistics office INSTAT under the supervision of the ministry of economy. The first census in 1975 counted 7.4 million Malagasy people, the second one in 1993 censused 12.3 million citizens and the 18 May to 10 June 2018 census numbered 25,674,186 inhabitants.

== Population ==
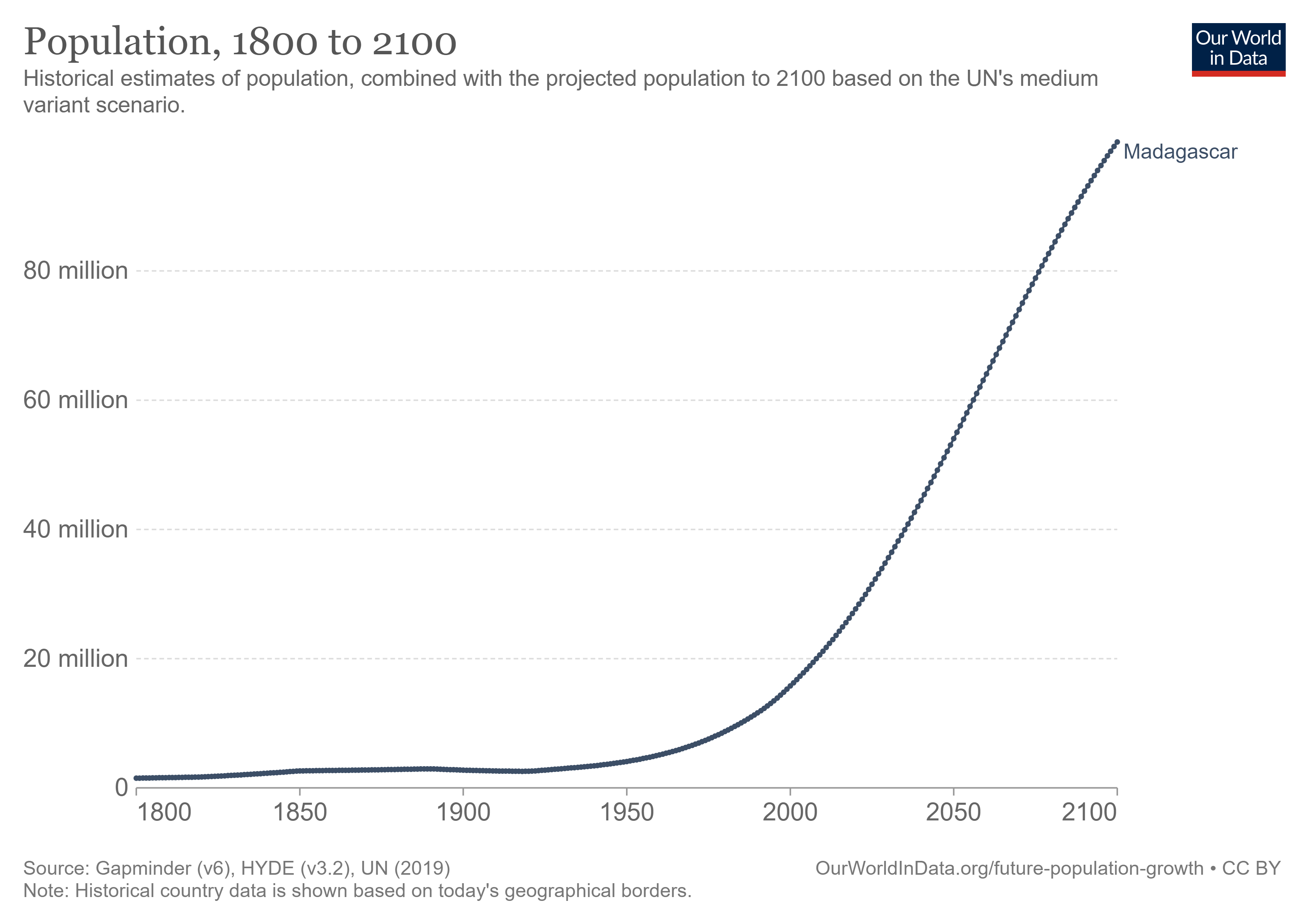
Demographics of Madagascar, Data of Our World in Data, year 2022; number of inhabitants in millions.

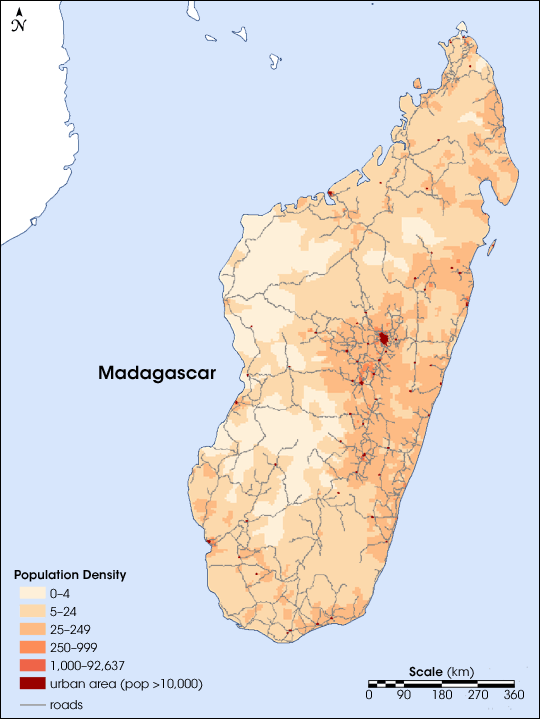
Population density of Madagascar as of 2004

The problem with population estimation in Madagascar is that data is very old and limited. The last population census was carried out in 1993, after an initial 1975 census. There was an attempt at a census in 2009, but this attempt ultimately failed due to political instability. Therefore, the demographic situation is inferred but reliability of any estimates from any source has a large margin of error. According to the 2022 revision of the World Population Prospects the total population was 28,915,653 in 2021, compared to only 4,084,000 in 1950. The proportion of children below the age of 15 in 2010 was 43.1%, 53.8% was between 15 and 65 years of age, while 3.1% was 65 years or older.

	Total population	Population percentages		
	Total population	aged 0–14	aged 15–64	aged 65+
1950	4 084 000	38.2%	58.6%	3.2%
1955	4 548 000	40.2%	56.6%	3.2%
1960	5 104 000	42.6%	54.1%	3.3%
1965	5 764 000	44.6%	52.0%	3.4%
1970	6 549 000	45.1%	51.3%	3.6%
1975	7 502 000	45.6%	50.6%	3.8%
1980	8 609 000	45.9%	50.5%	3.6%
1985	9 785 000	45.1%	51.6%	3.3%
1990	11 281 000	44.7%	52.1%	3.2%
1995	13 129 000	44.5%	52.4%	3.1%
2000	15 364 000	45.3%	51.6%	3.1%
2005	17 886 000	44.6%	52.3%	3.1%
2010	20 714 000	43.1%	53.8%	3.1%

Population Estimates by Sex and Age Group (01.VII.2019) (Unrevised data. Data refer to projections based on the 1993 Population Census.):

Age group	Male	Female	Total	%
Total	12 668 593	12 919 924	25 588 517	100%
0–4	2 140 990	2 208 330	4 349 320	17.00%
5–9	2 046 090	2 055 178	4 101 267	16.03%
10–14	1 787 232	1 715 544	3 502 776	13.69%
15–19	1 395 251	1 354 185	2 749 436	10.74%
20–24	894 670	1 035 834	1 930 504	7.54%
25–29	791 824	871 146	1 662 969	6.50%
30–34	723 266	769 648	1 492 914	5.83%
35–39	657 405	701 492	1 358 897	5.31%
40–44	529 353	577 400	1 106 753	4.33%
45–49	499 305	520 776	1 020 081	3.99%
50–54	446 371	379 375	825 746	3.23%
55–59	292 937	246 664	539 601	2.11%
60–64	163 388	178 418	341 806	1.34%
65-69	111 931	108 062	219 993	0.86%
70-74	91 962	89 849	181 811	0.71%
75-79	53 430	56 044	109 474	0.43%
80-84	29 565	33 412	62 977	0.25%
85+	13 625	18 568	32 193	0.13%
Age group	Male	Female	Total	Percent
0–14	5 974 312	5 979 052	11 953 364	46.71%
15–64	6 393 768	6 634 937	13 028 705	50.92%
65+	300 513	305 935	606 448	2.37%

=== UN population projections ===
UN medium variant projections:

Year	Projected population
2015	23,852,000
2020	27,365,000
2025	31,217,000
2030	35,333,000
2035	39,643,000
2040	44,132,000
2045	48,782,000
2050	53,561,000
2060	65,280,000

== Vital statistics ==
Registration of vital events in Madagascar is not complete. The Population Department of the United Nations prepared the following estimates.

Period	Live births per year	Deaths per year	Natural change per year	CBR (Note: CBR = crude birth rate (per 1000); CDR = crude death rate (per 1000); NC = natural change (per 1000); TFR = total fertility rate (number of children per woman); IMR = infant mortality rate per 1000 births)	CDR	NC	TFR	IMR
1950	192,000	96,000	96,000	48.6	24.4	24.2	7.30	140.1
1951	196,000	99,000	98,000	48.5	24.3	24.1	7.30	138.8
1952	201,000	100,000	101,000	48.4	24.2	24.3	7.30	137.4
1953	206,000	102,000	104,000	48.4	23.9	24.5	7.30	135.5
1954	211,000	103,000	108,000	48.4	23.7	24.7	7.30	133.4
1955	216,000	104,000	111,000	48.3	23.3	24.9	7.30	131.2
1956	221,000	106,000	115,000	48.2	23.1	25.1	7.30	130.0
1957	226,000	107,000	119,000	48.1	22.7	25.4	7.30	128.4
1958	231,000	108,000	123,000	47.9	22.3	25.6	7.30	126.7
1959	236,000	109,000	127,000	47.6	22.0	25.7	7.30	124.9
1960	240,000	109,000	131,000	47.3	21.5	25.8	7.30	122.9
1961	245,000	110,000	135,000	47.0	21.1	25.9	7.30	121.4
1962	250,000	111,000	139,000	46.7	20.7	26.0	7.30	119.5
1963	255,000	112,000	143,000	46.5	20.4	26.1	7.31	117.9
1964	261,000	112,000	148,000	46.3	20.0	26.4	7.31	116.4
1965	267,000	114,000	153,000	46.1	19.7	26.5	7.31	114.9
1966	275,000	115,000	160,000	46.4	19.4	27.0	7.31	113.8
1967	284,000	116,000	168,000	46.6	19.0	27.6	7.30	112.0
1968	294,000	117,000	177,000	46.9	18.6	28.2	7.30	109.8
1969	305,000	118,000	187,000	47.2	18.3	28.9	7.29	107.3
1970	317,000	119,000	197,000	47.6	18.0	29.7	7.27	105.8
1971	331,000	121,000	210,000	48.4	17.7	30.7	7.25	103.9
1972	341,000	123,000	218,000	48.3	17.4	30.9	7.22	101.6
1973	349,000	124,000	225,000	47.9	17.0	30.9	7.19	99.8
1974	356,000	125,000	231,000	47.5	16.7	30.8	7.15	98.8
1975	364,000	127,000	237,000	47.2	16.5	30.7	7.10	98.4
1976	373,000	131,000	243,000	46.9	16.4	30.5	7.04	99.7
1977	383,000	134,000	249,000	46.7	16.3	30.3	6.98	100.9
1978	392,000	137,000	255,000	46.4	16.3	30.1	6.90	102.0
1979	400,000	141,000	259,000	46.0	16.2	29.8	6.81	103.1
1980	406,000	145,000	262,000	45.4	16.2	29.2	6.73	104.2
1981	412,000	149,000	263,000	44.8	16.2	28.6	6.64	105.4
1982	422,000	153,000	269,000	44.5	16.2	28.4	6.55	106.5
1983	431,000	157,000	273,000	44.2	16.1	28.1	6.48	107.3
1984	442,000	161,000	280,000	44.1	16.1	28.0	6.41	107.4
1985	453,000	164,000	289,000	44.0	16.0	28.1	6.35	106.9
1986	463,000	167,000	296,000	43.8	15.8	28.0	6.31	105.7
1987	481,000	169,000	312,000	44.1	15.5	28.6	6.29	103.8
1988	495,000	171,000	325,000	44.2	15.2	29.0	6.21	101.4
1989	510,000	171,000	339,000	44.2	14.9	29.4	6.18	98.5
1990	529,000	172,000	357,000	44.5	14.5	30.0	6.16	95.5
1991	544,000	172,000	372,000	44.4	14.0	30.4	6.12	92.7
1992	560,000	172,000	388,000	44.3	13.6	30.7	6.08	90.0
1993	577,000	170,000	407,000	44.3	13.1	31.3	6.04	87.1
1994	595,000	171,000	424,000	44.3	12.7	31.6	5.99	84.5
1995	613,000	172,000	441,000	44.2	12.4	31.8	5.95	81.8
1996	627,000	172,000	455,000	43.8	12.0	31.7	5.89	79.0
1997	638,000	171,000	467,000	43.2	11.6	31.6	5.80	76.1
1998	645,000	169,000	476,000	42.3	11.1	31.2	5.68	73.1
1999	653,000	169,000	483,000	41.5	10.8	30.7	5.55	70.3
2000	655,000	168,000	487,000	40.4	10.4	30.0	5.40	67.8
2001	665,000	167,000	498,000	39.8	10.0	29.8	5.32	64.9
2002	673,000	168,000	505,000	39.1	9.7	29.3	5.23	62.6
2003	685,000	167,000	519,000	38.7	9.4	29.3	5.17	60.2
2004	699,000	165,000	533,000	38.3	9.1	29.2	5.13	58.0
2005	715,000	166,000	549,000	38.0	8.8	29.2	5.10	55.8
2006	731,000	164,000	567,000	37.8	8.5	29.3	5.06	53.9
2007	746,000	165,000	582,000	37.4	8.3	29.2	5.00	52.0
2008	760,000	165,000	595,000	37.1	8.1	29.0	4.93	50.2
2009	776,000	165,000	611,000	36.7	7.8	28.9	4.87	48.6
2010	783,000	168,000	616,000	36.0	7.7	28.3	4.76	47.1
2011	784,000	166,000	618,000	35.1	7.4	27.6	4.61	45.8
2012	787,000	170,000	618,000	34.3	7.4	26.9	4.47	44.6
2013	795,000	170,000	625,000	33.7	7.2	26.5	4.36	43.4
2014	801,000	171,000	630,000	33.1	7.1	26.0	4.25	42.3
2015	814,000	175,000	639,000	32.8	7.0	25.7	4.18	41.3
2016	836,000	174,000	662,000	32.8	6.8	25.9	4.16	40.3
2017	850,000	178,000	672,000	32.5	6.8	25.7	4.11	39.3
2018	862,000	181,000	681,000	32.1	6.7	25.4	4.04	38.2
2019	948,000	212,000	736,000	33.6	7.5	26.1	4.22	45.2
2020	964,000	228,000	737,000	33.3	7.9	25.4	4.17	45.2
2021	977,000	236,000	741,000	32.9	7.9	25.0	4.10	45.2
2022	989,000	235,000	754,000	32.5	7.7	24.8	4.04	45.1
2023	1,001,000	235,000	766,000	32.1	7.5	24.6	3.97	45.0

Source: UN DESA, World Population Prospects, 2022

=== Demographic and Health Surveys ===
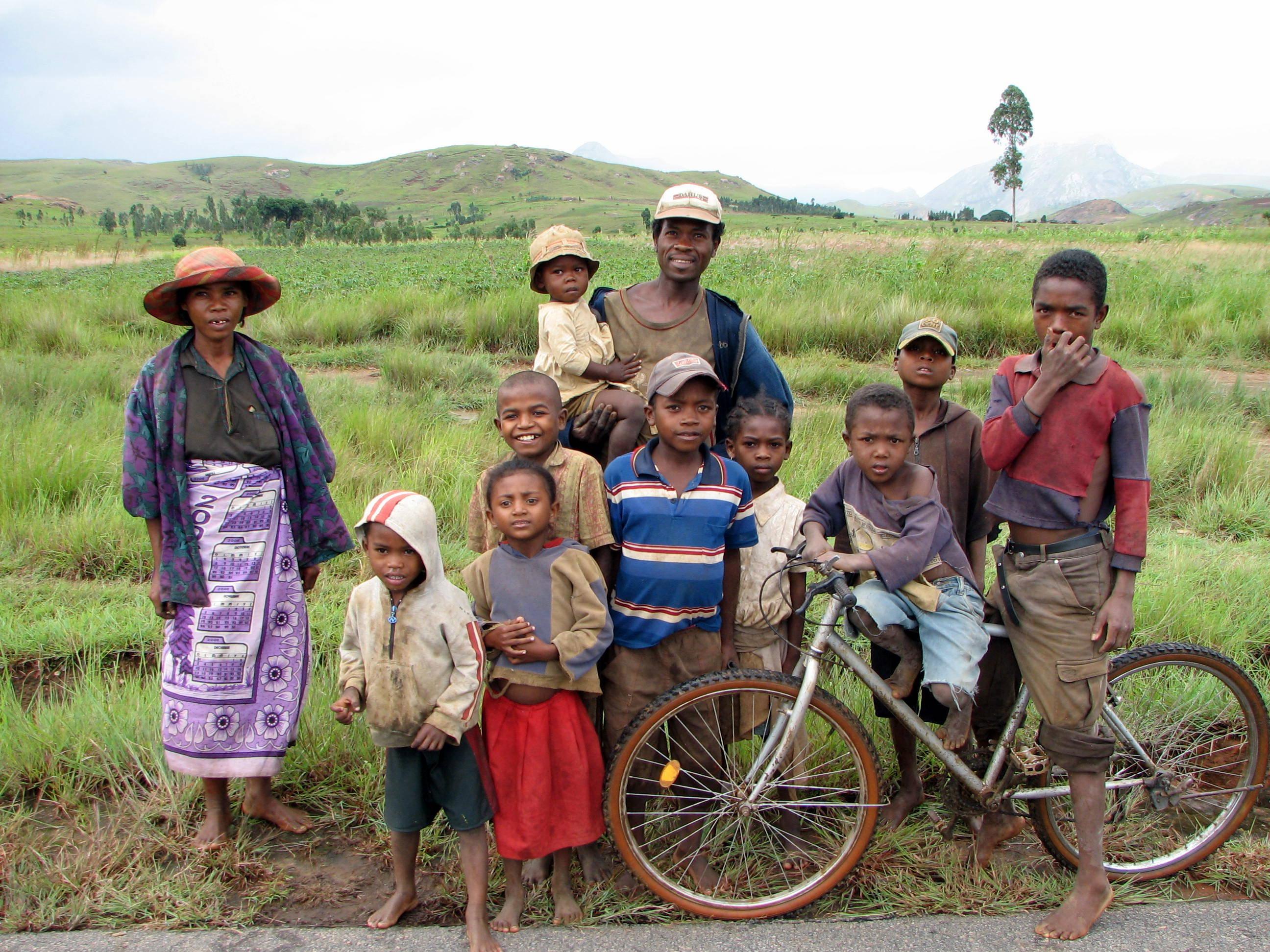
Many rural regions of Madagascar have high birthrates

Total Fertility Rate (TFR) and Crude Birth Rate (CBR):

Year	Total		Urban		Rural	
Year	CBR	TFR	CBR	TFR	CBR	TFR
1992	43.3	6.13 (5.2)	34.2	3.84 (3.0)	45.1	6.69 (5.8)
1997	42.3	5.97 (5.2)	34.5	4.19 (3.8)	45.0	6.66 (5.8)
2003–04	35.3	5.2 (4.7)	28.7	3.7 (3.4)	37.2	5.7 (5.1)
2008–09	33.4	4.8 (4.2)	24.8	2.9 (2.5)	34.8	5.2 (4.5)
2011	34.9	5.2	23.7	3.0	36.0	5.4
2013	30.6	4.4	24.0	3.0	31.2	4.5
2016	30.9	4.1	23.8	2.7	31.7	4.3
2021	32.3	4.3 (3.8)	27.6	3.2 (2.8)	33.4	4.6 (4.1)

Fertility data as of 2008-2009 (DHS Program):

View source data.
View source data.
View source data.

Region	Total fertility rate	Percentage of women age 15–49 currently pregnant	Mean number of children ever born to women age 40–49
Analamanga	3.4	5.7	4.3
Vakinankaratra	5.3	7.4	6.0
Itasy	5.5	6.7	6.9
Bongolava	3.8	6.9	5.4
Haute Matsiatra	6.4	7.5	6.8
Amoron'i Mania	6.1	5.3	6.7
Vatovavy Fitovinany	6.5	10.3	6.5
Ihorombe	5.9	10.6	5.5
Atsimo Atsinanana	6.3	11.4	6.0
Atsinanana	3.0	9.2	4.1
Analanjirofo	4.6	6.6	5.7
Alaotra Mangoro	5.0	9.1	5.5
Boeny	4.5	9.1	4.9
Sofia	4.4	10.7	5.9
Betsiboka	4.7	10.5	6.1
Melaky	4.7	12.2	5.5
Atsimo Andrefana	6.2	13.2	6.3
Androy	6.4	10.8	5.6
Anosy	5.5	8.6	5.7
Menabe	4.8	11.3	5.9
Diana	3.7	6.8	4.9
Sava	4.5	6.3	5.0

=== Life expectancy ===
Period	Life expectancy in Years	Period	Life expectancy in Years
1950–1955	36.3	1985–1990	49.9
1955–1960	38.8	1990–1995	52.7
1960–1965	41.2	1995–2000	56.7
1965–1970	43.5	2000–2005	60.0
1970–1975	46.0	2005–2010	62.2
1975–1980	48.1	2010–2015	64.5
1980–1985	49.7		

Source: UN World Population Prospects

== Ethnicity ==
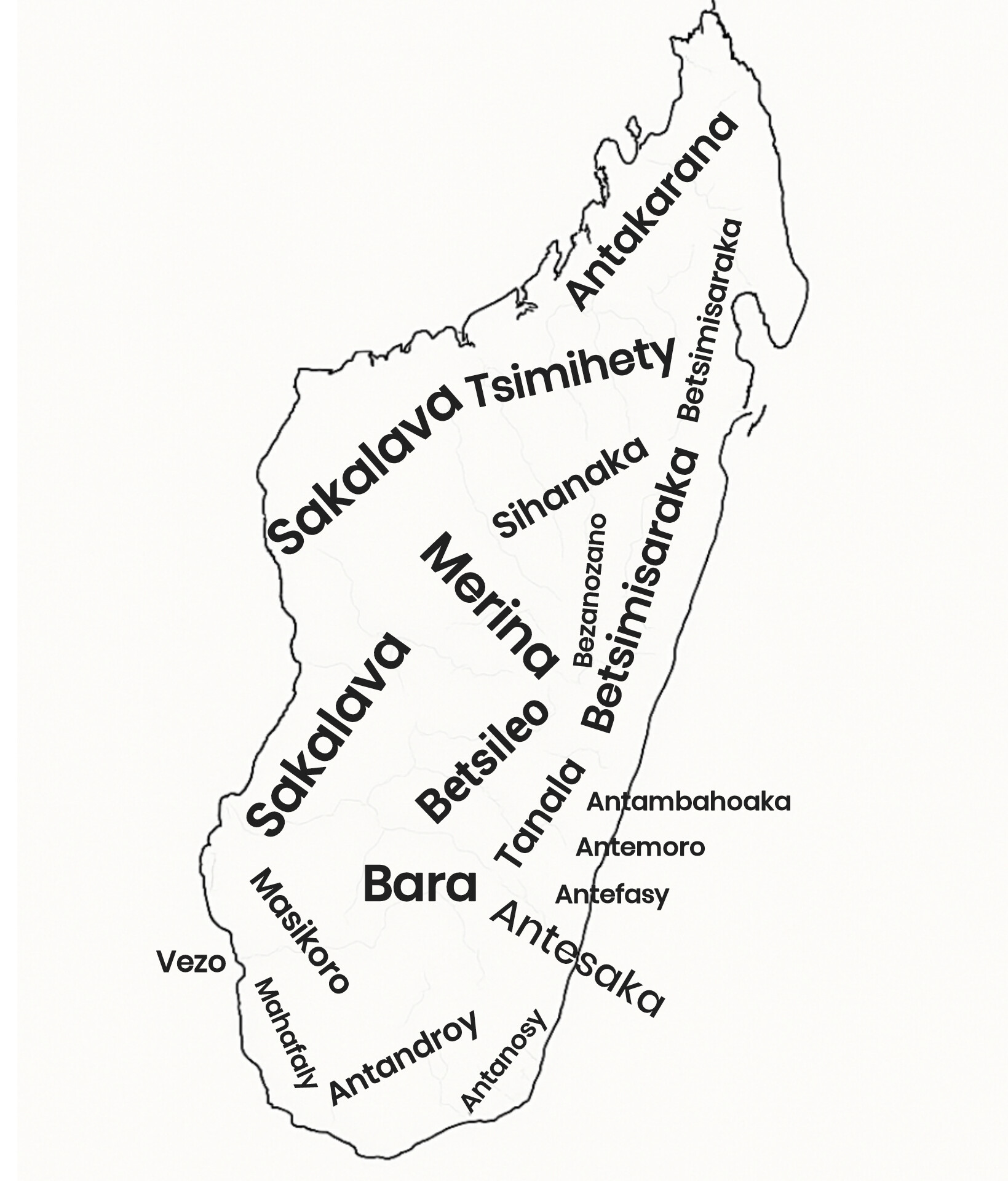
Distribution of major Malagasy tribes

The island of Madagascar is predominantly populated by people broadly classified as belonging to the Malagasy ethno-linguistic group. This group is further subdivided a number of ethnic groups, often into the standard eighteen. In addition, communities of Indians, Arabs and Somalis in Madagascar have long been established on the island and have assimilated into local communities to varying degrees, in some places having long since become identified "Malagasy" ethnic groups, and in others maintaining distinct identities and cultural separation. More recent arrivals include Europeans and Chinese immigrants.

Madagascar was probably uninhabited prior to Austronesian settlement in the early centuries AD. Austronesian (particularly Malay) features are most predominant in the central highlands peoples, while coastal peoples are phenotypically more East African, sometimes with minor Arab, Somali, European and Indian admixtures. The largest coastal groups are the Betsimisaraka (1,500,000) and the Tsimihety and Sakalava (700,000 each). Malagasy society has long been polarized between the politically and economically advantaged highlanders of the central plateaux and the people along the coast. For example, in the 1970s there was widespread opposition among coastal ethnics against the policy of "Malagasization" which intended to phase out the use of the French language in public life in favour of a more prominent position for the Malagasy language, whose orthography is based on the Merina dialect.

Indians in Madagascar descend mostly from traders who arrived in the newly independent nation looking for better opportunities. The majority of them came from the west coast of India known as Karana (Muslim) and Banian (Hindu). The majority speak Hindi or Gujarati, although some other Indian languages are also spoken. Nowadays the younger generations speak at least three languages, including French, Gujarati and Malagasy. A large number of the Indians in Madagascar have a high level of education, particularly the younger generation.

A sizeable number of Europeans also reside in Madagascar, mostly of French descent.

== Languages ==
Malagasy is the national language, and shares the status of official language with French.

According to the 2018 census, 99.9% of the population aged 3 and more can speak Malagasy, 23.6% can speak French, 8.2% can speak English, and 0.6% can speak another language.

== Religion ==
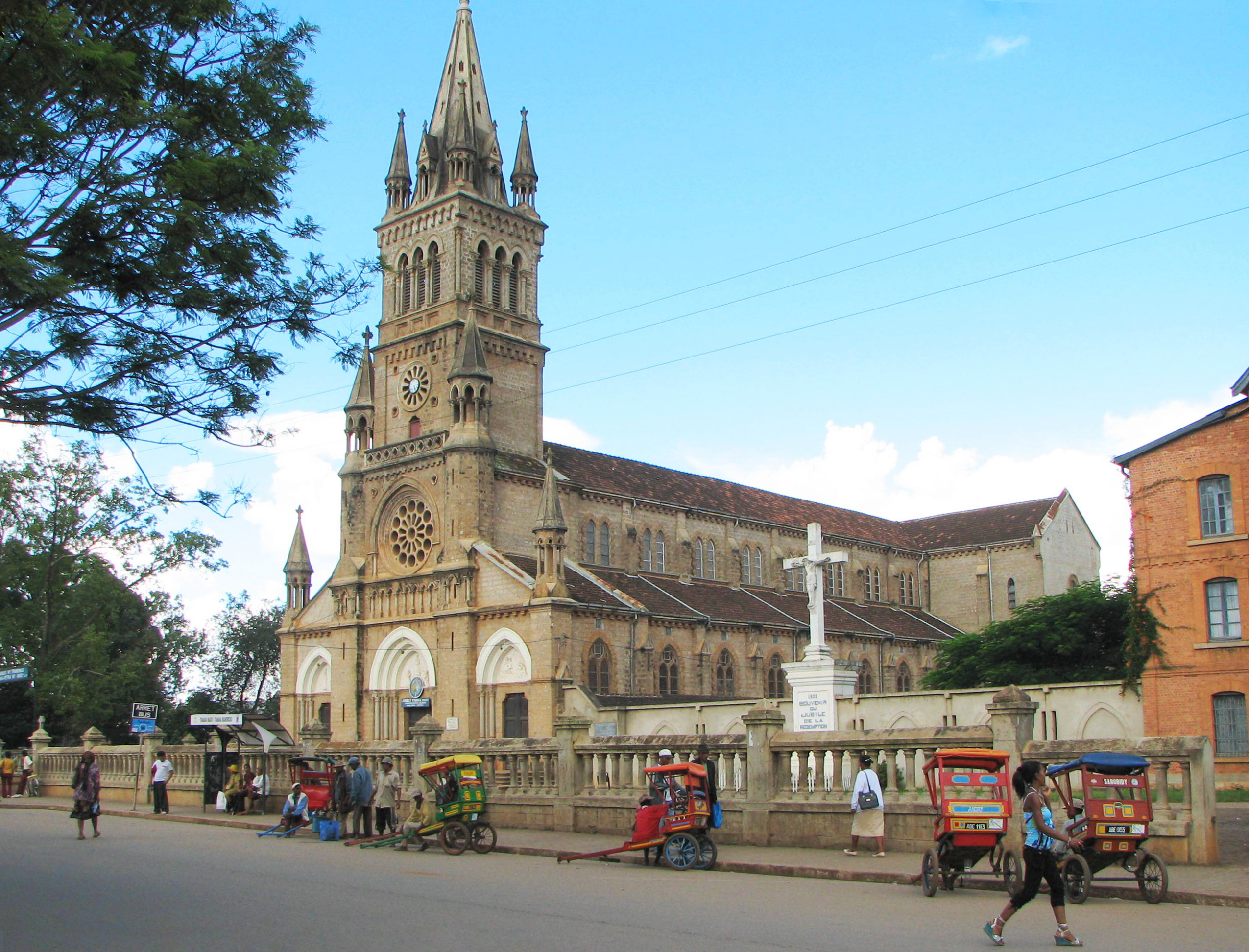
Roman Catholic cathedral in Antsirabe.

Religion in Madagascar (2020) according to the Pew Research Center
1. Christian (85.4%)
2. Folk religions (4.60%)
3. Muslim (3.00%)
4. Unaffiliated/Other (7.00%)

According to the 1993 national census, 41% of Malagasies practised Christianity and 52% practise traditional religion, which tends to emphasize links between the living and the razana (ancestors); by 2020, only 4.5% of Malagasies exclusively practised folk religions and 85% were Christian (according to the Pew Research Center). The Association of Religion Data Archives noted that in 2020, 58.1% of the population is Christian, 2.1% is Muslim and 39.2% practices traditional faiths, while 0.6% of the population is non-religious or adheres to other faiths.

Madagascar's traditional religions tend to emphasize links between the living and the dead. They believe that the dead join their ancestors in the ranks of divinity and that ancestors are intensely concerned with the fate of their living descendants. This spiritual communion is celebrated by the Merina and Betsileo reburial practice of famadihana, or "turning over the dead". In this ritual, relatives' remains are removed from the family tomb, rewrapped in new silk shrouds, and returned to the tomb following festive ceremonies in their honor. In the festivities, they eat, drink, and literally dance with the dead. After one or two days of celebrating, they shower the body with gifts and rebury it.

Malagasy Christians are roughly 50% Catholic and 50% Protestant (mainly Reformed Protestant Church of Jesus Christ in Madagascar (FJKM), Lutheran, and Anglican), but there are also smaller groups such as members of the Church of Jesus Christ of Latter-day Saints (Mormons), Jehovah's Witnesses, Seventh-day Adventists, Eastern Orthodox Christians and evangelicals. Many incorporate the cult of the dead with their other religious beliefs and bless their dead at church before proceeding with the traditional burial rites. They also may invite a pastor to attend a famadihana. A historical rivalry exists between the predominantly Catholic masses, considered to be underprivileged, and the predominantly Protestant Merina aristocrats, who tend to prevail in the civil service, business, and professions.

Followers of Islam constitute approximately 3% of the population in 2022, according to the US Department of State; there are also small numbers of Hindus and Jews.

The Church of Jesus Christ of Latter-day Saints had more than 13,000 members in 42 congregations in Madagascar in 2013.

A small community started practicing Judaism in 2010, and formally converted in 2016 with the assistance of Kulanu, a nonprofit organization focusing on remote Jewish communities.

== See also ==
- Matthew E. Hules, et al. (2005). The Dual Origin of the Malagasy in Island Southeast Asia and East Africa: Evidence from Maternal and Paternal Lineages. American Journal of Human Genetics, 76:894-901, 2005.
