= Atsimo-Atsinanana =

Coordinates: 22.819°S 47.83°E

Atsimo-Atsinanana Region
- Region
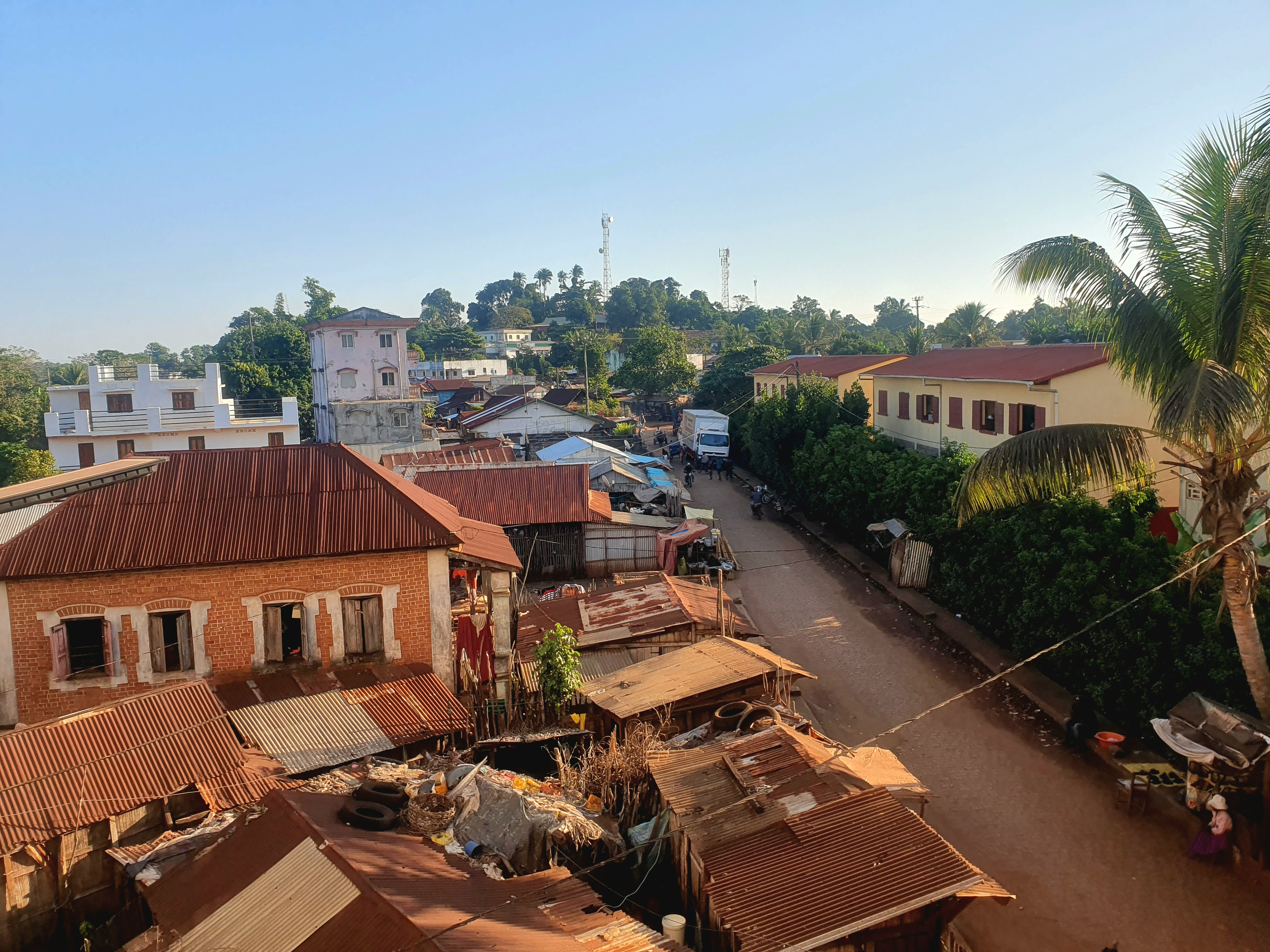
- Vangaindrano

- Location in Madagascar
- Country: Madagascar
- Capital: Farafangana

Government
  - Gouvenor: Justin Mahafaky

Area
  - Total: 18,863 km^{2} (7,283 sq mi)

Population (2018)
  - Total: 1,026,674
  - Density: 54.428/km^{2} (140.97/sq mi)
  - Ethnicities: Antaisaka (majority); Antaifasy; Bara; Antaimoro; Tanala; Merina; Sahafatra; Chinese
- Time zone: UTC3 (EAT)
- HDI (2018): 0.418 low · 21st of 22

Atsimo-Atsinanana (South East) is a region in Madagascar. Its capital is Farafangana. The region used to be part of the Fianarantsoa Province.

The region extends along the southern part of the east coast of Madagascar. It is bordered by Fitovinany and Haute Matsiatra (North), Ihorombe (West) and Anosy (South).

The population was 1,026,674 in 2018. It is among the poorest regions in the country, with a poverty rate of 83.9% according to a 2005 government report.

== Administrative divisions ==
Atsimo-Atsinanana Region is divided into five districts, which are sub-divided into 90 communes.

- Befotaka Sud District - 6 communes
- Farafangana District - 30 communes
- Midongy-Atsimo District - 6 communes
- Vangaindrano District - 28 communes
- Vondrozo District - 16 communes

== Transport ==
=== Airports ===
- Farafangana Airport
- Vangaindrano Airport

=== Roads ===
- National Road RN 12 to Farafangana in the North.
- National Road 12a to Fort Dauphin (South).
- RN T18 unpaved track to Nosifeno and the Midongy du sud National Park.

== Rivers ==
- Manampatrana River - (mouth near Farafangana)
- Mananara River - ( mouth near Vangaindrano)
- Masianaka river - (mouth near Masianaka)
- Mamandro river (southern border to Anosy, mouth at Manambondro

== Protected Areas ==
- Part of Fandriana-Vondrozo Corridor
- Agnakatrika New Protected Area
- Agnalazaha New Protected Area
- Ankarabolava New Protected Area
- Midongy Atsimo National Park
- Manombo Reserve

== Economy ==
=== Mining ===
- Ankaizina mine
- Farafangana mine
