= Kingdom of Manandriana =

Betsileo kingdom in Madagascar

Kingdom of Manandriana Fanjakan'I Manandriana (Malagasy)
- c. 1650–1896
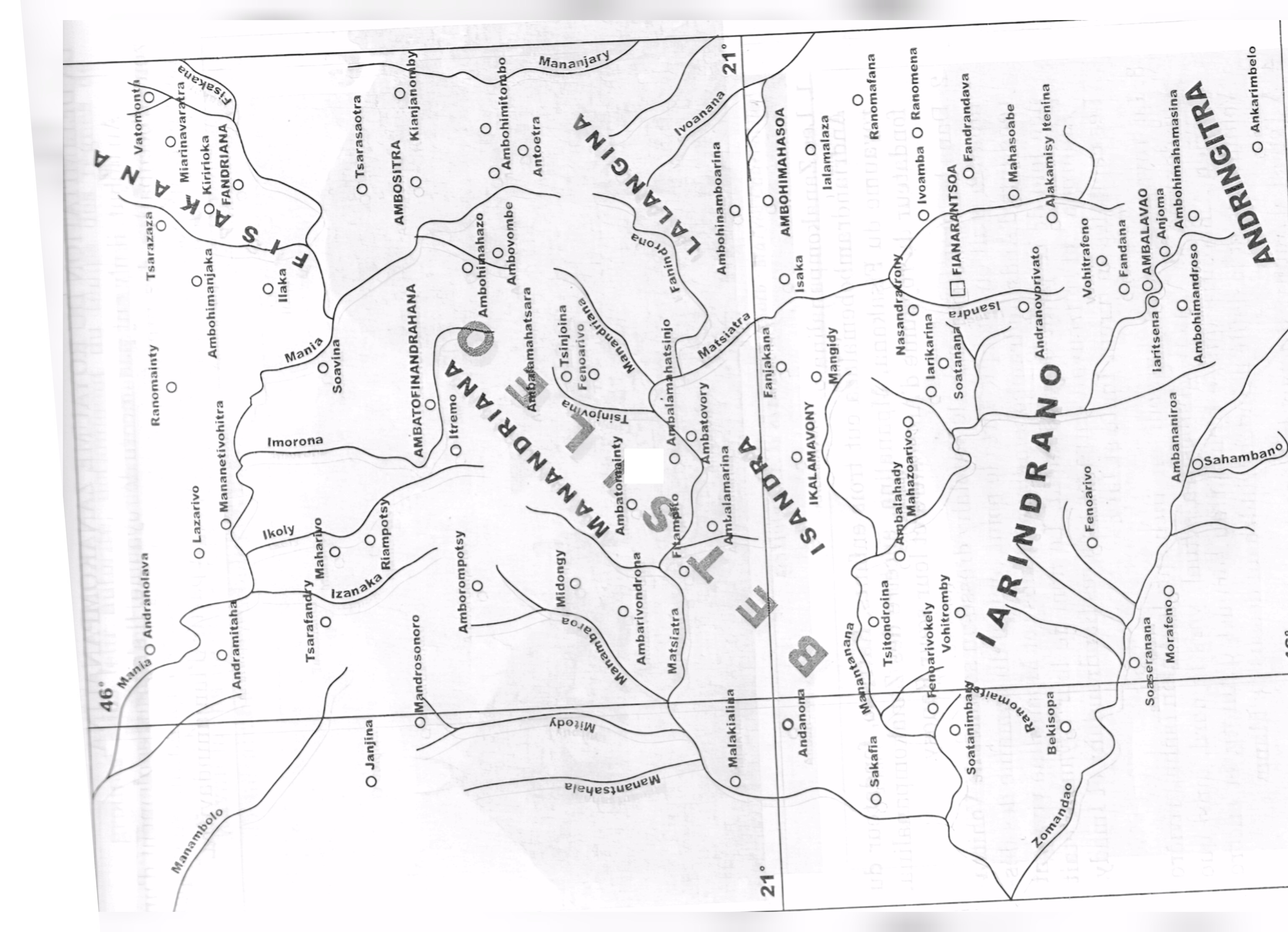
- Kingdom of Manandriana with its capital Ambovombe and the Manandriana River, which it was named after.
- Capital: Fihasinana
- Common languages: Betsileo
- Religion: Traditional beliefs Protestantism (later)
- Government: Absolute monarchy
- Historical era: Pre-colonial
  - Foundation: c. 1650
  - French conquest: 1896
| Succeeded by |
| Merina kingdom |
- Today part of: Madagascar

Manandriana is a Betsileo kingdom in central Madagascar established in the 17th century. It is named after the Manandriana river.

== History ==
The kingdom was founded by Andrianantara I of Matitanese origin in 1650. Kingdom of Manandriana became a vassal of the Imerina Kingdom after the king Andriananantara IV accepted Andrianampoinimerina suzerainty.

== List of rulers ==
- Andrianantara I
- Andrianantara II
- Rasomotrarindrano
- Andrianantara III
- Andrianantara IV
- Ramonjamanana (died in 1893)

== Location ==
It is bordered by Fisakana in the north and by Isandra and Lalangina in the south. It shares border with the Bara tribe in the West. It is now part of Manandriana District and Ambatofinandrahana District
