= Vakinankaratra dialect =

Austronesian language of Madagascar

Vakinankaratra
- Native to: Madagascar
- Ethnicity: Vakinankaratra
- Language family: Austronesian: Malayo-Polynesian; Western Indonesian; Barito; East Barito; Central-Eastern Malagasic; Plateau Malagasy; Vakinankaratra
- Writing system: Latin script (Malagasy alphabet)

Language codes
- ISO 639-1: mg
- ISO 639-3: plt
- Vakinankaratra dialect sample A woman talking about Radio Haja Antsirabe to two men in the local Vakinankaratra dialect.

Vakinankaratra is a dialect of the Malagasy language spoken in the eponymous region. It is considered an intermediary dialect between Merina dialect and Betsileo dialect.

== Classification ==
Vakinankaratra is an Austronesian language part of the Plateaux branch of Malagasy language alongside Merina, Antefasy, Antemoro, Sihanaka and Betsileo

== Characteristics ==
The Vakinankaratra dialect exhibits features not found in Merina varieties (Analamanga, Itasy, Bongolava, Betsiboka) and shows some forms similar to Betsileo. Lexically, it uses forms such as aby for avy, a for izaho, Ia for iza, and aia for aiza. The particle tsa corresponds to tsy in Merina varieties.

Phonetically, the dialect frequently omits the consonant n or m, as in tantara → tatara, Ampy → Apy and manka → maka. Vowel sequences such as -ia and -a often shift to -e, for example tetezana → tatezana. Certain words also differ, such as masiaka in Merina varieties appearing as maseka in Vakinankaratra.

Grammatical particles such as ka, tra, and na are shared with other Merina regions; they are used to connect clauses, indicate emphasis, or mark the subject in a sentence. Unlike Betsileo, Vakinankaratra does not retain the -gn suffix, using forms ending in -na instead. These features position Vakinankaratra as an intermediary dialect between Merina and Betsileo.

== Geographic distribution ==
Historically, the Vakinankaratra dialect was spoken throughout the Vakinankaratra Region.

In contemporary usage, the dialect is no longer spoken as a distinct variety in urban areas such as Antsirabe. However, speakers in the city retain a limited amount of Vakinankaratra vocabulary as well as phonological features, particularly aspects of the local accent. The dialect is now mainly confined to rural areas of the region, especially in parts of the districts of Antsirabe II, Betafo, and Mandoto. In urban and peri-urban contexts, it has largely been replaced by the Merina dialect of the Analamanga, which has become the dominant form of speech.

== Vocabulary ==
Numbers
#	Gloss	Merina / Standard Malagasy	Vakinankaratra
1	One	Iray	Iray / Raika

Pronouns
#	Gloss	Merina / Standard Malagasy	Vakinankaratra
2	I / Me	Izaho / Aho	Za / A / Aako
3	He / She / Him / Her	Izy	Izy
4	We	Izahay	Anay
5	They / Them	Zareo	Reo

Demonstratives
#	Gloss	Merina / Standard Malagasy	Vakinankaratra
6	This	Ity / Iry	Ity / Iry or Itikatra / Irikatra (rare)
7	That / There	Ary	Ary or Arikatra (rare)
8	That (far)	Iry	Iry or Irikatra (rare)

Location
#	Gloss	Merina / Standard Malagasy	Vakinankaratra
9	Here	Aty	Aty or Atikatra (rare)
10	Where?	Aiza?	Aia?
11	How far?	Hatraiza?	Hatraia?
12	Upstairs	Efitra ambony	Am-batra
13	Downstairs	Efitra ambany	An-tany
14	Outside	Ivelan'ny trano	Andrindrina / Alatrano
15	Home	An-trano	An-drano

Questions
#	Gloss	Merina / Standard Malagasy	Vakinankaratra
16	Who?	Iza?	Ia?
17	Where is he/she/it?	Mka aiza izy?	Aia ii?
18	Who is there?	Iza no ao?	Ia aby no ao?

Negation
#	Gloss	Merina / Standard Malagasy	Vakinankaratra
19	Not	Tsy	Tsary / Tsa
20	Never	Intsony	Intsony / Tsotry

Intensity
#	Gloss	Merina / Standard Malagasy	Vakinankaratra
21	Really / Very	Tokoa / Tena	Tokoa / Tena or Tokoatra / Tegna (rare)
22	Cold	Mangatsiaka	Mangitsy
23	Sad / Makes sad	Mampalahelo	Mahonena / Manena

Frequency
#	Gloss	Merina / Standard Malagasy	Vakinankaratra
24	All	Avy	Aby
25	Fast	Haingana	Azela
26	Very fast	Haingakaingana	Azelazela

Daily Life
#	Gloss	Merina / Standard Malagasy	Vakinankaratra
27	Family	Fianakaviana	Fianakavena
28	Child	Ankizy	Akizy
29	Question	Fanontaniana	Fanontanena
30	To swim	Milomano	Mandano
31	To ask the doctor	Dokotera anontaniana	Dokotera anontanena
32	To study	Mianatra zaho	Mianatra a
33	To sing (We sing Nej's songs)	Mihira hiran'i Nej' zahay	Mihira hiran'i Nej' anay
34	History	Tantara	Tatara
65	Bridge	Tetezana	Tatezana

Expressions
#	Gloss	Merina / Standard Malagasy	Vakinankaratra
35	Good morning everyone	Manao ahoana daholo anareo	Manakory aby nareo
36	How are you doing	Manao ahoana anareo e	Manakory anareo e
37	Hurry up!	Aza ela!	Azela!
38	Later on / then	Rehefa avy eo	Sefa hatreo
39	Bring it here	Hoento aty	Ôtatyyy
40	Come here	Avia eto / Avia aty	Ambia anga androky
41	Surprise expression	Hay ve?	Kay viiii!
42	He isn't ashamed of things like that	Tsy menatra izy amin'ny zavatra ohatr'izany	Tsa menatra izy amin'ny zavatra ohatrizany
43	I like / I love	Tiako	Tieko
44	I can't bear	Tsy tantiko	Tsy tatiko
45	I don't like him	Tsy tia azy izaho	Tsa te aniny a
46	Thanks / Thank you	Misaotra	Sôtry

Objects
#	Gloss	Merina / Standard Malagasy	Vakinankaratra
47	Firewood	Kitay	Kità
48	Shopping bag	Harona	Taty bazary
49	Bottle	Tavoahangy	Tavangy

Verbs
#	Gloss	Merina / Standard Malagasy	Vakinankaratra
50	To take / To pick	Maka / Mangala	Maka
51	Sit down (order)	Mipetraha	Mitôra
52	To sit / To be seated	Mipetraka	Mitôtra
53	To fall down	Mianjera	Mezera / Mikodia / Mkinjika
54	Boiled	Mangotraka	Mandevy
55	To drop	Latsaka	Katraka / Potraka
56	To bump / To hit	Midona	Midotra
57	To run	Mihazakazaka	Mandainday
58	To leave / To exit	Miainga/miala	Miinga
59	To pour (rice, etc.)	Mandoatra	Alozina
60	To arrange / To make tidy	Ampirimina	Atsaraizina
61	To arrive	Tonga	Tamy
62	To be pierced	Goaka	Tsobaka
63	To depend / To rely on	Miankina	Miakina
