= Central-Eastern Malagasic =

Malagasy language subgroup

- Geographic distribution: Madagascar
- Linguistic classification: Austronesian: Malayo-Polynesian; Barito; East Barito; Central-Eastern Malagasic
- Subdivisions: Plateau Malagasy; Southern Betsimisaraka; Antesaka; Sahafatra

Language codes
- Glottolog: cent2382

Central-Eastern Malagasic is a group of the Malagasy dialects spoken in the central and eastern parts of Madagascar from which Standard Malagasy came out. It is one of malagasy dialectal groups along with Northern Malagasic and Southern Malagasic.

== Classification ==
Central-Eastern Malagasic belongs to the Austronesian language family, specifically within the Malayo-Polynesian branch. It is part of the Barito group, more precisely the East Barito subgroup. In his 1878 work A Sketch of the Modern Languages of the East Indies, orientalist Robert Needham Cust identified a linguistic affinity between the dialects spoken by the Tanala, Bezanozano, and Sihanaka peoples of Madagascar's eastern interior and those of the Southern Betsimisaraka of Eastern Coast. He considered these dialects to be closely allied, effectively grouping them into a single linguistic cluster corresponding to what is now referred to as the Central-Eastern Malagasy language group.

== Geographic distribution ==
Languages in the Central-Eastern Malagasic group are primarily spoken in the central highlands and eastern regions of Madagascar. These areas include province of Antananarivo, Fianarantsoa, and Toamasina.

Central-Eastern Malagasic dialects and their regions
Dialect	Regions	Subdivision
Merina; Standard Malagasy	Analamanga; Vakinankaratra; Itasy; Bongolava	Plateau Malagasy
Vakinankaratra	Vakinankaratra	Plateaux Malagasy
Sihanaka	Alaotra-Mangoro	Plateau Malagasy
Bezanozano	Alaotra-Mangoro	Plateau Malagasy
Betsileo	Amoron'i Mania; Haute Matsiatra	Plateau Malagasy
Southern Betsimisaraka	Atsinanana; Vatovavy	Southern Betsimisaraka
Antambahoaka	Vatovavy	Plateau Malagasy
Tanala	Fitovinany; Vatovavy	Plateau Malagasy
Antemoro	Fitovinany; Vatovavy	Plateau Malagasy
Antefasy	Atsimo Atsinanana	Plateau Malagasy
Antesaka	Atsimo Atsinanana	Antesaka
Sahafatra	Atsimo Atsinanana	Sahafatra

== Characteristics ==
The Central-Eastern Malagasy dialects are considered among the closest to the Merina-based standard and display several phonological and morphological traits that distinguish them from both Southern and Northern Malagasy varieties..

Comparison
Gloss	Standard Malagasy (Merina)		Sihanaka		Bezanozano		Vakinankaratra		Betsileo		Antambahoaka		Tanala		Antemoro		Antefasy		Sahafatra		Southern Betsimisaraka			Antesaka	
	Form 1	Form 2	Form 1	Form 2	Form 1	Form 2	Form 1	Form 2	Form 1	Form 2	Form 1	Form 2	Form 1	Form 2	Form 1	Form 2	Form 1	Form 2	Form 1	Form 2	Form 1	Form 2	Form 3	Form 1	Form 2
I	Izaho	aho	Izaho		Izaho	aho	A	aako	Aho		Iaho	aho	Iaho		Iaho		Iaho		Iaho		Izaho	aho		Iaho	
the	Ny	Ilay	Ny	Ilay	Ny	Ilay	Ny	Ilay	Ny	Ilay	Gny		Gny		Gny		Gne	e	Gne	e	Ny		Gne	e	
Here	Eto		Aketo		Eto		Eto		Eto		Etoa		Etoa		Etoa		Etoa		Etoa		Aketo			Etoa	
Where	Aiza		Aiza		Aiza		Aia	Aiza	Aia	Aiza	Aiza		Aiza		Aia		Aia		Aia		Akeza	Eza		Aia	
That	dia	Izany	dia	Izany	dia	Izany	dia	Izany	dia	Izany	da	Izany	da	Izany	da	Izany	da	Izany	da	Ezany	die	Izany	Zegny	da	Izà
This	Ity		Ity		Ity		Ity	Itikatry	Ity		Ity	Itiky	Ity	Itiky	Ity	Itiky	Ity	Itiky	Ity	Itiky	Ity			Ity	
Family	Fianakaviana		Fianakaviagna		Fianakaviana		Fianakavena		Fianakavena		Fianakavegna		Fianakavegna		Fianakaviagny		Fianakaviagny		Fianakavia		Fianakavegna			Fianakavia	
To listen	Mihaino		Mitaino		Mihaino		Mihaino		Mihaino		Miheno		Miheno		Miheno		Miheno	Miteno	Miteno		Miteno		Miteno		

One defining feature is the preservation of the final endings-na, -gna, and -gny. Nouns and adjectives generally retain these endings, unlike Southern dialects where they are frequently omitted. Examples include aina / aigna / aigny (life), lena / legna / legny (wet), and taona / taogna / taogny (year), which correspond to the Southern forms ay, le, and tao. The same tendency occurs in verbs: mitaraina (to complain) remains fully realized, whereas Southern speech typically shows mitaray.

The consonant d is also preserved, while Southern dialects commonly reflect the equivalent sound as l (except when preceded by a nasal). Central-Eastern forms such as ady (war), mody (to return), and atody (egg) contrast with Southern equivalents aly, moly, and atoly.

Words ending in -tra or -try generally retain this ending in Central-Eastern dialects, whereas Southern varieties often show -tsy or -tse. Examples include tratra (achieved), zatra (accustomed), sarotra (difficult), and miakatra (to climb), while Southern speech shows tratsy / tratse, zatsy, sarotry / sarotse, and miakatsy / miakatse.

Central-Eastern Malagasy differs from Northern Malagasy mainly in the pronunciation of the vowel o. In Northern dialects, o often shifts to a mid-rounded vowel, written as ô, similar to the vowel in English 'note'. In Central-Eastern Malagasy, however, o is pronounced like the oo in tool, making it back and fully rounded. Examples include tanora and tanôra (young), mpitondra and mpitôndra (leader), and tolom-bahoka and tôlom-bahôaka (popular uprising).

In some words, Central-Eastern Malagasy keeps the o, while Northern Malagasy changes it to a. For instance, mbola (still, yet) in Central-Eastern Malagasy corresponds to mbala in Northern Malagasy.

Central-Eastern Malagasy also keeps the final -a in nouns and verbs, whereas Northern dialects often change this -a to -o. Examples include moka and môko (mosquito), satroka and satroko (hat), and taona or taogny compared with Northern taogno (year).

Another difference involves the vowel e. In Central-Eastern Malagasy, e remains stable, while in Northern varieties it is usually fronted to i. For example, alefaso aty (send it here) becomes alifasa aty in Northern Malagasy, Fenoy rano ny vera (Fill the glass with water) turns into Finoy rano ny vera.

Finally, Central-Eastern Malagasy retains the final -y in imperatives, as in ataovy mamy (make it sweet), while Northern dialects often reduce it to -a, giving atôva mamy.

A distinctive morphosyntactic feature of Central-Eastern dialects is the restriction on the past morphemes n- / na- / ni-. These markers are avoided with certain common verbs—such as afaka (to succeed), avy (to arrive), tonga (to come), and maty (to be dead)—whereas Northern and Southern dialects freely allow them. In Central-Eastern usage, these verbs appear unchanged, even in past contexts.

Past in words in Southern and Northern Malagasy
#	Gloss	Central-Eastern	Southern	Northern
1	Sarobidy succeeded	Afaka/Afaky i Sarobidy.	Niafaky i Sarobidy.	Nafaka i Sarobidy.
2	The camera is dead	Maty ny/gne/gny camera.	Nimaty gny camera.	Naty ilay camera.
3	My wife Abir arrived yesterday	Avy omaly i Abir vadiko.	Niavy lomaly i Abir valiko.	Navy nomaly Abir vadinakahy.

The austral part of Central-Eastern dialects share similarities with Southern Malagasy varieties. For instance, the Sahafatra–Antesaka group and Southern Betsileo occasionally omit the final suffixes -na or -gn, reflecting Southern patterns. This omission exist but rare in other southeastern dialects, as seen in words like oro (nose), sofy (ear), and tagna (hand).

Betsileo is influenced by proximity to Bara and Sakalava areas and is the only Central-Eastern dialect that regularly replaces final -tra with -ts. Examples include mamokatsa (to produce) versus Bara mamokatsy, mitifitsa (to shoot) versus Bara mitifitsy, and mangalatsa (to steal) versus Bara mangalatsy.

Comparative Vocabulary between Southern Malagasic (Bara, Tandroy ) , and Central-Eastern (Antefasy,Merina)
#	Gloss	Bara	Tandroy	Antefasy	Merina (Standard Malagasy)
1	Father	Aba	Ray	Aba	Dada
2	Only	avao	Avao	avao	ihany
3	Yes	Eka	Eka	Eka	Eny
4	Mother	Endry	Rene	Endry	Neny
5	I	Iaho	Zaho	Iaho	Izaho
6	Tamarind	Kily	Kily	Kily	Voamadilo
7	If	Laha	Lehe	Laha/Raha	Raha
8	Mortar	Leo	Leo	Leogny	Laona
9	To call	Mangaiky	Mitoka	Mangaiky/Miantso	Miantso
10	Knife	Mesa	Meso	Amesa/Antsy	Antsy
11	Pumpkin	Taboara	Taboara	Taboara	Voatavo
12	To complain	Mitretre	Mitaray	Mitretre/Mitaraigny	Mitaraina
13	Belly	Troky	Troke	Troky/Kibo	Kibo
14	Orange (fruit)	Voangy	Voange	Voangy/Voasary	Voasary
15	Hungry	Mosare	Mosare	Mosaregny	Noana
16	Near	Mariny	Marine	Mariny/Akaiky	Akaiky
17	We	Ahay	Zahay	Ahay/Ihay	Izahay
18	Who	Ia	Ia	Ia	Iza
19	Where	Aia	aia	Aia	Aiza
20	To watch / look at	Manenty	manente	Magnety / Mijery / Mitaragny	Mijery
21	Crazy / mad	Maola	maola	Mola / Adala	Adala
22	Bone	Taola	Taola	Tola / Tolagny	Taolana
23	Chameleon	Ta	Ta	Atagny	Tana
24	To pound	Mandisa	mandisa	Mandisagny	Manoto
25	Basket	Haro	haro	Haro	Harona
26	Ear	Sofy	Sofy	Sofy	Sofina
27	Woman	Ampela	Ampela	Viavy	Vehivavy
28	Astonished	Serika	Daba	Gaga	Gaga
29	Nose	Oro	Oro	Oro	orona
30	Wind	Tioka	Tioky	Rivotry	Rivotra
31	Frog	Boketra	Saho	Boketra	Sahona
32	Money	Drala	Drala	Vola	Vola
33	Cheek	Fify	Fify	Fify	Takolaka
34	Plate	Finga	Finga	Lasety	Lovia
35	Silence	Mangiky !	Misine	Misigna	Mangina
36	Blind	Goa	Goa	Jamba	Jamba
37	Mirror	Hetsoro	Hetsoro	Fitaratry	Fitaratra
38	Girl	Japela	Ajapela	Zaviavy	Zazavavy
39	To come down	Mijotso	Mijotso	Mijetsy / Midigny	Midina
40	Thin	Matify	Matify	Manify	Manify
41	Dark	Maizy	Maize	Mizigny	Maizina
42	Pepper	Pimay	Pimay	Sakay	Sakay
43	Leg	Randro	Randro	Randro	Ranjo
44	To damage	Mamilavila	Mijoy	Mamilavila / Manimba	Manimba
45	Ant	Vitika	Vitike	Vitsiky	Vitsika

Other Central-Eastern dialects exhibit similarities with Northern Malagasy varieties. For example, Sihanaka shares identical forms with Northern Tsimihety for certain words, including Voalôhany (first) and Mpagnazary (prophet). Other forms show minor variation while remaining closely related, such as Ôlona in Sihanaka versus Ôlogno in Tsimihety (people), and Sabô versus Sabôha (sword). Southern Betsimisaraka aligns with Tsimihety in several lexical items. Silaona (starvation) appears in both Southern Betsimisaraka and Sihanaka, while Northern Tsimihety uses Silagno. The verb Mamaitra (to give) in Southern Betsimisaraka corresponds to Mamaitry in Tsimihety, and Kamarady (friend) in Southern Betsimisaraka aligns with Komarady in Tsimihety.

Comparison of Central-Eastern (Sihanaka, Southern Betsimisaraka) and Northern Malagasic (Tsimihety)
#	Gloss	Sihanaka	Southern Betsimisaraka	Tsimihety
1	First	Voalognane	Voalôhany	Voalôhany
2	People	Ôlona	Olona	Ôlogno
3	Both	Samby	Samby	Samby
4	For / To	Mbô	Mbarase	Mboa
5	Him/Her	Ananjy	Ananjy	Azy
6	His name	Agnarany	Agnarane	Agnaragnanazy
7	Eldest son	Lahimatoa	Talagnolahy	Talagnôlo lalahy
8	Two	Roa	Roe	Aroy
9	Called	Antsovina	–	Antsôvigny
10	Them	Anjareo	Anjareo	Zare
11	Sword	Sabô	Sabatra	Sabôha
12	One	Iraika	Raika	Araiky
13	Prophet	Mpagnazary	Ampaminany	Mpagnazary
14	Twelve	Roa ambin'ny folo	Roe Amby folo	Aroy ambin'ny fôlo
15	When	Rehefa	Ndreka	Izy koa efa
16	In the middle of teachers	ampovoan'ny mpampianatra	Agnivona mpampianatra	Agnivon'ny ampagnanatra
17	To listen	mitaino	miteno	mitandregny
18	To be amazed	midagnàka	Magnana	midagnàka
19	His response	Famaleny	Valintenine	Famaliany
20	To look for	mikaraka	miaragna	Mitsakaraka
21	Man	Lehilahy	Lalahy	Lilahy
22	Give me	Ameo anahy	Ameo anahy	Ameo Zaho
23	Starvation	Silaona	Silaona	Silagno
24	To run	Mihazakazaka	Mihazakazaka	Milomay
25	Good / Beautiful	Tsara	Tsara	Tsara
26	Bring here	Ndeso aty	Andosy aty	Ndeso atôy
27	Alive	Velona	Velona	Velogno
28	Dead	Maty	Maty	Naty
29	To Call	Magnantso	Magnantso	Magnantso
30	Cattle	Aomby	Aomby	Aomby
31	Friend	Namana	Kamarady	Komarady
32	Prostitute	Mpivarontena	Makorelina	Makorely
33	Sterile	Momba	Momba	Kanda
34	Afraid / Scared	Matahotra	Matahotra	Matahotro
35	To give	Miteraka	Mamaitra	Mamaitry
36	Wine	Divay	Divaigna	Divaigny
37	Ready	Vognona	Vognona	Vôgnogno
38	To wait	Mandigny	Mandigny	Mandigny
39	In his house	Tan-dragnony	Tan-dragnony	Tan-tragnonazy
40	Up / High	Agnambo	Agnambo	Agnambo
41	Descent	Tarika	Taranaka	Tamingana
42	Pregnant	Bevohoka	Bevohoka	Bikibo
43	My heart	Foko	Foko	Fônahy
44	Us	Antsika	Antsena	Atsika
45	Dark	Maizigna	Mizigna	Maizigny
46	Fire	Afo	Afo	Môtro
47	Holy Spirit	Fagnahy Masina	Fagnahy Masina	Fagnahy Masigny
48	Only	Foagna	Foagna	Foagna
49	Really	Tokoatrany	Tokoatra	–
50	Outside	An-Tokon tany	Atany	Itany

Demonstrative prefixes such as tak- and ak- are still used in central-eastern dialects like Sihanaka and Southern Betsimisaraka, are found in Northern Malagasic group, notable Tsimihety and Northern Betsimisaraka.In contrast, the Merina dialect has lost these prefixes. A remnant of the prefix ak- is still found in the verb for "to go to" in Merina, as in mankany. The prefix ak- is also occasionally used in the Vakinankaratra to indicate direction, as in Any avaratra akany, meaning "to the north." A remnant of the prefix ak- is also found in the Antaifasy dialect when referring to a high place, as in akaboagny, which corresponds to the Merina ambony.

Demonstrative Forms Common to Sihanaka, Northern Malagasy dialects, and Southern Betsimisaraka
Gloss	Central-Eastern Malagasic			Northern Malagasic	
Gloss	Without prefix	With prefix		With prefix	
Gloss	Merina	Sihanaka	Southern Betsimisaraka	Northern Betsimisaraka	Tsimihety
In (present moment)	ato	akato	akato	akato	akato
In (past moment)	tato	takato	takato	takato	takato
In (general location)	ao	akao	akao	akao	akao
On (surface)	eo	akeo	akeo	akeo	akeo
Here	eto	aketo	aketo	aketo	aketo
There (general location)	any	akagny	akagny	akagny	akagny
There (past location)	tany	takagny	takagny	takagny	takagny
There (recently passed spot)	teo	takeo	takeo	takeo	takeo
Then (after that moment)	avy eo	avy akeo	avy akeo	avy akeo	avy akeo

== Cultural importance ==
The Merina dialect, part of the Central-Eastern group and spoken in and around Antananarivo, forms the basis of Standard Malagasy, the variety used in education, the media, administrative documents, and in liturgy.

== See also ==
- Malagasy language
- Languages of Madagascar

== Bibliography ==
- "Antefasy Bible Translation App – Wycliffe". Google Play Store.
- "Betsimisaraka Atsimo Bible Translation App – Wycliffe". Google Play Store.
- "Baiboly Antemoro – Wycliffe". Google Play Store.
- "Sihanaka Bible Translation App – Wycliffe". Google Play Store.
- "Tsimihety Bible Translation App – Wycliffe". Google Play Store.
- "Betsileo Bible Translation App – Wycliffe". Google Play Store.
- "Jensenius, Ole. 1910. *Dictionnaire Bara-Hova*". Scribd.
- "Lexique français-Antandroy – Raymond Decary". Scribd.
