= Kingdom of Isandra =

Betsileo kingdom in Madagascar

Kingdom of Isandra Fanjakan'Isandra (Malagasy)
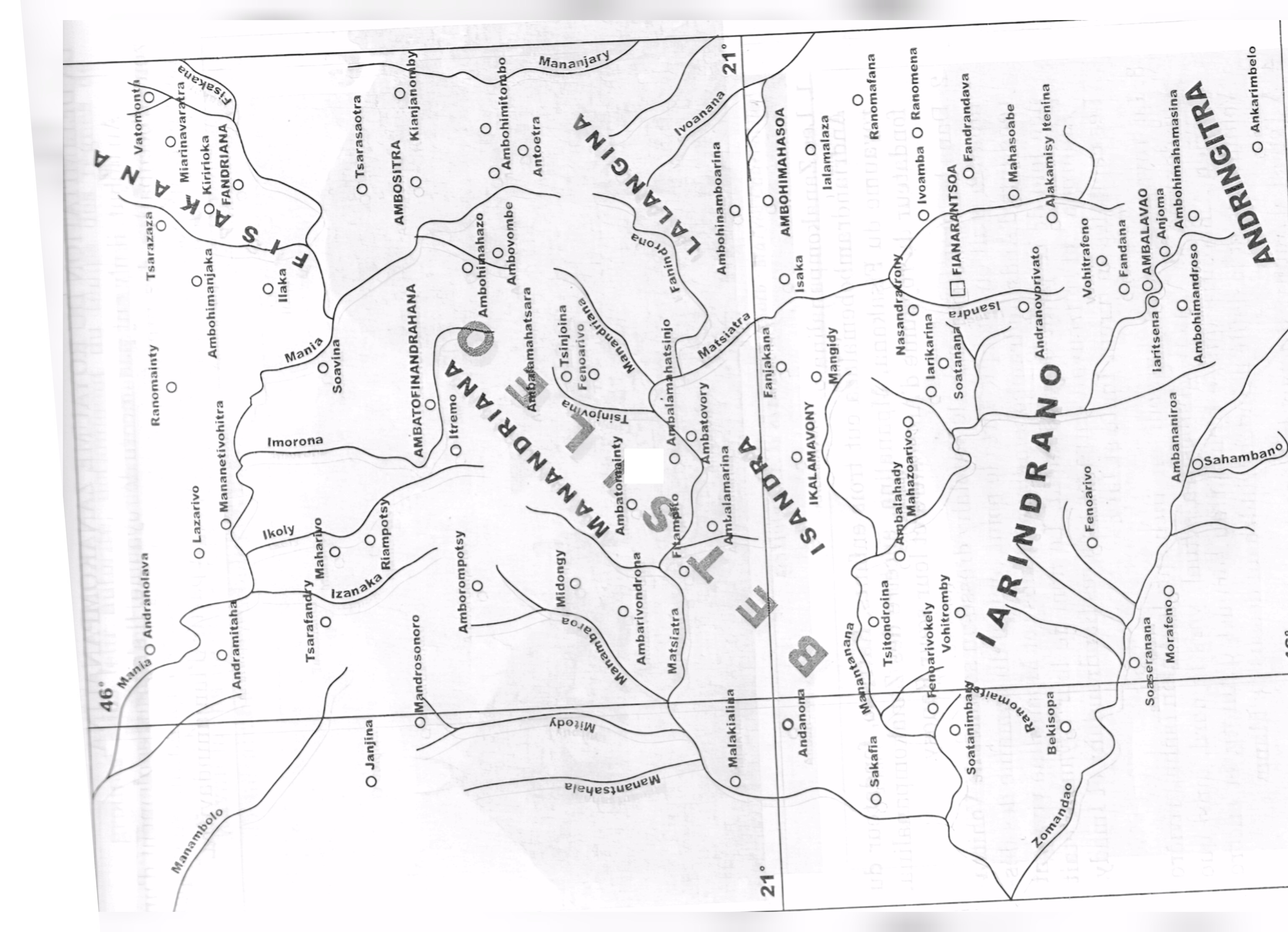
- Kingdom of Isandra named after the Isandra River near Fianarantsoa, visible on the map.
- Capital: Mahazoarivo
- Common languages: Betsileo
- Religion: Traditional beliefs
- Government: Absolute monarchy
- Historical era: Pre-colonial
  - Foundation: Late 1600s
  - Annexation into Imerina kingdom: Early 1800s
Succeeded by
Merina kingdom
- Today part of: Madagascar

Isandra is the most powerful of all Betsileo kingdoms. It is named after the Isandra river.

== History ==
The kingdom of Isandra was founded by Ralambo,the grandson of Andrianantara I of Manandriana. Andriamanalina I conquered the Lalangina and Vohibato into Isandra. Trade with European traders via the port of Toliara flourished the kingdom of Isandra during his reign. His son Andriamanalina II lost territory after his death and only Isandra proper remained. The last ruler of Isandra Andriamanalina III submitted without a fight to the Hova ruler Andrianampoinimerina.

== Location ==
It is found mostly in the modern are of Isandra district.
