= Isandra =

Madagascar geological formation

Cliffs & Caves of Isandra
- Zoma d'Isandra

The Caves and Cliffs of Isandra (locally called: Zoma d'Isandra) are located in the Isandra (district) in the Betsileo cultural region of Madagascar, roughly 30 km to the northwest of the regional capital of Fianarantsoa.

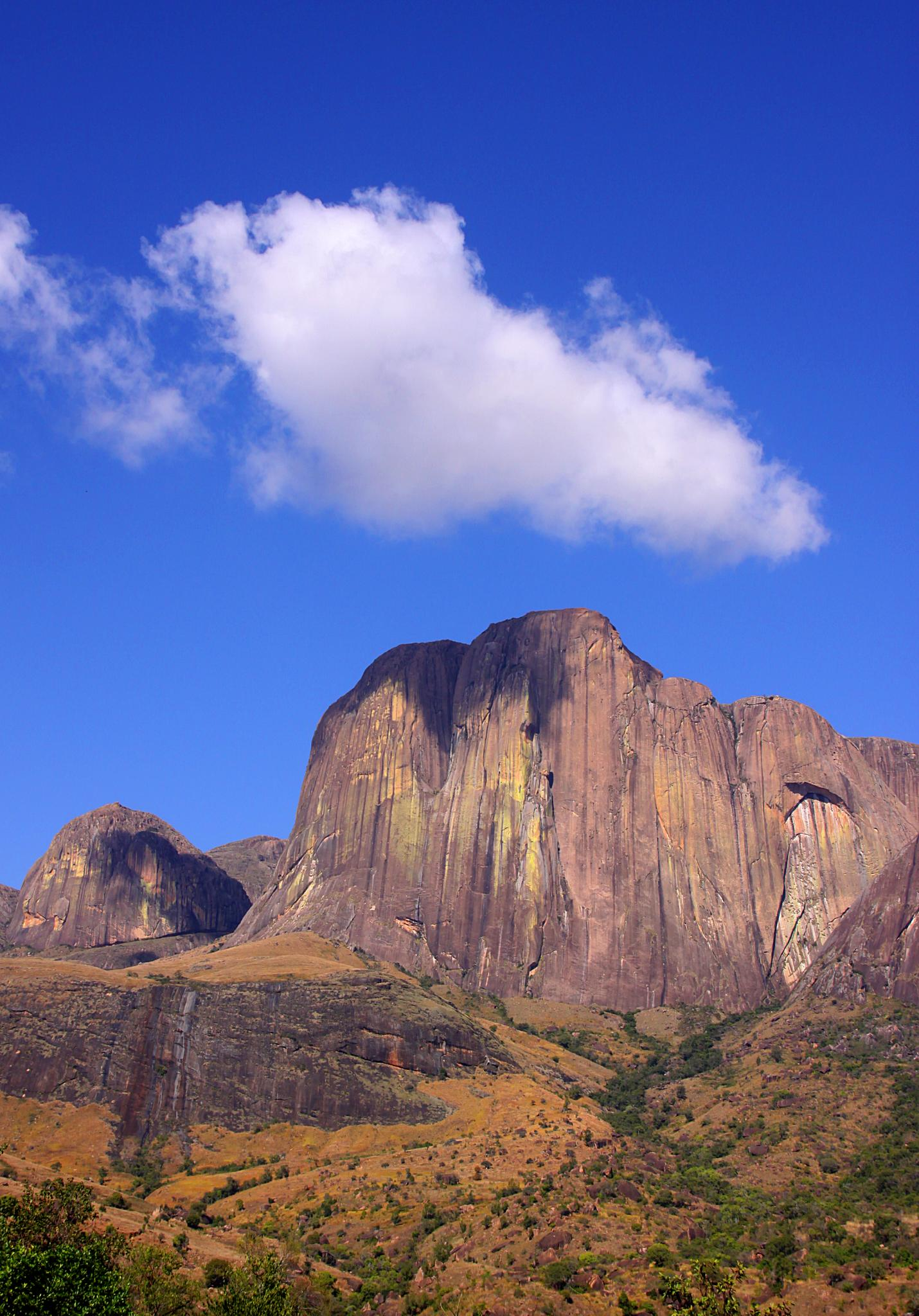
Cliff at Isandra

== Site description ==
The site consists of a large granite north–south cliff face, which has been eroded over millions of years. Through landslides, granite blocks pile up at the base of the cliffs and create open spaces or "caves". During the 17th and 18th centuries, owing to the defensive possibilities created by the caves and heavy rocks, inhabitants occupied many of the caves and fortified them with walls of stone and mortar.

== World Heritage status ==
This site was added to the Tentative List of UNESCO World Heritage Sites in Madagascar on November 14, 1997, in the Mixed (Cultural + Natural) category.

== See also ==
- Kingdom of Isandra
