= Talata =

Talata may refer to:

- Talata Embalo (born 1963), Guinea-Bissauan amateur wrestler
- Talata Ampano, a town and commune in Madagascar
- Talata Mafara, a Local Government Area in Zamfara State, Nigeria
- Talata Vohimena, a town and commune in Madagascar

== See also ==
- Thalatha, a genus of moths
