= Sihanaka dialect =

Austronesian language of Madagascar

Sihanaka
- Native to: Madagascar
- Ethnicity: Sihanaka
- Native speakers: 695,000
- Language family: Austronesian: Malayo-Polynesian; Western Indonesian; Barito; East Barito; Central-Eastern Malagasic; Plateau Malagasy; Sihanaka
- Writing system: Latin script (Malagasy alphabet)

Language codes
- ISO 639-1: mg
- ISO 639-3: plt
- Glottolog: siha1244
- Linguasphere: 31-LDA-ab
- Sihanaka language sample 1 A woman reading gospel in the Sihanaka dialect. Sihanaka language sample 2 Another recording of a woman reading gospel in the Sihanaka dialect. Sihanaka language sample 3 A third gospel reading by a woman in the Sihanaka dialect.

Sihanaka is a dialect of Malagasy spoken by Sihanaka people in the region of Lake Alaotra.

== Classification ==
Sihanaka is an austronesian language part of Central-Eastern Malagasic and part of the Plateau branch of Malagasy language along with Merina, Antefasy, Antemoro, Tanala and Betsileo.

== Characteristics ==
The Sihanaka dialect is considered an older form of Merina, retaining broader and more provincial features. While largely intelligible with Merina, it preserves vocabulary now obsolete in Imerina, such as mivony ("to hide") and manjary ("beautiful" or "proper").

Demonstrative prefixes like tak- and ak- are still used in Sihanaka, as in other dialects of the Northern Malagasy group (e.g., Tsimihety, Northern Betsimisaraka), as well as in Southern Betsimisaraka. In contrast, Merina has lost these prefixes.

Sihanaka also shares the word agnambo for "up / above" with Tsimihety, Northern Betsimisaraka, and Southern Betsimisaraka, while Merina uses ambony.

Demonstrative Forms Common to Sihanaka, Northern Malagasy dialects, and Southern Betsimisaraka
Gloss	Central-Eastern Malagasic			Northern Malagasic	
Gloss	Without prefix	With prefix		With prefix	
Gloss	Merina	Sihanaka	Southern Betsimisaraka	Northern Betsimisaraka	Tsimihety
In (present moment)	ato	akato	akato	akato	akato
In (past moment)	tato	takato	takato	takato	takato
In (general location)	ao	akao	akao	akao	akao
On (surface)	eo	akeo	akeo	akeo	akeo
Here	eto	aketo	aketo	aketo	aketo
There (general location)	any	akagny	akagny	akagny	akagny
There (past location)	tany	takagny	takagny	takagny	takagny
There (recently passed spot)	teo	takeo	takeo	takeo	takeo
Then (after that moment)	avy eo	avy akeo	avy akeo	avy akeo	avy akeo
Spatial Lexicon
Up / above	ambony	agnambo	agnambo	agnambo	agnambo

== Territorial Range ==
In the Alaotra-Mangoro Region of Madagascar, the Sihanaka dialect is chiefly spoken within three districts — Ambatondrazaka District, Amparafaravola District, and Andilamena District — which together form the historical heartland of the Sihanaka people. It is also the most commonly spoken dialect in the city of Ambatondrazaka.

== Vocabulary ==
Sihanaka Vocabulary with Gloss and Standard Malagasy
#	Gloss	Standard Malagasy	Sihanaka
Numbers & Pronouns
1	One	Iray	Raika
2	Him / His	Azy	Ananzy
3	They / Them	Ireo / Zareo	Zareo
People & Identity
4	Woman / Girl	Vehivavy	Viavy
5	His name	Anarany	Agnarany
6	We call her Hasinah	Hasinah no iantsoana azy	Hasinah agnantsonvangnan'azy
Nature & Food
7	Mango	Manga	Voamanga
8	Sweet potato	Voamanga	Tsimanga
9	Papaya	Papay	Mampazo
10	Pineapple	Mananasy	Manasy
11	Goyava	Goavy	Gavo
Objects & Qualities
12	Thing	Zavatra	Ràha
13	Quality / Personality	Toetra	Toatra
14	Huge	Ngezabe	Gedabe
Space & Place
15	Here	Eto	Aketo
16	There	Eo	Akeo
17	In	Ao	Akao
18	In / Inside	Anaty	Agnaty
19	Above	Ambony	Agnambo
20	In the house	Ao an-trano	An-dragno
Time & Frequency
21	Always	Foana	Foagna
22	Then	Avy eo	Avy takeo
23	Till when	Hatramin'oviana	Katram'oviana
Questions
24	What	Inona	Ino
25	How	Ahoana	Anakôry
Actions
26	To hear	Maheno	Maregny
27	Don’t fear	Aza matahotra	Aza matahatra
