= Nasandratrony =

- Location in Madagascar
- Coordinates: 21°43′S 46°56′E
- Country: Madagascar
- Region: Haute Matsiatra
- District: Isandra

Area
  - Total: 52.52 km^{2} (20.28 sq mi)
- Elevation: 1,292 m (4,239 ft)

Population (2001)
  - Total: 8,000
- Time zone: UTC3 (EAT)
- Postal code: 314

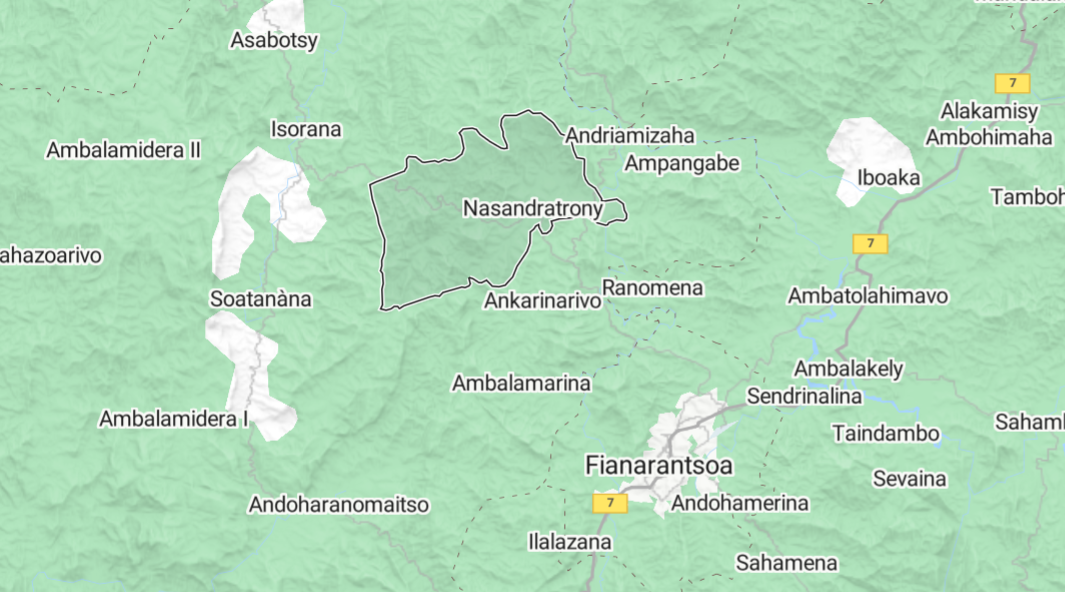

Nasandratrony is a rural municipality in Madagascar.

It belongs to the district of Isandra, which is a part of Haute Matsiatra Region. The population of the commune was estimated to be approximately 8,000 in 2001 commune census.

Primary and junior level secondary education are available in town. The majority 90% of the population of the commune are farmers, while an additional 5% receives their livelihood from raising livestock. The most important crop is rice, while other important products are maize and cassava. Services provide employment for 4% of the population. Additionally fishing employs 1% of the population.
