= Thalatha =

Scientific classification
- Kingdom: Animalia
- Phylum: Arthropoda
- Class: Insecta
- Order: Lepidoptera
- Superfamily: Noctuoidea
- Family: Noctuidae
- Subfamily: Acronictinae
- Genus: Thalatha; Walker, 1862

Synonyms
- Molvena Walker, [1866]; Macroprora Turner, 1941; Conocrana Turner, 1942

Genus of moths

Thalatha is a genus of moths of the family Noctuidae. The genus was erected by Francis Walker in 1862.

== Species ==
- Thalatha argentea Warren, 1912 New Guinea
- Thalatha artificiosa Turner, 1936 Queensland
- Thalatha bryochlora (Meyrick, 1897) Tasmania, New South Wales
- Thalatha caledonica (Holloway, 1979) New Caledonia
- Thalatha chionobola (Turner, 1941) Queensland
- Thalatha costigma (Turner, 1929) Western Australia
- Thalatha dinawa (Bethune-Baker, 1906) New Guinea
- Thalatha ekeikei (Bethune-Baker, 1906) New Guinea
- Thalatha guttalis (Walker, [1866]) Queensland
- Thalatha japonica Sugi, 1982 Japan
- Thalatha kebeae (Bethune-Baker, 1906) New Guinea
- Thalatha melanophrica Turner, 1922 Queensland
- Thalatha melanostrota Hampson, 1916 Somalia
- Thalatha occidens Hampson, 1911 southern Nigeria
- Thalatha sinens (Walker, 1857) India, Myanmar, Borneo
- Thalatha symprepes (Turner, 1933) Queensland
- Thalatha trichromoides (Poole, 1989) New South Wales

== See also ==
- Talata (disambiguation)
