= Andakatany =

Coordinates: 20.1°S 46.4°E

- Interactive map of Andakatany
- Country: Madagascar
- Region: Amoron'i Mania
- District: Manandriana

Population (2001)
  - Total: 4,000
- Time zone: UTC3 (EAT)

Andakatany is a town and commune in Madagascar. It belongs to the district of Manandriana, which is a part of Amoron'i Mania Region. The population of the commune was estimated to be approximately 4,000 in 2001 commune census.

Only primary schooling is available. Farming and raising livestock provides employment for 49.5% and 49.5% of the working population. The most important crops are rice and beans, while other important agricultural products are peanuts and maize. Services provide employment for 1% of the population.
