= Ambohipo =

- Location in Madagascar
- Coordinates: 20°51′S 47°1′E
- Country: Madagascar
- Region: Amoron'i Mania
- District: Manandriana
- Elevation: 1,239 m (4,065 ft)

Population (2001)
  - Total: 4,000
- Time zone: UTC3 (EAT)

Ambohipo is a town and commune in Madagascar. It belongs to the district of Manandriana, which is a part of Amoron'i Mania Region. The population of the commune was estimated to be approximately 4,000 in 2001 commune census.

Primary and junior level secondary education are available in town. Farming and raising livestock provides employment for 49.75% and 49.75% of the working population. The most important crops are cassava and beans, while other important agricultural products are peanuts, maize and rice. Services provide employment for 0.5% of the population.
