= Ambohimilanja, Manandriana =

Ambohimilanja
- Location in Madagascar
- Coordinates: 20°42′S 47°1′E
- Country: Madagascar
- Region: Amoron'i Mania
- District: Manandriana
- Elevation: 1,525 m (5,003 ft)

Population (2001)
  - Total: 6,000
- Time zone: UTC3 (EAT)

Ambohimilanja is a town and commune within the district of Manandriana, in the region of Amoron'i Mania, Madagascar. The population of the commune was estimated to be approximately 6,000 in the 2001 commune census.

Only primary schooling is available. Farming and raising livestock provides employment for 48.5% and 48.5% of the working population. The most important crop is rice, while other important products are maize and sweet potatoes. Services provide employment for 3% of the population.
