= Kingdom of Lalangina =

Betsileo kingdom in Madagascar

Kingdom of Lalangina Fanjakan’i Lalangina (Malagasy)
- c. 1600s–1895
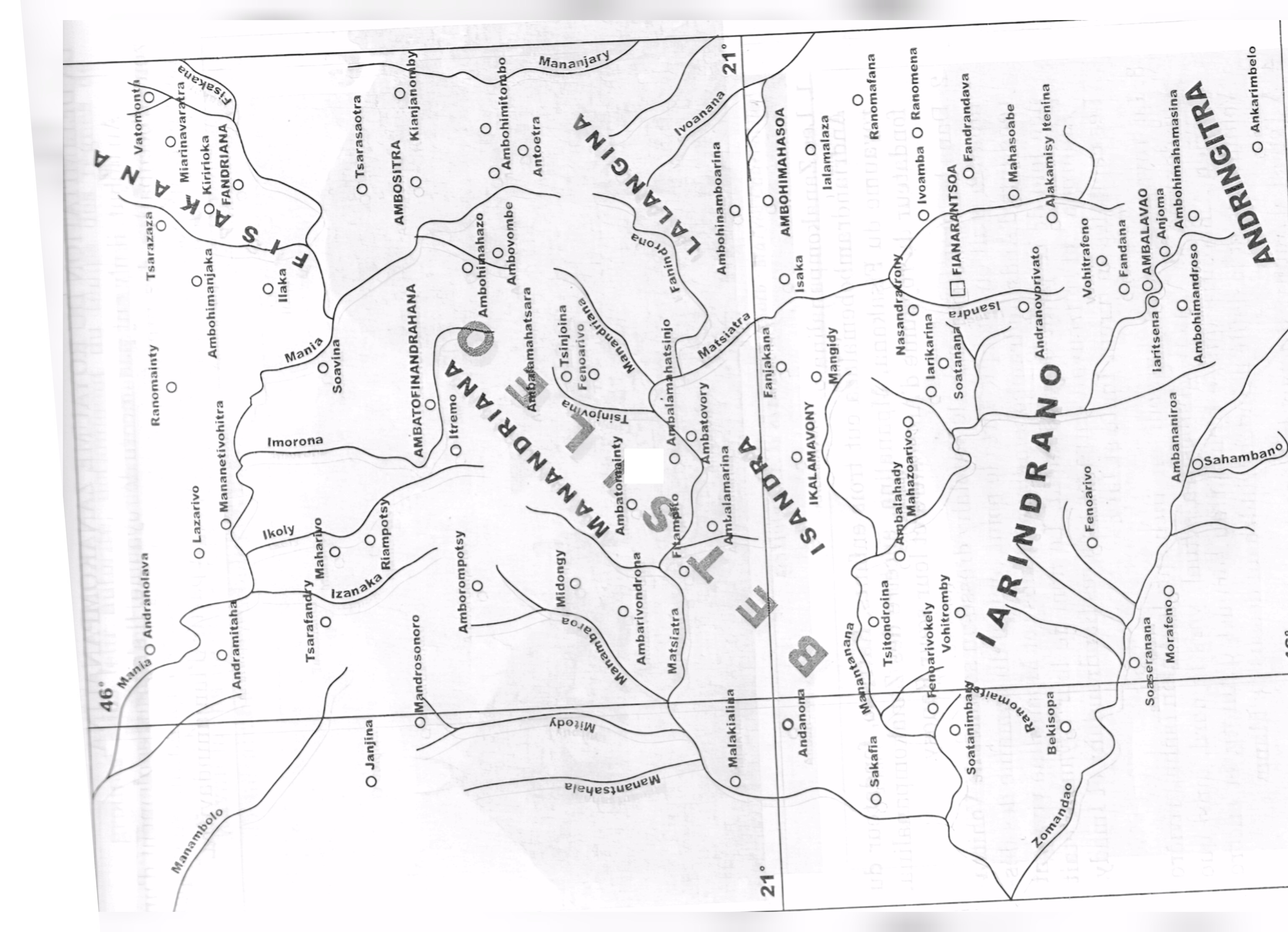
- Lalangina is south, between Ambositra and Ranomafana.
- Capital: Mitongoa
- Common languages: Betsileo
- Religion: Traditional beliefs Christianism
- Government: Absolute monarchy
- Historical era: Pre-colonial
  - Foundation: c. 1600s
  - Colonial conquest: 1895
Succeeded by
Merina Kingdom; French Madagascar
- Today part of: Madagascar

Lalangina was one of Betsileo kingdoms located in now Lalangina district in Central Madagascar.

== History ==
The kingdom of Lalangina originated in the early 17th century with its first ruler, Rasamboninjato a prince from Imerina. Upon the death of his childless grandson, Lalangina was united with Mango. Rafianarana – Andriampianarana ruled Lalangina independently from Mango. His brother Andrianantara, king of Mango, both ruled Lalangina and Vohibato after Rafianarana's subjects killed his cruel son Andrianonifoloalina. Lalangina and Vohibato split after the death of Andrianantara's grandson Rahasamanarivo. Andrianonindranarivo started the dynasty that ruled Lalangina until the French conquest. King Raonimanalina of Lalangina resisted the merina expansion of Andrianampoinimerina and he was killed in battle. The kingdom was divided among his sons. He was succeeded by his sister Andriambavizanaka who negotiated peace with Andrianampoinimerina making Lalangina a vassal state within Imerina Kingdom.

== Notable rulers ==
- Rasamboninjato (fl. early 1600s)
- Andriamanelatra-Andrianonantatra
- Andriamboloana Rabehaofotsy
- Rafianarana - Andriampianarana
- Andrianonifoloalina
- Andrianantara
- Rahasamanarivo (fl. 1650)
- Andrianonindranarivo
- Raendratsara (Ramaharoarivo I) (fl. 1780s)
- Raonimanalina
- Andriambavizanaka(Queen)
- Reniadalo(Queen)
- Ramaharoarivo II (fl. 1885–1896)

== See also ==
- Betsileo people
- Andrianampoinimerina
- History of Madagascar
