= Andreamalama =

- Location in Madagascar
- Coordinates: 21°26′S 46°48′E
- Country: Madagascar
- Region: Haute Matsiatra
- District: Isandra district

Population (2018)
  - Total: 10,205
- Time zone: UTC3 (EAT)
- Postal code: 314

Andreamalama is a town and commune in Madagascar. It belongs to the Isandra district, which is a part of Haute Matsiatra Region. The population of the commune was 10205 in 2018.

Primary and junior level secondary education are available in town. The majority 95% of the population of the commune are farmers. The most important crops are rice and grapes, while other important agricultural products are beans, cassava and potatoes. Industry and services provide employment for 2% and 3% of the population, respectively.
