= Isandra District =

Isandra (district)
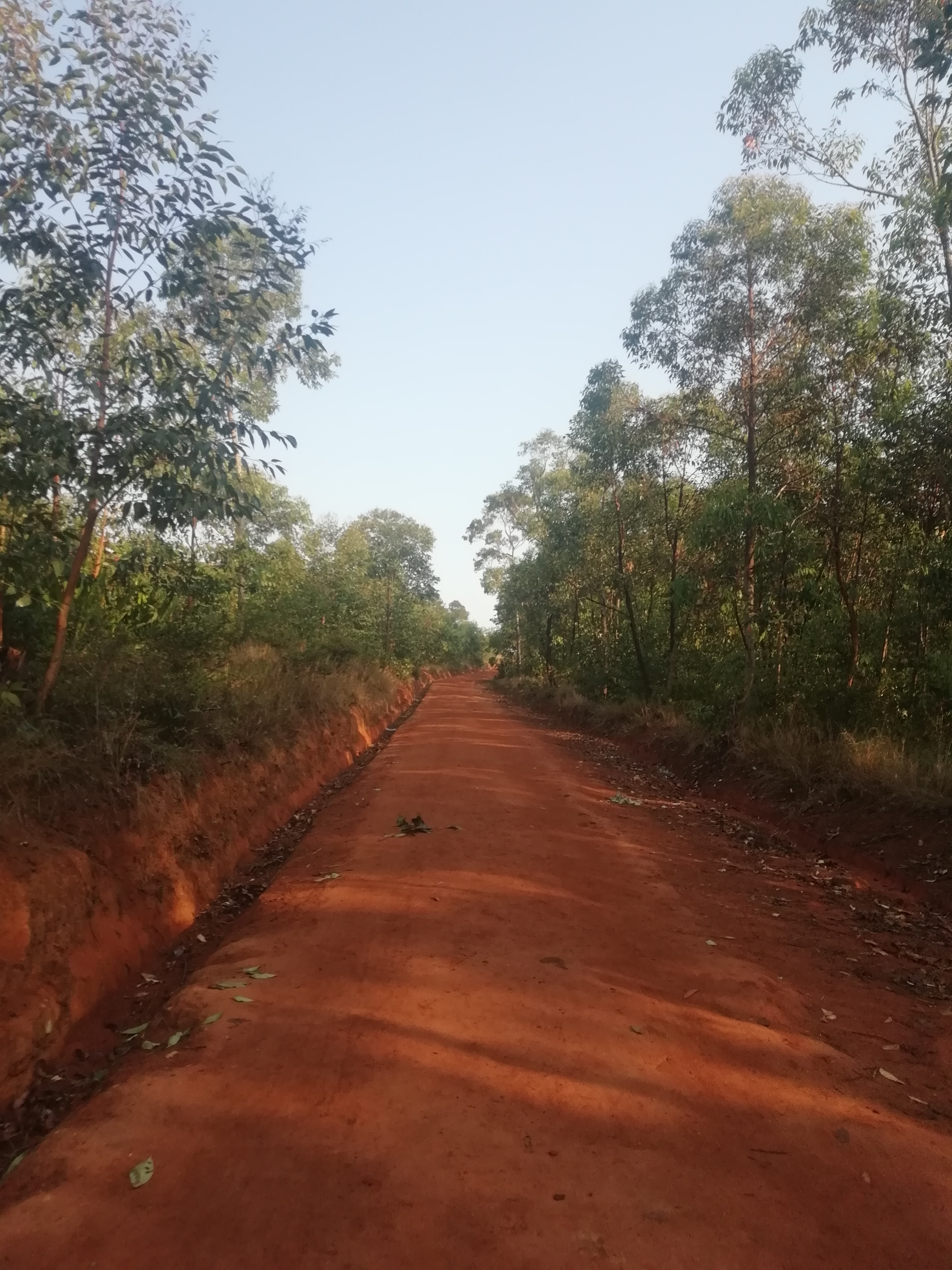
- A secondary road near Isandra

- Location in Madagascar
- Coordinates: 21°19′S 46°56′E
- Country: Madagascar
- Region: Haute Matsiatra
- District: Isandra

Area
  - Total: 1,450 km^{2} (560 sq mi)

Population (2018)
  - Total: 151,056
- Time zone: UTC3 (EAT)
- Postal code: 314

Isandra is a district of Haute Matsiatra in Madagascar.

== Communes ==
The district is further divided into 13 communes:

- Ambalamidera Ambohimanana
- Ambalamidera II
- Ambondrona
- Andoharanomaintso
- Andreamalama
- Anjoma Itsara
- Ankarinarivo Manirisoa
- Fanjakana
- Iavinomby-Vohibola
- Isorana
- Mahazoarivo
- Nasandratrony
- Soatanana

== Roads ==
- National road 42 from Fianarantsoa to Ikalamavony crosses this district.

== See also ==
- Isandra
- Kingdom of Isandra

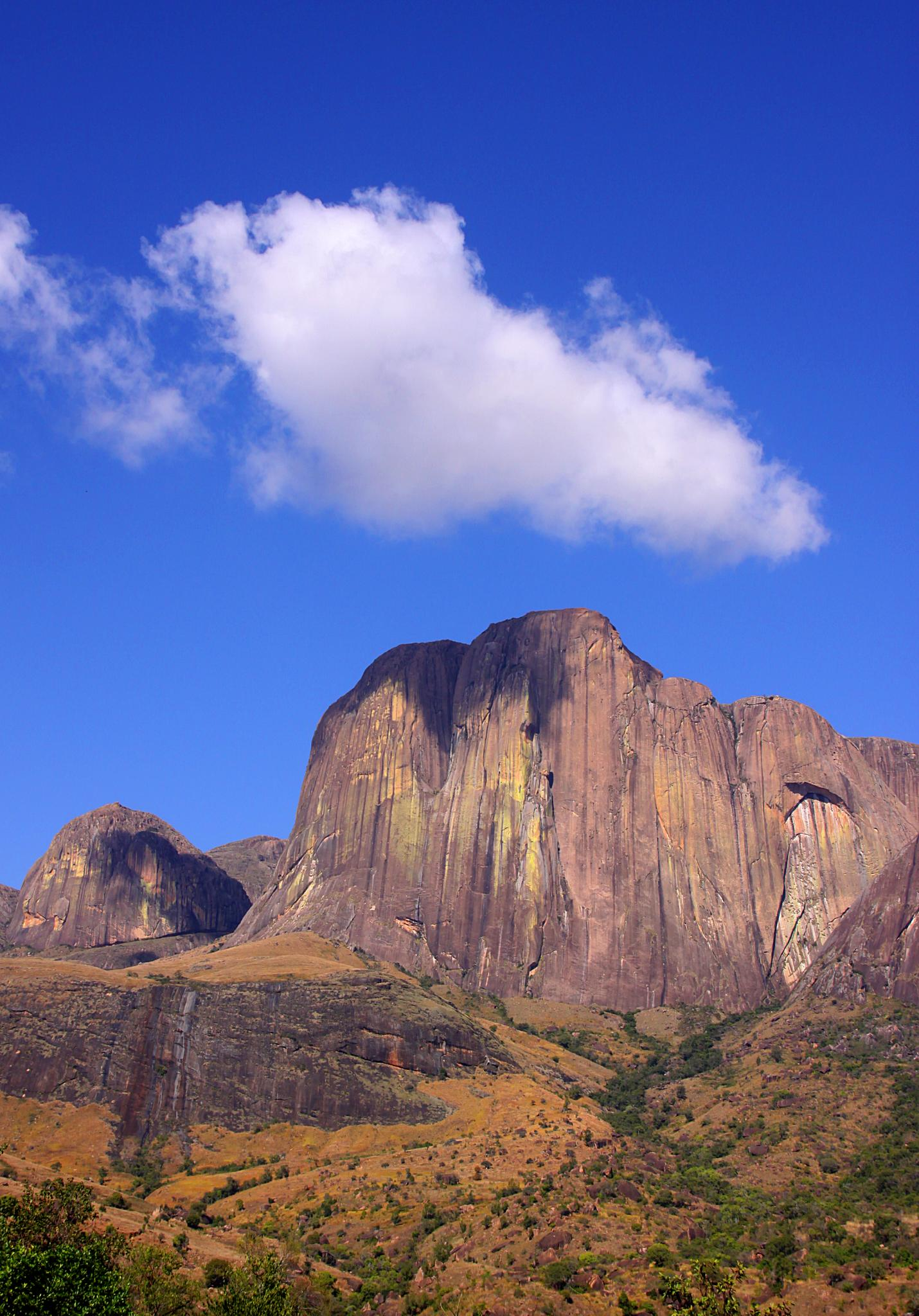
Cliff at Isandra
