= Tsimihety people =

Malagasy ethnic group in Madagascar

- Madagascar, the origins of Tsimihety

Total population
- 1,200,000

Regions with significant populations
- Madagascar

Languages
- Tsimihety

Related ethnic groups
- Betsimisaraka, Bantu peoples, Austronesians

The Tsimihety are a Malagasy ethnic group who are found in the north-central region of Madagascar. Their name means "those who never cut their hair", a behavior likely linked to their independence from Sakalava kingdom, located to their west, where cutting hair at the time of mourning was expected. They are found in mountainous part of the island. They are one of the largest Malagasy ethnic groups and their population estimates range between 700,000 and over 1.2 million. This estimation places them as the fourth-largest ethnicity in Madagascar.

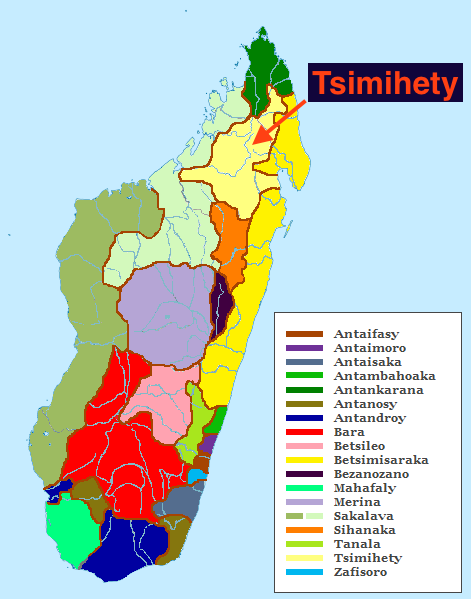
Distribution of Tsimihety people (light yellow in north), compared to other Malagasy ethnic groups. Alternate distribution has been reported by Tofanelli et al.

== Ethnic identity ==
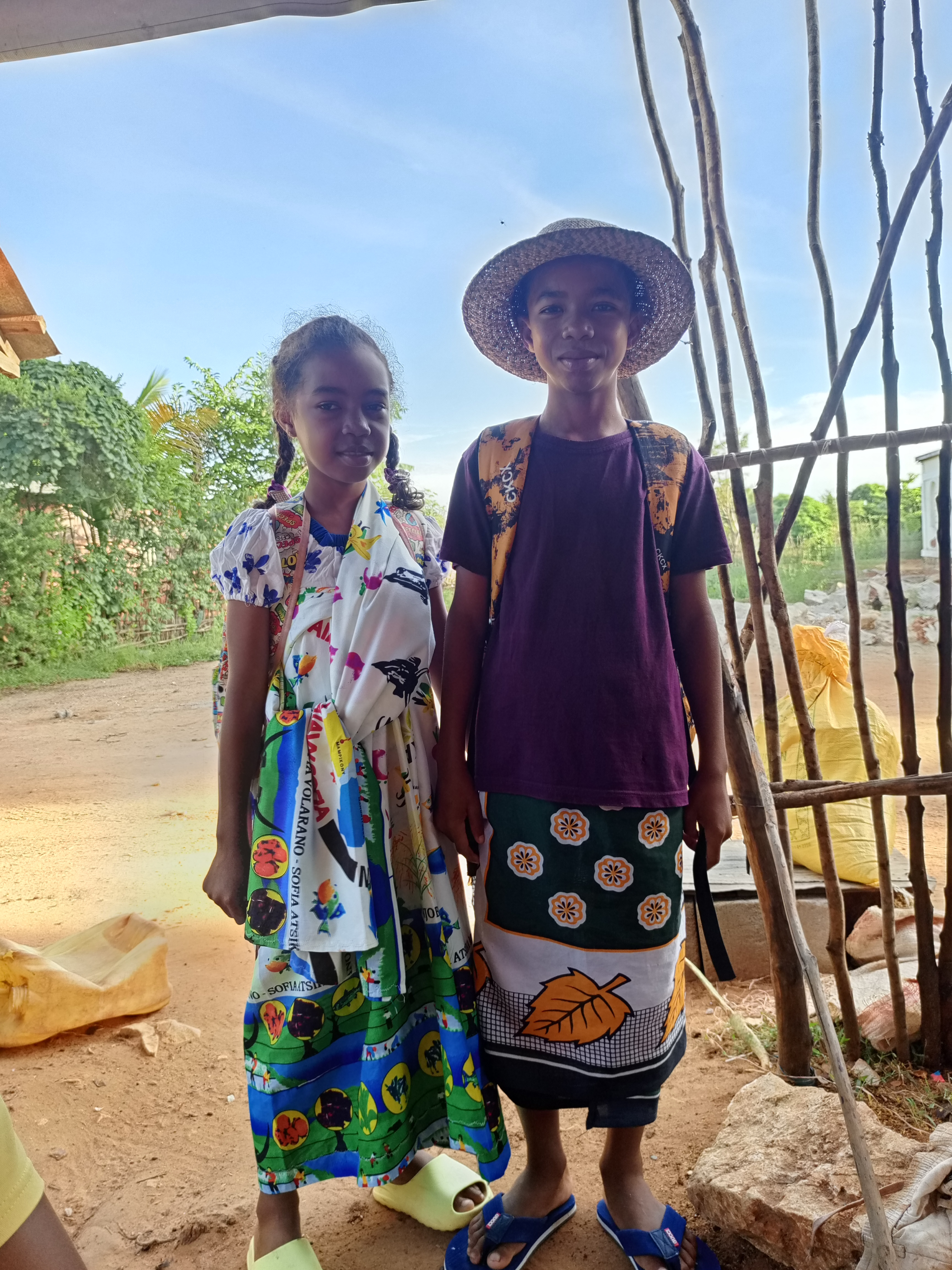
Two Tsimihety individuals

The Tsimihety trace their origins back to the eastern coast, having migrated with their cattle to the Mandritsara plain in the 18th century as leaderless refugees fleeing the slave wars ongoing in their homeland. Soon afterward they accepted the rule of the Volafotsy, a clan associated with the Maroserana who had migrated north from Sakalava territory. Peter Wilson – a professor of Anthropology specializing on Madagascar, states that Tsimihety people do not fit the normal assumptions of anthropologists, for these people "didn't create symbols or rituals or tribal rules" like tribes do, but they can "only be described negatively" by what they didn't and don't do. They are thus not a tribe, because they lack tribal ties, lack social compact and have no hierarchical power structure within the ethnic group. Their relationships are centered around biological family and kin.

== History ==
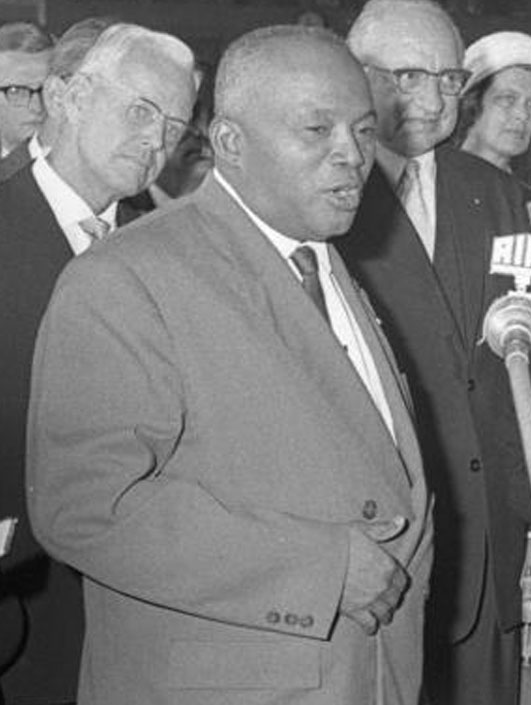
Philibert Tsiranana, from the Tsimihety ethnic group, was the first president of post-colonial era Madagascar.

The anarchist system prevailed among the Tsimihety people before the 19th century. However, in 1823, Radama I, the Merina king, brought the entire island under one rule, including the Tsimihety, and abolished the international slave trade.

The French colonial rule absorbed the Tsimihety in 1896, as a part of French Madagascar. The Tsimihety have been an active part of Madagascar politics ever since. Philibert Tsiranana, a Tsimihety from near Mandritsara, was the first president of the Malagasy Republic, when it became a semi-autonomous region within the French Union in 1959, and remained president for 10 years after it gained independence from France in 1960.

== Society ==
David Graeber, an anthropologist specializing in the study of anarchist systems, states the Tsimihety people exemplify a historic social system that accepted no authority and practiced anarchy:

They [Tsimihety] are marked by resolutely egalitarian social organization and practices. They are, in other words, the anarchists of northwest Madagascar. To this day they have maintained a reputation as masters of evasion: under the French, administrators would complain that they could send delegations to arrange for labor to build a road near a Tsimihety village, negotiate the terms with apparently cooperative elders, and return with the equipment a week later only to discover the village entirely abandoned – every single inhabitant had moved in with some relative in another part of the country.

— David Graeber, Fragments of an Anarchist Anthropology

The Tsimihety represent one of the rare examples where the culture was innately anti-government, where states Graeber, all forms of government had effectively been withdrawn even from countryside and communities. Informal consensus was the basis of local decisions, anyone behaving like a leader was considered suspicious, giving orders was wrong, expecting anyone to be responsible for or would actually do something was wrong, and even concepts such as working for a wage was morally shunned. Graeber states that ultimately, the Tsimihety were "eventually gobbled up by the state", gave up the utopia, as they sought economic opportunities and infrastructure.

=== Family affiliation ===
The Tsimihety people are patrilineal, and kin relationships with the male ancestors and descendants are most important to both men and women. Their cultural conventions require extended exogamy, which coupled with high birth rates have led to their migration and high diffusion among neighboring ethnic groups. The society is also notable for the social roles expected by a Tsimihety family from a maternal uncle.

== Language ==
The language of the Tsimihety people is a dialect of the Malagasy language, a branch of the Malayo-Polynesian language group derived from the Barito languages spoken in the Austronesian region.

== Economy ==
Tsimihety society and economy, as in much of Madagascar, is primarily focused on agriculture. Rice is the staple crop, and the Tsimihety raise cattle. Working on crop land on Tuesday is fady – a taboo – among the Tsimihety. The main economic center among the Tsimihety is in Mandritsara.

== Bibliography ==
- Appiah, Anthony; Gates, Henry Louis Jr. (2005). Africana: The Encyclopedia of the African and African American Experience. Oxford University Press. ISBN 978-0-19-517055-9.
- Bradt, Hilary (2007). Madagascar: The Bradt Travel Guide. Bradt Travel Guides. ISBN 978-1-84162-197-5.
- Diagram Group (2013). Encyclopedia of African Peoples. San Francisco, CA: Routledge. ISBN 9781135963415.
- Fox, Leonard (1990). Hainteny: The Traditional Poetry of Madagascar. Bucknell University Press. ISBN 978-0-8387-5175-6.
- Graeber, David (2004). Fragments of an Anarchist Anthropology. Dubois Publishers. ISBN 978-0-9728196-4-0.
- Lambek, Michael (2015). The Ethical Condition: Essays on Action, Person, and Value. University of Chicago Press. ISBN 978-0-226-29238-0.
- Ogot, Bethwell A. (1999). Africa from the Sixteenth to the Eighteenth Century. University of California Press. ISBN 978-0-520-06700-4.
- Perry, Richard (2007). Race and Racism. Palgrave Macmillan. pp. 74–75. ISBN 978-0-230-60919-8.
- Skutsch, Carl (2013). Encyclopedia of the World's Minorities. Routledge. ISBN 978-1-135-19388-1.
- Wilson, Peter J. (1992). Freedom by a Hair's Breadth: Tsimihety in Madagascar. University of Michigan Press. ISBN 978-0-472-10389-8.
