= Ankarinarivo Manirisoa =

- Location in Madagascar
- Coordinates: 21°25′S 47°4′E
- Country: Madagascar
- Region: Haute Matsiatra
- District: Fianarantsoa II
- Elevation: 1,166 m (3,825 ft)

Population (2001)
  - Total: 8,000
- Time zone: UTC3 (EAT)

Ankarinarivo Manirisoa is a town and commune in Madagascar. It belongs to the district of Fianarantsoa II, which is a part of Haute Matsiatra Region. The population of the commune was estimated to be approximately 8,000 according to a 2001 commune census.

Only primary schooling is available. The majority 99.5% of the population of the commune are farmers. The most important crops are rice and grapes, while other important agricultural products are pineapple and cassava. Services provide employment for 0.5% of the population.
