= Fanjakana, Fianarantsoa II =

Fanjakana
- Location in Madagascar
- Coordinates: 21°11′S 46°53′E
- Country: Madagascar
- Region: Haute Matsiatra
- District: Isandra

Area
  - Total: 462.82 km^{2} (178.70 sq mi)
- Elevation: 1,247 m (4,091 ft)

Population (2001)
  - Total: 10,000
- Time zone: UTC3 (EAT)
- Postal code: 314

Fanjakana is a rural municipality in Madagascar. It belongs to the district of Isandra, which is a part of Haute Matsiatra Region. The population of the commune was estimated to be approximately 10,000 in 2001 commune census.

Primary and junior level secondary education are available in town. The majority 98% of the population of the commune are farmers. The most important crops are rice and peanuts, while other important agricultural products are beans and cassava. Services provide employment for 2% of the population.
