= Soatanana =

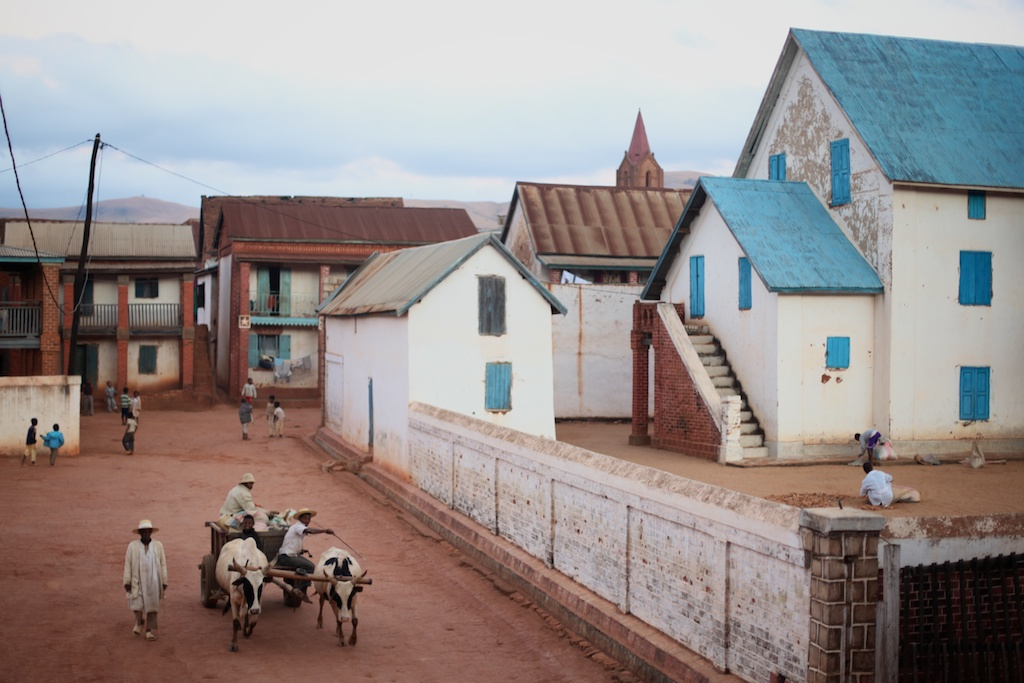

- Location in Madagascar
- Coordinates: 21°23′S 46°55′E
- Country: Madagascar
- Region: Haute Matsiatra
- District: Fianarantsoa II

Area
  - Total: 36.05 km^{2} (13.92 sq mi)
- Elevation: 1,141 m (3,743 ft)

Population (2001)
  - Total: 10,000
- Time zone: UTC3 (EAT)
- Postal code: 314

Soatanana is a rural municipality in Madagascar. It belongs to the district of Fianarantsoa II, which is a part of Haute Matsiatra Region. The population of the commune was estimated to be approximately 10,000 in 2001 commune census.

In addition to primary schooling the town offers secondary education at both junior and senior levels. The majority 95% of the population of the commune are farmers. The most important crops are rice and bambara groundnut, while other important agricultural products are maize, cassava and potatoes. Services provide employment for 5% of the population.

== Nature ==
The Tapia forest of Soatanana supplies the town with fruits, champignons and wild silk.
