= Ambondrona =

- Location in Madagascar
- Coordinates: 21°16′S 46°59′E
- Country: Madagascar
- Region: Haute Matsiatra
- District: Fianarantsoa II
- Elevation: 1,107 m (3,632 ft)

Population (2001)
  - Total: 13,000
- Time zone: UTC3 (EAT)

Ambondrona is a town and commune in Madagascar. It belongs to the district of Fianarantsoa II, which is a part of Haute Matsiatra Region. The population of the commune was estimated to be approximately 13,000 in 2001 commune census.

Primary and junior level secondary education are available in town. The majority 98% of the population of the commune are farmers. The most important crops are rice and beans, while other important agricultural products are peanuts, maize and cassava. Services provide employment for 1% of the population. Additionally fishing employs 1% of the population.
