= Ambalamidera II =

- Location in Madagascar
- Coordinates: 21°20′S 46°52′E
- Country: Madagascar
- Region: Haute Matsiatra
- District: Isandra district
- Elevation: 1,381 m (4,531 ft)

Population (2018)
  - Total: 5,460
- Time zone: UTC3 (EAT)

Ambalamidera II is a town and commune in Madagascar. It belongs to the Isandra district, which is a part of Haute Matsiatra Region. The population of the commune was 5,460 in 2018

Primary and junior level secondary education are available in town. The majority 99% of the population of the commune are farmers. The most important crops are rice and beans, while other important agricultural products are maize, cassava and sweet potatoes. Services provide employment for 1% of the population.
