= Manandriana District =

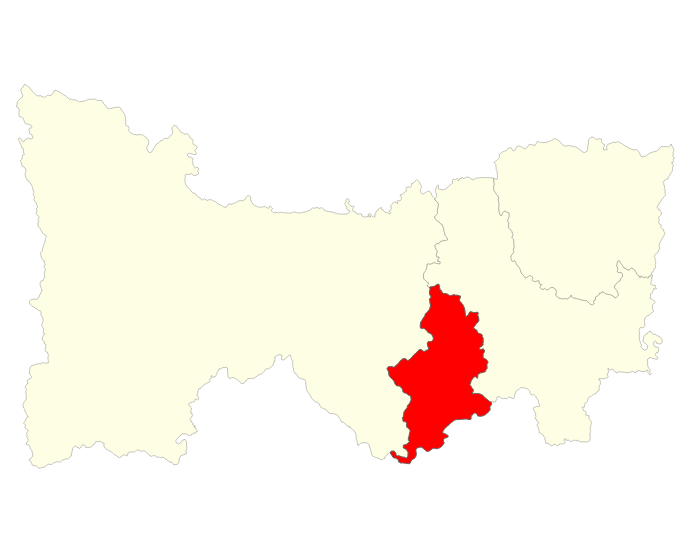
Manandriana district in Amoron'i Mania Region

Manandriana District is a district in central Madagascar. It is part of Amoron'i Mania Region. It covers an area of 981.98 km^{2}, and had a population of 111,693 in 2020. Its capital is Ambovombe Afovoany. The name of the district comes from the Kingdom of Manandriana.

== Communes ==
The district is further divided into ten communes:

- Ambatomarina
- Ambohimahazo
- Ambohimilanja
- Ambohipo
- Ambovombe Afovoany
- Andakatanikely
- Andakatany
- Anjoma Nandihizana
- Anjoman'ankona
- Talata Vohimena

== See also ==
- Anosibe Ambohiby
