= Andakatanikely =

Coordinates: 20.6424°S 47.0494°E

- Interactive map of Andakatanikely
- Country: Madagascar
- Region: Amoron'i Mania
- District: Manandriana

Population (2001)
  - Total: 6,000
- Time zone: UTC3 (EAT)

Andakatanikely is a town and commune in Madagascar. It belongs to the district of Manandriana, which is a part of Amoron'i Mania Region. The population of the commune was estimated to be approximately 6,000 in 2001 commune census.

Primary and junior level secondary education are available in town. Farming and raising livestock provides employment for 49.75% and 49.75% of the working population. The most important crop is rice, while other important products are beans, maize, sweet potatoes and tomato. Services provide employment for 0.5% of the population.
