= Anjoman'ankona =

- Location in Madagascar
- Coordinates: 20°39′S 47°06′E
- Country: Madagascar
- Region: Amoron'i Mania
- District: Manandriana

Population (2018)Census
  - Total: 7,021
- Time zone: UTC3 (EAT)
- Postal code: 323

Anjoman'ankona is a rural municipality in Madagascar. It belongs to the district of Manandriana, which is a part of Amoron'i Mania Region. As of 2018, its population is 7,021.

== Economy ==
There are crystal mines nearby.

== Nature ==
The Tapia forest of Anjoman'ankona supplies the town with fruits, champignons and wild silk.
