= Iavonomby Vohibola =

- Location in Madagascar
- Coordinates: 21°20′S 47°5′E
- Country: Madagascar
- Region: Haute Matsiatra
- District: Isandra

Area
  - Total: 36.51 km^{2} (14.10 sq mi)
- Elevation: 1,109 m (3,638 ft)

Population (2018)
  - Total: 11,526
- Time zone: UTC3 (EAT)
- Postal code: 314

Iavonomby Vohibola is a town and commune in Madagascar. It belongs to the Isandra district, which is a part of Haute Matsiatra Region. The population of the commune was 11,526 in 2018.

Only primary schooling is available. The majority 98% of the population of the commune are farmers, while an additional 0.7% receive their livelihood from raising livestock. The most important crop is rice, while other important products are cassava, sweet potatoes and potatoes. Services provide employment for 0.3% of the population. Additionally fishing employs 1% of the population.
