= Mahazoarivo, Fianarantsoa II =

Mahazoarivo
- Location in Madagascar
- Coordinates: 21°22′S 46°49′E
- Country: Madagascar
- Region: Haute Matsiatra
- District: Fianarantsoa II
- Elevation: 1,274 m (4,180 ft)

Population (2001)
  - Total: 12,000
- Time zone: UTC3 (EAT)

Mahazoarivo is a town and commune in Madagascar. It belongs to the district of Fianarantsoa II, which is a part of Haute Matsiatra Region. The population of the commune was estimated to be approximately 12,000 in 2001 commune census.

Only primary schooling is available. The majority 98% of the population of the commune are farmers. The most important crops are rice and peanuts, while other important agricultural products are beans and cassava. Services provide employment for 2% of the population.
