= Languages of Madagascar =

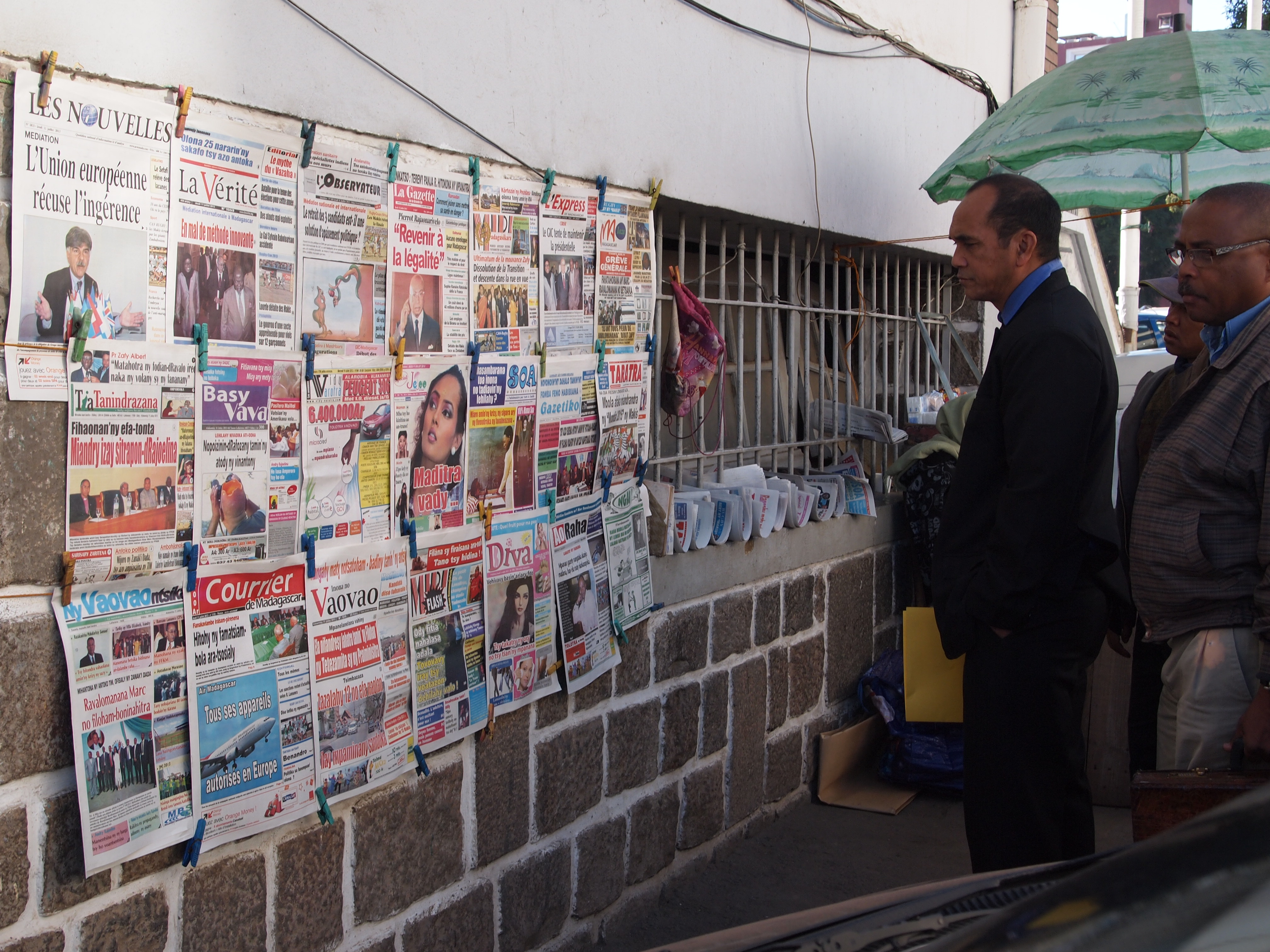
- People reading news in Antananarivo
- Official: Malagasy, French
- Recognised: English
- Signed: Malagasy Sign Language
- Keyboard layout: French AZERTY

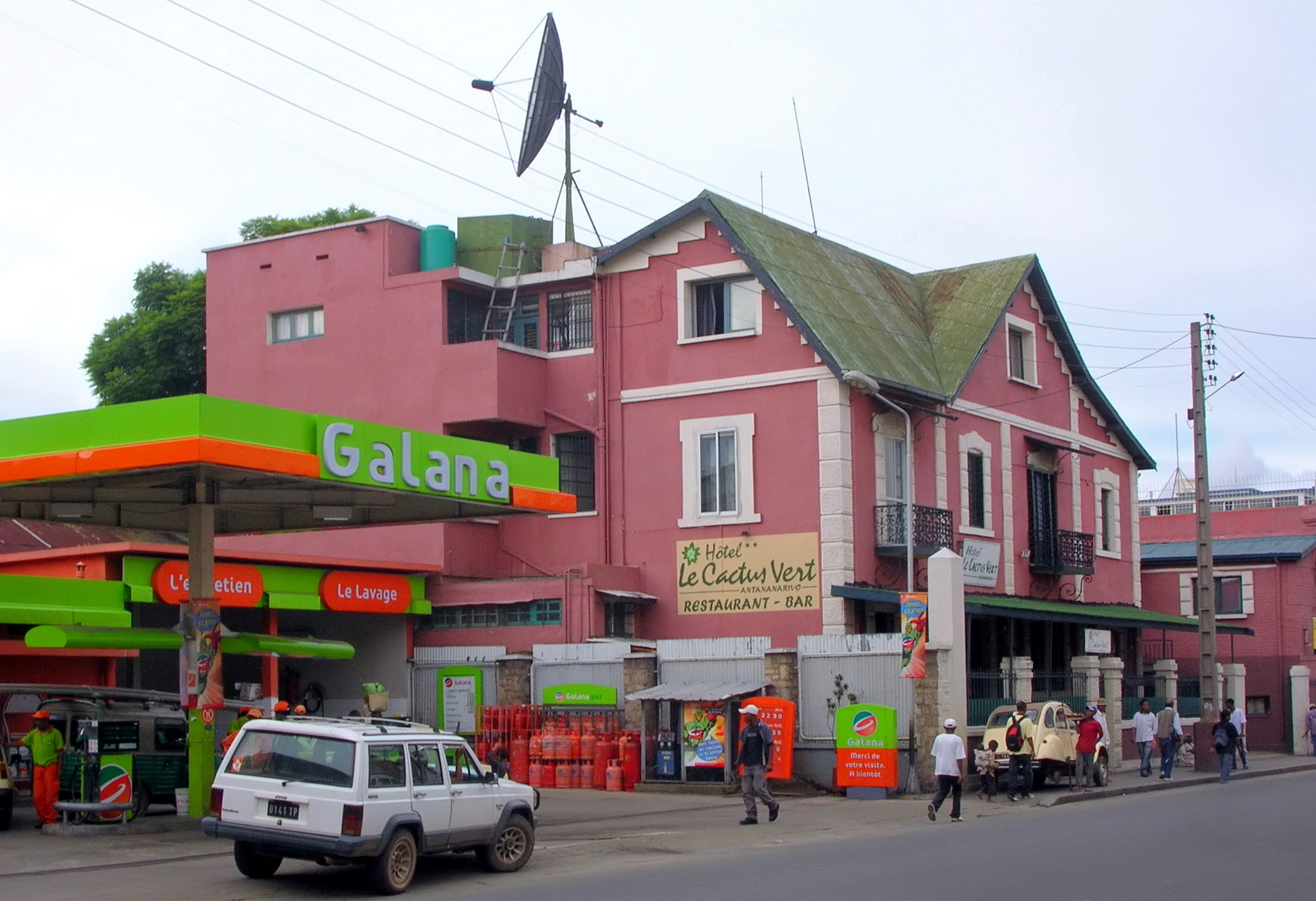
Signs in French in Antananarivo

The official languages of Madagascar are Malagasy and French. The Malagasy language, of Austronesian origin, is generally spoken throughout the island. As a member of the Organisation internationale de la Francophonie, Madagascar is a Francophone country, and in 2024, French is spoken by around a quarter of the population in Madagascar, i.e. 8.5 million people out of 32 million (26.59%).

In the first Constitution of 1958, Malagasy and French were named the official languages of the Malagasy Republic. Among the elites in large cities, French is spoken as a native language.

== Malagasy ==
One notable aspect of the linguistic situation in Madagascar, compared to many French speaking African countries, is the presence of a prominent national, official, and relatively standardized language—Malagasy—alongside French. Malagasy belongs to the Austronesian language family and was introduced to Madagascar by Indonesian emigrants who settled on the island between the 4th and 7th centuries CE.

Malagasy exhibits a range of regional dialects across the island. The Merina variety, spoken in the Antananarivo region, was chosen as the national and official language by the authorities. Determining the exact boundaries and mutual significance of these Malagasy "dialects" is challenging. Generally, mutual intelligibility is possible, though it can be difficult in some cases. While some varieties are very close and share much of their basic vocabulary, others are nearly unintelligible to speakers of different varieties.

The official and national status of Merina Malagasy is largely due to the unification efforts undertaken by King Andrianampoinimerina of the Merina people in the early 19th century. His son, King Radama I, continued these efforts by standardizing the language. Radama I sought the assistance of British and French missionaries to develop a writing system for Malagasy. In 1823, a decree established the rules for transcribing Malagasy using the Latin alphabet. This period also saw the emergence of grammars, dictionaries, and a Malagasy translation of the Bible.

== French language ==
The spread of French in Madagascar has been hybrid in nature. Initially, French was introduced by settlers who arrived on the island in the 17th and 18th centuries. However, this colonization was on a much smaller scale compared to the extensive settlements seen in the Mascarene Islands (Réunion, Mauritius) and North America. Additionally, the current presence of French in Madagascar is only marginally related to this early colonization, as the descendants of these early settlers largely integrated into the local population.

In the 19th and 20th centuries, French was further disseminated by missionaries and colonizers. This expansion involved both the implantation of French and, in some aspects, a form of overlay. Similar to what occurred in Sub-Saharan Africa, French was introduced to local elites, beginning with the Merina royalty, and later extended to the general population through education. During the colonial period, French education spread across the entire territory. From its introduction, French was associated with social prestige compared to Malagasy. This mode of expansion explains why French is predominantly present in urban areas and has struggled to penetrate rural regions.

French did not displace Malagasy, which maintained its status as the national lingua franca. Malagasy continued to serve as the primary language for domestic use, religion, and traditional culture. Notably, unlike many situations in Black Africa, French did not undergo significant vernacularization in Madagascar. Malagasy remains a national language with no international influence, while French has taken on the role of the primary language for international communication. The current importance of French (in government, media, etc.) is often justified by its value as an international language.

== Historical overview of French influence ==
French traders and explorers began establishing a presence in Madagascar as early as 1642. They initially set up base at Fort-Dauphin (now Tolagnaro) and later at Sainte-Marie island, representing the French East India Company. During this period, they engaged in some interactions with the Malagasy peoples. The Malagasy of the East Coast had frequented the French, and many of them spoke a little of their language. As French governmental control waned, Madagascar became a haven for pirates and outlaws, including French nationals, as well as some French-speaking or Creole-speaking traders from nearby islands such as Mauritius and Réunion. Over time, a mixed-race population known as the "malata" emerged, forming relatively stable Francophone communities.

In the early 19th century, under the reign of King Radama I, Madagascar began to open up to European influences. English (Protestant) and French (Jesuit) missionaries arrived, establishing schools on the island. Jesuits focused on teaching French and Catholicism to coastal Malagasy, while British missionaries taught the Bible in Malagasy, primarily in the central highlands. By 1820, King Radama entrusted education solely to foreign missions, with a significant number of schools in Antananarivo teaching in English and Malagasy.

Despite this, European influence faced resistance, especially under Queen Ranavalona I, who opposed European intervention and prohibited schooling and Christianization. Subsequent reigns saw fluctuating relations with Europe until France decided to undertake military colonization, which was viewed by the French as a civilizing mission aligned with their missionary efforts.

France formally colonized Madagascar in 1895. General Gallieni, who governed the island from 1896, implemented policies to Frenchify the population. French was mandated in all public and soon private schools, while Malagasy was restricted to its role as a vernacular language. Knowledge of French became essential for administrative positions. The establishment of the Alliance Française and the Mission Laïque Française further reinforced this policy, aimed at “civilizing and unifying through French.” The results of these francisation efforts were mixed due to the vastness of rural regions and Malagasy political resistance.

French gradually became a tool for social mobility, with proficiency in the language being crucial for advancement. “The only way to succeed was to educate oneself, meaning learning French, understanding the French, and reading their books.” This exacerbated divisions between rural populations and urban bilingual elites.

=== Independence and Malagasyization ===
Madagascar gained independence in 1960, adopting a French-style republic model with an emphasis on integrating rural populations into development efforts, especially through education. However, the Malagasy educational system, modeled after the colonial system, struggled to effectively socialize and educate the lower classes.

In 1972, nationalist student and scholar uprisings led to the Malagasyization movement, replacing French with Malagasy as the language of instruction and refocusing content on Madagascar. Despite its intent, Malagasyization exacerbated disparities between underprivileged students, who had no other access to French, and the Francophone urban bourgeoisie. From 1985 onwards, Malagasyization policies were reversed, and French was gradually reintroduced into education, starting with secondary education in 1990 and primary education in 1992. Since the late 1980s, French has seen a resurgence in the educational system.

=== Nowadays ===
No official languages were mentioned in the Constitution of 1992. Instead, Malagasy was named the national language; however, many sources still claimed that Malagasy and French were official languages, as they were de facto. In April 2000, a citizen brought a legal case on the grounds that the publication of official documents in the French language only was unconstitutional. The High Constitutional Court observed in its decision that, in the absence of a language law, French still had the character of an official language.

== Minority languages ==
Maore Comorian, also called Comorian, Comores Swahili, Komoro, Comoro, or Shimaore, has two dialects, Maore, and Shindzwani/Shindzuani. It is considered threatened by the Endangered Languages Project. There are isolated communities that use other languages, such as the Creole-speaking Indian Sunni community in Tamatave.

=== English language ===
English is not widely known across the country; its usage is largely confined to tourism and international business contexts. English was the main foreign language for the West coast particularly in the province of Toliara before the French colonization. In the Constitution of 2007, Malagasy remained the national language while official languages were reintroduced: Malagasy, French, and English. The motivation for the inclusion of English was partly to improve relations with the neighboring countries where English is used and to encourage foreign direct investment. English was removed as an official language from the constitution approved by voters in the November 2010 referendum. These results were not recognized by the political opposition or the international community, who cited lack of transparency and inclusiveness in the organization of the election by the High Transitional Authority.
