= Ambovombe Afovoany =

Ambovombe Afovoany Ambovombe Centre
- Location in Madagascar
- Coordinates: 20°46′S 47°5′E
- Country: Madagascar
- Region: Amoron'i Mania
- District: Manandriana

Government
  - Mayor: Augustin Randriatsiferana

Area
  - Total: 208 km^{2} (80 sq mi)
- Elevation: 1,455 m (4,774 ft)

Population (2001)
  - Total: 18,000
- Time zone: UTC3 (EAT)

Ambovombe Afovoany (in French:Ambovombe Centre) is a municipality in Madagascar. It belongs to the district of Manandriana, which is a part of Amoron'i Mania Region. The population of the commune was estimated to be approximately 18,000 in 2001 commune census.

In addition to primary schooling the town offers secondary education at both junior and senior levels. The town provides access to hospital services to its citizens. Farming and raising livestock provides employment for 48.5% and 48.5% of the working population. The most important crop is rice, while other important products are peanuts, beans and barley. Services provide employment for 3% of the population.

== Geography ==
This municipality is situated at a distance of 48km South-West of Ambositra.
