= Talata Vohimena =

- Location in Madagascar
- Coordinates: 20°51′S 46°58′E
- Country: Madagascar
- Region: Amoron'i Mania
- District: Manandriana
- Elevation: 1,268 m (4,160 ft)

Population (2001)
  - Total: 14,000
- Time zone: UTC3 (EAT)

Talata Vohimena is a town and commune in Madagascar. It belongs to the district of Manandriana, which is a part of Amoron'i Mania Region.

== Description ==
The population of the commune was estimated to be approximately 14,000 in 2001.

Primary and junior level secondary education are available in town. Farming and raising livestock provides employment for 47.5% and 47.5% of the working population. The most important crop is rice, while other important products are peanuts, maize and cassava. Services provide employment for 5% of the population.
