= Tsimihety dialect =

Austronesian language of Madagascar

Tsimihety
- Native to: Madagascar
- Ethnicity: Tsimihety people
- Native speakers: 2,475,000
- Language family: Austronesian: Malayo-Polynesian; Western Indonesian; Barito; East Barito; Northern Malagasic; Tsimihety
- Writing system: Latin script (Malagasy alphabet)

Language codes
- ISO 639-3: xmw
- Glottolog: tsim1257
- Linguasphere: 31-LDA-ec
- Tsimihety language sample Tsimihety woman reading gospel in the Tsimihety dialect.

Tsimihety is a northern dialect of Malagasy spoken by Tsimihety people in the region of Sofia.

== Classification ==
Tsimihety dialect belongs to the Austronesian language family. It is part of Northern Malagasy subgroup along with Northern Sakalava, Bushi, Northern Betsimisaraka and Antakarana.

== Geographic distribution ==
The Tsimihety dialect is predominantly spoken in the Sofia Region of Madagascar. Additionally, it is used by Tsimihety diaspora communities in the cities of Mahajanga and Antananarivo. It is also spoken in the Sava Region, particularly in the Andapa District.

== Vocabulary ==
Tsimihety Vocabulary
#	Gloss	Standard Malagasy	Tsimihety
Family & People
1	Father	Ray	Ada
2	People	Olona	Ologno
Time & Modality
3	Now	Izao	Izy ke
4	When	Rehefa	Izy koa
5	Only	Ihany	Fô / Fôgna
6	Even	Na	Ndre
7	Really	Tokoa	Tatô
8	Yet	Mbola	Apôla
Space & Place
9	In	Any	Akagny
10	On	Eo / Teo	Akeo / Takeo
11	Here	Ato	Akato
12	Near	Akaiky	Mariny
13	Then	Avy eo	Avy akeo
14	So	Ka	Ke
Conditions & Life
15	Suffering	Fijaliana	Fijaliagna
16	Alive	Velona	Velogno
17	Spring (Water)	Loharano	Lôharano
18	Clean	Madio	Madi
Verbs & Actions
19	To show	Aseho	Abôla
20	To hide	Afenina	Avôny
21	To listen	Mihaino	Mitandregny
