= Betsileo dialect =

Austronesian language spoken in the southern highlands of Madagascar

Betsileo
- Native to: Madagascar
- Ethnicity: Betsileo
- Language family: Austronesian: Malayo-Polynesian; Western Indonesian; Barito; East Barito; Central-Eastern Malagasic; Plateaux Malagasy; Betsileo
- Writing system: Latin script (Malagasy alphabet)

Language codes
- ISO 639-1: mg
- ISO 639-3: plt
- Glottolog: bets1235
- Linguasphere: 31-LDA-aj
- Betsileo dialect sample 1 A woman speaking in the Betsileo dialect about helping malnourished children. Betsileo dialect sample 2 Betsileo peasants praising support received from ADRA projects in the Betsileo Betsileo dialect - Ambatofinandrahana An elder man telling the story of a local princess curse upon the city of Ambatofinandrahana

Betsileo is a dialect of Malagasy spoken in the homeland of Betsileo people.

== Classification ==
Betsileo is an Austronesian language part of the Plateaux branch of Malagasy language.

== Geographic distribution ==
The Betsileo dialect is widely spoken in the regions of Amoron'i Mania and Matsiatra Ambony. It is the primary dialect spoken in the cities of Fianarantsoa, Ambositra, and Ambalavao.

== Vocabulary ==
Betsileo gloss
#	Gloss	Standard Malagasy	Betsileo
Pronouns & Numbers
1	One	Iray	Iraika
2	One (last night)	Iray halina	Iray haligna
3	I / Me	Izaho / Aho	Aho / A
4	He / She / Him / Her	Izy	Izy/Ihy
5	We	Izahay / Isika	Agnay / Atsika
6	You	Anao / Anareo	Agnao / Agnareo
Negation & Intensity
7	All	Avy	Aby
8	Not	Tsy	Tsa
9	Really / Very	Tena	Tegna
10	Too much	Be loatra	Be loatsa
Grammar & Concepts
11	That	no	ro
12	Question	Fanontaniana	Fanontanena
13	To say	Miteny	Mitarogna
Daily Life
14	Family	Fianakaviana	Fianakavena
15	Fear	Tahotra	Tahotsa
