= 1904–1905 uprising in Madagascar =

The 1904–1905 uprising in Madagascar was an uprising in Southeastern regions Madagascar of Atsimo Atsinanana and Anosy that lasted from 17 November 1904 to 30 August 1905. Its causes laid in French disregard for Malagasy culture, executions without trial by French administrators, heavy taxation, and forced labour.

Malagasy Protestants tended to support the uprising, while Malagasy Catholics tended to oppose it. For this reason, a large amount of Catholic churches were burned down by the rebels.

== Timeline ==
It began on 17 November 1904, when Sergent Vinay, chief of the military post of Amparihy, was stabbed to death by a group of Malagasy rebels in his cabin in the village of Marotsipanga. The murderers included a chieftain named Mahafiry and his two sons Imoza and Fandrana. Upon sharing the news of the murder on 19 November, Mahafiry convinced locals in Amparihy to join him in an uprising against French rule in Madagascar. Rebel military decisions at that point came to be handled by 2 indigenous corporals, Kotavy and Tsimanindry. A subsequent French punitive expedition by Lieutenant Baguet would end up being a disaster for the French, with the French assault on Amparihy being repelled and with Baguet being killed. Kotavy's exploits in the Battle of Amparihy transformed him, almost overnight, from a French deserter to a revolutionary leader aimed at overthrowing French rule in Madagascar.

Having defeated the French at Amparihy, the rebellion spread to Midony, Ranotsara, Befotaka, and Begogo. At Begogo, the rebels massacred a group of French soldiers. In late November, the rebels reached the district of Vondrozo and the French post at Bemahala. On 2 December, a rebel attack on Vatanato was barely repelled after reserves aided the French defenders. That defeat notwithstanding, the rebels captured Ranomafana (2 Dec), Isaka (3 Dec), Esira (3 Dec), Itapert (4 Dec), Fort Dauphin (4 Dec), and Menambaro (6 Dec). The rebel advance was marked by widespread looting.

However, rebel victories were not to last. On 23 November, A military expedition under Captain Quinque encompassing 100 guns was dispatched from Vangaindrano towards Begogo and Ranotsara. On 2 December, Quinque's forces defeated the rebels at Ambiliony and subsequently captured the villages of Ranotsara and Begogo. From Ranotsara, Quinque's forces advanced on Ihosy, where they massacred 18 civilians. The French attempted to follow up these victories by defeating Kotavy's forces at Iobomary, but were unsuccessful, with Kotavy repelling every assault and still controlling the village by March 1905. However, with resources dwindling, Kotavy was forced to retreat to a better defensive position, and on 15 March, his forces retreated to Papanga, to the northwest of Ranotsara. Eventually Kotavy had to also abandon Papanga and had to hide in the forest of Farahigelahy, northwest of Amparihy. After the information regarding his whereabouts was given to the French by one of his captured supporters on 19 August, Kotavy was finally arrested on 30 August in Sandravinany. After the fall of Kotavy, other rebel leaders quickly surrendered, ending the revolt. Kotavy was executed on 5 September. Despite another uprising in 1947, Madagascar would remain under French rule until 1960.
