= Beara =

Beara may refer to:

- Beara, Jamalpur, a village Bangladesh
- Beara Peninsula, Ireland
- Beara GAA, a sporting organisation on the Beara Peninsula
- Beara (moth), a genus of Nolidae
- Beara, Ampanihy, a rural municipality in Ampanihy Ouest (district), Madagascar

== People ==
- Ljubiša Beara (1939–2017), member of the Bosnian Serb Army
- Vladimir Beara (1928–2014), Yugoslav footballer
