= Mining industry of Madagascar =

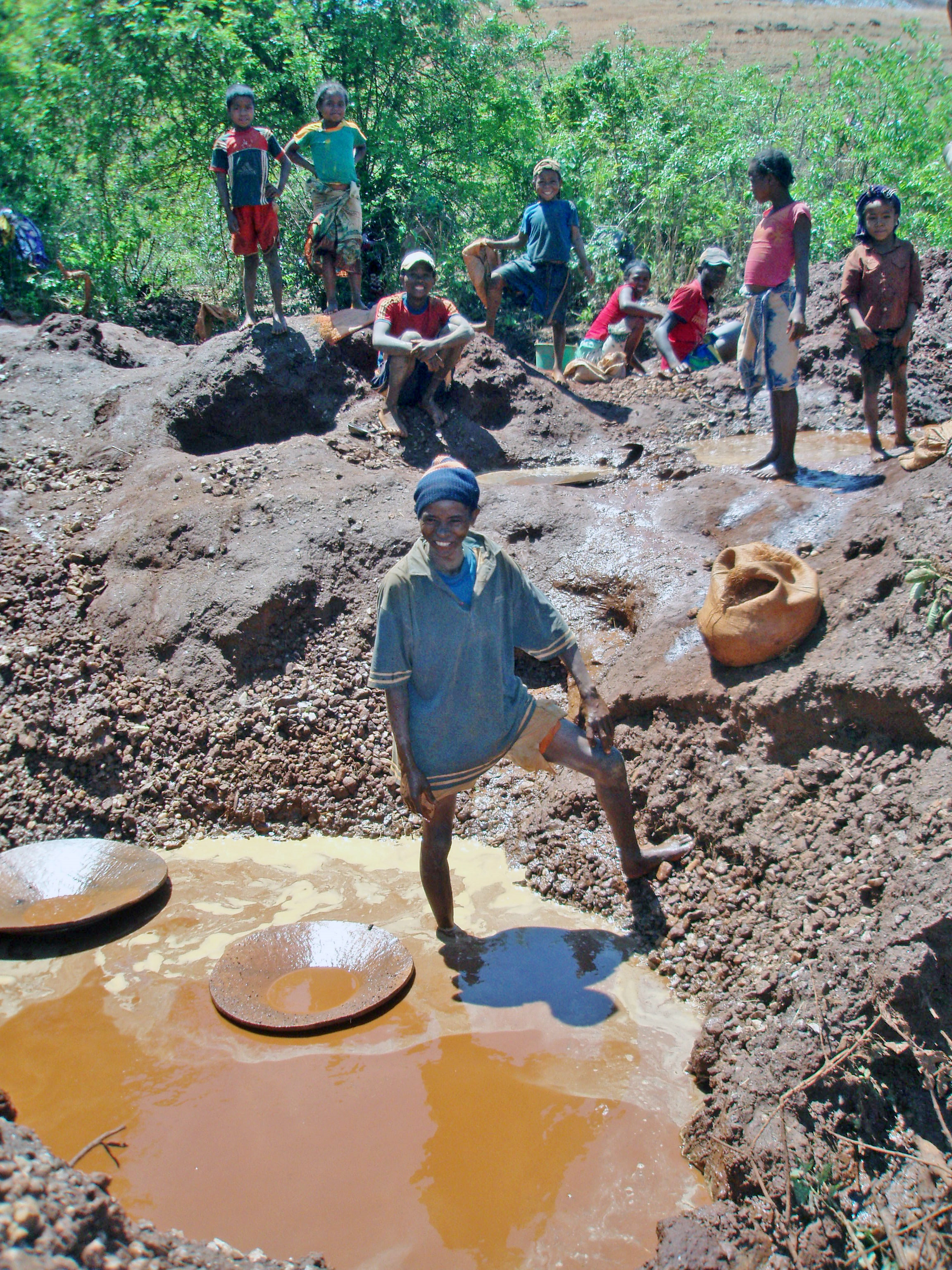
Gold washing at Anosivola

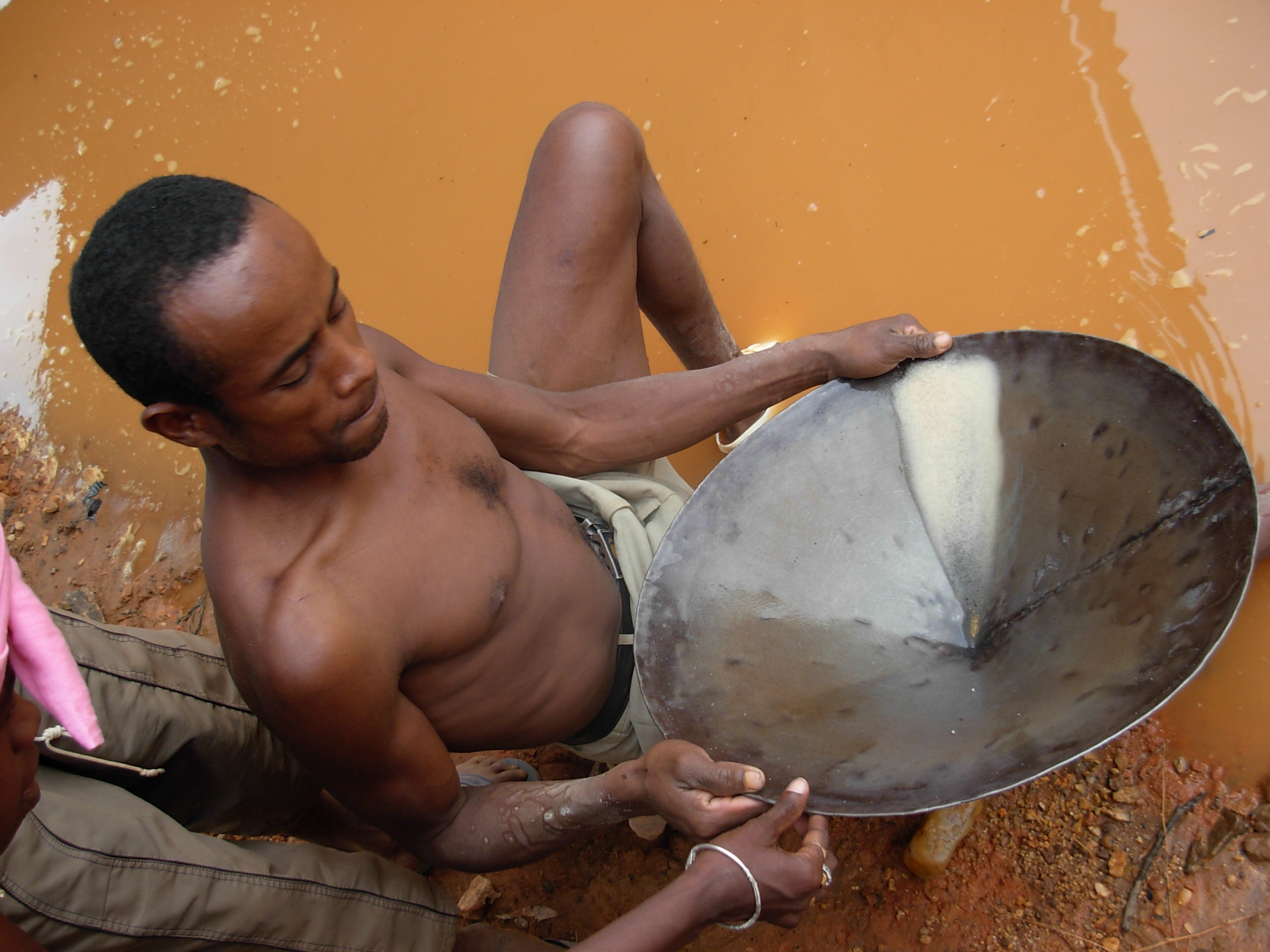
Placer mining in Madagascar

The mining industry of Madagascar is mostly on a small scale, centred mainly around remote locations with large mineral deposits. Mining potential is noted in industrial and metallic minerals, energy, precious and semi-precious stones, as well as ornamental stone. The mining sector was neglected by the government for decades prior to the mid-2000s. In 2013, the mining industry, a main source of foreign investment, was struggling due to "low metals prices and distrustful companies", attributed to a 2009 coup.

== History ==
Mining was a part of Madagascar's cultural lore dating back to the 15th century before it became a reality at the beginning of the 19th century. Speculations of valuable metal and mineral deposits in Madagascar came with the arrival of the Imerina people, also known as the Antimerina, Merina, or Hova people, in the 15th century when they established their small kingdom in central Madagascar.

These speculations of valuable metal and mineral deposits are rooted in a traditional Malagasy story titled Tantaran'ny Andriana (which translates as The History of the Nobles). Tantaran'ny Andriana is a story told in the oral tradition that shares the history of the kings of Imerina. In addition to sharing the history of the Imerina kings, Tantaran'ny Andriana suggests that there are prevalent silver deposits across the island.

As people around the world, especially Europeans, began to hear Tantaran'ny Andriana and therefore, the associated speculations of valuable mineral and metal deposits, explorers began to search for "Malagasy Eldorado," which roughly translates to "Madagascar, the country of fabulous riches." The main group of explorers searching for "Malagasy Eldorado" and the precious deposits were Europeans. The first known explorer to search for Madagascar's deposits was Tristão da Cunha, a Portuguese explorer, yet he was followed by many other European explorers. Upon arrival, explorers did not find the extent of valuable deposits that they were expecting – they found that the gold, silver, and other metals and minerals were typically imported to Madagascar and then turned into jewelry.

Although European explorers did not find the deposits they were expecting, it is believed that the Malagasy people during this period did have knowledge of and worked alluvial deposits, which is "the mining of stream bed deposits," for "volamena" (gold). These alluvial deposits were a secret guarded by the Sakalava and then Merina monarchs – with hopes to avoid international exploitation – until the 1820s when word got out about the deposits.

Once the evidence of the deposits in Madagascar was known internationally, the Merina queen, who by this point was Queen Ranavolana I of Madagascar, sponsored explorations for silver and gold deposits across the island in the name of the crown. These initial pushes for exploration remained a pattern throughout her reign until major gold deposits were found in the 1840s and 1850s. Although this discovery was significant, Ranavalona I did not push to further develop them because she could feel the European colonial pressures encroaching on Madagascar. In 1883, under the reign of Queen Ranavalona III, the granddaughter of Ranavalona I, this changed, gold deposits were explored and exploited, which ultimately was one of the factors that led to the French colonization of Madagascar in 1896.

Madagascar contains deposits of copper, iron and manganese ores, graphite, rock salt, niter, pyrites, and some minor minerals. By the early 20th century, gold was mined in alluvial deposits spread over the island. At the same time, antimony, copper, iron and tin were thought to be abundant, in addition to asphalt, coal, and petroleum. Deposits of alluvial gold were found in the valley of the Ampoasary River, a tributary of the Mananjary River, about 40 miles (64 km) east of Ambositra. While the auriferous gravel was being washed in pans by approximately 3,000 local workers in the early 20th century, there were expectations that reef mining would supersede the primitive methods of gold extraction. In 1905, several syndicates were formed in the Transvaal to acquire properties in Madagascar, with some Rand mining experts visiting the island that year.

In comparison to Madagascar's mining industry throughout the 19th and 20th centuries, its mining industry today does not have as much of a positive impact on Madagascar's livelihood. According to data from 2014, the mining industry provides jobs for over 800,000 people, approximately half of which are filled by women.

== Production and impact ==
Today, Madagascar's mining industry is separated into two main types of mining: Artisanal and Small-Scale Mining (ASM) and large-scale public-private mining. Artisanal and small-scale operations are typically not associated with companies – it is more of an individual operation and large-scale mining involves large, often international companies. ASM operations tend to focus on mining for precious metals and precious and semi-precious stones than large-scale public-private mining. For example, most artisanal and small-scale miners tend to mine for precious metals and stones like gold and sapphires, when large-scale public-private miners tend to mine for large amounts of minerals.

For context, the gold output in 1904 was 2,641 kg (84,910 ozs.), valued at £316,995. In the following year, 1905, the quantity produced was 2,370 kg (76,197 ozs.), valued at £286,804. 113 years later, in 2018, according to data from the United States Geological Survey (USGS) the quantity of gold produced in Madagascar in 2018 reached the highest reported record of gold produced on Malagasy land – 3,000.00 kg (105, 821 ozs). The most recent data from the USGS states that the quantity of gold produced in 2020 was 2,100.00 kg (74,075.32 ozs).

The extraction rate recorded in this sector was 121% during 2010, which has been sustained by an increase in substantial extraction of agate, quartz, zircon, ilmenite, rutile, labradorite, limestone and marble, cement, graphite, gemstones, nickel and cobalt.

According to the Plan d'action Madagascar 2007-2012, from both large and small-scale mining operations, mining makes up 4% of Madagascar's GDP. More recently, as of 2018, the mining industry accounts for 4.6% of the GDP, 4.4% of the government revenue, and 28% of exports annually. According to the Extractive Industries Transparency Initiative (EITI), these statistics highlight the growth of the mining industry to Madagascar's economy, but the total government revenue should be higher than it currently is. The EITI believes this because of the significant portion of illegal exports of gold. Looking into the future, the Plan d'action Madagascar 2007-2012 predicts that the mining proportion of the GDP will increase to 30% as Madagascar shifts from a mainly artisanal and small-scale based mining industry to a large-scale public-private industry.

== Impact of Madagascar's mining industry ==
Although Madagascar's economy is supported by the mining industry, in terms of ASM, as well as in terms of large-scale public-private mining initiatives, these mining efforts heavily impact Madagascar's natural environment and therefore, the Malagasy people and culture. These impacts can be recognized as environmental injustices.

=== Environmental injustices of Madagascar's mining industry ===
In general, mining is a naturally destructive process and the mining industry in Madagascar is not excluded from this generalization. The sheer definition of mining – "the industry and activities connected with getting valuable or useful minerals from the ground" – inherently results in the destruction of a physical environment to obtain these minerals from the earth. When conducting explorations or excavations of an area for the purposes of mining, entire ecosystems are destroyed which in turn results in a loss of overall biodiversity.

In Madagascar, the two types of mining used affect the natural environment in different ways. In terms of ASM operations, there are fewer miners that work individually or in small groups in remote areas to find precious metals and stones. These mining initiatives take place away from permanent settlements like villages. The land that artisanal and small-scale miners often explore are areas known as "tany malalaky" meaning land that is "open and available" – highlighting the Malagasy belief that no one person or group "owns" the land. Because of this customary land selection process, there is no displacement of people involved – even other miners. Miners can not select pieces of land that could potentially harm the structure of another miner's "pit" or "basin." "Tany malalaky" is an unspoken Malagasy custom that reflects their belief that the land does not "belong" to one person – "it ‘belongs' to its guardian spirits."

When looking at large-scale public-private mining initiatives, "tany malalaky" doesn't play a significant role in the land selection process. When selecting an area for a large-scale initiative, the factors taken into consideration are mainly economic – the amount of mineral or metal available for extraction and the potential profits. Social and cultural impacts of large-scale mining initiatives are not often taken into account. Many of these social and cultural factors are rooted in the loss of individual livelihood and communities by way of physical displacement of (typically rural) populations or restricted access to protected natural zones. Additionally, for those working on-site, they often suffer from poor working conditions and mistreatment due to unjust policies, as well as from the pollutants inherently associated with the industry and their potential health impacts.

Over the past 40 years, these social and cultural injustices have gained nationwide attention due to two large-scale mining initiatives: the QIT Madagascar Minerals operated Mandena mine in Fort Dauphin, Anosy, and the World Titanium Resources' (WTR) Toliara Sands project located just outside of Toliara, Madagascar in the Ranobe protected area. The QMM SA project is an initiative that began with a 1986 agreement between QIT-Fer et Titane Inc. – a subsidiary of Rio Tinto, one of the largest mineral and metal mining corporations globally, and Office des Mines Nationales et des Industries Stratégiques (the Office of National Mines and Strategic Industries of Madagascar) – a Malagasy public agency – saying that the profits of the QMM project will be split 80% to the Rio Tinto Corporation and 20% to the Malagasy government. This project consists of sand mining for zircon and open-pit mining for ilmenite (the primary ore of titanium). The Toilara Sands project is a sand mining initiative for minerals that is projected to last for up to 100 years.

As discussed earlier, both projects deeply impact their surrounding natural environment, yet they also impact the social and cultural environments of Madagascar. For example, both projects led to the displacement of people, yet the displacement had different effects depending on the implicated population. In terms of the QMM SA project, people were displaced from their homes without any say in the project – the only ones discussing the potential implications were the corporate and governmental parties involved. This lack of communication resulted in those who were displaced, who are typically the rural populations, having two options: to move to a dedicated piece of land or to be bought out by the government or corporation involved. Although these two options for those living on the land of the site seem sufficient, the compensation is ultimately inadequate for the needs of the Malagasy because of their agriculturally-based lifestyle. The compensation provided was insufficient to purchase land that was suitable for agriculture, nor was the provided land suitable for agriculture. This becomes a problem when approximately 64% of Madagascar's population depends on agriculture as their livelihood. Additionally, even when communities are not forcefully displaced, in certain scenarios it is necessary for them to leave. In the Toilara Sands project, surrounding communities were forced to leave because of the restrictions placed on natural resources. In the case of the Toilara Sands project, water access was cut-off. This is not only a problem because water is a necessity of life, but was also necessary to maintain their agricultural livelihood. For those who are not displaced forcefully or out of necessity, and continue to live near or work at the mines, they often suffer from poor working conditions due to a lack of enforced policies, as well as face the health impacts due to the pollution caused by the mining projects.

These injustices associated with the mining industry in Madagascar tend to be the most visible and therefore are often the most contested. For example, when World Titanium Resources was pushing for the Toilara Sands project there was immediate pushback against the project because of the proposed area for the mine (a protected, natural environment) and due to the destruction and pollution that this mining project would bring. Although there is pushback against the projects and the mining industry in general due to the injustices involved, it is necessary to recognize that both projects mentioned above are ongoing. The Toilara Sands project has been under construction since 2013 and the QMM SA project has been active since 1981.

== Legal framework ==
The Mining Law of 20 February 1902, was amended in November 1905; amongst other provisions the charge for a prospecting permit was reduced from £4 to £1. The present-day laws of the land related to the mining sector are: Act No. 2005-022 of 17 October 2005 which is an amendment to Law No. 2001-031 of 8 October 2002 prescribing specific rules for large investments; Act No. 2005-021 of 17 October 2005 which is an amendment to Law No. 99-022 of 19 August 1999; and Mining Code; and Decree No. 2006-910 of 19 August 2006 on execution of mining Code.

== Commodities ==
Minerals, both industrial and metallic, are numerous including ilmenite, graphite, limestone, gypsum, dolomite, silica, mica, titanium, quartz, gold, platinum group, silver, iron, copper, zinc, nickel, cobalt, chromite, coal, and uranium. Madagascar is also rich in precious and semi-precious stones: ruby, sapphire, emerald, aquamarine, beryl, tourmaline, topaz, garnet, cordierite, rose quartz, amethyst, and citrine. Decorative stones found are marble, silicified wood, and jasper.

== Mines ==
- Ambatovy mine (nickel and cobalt)
- Ankaizina mine (bauxite)
- Ankililoaka mine, Atsimo-Andrefana (titanium)
- Bekisopa mine (iron)
- Basibasy mine, in Atsimo-Andrefana (titanium)
- Betioky mine (iron)
- Farafangana mine (bauxite)
- Fenoarivo mine (iron)
- Green Giant mine (vanadium)
- Manantenina mine (bauxite)
- Mandena mine (ilmenite)
- Molo mine, Atsimo-Andrefana, (graphite)
- Ranobe mine (titanium)
- Soalala mine (iron)
- Sahamamy graphite mine (graphite, in Fetraomby)
- Marovinsty mine, near Vatomandry (graphite, Ets.Gallois S.A.)
- Artsirakambo mine, near Brickaville (graphite, Ets.Gallois S.A.)
- Ambalafotaka mine, (graphite, Ets.Gallois S.A.)
- Kraoma chromium mine (Kraomita Malagasy S.A - Brieville)
- Holcim (cement, plant in Ibity)
- Madagascar Long Cimenterie (Maloci) (cement, plant in Ambohimanambola, Betafo)

== See also ==
- Geology of Madagascar

== Bibliography ==
- Europa Publications (2003). Africa South of the Sahara 2004. Psychology Press. ISBN 978-1-85743-183-4.
- House of Commons (1907). Sessional papers. Inventory control record 1 (Public domain ed.). Great Britain. Parliament.
- International Monetary Fund (13 February 2007). Republic of Madagascar: Poverty Reduction Strategy Paper. International Monetary Fund. ISBN 978-1-4527-4374-5.
- Western and Company (1896). Engineering and Mining Journal (Public domain ed.). Western and Company.
