= Manambondro =

- Location in Madagascar
- Coordinates: 23°48′S 47°33′E
- Country: Madagascar
- Region: Atsimo-Atsinanana
- District: Vangaindrano
- Elevation: 5 m (16 ft)

Population (2001)
  - Total: 15,000
- Time zone: UTC3 (EAT)
- Postal code: 320

Manambondro is a rural municipality in Madagascar. It belongs to the district of Vangaindrano, which is a part of Atsimo-Atsinanana Region. The population of the commune was estimated to be approximately 15,000 in 2001 commune census.

Manambondro is served by a local airport. Primary and junior level secondary education are available in town. The majority 98% of the population of the commune are farmers. The most important crop is rice, while other important products are coffee, cloves and cassava. Services provide employment for 1% of the population. Additionally fishing employs 1% of the population.

== Roads ==
Manambondro is situated the National road 12A at 186 km north from Fort Dauhpin or 75 km north of Manantenina and 58km south of Vangaindrano. The 9th ferry crossing from Fort Dauphin over the Mamandro river is situated south of the town.
