= Bekaraoka =

- Location in Madagascar
- Coordinates: 23°28′S 47°37′E
- Country: Madagascar
- Region: Atsimo-Atsinanana
- District: Vangaindrano
- Elevation: 24 m (79 ft)

Population (2001)
  - Total: 3,000
- Time zone: UTC3 (EAT)
- Postal code: 320

Bekaraoka is a rural municipality in Madagascar. It belongs to the district of Vangaindrano, which is a part of Atsimo-Atsinanana Region. The population of the commune was estimated to be approximately 3,000 in 2001 commune census.

Only primary schooling is available. The majority 98% of the population of the commune are farmers. The most important crops are rice and cloves, while other important agricultural products are coffee and cassava. Services provide employment for 2% of the population.

== Geography ==
Bekaraoka is situated South-West of Farafangana and in the North-West of Vangaindrano. The next National road (RN 12) is in a distance of 16 km. The dirt road to Bekaraoka can be passed by vehicles only in the dry season.
