= Sakalava Conquest of Boina =

Sakalava expansion leading to the formation of the Boina kingdom

- Part of Sakalava expansion
| Date | Late 17th century to early 18th century |
| Location | region of Ambongo and Boeny |
| Result | Sakalava victory; Establishment of the Kingdom of Boina |

Belligerents
| Sakalava and Vazimba allies | Local tribes of the Ambongo and Boina region |

Commanders and leaders
| Andriamandisoarivo | Various Ambongo and Boina chiefs |

The Sakalava conquest of Boina refers to the series of military campaigns led by the Sakalava prince Itoedefona also named Tsimanatona or posthumesly Andriamandisoarivo, who departed from Menabe and expanded northward into Ambongo, Boeny and the inland territories of northwestern Madagascar. His campaigns laid the foundations of the Kingdom of Boina and inaugurated the dynastic line known as the Volamena of Boina.

== Departure from Menabe and advance toward Ambongo ==
Excluded from the succession of the Kingdom of Menabe in favor of his brother Andriamanetriarivo, Andriamandisoarivo went north to start his own kingdom. Leaving the frontier regions of Menabe, Andriamandisoarivo led Sakalava forces northward across lands inhabited by Vazimba communities, who fled at his approach and some of whom joined his expedition. He then entered the region of Ambongo and subdued the local tribes, the Tsiahodikay and the Joribohitra, after several engagements. These victories opened the way for further expansion into the interior.

== Conquest of the inland Boina ==
After crossing the Baly River, Andriamandisoarivo advanced into the territory of the Sandrangoaty, who were quickly brought under Sakalava authority. He next entered the land of Mananara, then inhabited by the Mananadabo. The region, watered by the river Mananara known today as the Betsiboka was unable to resist the seasoned Sakalava warriors. The Mananadabo were defeated, and many fled to what later became the settlement of Marofotsy.

Continuing his campaigns eastward, Andriamandisoarivo subdued the Antambohilava, who inhabited the region between the rivers Mahajamba and Loza River. The defeat triggered a significant flight of refugees into the neighboring lands of the Antandrona (Tsimihety). Alarmed by the approach of the Sakalava, the Antandrona sent envoys to greet the conqueror and recognize his suzerainty. Having reached the limits of the lands he intended to subdue, Andriamandisoarivo established his residence at Trongay on the Bombetoka Bay, near the future site of Mahajanga.

== Submission of Boina coastal zones ==
At the head of the Boeny Bay stood a settlement of the same name, one of several villages founded long before the arrival of the Sakalava by the Antalaotra. One of these villages, Langany in the Bay of Mahazamba, had already fallen to Andriamandisoarivo during an earlier northern expedition. Unable to defend Boeny, the Antalaotra moved their goods to a nearby island in the bay, where they fortified themselves with the assistance of neighboring villages.

Their insular position allowed them to resist for several years, until the island was taken by surprise and the population was compelled to submit. Pleased with this victory, which ended local resistance and brought into his realm a commercially active population, Andriamandisoarivo gave his kingdom the name Boeny, known as Boina in Merina.

A treaty of friendship between the brothers Andriamanetriarivo and Andriamandisoarivo fixed the Ranobe River as the boundary between their respective realms, formalizing the frontier between Menabe and Boina. With Andriamandisoarivo began the dynastic line known as the Volamena of Boina.

== End of Antalaotra independence ==
Following their submission, part of the Antalaotra returned to the mainland, while the principal families remained on the island, hoping eventually to restore their autonomy. Their leader, Faki, secretly rebuilt the fortifications in preparation for resistance. When Andriamandisoarivo learned of the plot, he summoned Faki to Trongay under false pretenses and had him executed.

To prevent further unrest, he adopted a policy aimed at dividing the Antalaotra elites. He reduced the influence of the noble families and set their interests against those of the broader community. Among these measures was the appointment of a low-born Antalaotra, Hassan Ben Youmah, as sultan of the Muslims, replacing Faki. Fearing for his safety, Hassan-ben-Youmah advised the king to confer the title on his young grand daughter Andrianentaniarivo, while he exercised real authority in her name.

Raised by the Antalaotra and converted to Islam, Andrianentaniarivo first married an Arab merchant from Surat, Seïd Abderrhaman, and later another Arab, Sidy Ahmet of Patta. After the death of Hassan Ben Youmah, leadership passed to his son Youmah Ben Hassan, consolidating Sakalava control over the coastal Muslim communities.

== Legacy ==
The reign of Andriamandisoarivo was marked by continuous warfare typical of a state formed through conquest, as well as tensions inherent in integrating diverse peoples into a new political structure. Despite the severity of some measures, his rule proved foundational and was later regarded as glorious.

As national unity and interethnic fusion developed in later generations, the Sakalava venerated their founding ruler. His name was invoked during political and religious ceremonies, and his spirit was called upon during significant events. Andriamandisoarivo ruled for roughly thirty years and was buried at Trongay, his capital.

At the time of his death, the newly formed Kingdom of Boina already counted among its tributaries several major groups: the Antandrona, the Bezanozano, the Sihanaka, the Manendy and the Amboalambo (Merina).
