= Vakoka Vakiteny =

- Industry: Publishing
- Founded: 2008; 18 years ago
- Headquarters: Toliara, Madagascar
- Website: vakiteny.org

Vakoka Vakiteny is a small non-profit publishing company producing literature for children and youth in Malagasy language, mainly created by young Malagasy writers and illustrators. It is located in Toliara in the south west of Madagascar (Atsimo Andrefana Region) and owned and run by Andriamparany Rakotondrainy, a Malagasy teacher and development professional.

== Etymology ==
Vakoka (Malagasy): 'something precious', 'something that is given by the ancestors'

Vakiteny (Malagasy): 'reading'

== History ==
Vakoka Vakiteny's activities trace back to the project "The Joy of Reading" (La joie de lire), initiated by the National Centre for Reading Education and Research at the University of Stavanger in Norway from 2006 to 2008. This project resulted in the production of three modern children's books by young Malagasy artists, which were distributed free of charge to children and schools.

Following the completion of this project, Vakoka Vakiteny was founded in 2008 as an independent publishing compagny to continue the work of "The Joy of Reading" by building on existing expertise but with different funding sources. Its purpose was the production of modern and creative children's books and school materials in Malagasy language with a special focus on human rights, the rights of women and girls, and environmental protection and thus to develop and produce quality books for Malagasy children. The logo of Vakoka Vakiteny is the small, clever lizard Dangaligny, the main character of the first children's book produced.

In 2009, the Madagascar School and Children's Books Association (Förderverein Madagaskar Schul- und Kinderbücher e.V.) was founded in Germany to financially support the activities of Vakoka Vakiteny. The association, with over 30 members, is based in Schopfheim, Baden.

School Library Mahazoarivo II, Antsirabe, inside

Vakoka Vakiteny cooperates with the Malagasy government for production and distribution of school books and literature for children and youth and the elaboration of teacher training programmes about the use of mother tongue literature in teaching.

Since 2021, Vakoka Vakiteny has supported the construction of small school libraries as safe spaces for children, especially those from disadvantaged backgrounds, to read and do their schoolwork. The libraries are brightly painted with illustrations from Vakoka Vakiteny's books and are designed to encourage the children's creativity.

== Main Activities ==
The main activities of Vakoka Vakiteny are to develop, produce and edit quality literature in Malagasy language for Malagasy children and youth with a main focus on women's and children's rights as well as nature and the environment, to promote the joy of reading, love for and knowledge of one's mother tongue, and to develop the understanding of literature and art in a modern Malagasy environment. Malagasy writers and illustrators shall be stimulated to creativity and the publishing of their products shall be supported. It is intended to promote the extent of literature in Malagasy, to strengthen the use of the Malagasy language in all contexts and to form a forum for modern Malagasy literature and illustration.

== Results ==
Since 2007, Vakoka Vakiteny has published 22 book titles and distributed over 41,000 copies to schools, institutions, children and young people. These include books for beginning readers, young adult novels, fairy tales, games and sports manuals for teachers and students, and non-fiction books on geography, nature, and environmental protection. New releases were regularly reported in the Vakoka Vakiteny newsletter.

In addition, regular workshops have been held for teachers and students on using literature in schools, as well as on creative writing and drawing.

Two school libraries have been completed so far—in Antsirabe, Mahazoarivo II, and in Ambohimanambola, Betafo District. Construction of a third library in Vatomandry on the east coast of Madagascar is expected to be completed in 2027.
