= Vangaindrano District =

Vangaindrano
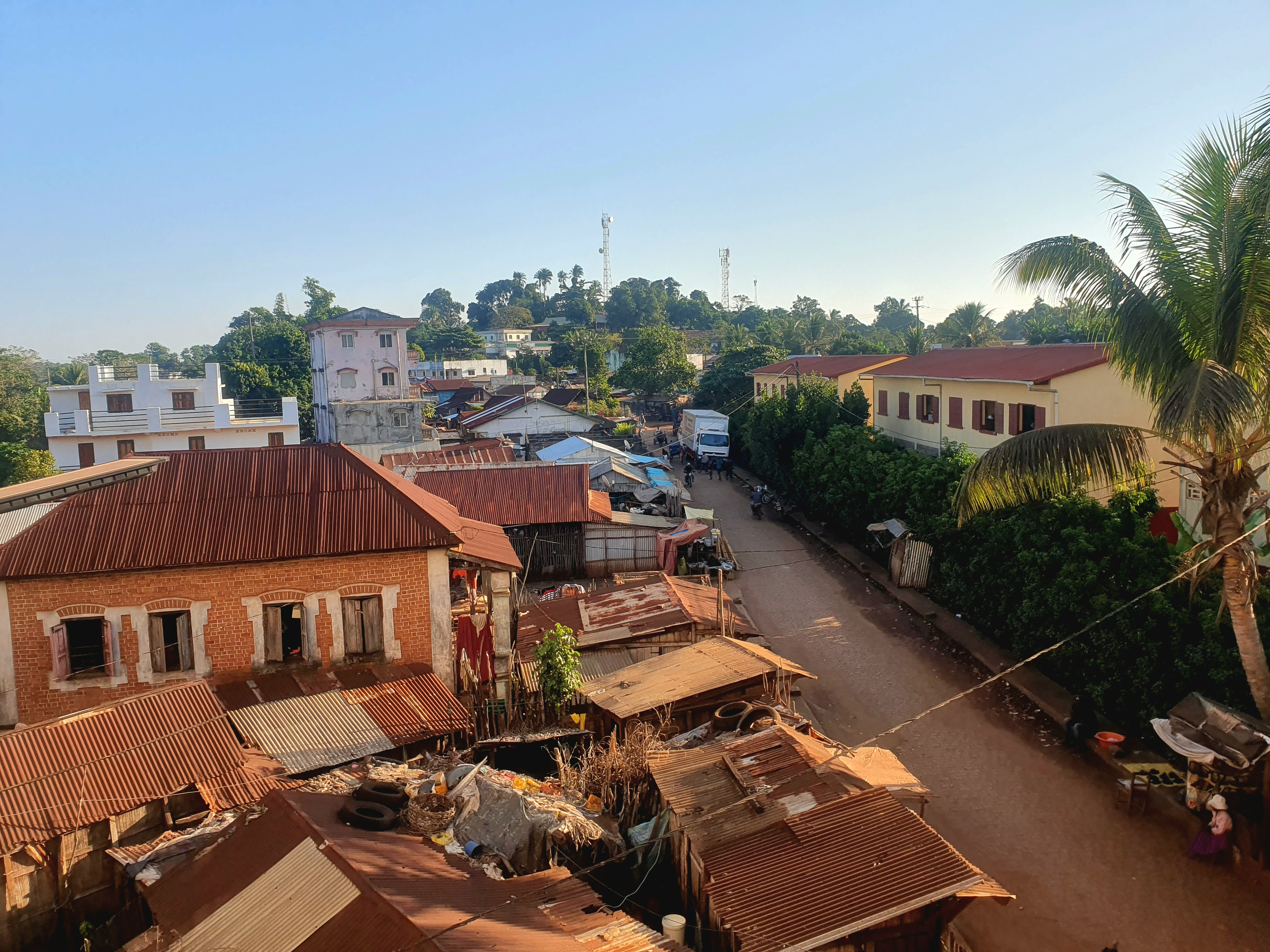
- Vangaindrano

- Location in Madagascar
- Coordinates: 23°21′S 47°36′E
- Country: Madagascar
- Region: Atsimo-Atsinanana
- District: Vangaindrano

Area
  - Total: 4,817 km^{2} (1,860 sq mi)
- Elevation: 9 m (30 ft)

Population (2020)
  - Total: 376,110
  - Density: 78.08/km^{2} (202.2/sq mi)
- Time zone: UTC3 (EAT)
- Postal code: 320

Vangaindrano is a district of Atsimo-Atsinanana in Madagascar. The area is 4,817 km^{2} (1,860 sq mi) and the population was estimated to be 376,110 in 2020.

== Municipalities ==
The district is further divided into 28 municipalities:

- Ambatolava
- Ambongo
- Amparihy Atsinanana
- Ampasimalemy
- Ampataka
- Anilobe
- Bekaraoka
- Bevata
- Fenoambany
- Iara
- Isahara
- Karimbary
- Lohafary
- Lopary
- Manambondro
- Marokibo
- Masianaka
- Matanga
- Ranomena
- Sandravinany
- Soamanova
- Tsianofana
- Tsiately
- Vangaindrano
- Vatanato
- Vohimalaza
- Vohipaho
- Vohitrambo

== Geography ==
Vangaindrano is near the mouth of the Mananara River at the southern part of the east coast.

== Roads ==
It's connected to the north by National Road RN 12 to Farafangana that is situated at a distance of 75 km in the North. The road continues south as National Road 12a to Taolanaro but this section can hardly be by ordinary vehicles, due to its bad condition and lack of bridges..

- RN T18 to Nosifeno and the Midongy Atsimo National Park.

== Nature ==
The Midongy Atsimo National Park is situated at 90 km from Vangaindrano and the Manombo Reserve, halfway to Farafangana.
