= Tsiately =

- Location in Madagascar
- Coordinates: 23°19′S 47°37′E
- Country: Madagascar
- Region: Atsimo-Atsinanana
- District: Vangaindrano
- Elevation: 18 m (59 ft)

Population (2001)
  - Total: 13,000
- Time zone: UTC3 (EAT)

Tsiately is a town and commune in Madagascar. It belongs to the district of Vangaindrano, which is a part of Atsimo-Atsinanana Region. The population of the commune was estimated to be approximately 13,000 in 2001 commune census.

Only primary schooling is available. The majority 98.5% of the population of the commune are farmers. The most important crops are rice and coffee, while other important agricultural products are lychee and cassava. Services provide employment for 1.5% of the population.
