= Fenoambany =

- Location in Madagascar
- Coordinates: 23°49′S 47°33′E
- Country: Madagascar
- Region: Atsimo-Atsinanana
- District: Vangaindrano
- Elevation: 8 m (26 ft)

Population (2001)
  - Total: 7,000
- Time zone: UTC3 (EAT)

Fenoambany is a town and commune in the Madagascar district of Vangaindrano, part of Atsimo-Atsinanana and home to about 7,000 people in the 2001 commune census.

Fenoambany has a primary school. The majority (94%) of the population are farmers. The most important crops are rice and coffee, followed by cloves and black pepper. The service industry employs 1% of the population and fishing 5%.
