= Anilobe =

- Location in Madagascar
- Coordinates: 23°11′S 47°28′E
- Country: Madagascar
- Region: Atsimo-Atsinanana
- District: Vangaindrano
- Elevation: 47 m (154 ft)

Population (2001)
  - Total: 2,000
- Time zone: UTC3 (EAT)

Anilobe is a town and commune in Madagascar. It belongs to the district of Vangaindrano, which is a part of Atsimo-Atsinanana Region. The population of the commune was estimated to be approximately 2,000 in 2001 commune census.

Only primary schooling is available. 96% of the population are farmers, with the remainder providing services. The most important crop is coffee, followed by sugarcane, pepper and rice.
