= Tsianofana =

- Interactive map of Tsianofana
- Country: Madagascar
- Region: Atsimo-Atsinanana
- District: Vangaindrano

Population (2001)
  - Total: 5,000
- Time zone: UTC3 (EAT)

Tsianofana is a town and commune in Madagascar. It belongs to the district of Vangaindrano, which is a part of Atsimo-Atsinanana Region. The population of the commune was estimated to be approximately 5,000 in 2001 commune census.

Only primary schooling is available. 98% of the population of the commune are farmers. The most important crop is cassava, while other important products are sugarcane, sweet potato, rice and breadfruit. Services provide employment for the other 2% of the population.
