= Lohafary =

- Location in Madagascar
- Coordinates: 23°15′S 47°26′E
- Country: Madagascar
- Region: Atsimo-Atsinanana
- District: Vangaindrano
- Elevation: 56 m (184 ft)

Population (2001)
  - Total: 10,000
- Time zone: UTC3 (EAT)

Lohafary is a town and commune in Madagascar. It belongs to the district of Vangaindrano, which is a part of Atsimo-Atsinanana Region. The population of the commune was estimated to be approximately 10,000 in 2001 commune census.

Only primary schooling is available. It is also a site of industrial-scale mining. The majority 99% of the population of the commune are farmers. The most important crops are coffee and rice, while other important agricultural products are sugarcane and cassava. Services provide employment for 1% of the population.
