= Amboropotsy =

- Location in Madagascar
- Coordinates: 24°40′S 44°57′E
- Country: Madagascar
- Region: Atsimo-Andrefana
- District: Ampanihy
- Elevation: 234 m (768 ft)

Population (2001)
  - Total: 13,000
- Time zone: UTC3 (EAT)

Amboropotsy is a town and commune (Malagasy: kaominina) in southwestern Madagascar. It belongs to the district of Ampanihy, which is a part of Atsimo-Andrefana Region. The population of the commune was estimated to be approximately 13,000 in 2001 commune census.

Only primary schooling is available. The majority 70% of the population of the commune are farmers, while an additional 29% receives their livelihood from raising livestock. The most important crop is peanuts, while other important products are maize and cassava. Industry and services provide both employment for 0.5% of the population.
