= Ankiliabo, Ampanihy =

Ankiliabo
- Location in Madagascar
- Coordinates: 24°41′S 44°43′E
- Country: Madagascar
- Region: Atsimo-Andrefana
- District: Ampanihy
- Elevation: 247 m (810 ft)

Population (2001)
  - Total: 9,000
- Time zone: UTC3 (EAT)

Ankiliabo is a town and commune (Malagasy: kaominina) in southwestern Madagascar. It belongs to the district of Ampanihy, which is a part of Atsimo-Andrefana Region. The population of the commune was estimated to be approximately 9,000 in 2001 commune census.

Only primary schooling is available. Farming and raising livestock provides employment for 35% and 60% of the working population. The most important crops are cassava and chickpea; also maize is an important agricultural product. Industry and services provide employment for 1% and 4% of the population, respectively.
