= Ankaizina mine =

Mine in Madagascar

Location
- Location: Atsimo-Atsinanana, Madagascar

Production
- Products: Bauxite

The Ankaizina mine is a large mine in the southern part of Madagascar in Atsimo-Atsinanana. Ankaizina is one of the largest bauxite reserves in Madagascar or all of Africa, having estimated reserves of 55 million tonnes (61,000,000 tons) grading 40.7% aluminium oxide.

== See also ==
- Mining industry of Madagascar
