= Fotadrevo =

- Location in Madagascar
- Coordinates: 24°3′S 45°1′E
- Country: Madagascar
- Region: Atsimo-Andrefana
- District: Ampanihy
- Elevation: 493 m (1,617 ft)

Population (2001)
  - Total: 35,000
  - Ethnicities: Mahafaly
- Time zone: UTC3 (EAT)
- Postal code: 605

Fotadrevo is a rural municipality in southwestern Madagascar. It belongs to the district of Ampanihy, which is a part of Atsimo-Andrefana Region. The population of the commune was estimated to be approximately 35,000.

Primary and junior level secondary education are available in town. The majority 60% of the population of the commune are farmers, while an additional 30% receives their livelihood from raising livestock. The most important crop is rice, while other important products are peanuts, cassava and onions. Industry and services provide employment for 1% and 9% of the population, respectively.

== Infrastructure ==
Fotadrevo is presently not connected to the electric grid. Jirama previews to produce electricity locally by the means of generators and solar from August 2023.

== Mining ==
The Molo mine is situated 11.5 km North-north-east of Fotadrevo.
