= Manantenina =

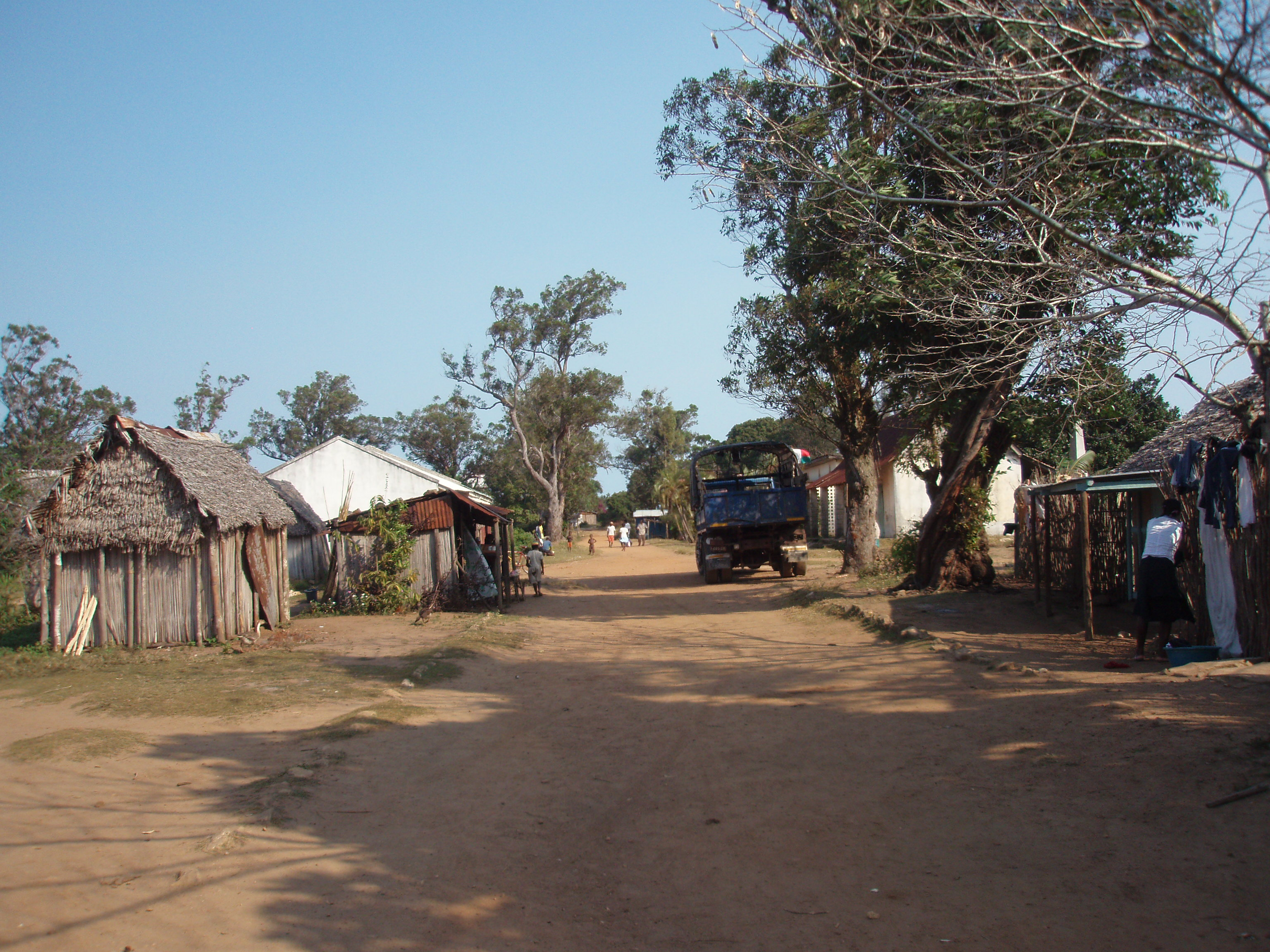
- Manantenina

- Location in Madagascar
- Coordinates: 24°17′S 47°19′E
- Country: Madagascar
- Region: Anosy
- District: Taolanaro

Area
  - Total: 421 km^{2} (163 sq mi)
- Elevation: 16 m (52 ft)

Population (2001)
  - Total: 19,000
- Time zone: UTC3 (EAT)
- Postal code: 614

Manantenina is a rural municipality in Madagascar. It belongs to the district of Taolanaro, which is a part of Anosy Region.

It is situated at the coast of the Indian Ocean at 107 km North of Fort-Dauphin on the unpaved Route nationale 12a.

Manantenina lies at southern banks of the Soavary river. In its south the municipality is also crossed by the Ankaramany river.

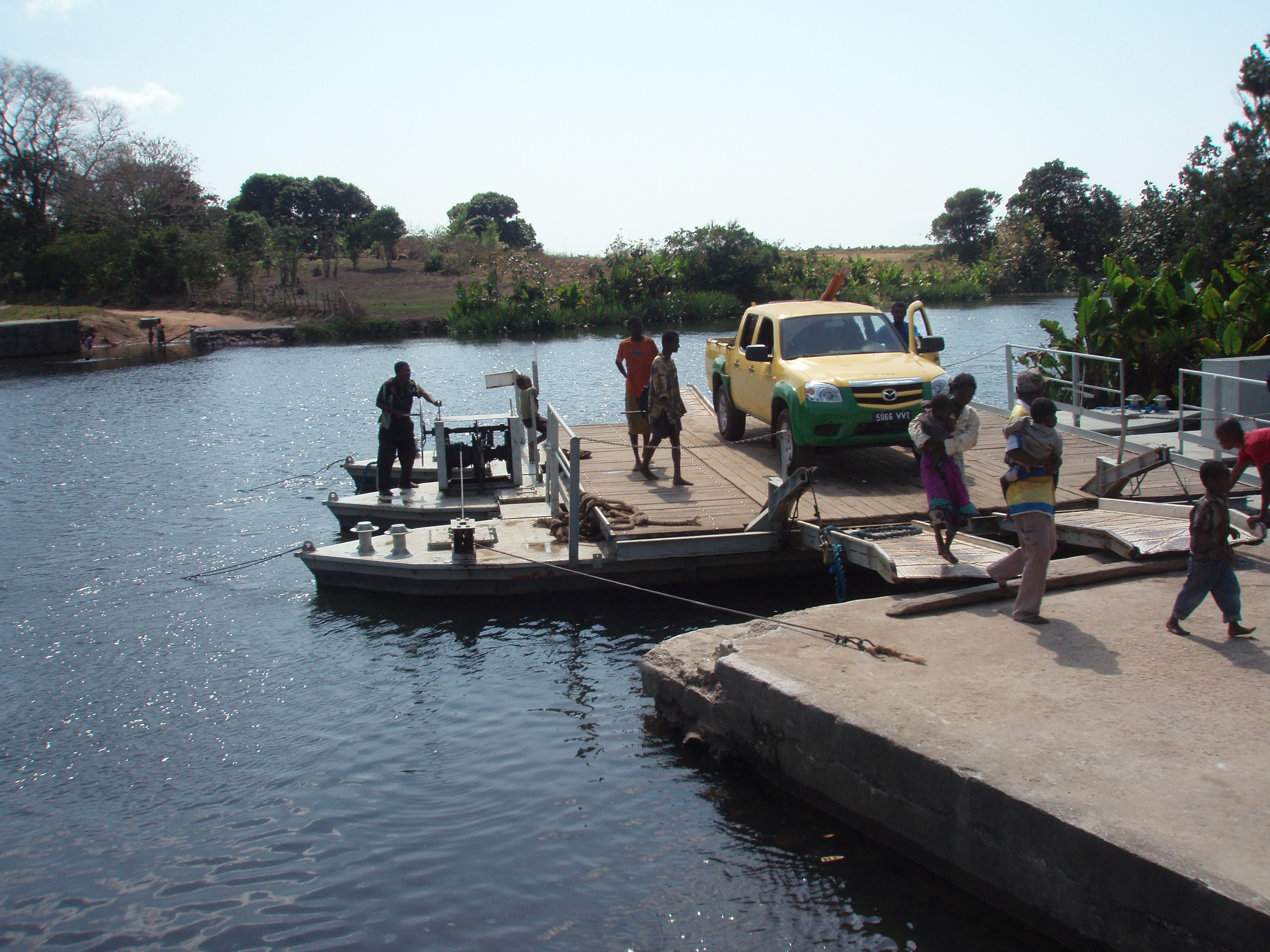
Madagascar national road 12a ferry over the Ankaramany

09 fokontany (villages) are part of this municipality: Manantenina Haut, Manantenina Bas, Ambalateza, Ankarefo, Ampasimasay, Esama, Ankaromanihy, Manambato and Antanintsara. The population of the commune was estimated to be approximately 19,000 in 2001 commune census.

Primary and junior level secondary education are available in town. The majority 50% of the population works in fishing. 35% are farmers, while an additional 10% receives their livelihood from raising livestock. The most important crop is cassava, while other important products are sweet potatoes and rice. Services provide employment for 5% of the population.

== Mining ==
- the Manantenina mine, a bauxit deposit that is not yet exploited.
