= Ranobe mine =

Titanium mine in Melaky, Madagascar

- Location: Melaky, Madagascar
- Products: Titanium

The Ranobe mine is one of the largest titanium mines in Madagascar. The mine is located in Melaky. The mine has reserves amounting to 959 million tonnes of ore grading 5.8% titanium.

== See also ==
- Mining industry of Madagascar
