= Beahitse =

- Location in Madagascar
- Coordinates: 24°10′S 44°26′E
- Country: Madagascar
- Region: Atsimo-Andrefana
- District: Ampanihy
- Elevation: 320 m (1,050 ft)

Population (2001)
  - Total: 17,000
- Time zone: UTC3 (EAT)

Beahitse is a town and commune (Malagasy: kaominina) in southwestern Madagascar. It belongs to the district of Ampanihy, which is a part of Atsimo-Andrefana Region. The population of the commune was estimated to be approximately 17,000 in 2001 commune census.

Only primary schooling is available. It is also a site of industrial-scale mining. The majority 90% of the population of the commune are farmers, while an additional 5% receives their livelihood from raising livestock. The most important crop is maize, while other important products are peanuts, cassava and sweet potatoes. Industry and services provide employment for 1% and 4% of the population, respectively.
