= Itampolo =

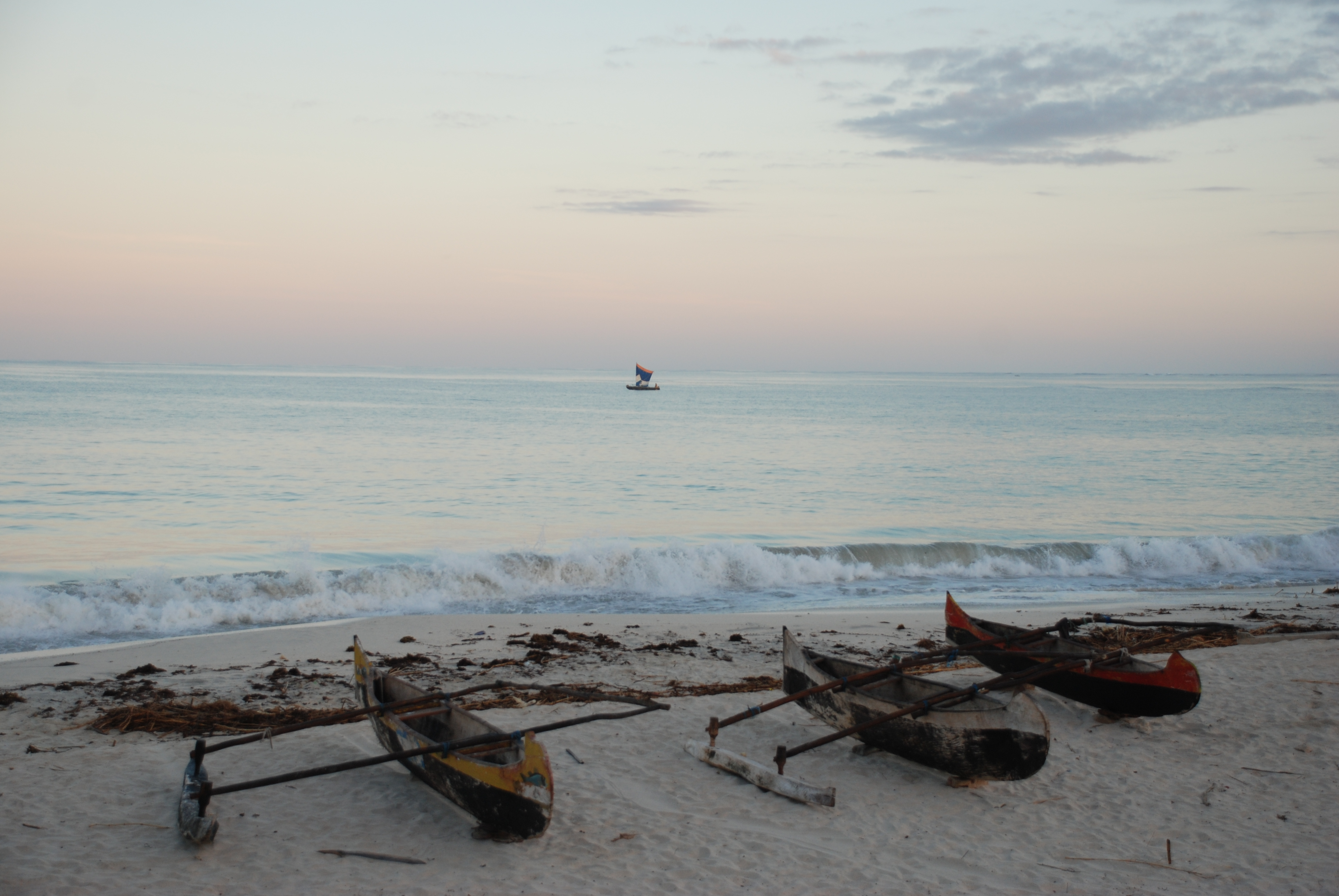
- Itampolo

- Location in Madagascar
- Coordinates: 24°41′S 43°57′E
- Country: Madagascar
- Region: Atsimo-Andrefana
- District: Ampanihy
- Elevation: 19 m (62 ft)

Population (2001)
  - Total: 32,000
- Time zone: UTC3 (EAT)

Itampolo is a town and commune (Malagasy: kaominina) in southwestern Madagascar. It belongs to the district of Ampanihy, which is a part of Atsimo-Andrefana Region. The population of the commune was estimated to be approximately 32,000 in 2001 commune census.

Only primary schooling is available. The majority 60% of the population of the commune are farmers, while an additional 20% receives their livelihood from raising livestock. The most important crops are cassava and peas, while other important agricultural products are maize and sweet potatoes. Services provide employment for 5% of the population. Additionally fishing employs 15% of the population.
