= Vohitany =

- Location in Madagascar
- Coordinates: 24°8′S 44°46′E
- Country: Madagascar
- Region: Atsimo-Andrefana
- District: Ampanihy
- Elevation: 378 m (1,240 ft)

Population (2001)
  - Total: 10,000
- Time zone: UTC3 (EAT)

Vohitany is a town and commune (Malagasy: kaominina) in southwestern Madagascar. It belongs to the district of Ampanihy, which is a part of Atsimo-Andrefana Region. The population of the commune was estimated to be approximately 10,000 in 2001 commune census.

Only primary schooling is available. It is also a site of industrial-scale mining. The majority 70% of the population of the commune are farmers, while an additional 20% receives their livelihood from raising livestock. The most important crops are cassava and peanuts, while other important agricultural products are sweet potatoes and rice. Industry and services provide employment for 1% and 9% of the population, respectively.
