= Beroy Sud =

- Location in Madagascar
- Coordinates: 23°59′S 44°40′E
- Country: Madagascar
- Region: Atsimo-Andrefana
- District: Ampanihy
- Elevation: 421 m (1,381 ft)

Population (2001)
  - Total: 15,000
- Time zone: UTC3 (EAT)

Beroy Sud is a town and commune (Malagasy: kaominina) in southwestern Madagascar. It belongs to the district of Ampanihy, which is a part of Atsimo-Andrefana Region. The population of the commune was estimated to be approximately 15,000 in 2001 commune census.

Only primary schooling is available. The majority 80% of the population of the commune are farmers, while an additional 2% receives their livelihood from raising livestock. The most important crop is peanuts, while other important products are cassava and rice. Services provide employment for 18% of the population.
