= Ampasimalemy =

Coordinates: 23.3422°S 47.5785°E

- Interactive map of Ampasimalemy
- Country: Madagascar
- Region: Atsimo-Atsinanana
- District: Vangaindrano

Population (2001)
  - Total: 8,000
- Time zone: UTC3 (EAT)

Ampasimalemy is a town and commune in Madagascar. It belongs to the district of Vangaindrano, which is a part of Atsimo-Atsinanana Region. The population of the commune was estimated to be approximately 8,000 in 2001 commune census.

Only primary schooling is available. The majority 97% of the population of the commune are farmers. The most important crops are rice and coffee, while other important agricultural products are sugarcane and cassava. Services provide employment for 3% of the population.
