= Ampataka =

- Location in Madagascar
- Coordinates: 23°21′S 47°28′E
- Country: Madagascar
- Region: Atsimo-Atsinanana
- District: Vangaindrano
- Elevation: 46 m (151 ft)

Population (2001)
  - Total: 19,000
- Time zone: UTC3 (EAT)

Ampataka is a town and commune in Madagascar. It belongs to the district of Vangaindrano, which is a part of Atsimo-Atsinanana Region. The population of the commune was estimated to be approximately 19,000 in 2001 commune census.

Only primary schooling is available. It is also a site of industrial-scale mining. The majority 93% of the population of the commune are farmers, while an additional 1% receives their livelihood from raising livestock. The most important crops are cassava and coffee, while other important agricultural products are pepper and rice. Industry and services provide employment for 1% and 5% of the population, respectively.
