= Karimbary =

- Location in Madagascar
- Coordinates: 23°18′S 47°35′E
- Country: Madagascar
- Region: Atsimo-Atsinanana
- District: Vangaindrano
- Elevation: 22 m (72 ft)

Population (2001)
  - Total: 4,000
- Time zone: UTC3 (EAT)

Karimbary is a town and commune in Madagascar. It belongs to the district of Vangaindrano, which is a part of Atsimo-Atsinanana Region. The population of the commune was estimated to be approximately 4,000 in 2001 commune census.

Only primary schooling is available. The majority 98% of the population of the commune are farmers. The most important crop is rice, while other important products are coffee, sugarcane and cassava. Services provide employment for 2% of the population.
