= Maniry =

- Location in Madagascar
- Coordinates: 24°30′S 44°49′E
- Country: Madagascar
- Region: Atsimo-Andrefana
- District: Ampanihy
- Elevation: 292 m (958 ft)

Population (2001)
  - Total: 7,000
- Time zone: UTC3 (EAT)

Maniry is a town and commune (Malagasy: kaominina) in southwestern Madagascar. It belongs to the district of Ampanihy, which is a part of Atsimo-Andrefana Region. The population of the commune was estimated to be approximately 7,000 in 2001 commune census.

Only primary schooling is available. It is also a site of industrial-scale mining. The majority 95% of the population of the commune are farmers, while an additional 3% receives their livelihood from raising livestock. The most important crop is rice, while other important products are peanuts, maize and cassava. Industry and services provide employment for 0.5% and 1% of the population, respectively. Additionally fishing employs 0.5% of the population.
