= Gogogogo =

- Location in Madagascar
- Coordinates: 24°16′S 44°48′E
- Country: Madagascar
- Region: Atsimo-Andrefana
- District: Ampanihy
- Elevation: 341 m (1,119 ft)

Population (2019)Census
  - Total: 19,454
- Time zone: UTC3 (EAT)

Gogogogo is a rural municipality in southwestern Madagascar. It belongs to the district of Ampanihy, which is a part of Atsimo-Andrefana. The population of the municipality was 20,021 in 2023.

Only primary schooling is available. About 60% of the population are farmers, while an additional 15% make their livelihood from raising livestock. The most important crop is cassava, while other important products are peanuts, maize, sweet potatoes and cowpeas. Services provide employment for 25% of the population. There are also some mineral resources in the area.
