= Soamanova =

- Location in Madagascar
- Coordinates: 23°17′S 47°36′E
- Country: Madagascar
- Region: Atsimo-Atsinanana
- District: Vangaindrano
- Elevation: 19 m (62 ft)

Population (2001)
  - Total: 11,000
- Time zone: UTC3 (EAT)

Soamanova is a town and commune in Madagascar. It belongs to the district of Vangaindrano, which is a part of Atsimo-Atsinanana Region. The population of the commune was estimated to be approximately 11,000 in 2001 commune census.

Only primary schooling is available. The town has a permanent court. The majority 98% of the population of the commune are farmers. The most important crops are rice and cloves, while other important agricultural products are sugarcane, cassava and barley cinnamon. Services provide employment for 2% of the population.
