= Bevata =

- Location in Madagascar
- Coordinates: 23°17′S 47°17′E
- Country: Madagascar
- Region: Atsimo-Atsinanana
- District: Vangaindrano
- Elevation: 136 m (446 ft)

Population (2001)
  - Total: 11,000
- Time zone: UTC3 (EAT)

Bevata is a town and commune in Madagascar. It belongs to the district of Vangaindrano, which is a part of Atsimo-Atsinanana Region. The population of the commune was estimated to be approximately 11,000 in 2001 commune census.

Only primary schooling is available. It is also a site of industrial-scale mining. The majority 94% of the population of the commune are farmers, while an additional 1% receives their livelihood from raising livestock. The most important crops are rice and coffee, while other important agricultural products are bananas, cassava and pepper. Industry and services provide employment for 1% and 4% of the population, respectively.
