= Ankilizato, Ampanihy =

Ankilizato
- Location in Madagascar
- Coordinates: 24°29′S 44°45′E
- Country: Madagascar
- Region: Atsimo-Andrefana
- District: Ampanihy
- Elevation: 280 m (920 ft)

Population (2001)
  - Total: 7,000
- Time zone: UTC3 (EAT)

Ankilizato is a town and commune (Malagasy: kaominina) in southwestern Madagascar. It belongs to the district of Ampanihy, which is a part of Atsimo-Andrefana Region. The population of the commune was estimated to be approximately 7,000 in 2001 commune census.

Only primary schooling is available. The majority 75% of the population of the commune are farmers, while an additional 24% receives their livelihood from raising livestock. The most important crops are maize and peanuts; also cassava is an important agricultural product. Services provide employment for 1% of the population.
