= Lopary =

- Location in Madagascar
- Coordinates: 23°11′S 47°40′E
- Country: Madagascar
- Region: Atsimo-Atsinanana
- District: Vangaindrano
- Elevation: 7 m (23 ft)

Population (2001)
  - Total: 24,000
- Time zone: UTC3 (EAT)

Lopary is a town and commune in Madagascar. It belongs to the district of Vangaindrano, which is a part of Atsimo-Atsinanana Region. The population of the commune was estimated to be approximately 24,000 in 2001 commune census.

Primary and junior level secondary education are available in town. The majority 96% of the population of the commune are farmers. The most important crops are cassava and rice; also coffee is an important agricultural product. Services provide employment for 2% of the population. Additionally fishing employs 2% of the population.
