= Ankilimivory =

- Location in Madagascar
- Coordinates: 24°28′S 44°58′E
- Country: Madagascar
- Region: Atsimo-Andrefana
- District: Ampanihy
- Elevation: 331 m (1,086 ft)

Population (2001)
  - Total: 15,000
- Time zone: UTC3 (EAT)

Ankilimivory is a town and commune (Malagasy: kaominina) in southwestern Madagascar. It belongs to the district of Ampanihy, which is a part of Atsimo-Andrefana Region. The population of the commune was estimated to be approximately 15,000 in 2001 commune census.

Only primary schooling is available. The majority 90% of the population of the commune are farmers, while an additional 6% receives their livelihood from raising livestock. The most important crops are maize and peanuts; also cassava is an important agricultural product. Services provide employment for 3% of the population. Additionally fishing employs 1% of the population.
