= Isahara =

- Location in Madagascar
- Coordinates: 23°43′S 47°21′E
- Country: Madagascar
- Region: Atsimo-Atsinanana
- District: Vangaindrano
- Elevation: 34 m (112 ft)

Population (2001)
  - Total: 10,000
- Time zone: UTC3 (EAT)

Isahara is a town and commune in Madagascar. It belongs to the district of Vangaindrano, which is a part of Atsimo-Atsinanana Region. The population of the commune was estimated to be approximately 10,000 according to the 2001 commune census.

Only primary schooling is available. About 99% of the population of the commune are farmers. The most important crop is rice, while other important products are sugarcane, cassava and sweet potatoes. Additionally, fishing employs 1% of the population.
