= Farafangana mine =

Bauxite mine in Madagascar

- Location: Atsimo-Atsinanana, Madagascar
- Products: Bauxite

The Farafangana mine is a large mine located in the southern part of Madagascar in Atsimo-Atsinanana. Farafangana represents one of the largest bauxite reserves in Madagascar and one of the largest in Africa, having estimated reserves of 100 million tonnes grading 37% aluminium oxide.

== See also ==
- Mining industry of Madagascar
