= Vohimalaza =

- Location in Madagascar
- Coordinates: 23°43′S 47°27′E
- Country: Madagascar
- Region: Atsimo-Atsinanana
- District: Vangaindrano
- Elevation: 20 m (66 ft)

Population (2001)
  - Total: 7,000
- Time zone: UTC3 (EAT)

Vohimalaza is a town and commune in Madagascar. It belongs to the district of Vangaindrano, which is a part of Atsimo-Atsinanana Region. The population of the commune was estimated to be approximately 7,000 in 2001 commune census.

Only primary schooling is available. The majority 95% of the population of the commune are farmers. The most important crop is cassava, while other important products are coffee, cloves, sweet potatoes and rice. Services provide employment for 5% of the population.
