= Matanga, Madagascar =

Masianaka in Atsimo-Atsinanana, Madagascar masianaka town and commune v

Matanga
- Location in Madagascar
- Coordinates: 23°31′S 47°33′E
- Country: Madagascar
- Region: Atsimo-Atsinanana
- District: Vangaindrano
- Elevation: 8 m (26 ft)

Population (2001)
  - Total: 21,000
- Time zone: UTC3 (EAT)

Matanga is a town and commune in Madagascar. It belongs to the district of Vangaindrano, which is a part of Atsimo-Atsinanana Region. The population of the commune was estimated to be approximately 21,000 in 2001 commune census.

Primary and junior level secondary education are available in town. The majority 95% of the population of the commune are farmers. The most important crops are rice and cloves, while other important agricultural products are coffee and cassava. Services provide employment for 5% of the population.
