= Antaly =

- Location in Madagascar
- Coordinates: 24°23′S 44°24′E
- Country: Madagascar
- Region: Atsimo-Andrefana
- District: Ampanihy
- Elevation: 314 m (1,030 ft)

Population (2001)
  - Total: 9,000
- Time zone: UTC3 (EAT)

Antaly is a town and commune (Malagasy: kaominina) in southwestern Madagascar. It belongs to the district of Ampanihy, which is a part of Atsimo-Andrefana Region. The population of the commune was estimated to be approximately 9,000 in 2001 commune census.

Only primary schooling is available. The majority 60% of the population of the commune are farmers, while an additional 38% receives their livelihood from raising livestock. The most important crop is cassava, while other important products are sugarcane, sweet potatoes and rice. Services provide employment for 2% of the population.
