= Manantenina mine =

Bauxite mine in Madagascar

- Location: Anosy Region, Madagascar
- Products: Bauxite

The Manantenina mine is a large mine located in the southern part of Madagascar in Anosy Region. Manantenina represents one of the largest bauxite reserve in Madagascar and one of the largest in Africa, having estimated reserves of 165 million tonnes grading 41% aluminium oxide.

== See also ==
- Mining industry of Madagascar
