= Mananara River =

River in Eastern Madagascar

Coordinates: 23°20′30″S 47°42′00″E

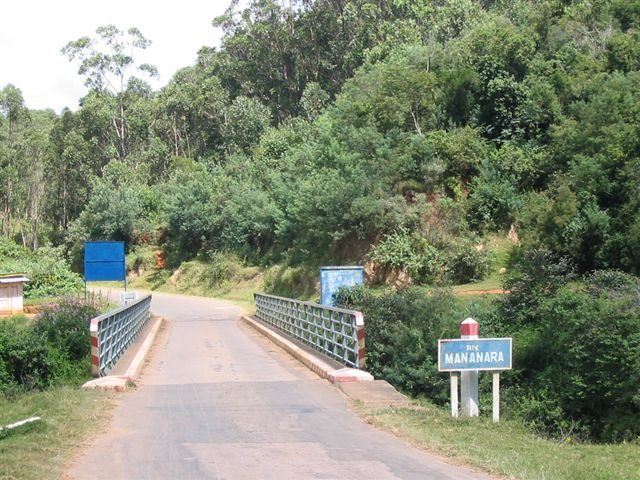
- The Mananara river, near Anjozorobe

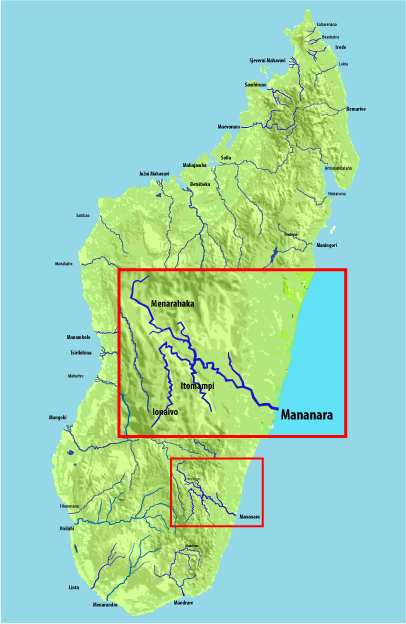
- Mananara River

Location
- Country: Madagascar

Physical characteristics
- Mouth: Indian Ocean
  - location: Vangaindrano
  - elevation: 0 m (0 ft)
- Length: 150 km (93 mi)
- Basin size: 16,760 km^{2} (6,470 sq mi)
- Discharge
  - location: Near mouth
  - average: (Period: 1971–2000)244.2 m^{3}/s (8,620 cu ft/s)

Basin features
- River system: Mananara River

The Mananara River is one of the main rivers in eastern Madagascar. Its mouth is located at the Indian Ocean near the city of Vangaindrano in the Atsimo-Atsinanana region.

The Mananara South is formed by the merger of the Menarahaka, Itomampy, and Ionaivo. The Ionaivo rises on the slopes of Tsimahamory peak, at an approximate elevation of 1500m. The Itomampy rises not far from the Ionaivo, about 40 km from the Indian Ocean, at approximately 1600m, and runs north until it joins the Ionaivo. The Menarahaka rises in the Andringitra massif, at approximately 2000m elevation. It is joined by the Sahambano before joining the Ionaivo.
