= Beara, Jamalpur =

Bangladeshi village

Coordinates: 24.829183°N 90.959530°E

Beara (also Biara) is a small village of Jamalpur Sadar Upazila in Jamalpur District, Bangladesh. It has a population of around 1100. A branch of Brahmaputra has crossed the village. Presently this village has a government primary school, a high school, a mosque, and a village market called Biara Bazar. Most of the villagers are farmers. They normally grow rice, vegetables etc.
