= Beara, Ampanihy =

Beara
- Location in Madagascar
- Coordinates: 24°4′S 45°18′E
- Country: Madagascar
- Region: Atsimo-Andrefana
- District: Ampanihy Ouest (district)
- Elevation: 321 m (1,053 ft)

Population (2018)Census
  - Total: 3,901
  - Ethnicities: Mahafaly
- Time zone: UTC3 (EAT)
- Postal code: 605

Beara is a rural municipality in Ampanihy Ouest (district) in Atsimo-Andrefana, Madagascar.

== Rivers ==
It is on the Linta River that flooded the village in 1968, 1981 and 2005.
