= Amparihy Est =

- Location in Madagascar
- Coordinates: 23°57′S 47°2′E
- Country: Madagascar
- Region: Atsimo-Atsinanana
- District: Vangaindrano
- Elevation: 1,167 m (3,829 ft)

Population (2001)
  - Total: 14,000
- Time zone: UTC3 (EAT)

Amparihy Est is a town and commune in Madagascar. It belongs to the district of Vangaindrano, which is a part of Atsimo-Atsinanana Region. The population of the commune was estimated to be approximately 14,000 in 2001 commune census.

Only primary schooling is available. The majority 98% of the population of the commune are farmers. The most important crop is coffee, while other important products are sugarcane, cassava and rice. Services provide employment for 2% of the population.
