= Molo mine =

Graphite mine in Madagascar

- Location within Madagascar
- Location: Fotadrevo, Atsimo-Andrefana, Madagascar; 24.0019°S 45.1304°E
- Products: Graphite
- Opened: 2021
- Company: NextSource Materials Inc.
- Website: www.nextsourcematerials.com/graphite/molo-graphite-project/

The Molo mine is one of the largest graphite mines in Madagascar. The mine is located in Atsimo-Andrefana, near the town of Fotadrevo. The deposit was discovered in 2011, following explorations of the nearby Green Giant mine. The mine has reserves amounting to 120 million tonnes of ore grading 8% graphite metal. The mine is owned by NextSource Materials Inc, which obtained a 40-year mining license from the Madagascar government in 2019. The mine is being financed by Vision Blue Resources Limited, a battery materials investment company founded by Mick Davis. The mine has agreements to supply graphite to ThyssenKrupp, and intends to build a graphite battery anodes to sell to Tesla. As of 2021, the necessary equipment for the mine is in the process of being assembled and delivered.

In 2023 the mine opened its own energy production with a solar park of 2.6 MW capacity and a thermal generator of 3.1 Mw.
