= Ampanihy Ouest District =

Ampanihy Ouest district Ampanihy Andrefana district
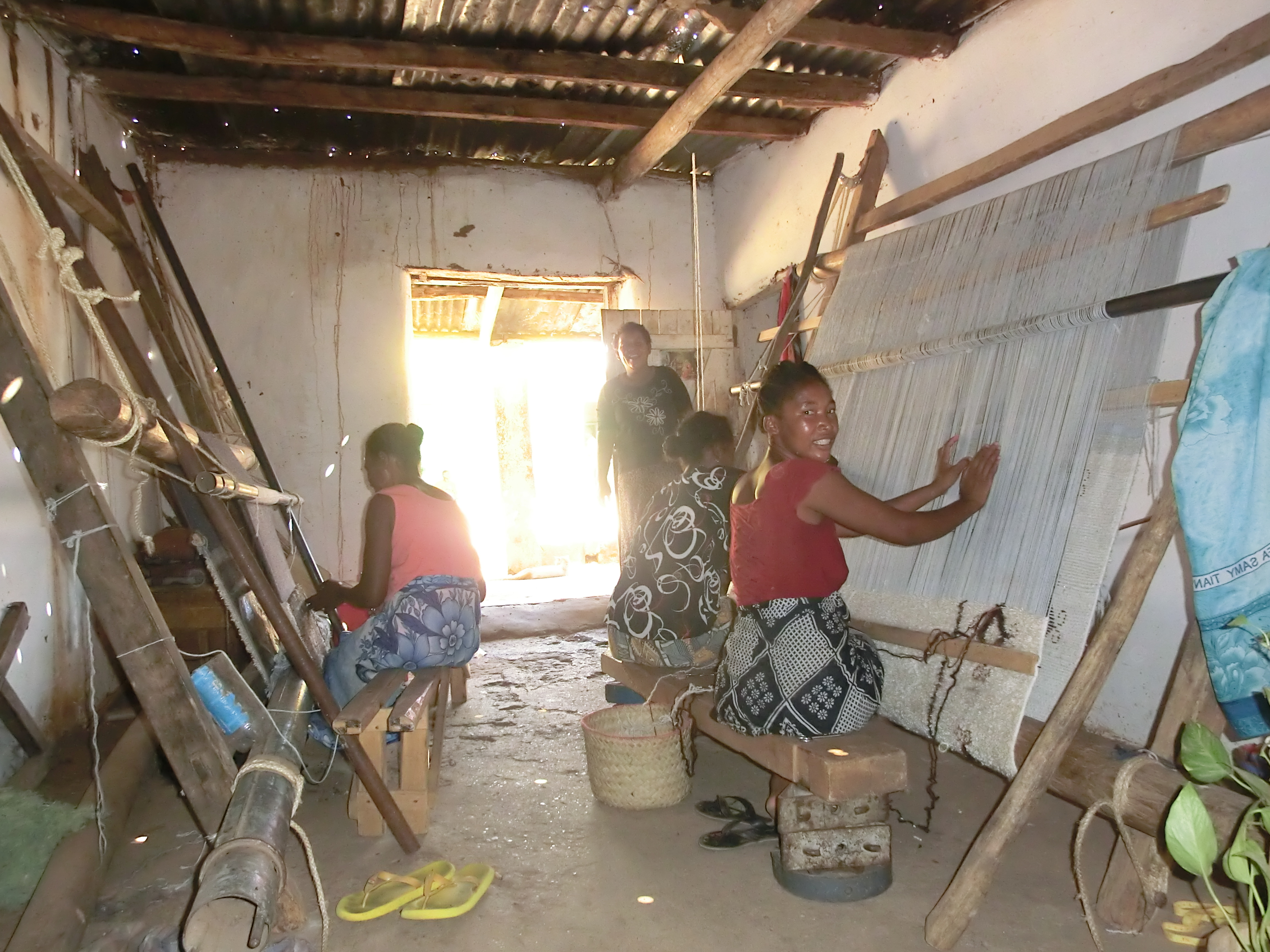
- weaving women in Ampanihy

- Location in Madagascar
- Coordinates: 24°41′S 44°45′E
- Country: Madagascar
- Region: Atsimo-Andrefana
- District: Ampanihy Ouest (district)

Population (2018)Census
  - Total: 398.995
- Time zone: UTC3 (EAT)
- Postal code: 605

Ampanihy Ouest (Ampanihy Andrefana district) is a district of Atsimo-Andrefana in Madagascar.

== Communes ==
The district is further divided into 20 communes:

- Agnavoha
- Amboropotsy
- Ampanihy
- Androka
- Androimpana
- Ankiliabo
- Ankilimivory
- Ankiliabo
- Ankilizato
- Antaly
- Beara
- Beahitse
- Belafike
- Beroy Sud
- Ejeda
- Fotadrevo
- Gogogogo
- Itampolo
- Maniry
- Vohitany

== Mining ==
In Fotadrevo there is presently a graphite mine under construction.
