= Sandravinany =

- Location in Madagascar
- Coordinates: 24°2′S 47°26′E
- Country: Madagascar
- Region: Atsimo-Atsinanana
- District: Vangaindrano

Area
  - Total: 380 km^{2} (150 sq mi)
- Elevation: 14 m (46 ft)

Population (2001)
  - Total: 10,000
- Time zone: UTC3 (EAT)

Sandravinany is a rural municipality in Madagascar. It belongs to the district of Vangaindrano, which is a part of Atsimo-Atsinanana Region. The population of the commune was estimated to be approximately 10,000 in 2001 commune census.

Only primary schooling is available. The majority 90% of the population works in fishing. 9% are farmers. The most important crop is cassava, while other important products are sweet potatoes and rice. Services provide employment for 1% of the population.

Situated on the seashore the municipality has beaches over 18km. It produced 47 tons of lobsters in 2017.
