= Green Giant mine =

Vanadium mine in Madagascar

- Location in Madagascar
- Location: Betioky Sud, Atsimo-Andrefana, Madagascar; 24.01°S 45.05°E
- Products: Vanadium
- Company: NextSource Materials Inc.
- Website: www.nextsourcematerials.com/vanadium/green-giant-vanadium-project/

The Green Giant mine is one of the largest vanadium mines in Madagascar. The mine is located in Betioky Sud in Atsimo-Andrefana. The mine has reserves amounting to 59.2 million tonnes of ore grading 0.68% vanadium. In August of 2007, the Canadian company Uranium Star Corp announced an agreement where it would buy a 75% ownership stake in the mine from Madagascar Minerals and Resources Sarl, and then bought full ownership in 2009. An aerial survey was conducted in 2007 and samples were drilled in 2008. Uranium Star Corp rebranded as Energizer Resources Inc in December 2009, and then as NextSource Materials Inc in April 2017. The mine is 11 kilometers from the Molo mine, which is also owned by NextSource.
