= Ambohimanambola, Betafo =

Ambohimanambola
- Location in Madagascar
- Coordinates: 19°48′S 46°37′E
- Country: Madagascar
- Region: Vakinankaratra
- District: Betafo
- Elevation: 1,224 m (4,016 ft)

Population (2001)
  - Total: 21,000
  - Ethnicities: Merina
- Time zone: UTC3 (EAT)

Ambohimanambola is a town and commune in Madagascar. It belongs to the district of Betafo, which is a part of Vakinankaratra Region. The population of the commune was estimated to be approximately 21,000 in 2001 commune census.

Primary and junior level secondary education are available in town. The majority 70% of the population of the commune are farmers, while an additional 30% receives their livelihood from raising livestock. The most important crops are rice and beans, while other important agricultural products are maize, cassava and bambara groundnut.
