= Vangaindrano =

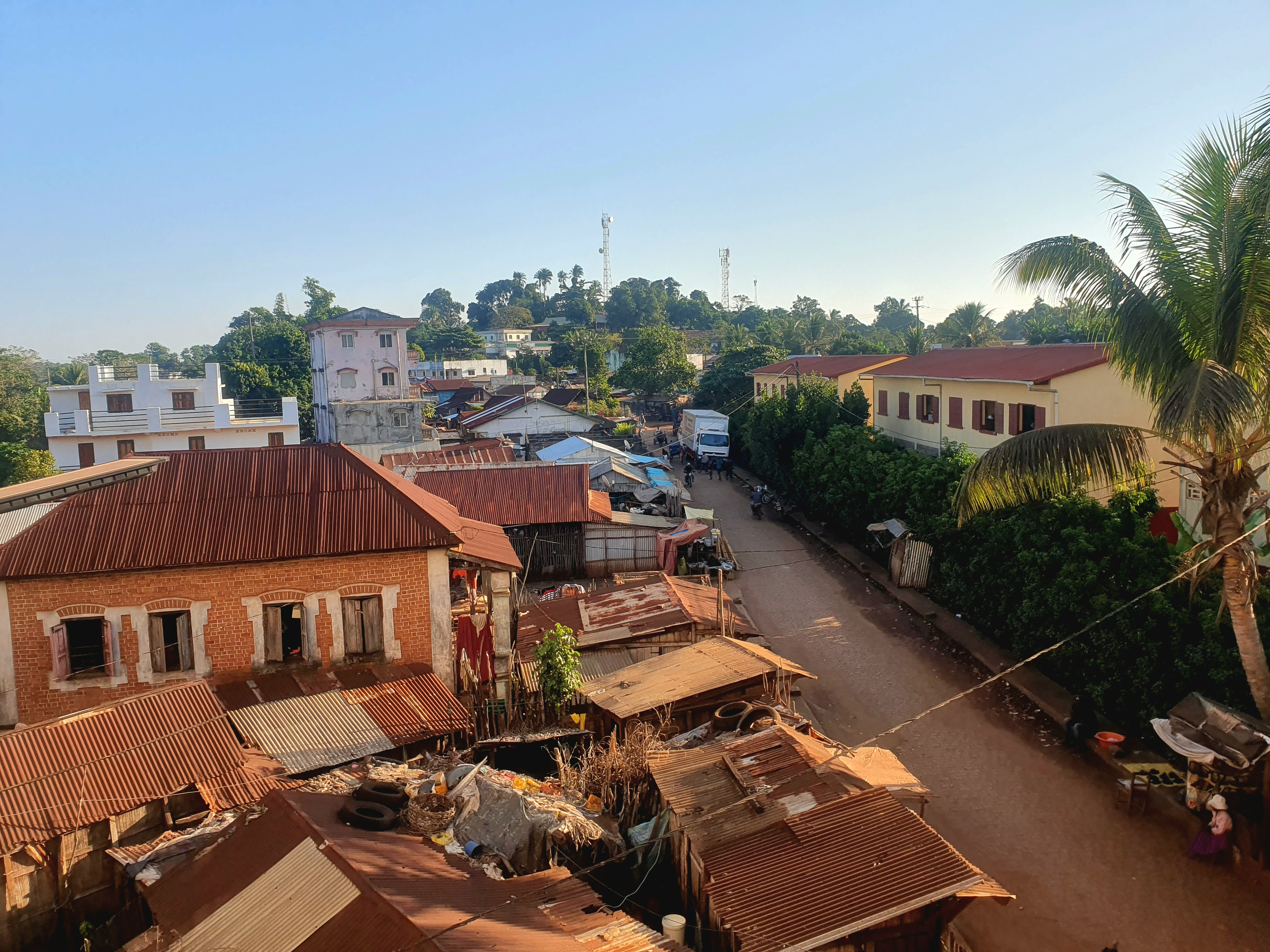
- Vangaindrano

- Location in Madagascar
- Coordinates: 23°21′S 47°36′E
- Country: Madagascar
- Region: Atsimo-Atsinanana
- District: Vangaindrano

Area
  - Total: 56 km^{2} (22 sq mi)
- Elevation: 9 m (30 ft)

Population (2018)
  - Total: 38,537
- Time zone: UTC3 (EAT)
- Postal code: 320

Vangaindrano is a town and a district in Atsimo-Atsinanana Region, Madagascar with a population of 38,537 (2018).

== Geography ==
The town is near the mouth of the Mananara River at the southern part of the east coast.

It's connected to the north by National Road RN 12 to Farafangana that is situated at a distance of 75 km in the North. The road continues south as National Road 12a but this section can hardly be by ordinary vehicles, due to its bad condition and lack of bridges.

== Nature ==
The Midongy Atsimo National Park is situated at 90 km from Vangaindrano and the Manombo Reserve, halfway to Farafangana.
