= Islam in Madagascar =

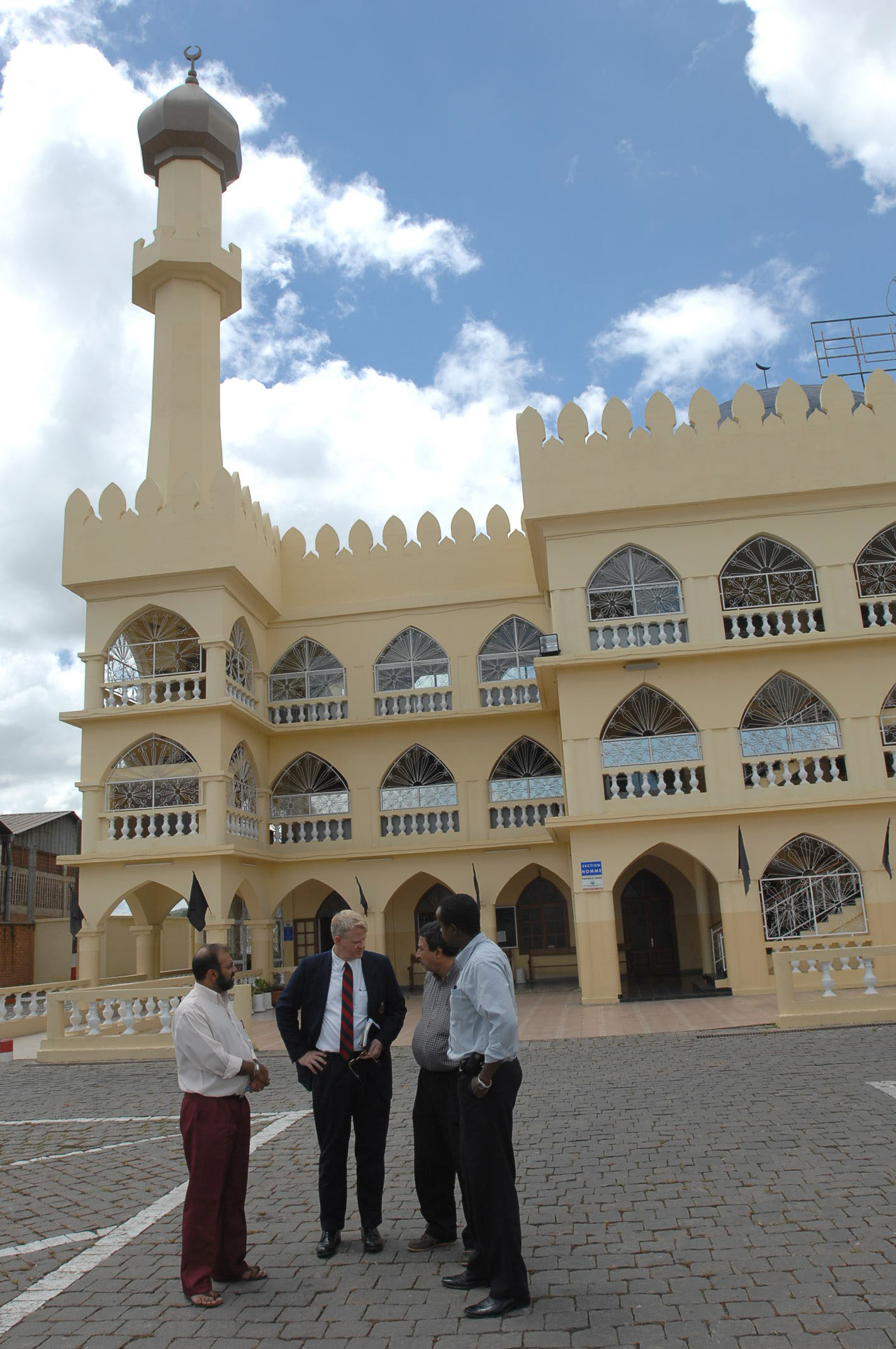
A mosque in Antananarivo.

Ethnicity of Madagascan Muslims (2021 estimate)
1. Malagasy (65.0%)
2. Other ethnic groups (35.0%)

Islam in Madagascar is a minority religion, with most Malagasy people adhering to Christianity. Due to the secular nature of Madagascar's constitution, Muslims are free to proselytize and build mosques in the country.

Islam has been well established in what is now known as Madagascar for centuries and today Muslims represent 2 to 5 percent of the total population. The vast majority of Muslims in Madagascar practice Sunni Islam of the Shafi school of jurisprudence, with sizeable Shia communities.

== Demographics ==
Followers constitute approximately 2 to 7 percent of the population as of 2021. In 2011, scholar Sigvard von Sicard estimated that between 5 and 7 percent of the population was Muslim while indicating that the number might be higher due to the social fluidity of the area. The majority of the Muslims of Madagascar live in the northwestern regions of the country. A few also reside in the southeastern coast of Madagascar. Most Muslims in Madagascar are native Malagasy peoples. Other Muslim groups in the country include South Asians (such as Indians and Pakistanis), Comorians and other Africans.

=== Conversions ===
There is a growing number of ethnic Malagasy converts to Islam in Madagascar. It is hypothesized that several hundred thousand Malagasy convert to Islam each year.

== History ==
=== Settlement of Arabs ===
Beginning in the 10th and 11th centuries, Arab sailors worked their way down the east coast of Africa in their dhows and established settlements and trading posts on the west coast of Madagascar. Muslim geographer Al-Idrīsī gave a detailed description of Madagascar in his works. One of the most noteworthy early settlers were the Zafiraminia, traditional ancestors of the Antemoro, Antanosy and other east coast ethnicities. The last wave of Arab immigrants would be the Antalaotra who immigrated from eastern African colonies. They settled the north-west of the island (Majunga area) and were the first to actually bring Islam to the island.

Arab Muslim immigrants were few in total number compared to the Indonesians and Bantus, but they left a lasting impression. The Malagasy names for seasons, months, days, and coins are Islamic in origin, as is the practice of circumcision, the communal grain pool, and different forms of salutation. The Arab magicians, known as the ombiasy, established themselves in the courts of many Malagasy tribal kingdoms. Sorabe is an alphabet based on Arabic used to transcribe the Malagasy language and the Antemoro dialect in particular. The Arabs were also the first to correctly identify the origin of most Malagasy by suggesting that the island was colonized by the Indonesians.

=== Colonization and Independence ===
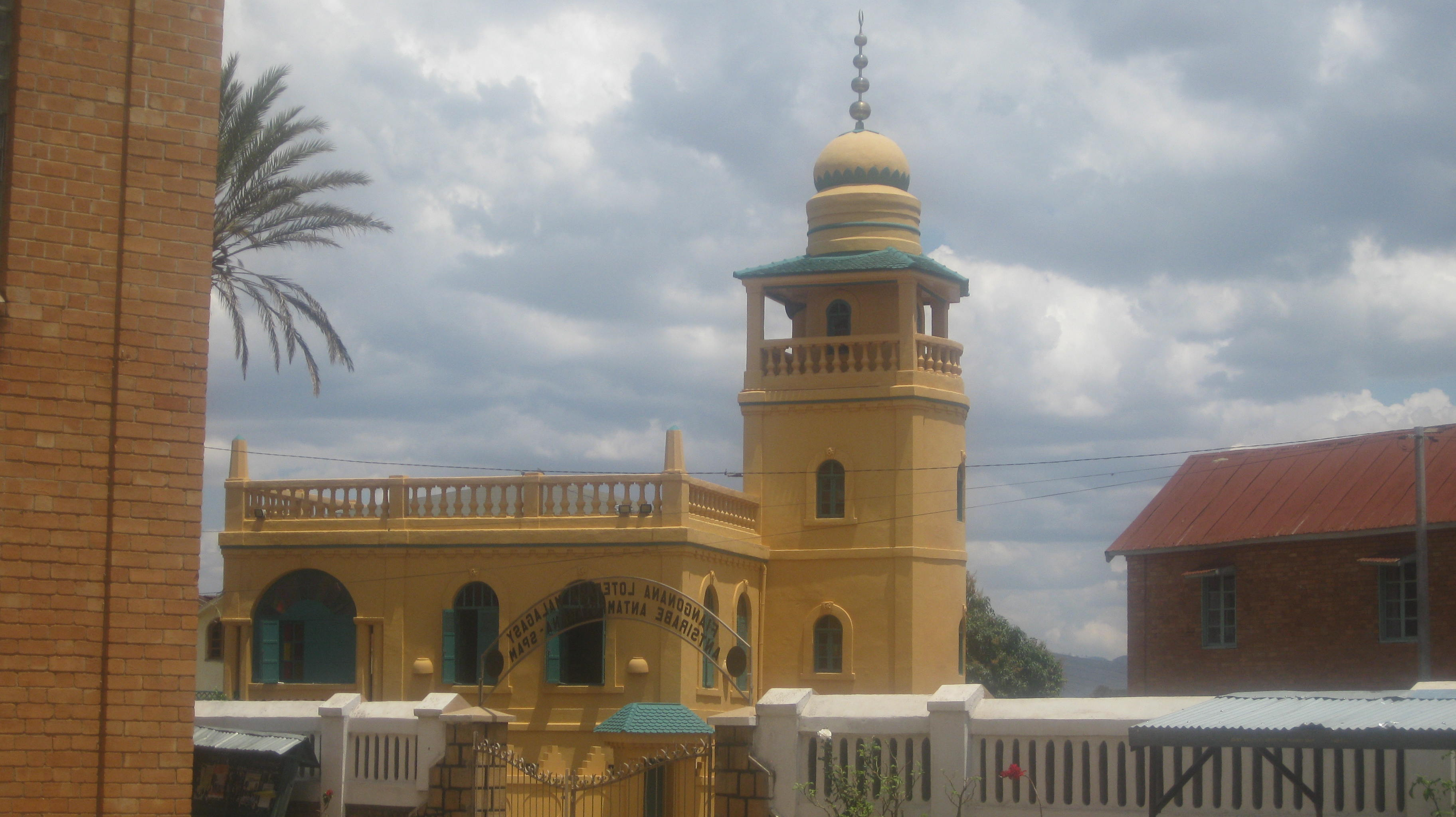
Antsirabe mosque

Upon independence from France in 1960, Madagascar began developing close ties with staunchly secular Soviet Union. This stifled the development of all religion in Madagascar including Islam. However, in the 1980s, Madagascar drifted away from the Soviet Union and back towards France. The practice of Islam has seen a resurgence in modern times.

== Issues ==
Even after the passage of the nationality law in 2017, Muslims born in the country reported that members of the community have been unable to obtain Malagasy nationality despite generations of residence.

Some Malagasy Muslims have also reported difficulty in obtaining official or governmental documents at public administration offices due to their non-Malagasy sounding names. Some Muslims have also reportedly faced ridicule and harassment for being perceived as foreigners despite possessing national identity cards.

== See also ==
- Antemoro
- Antanosy
- Antankarana
- Religion in Madagascar
