= Darafify =

Malagasy legendary figure

Darafify is a legendary figure found in the oral traditions of the Andriana in south-eastern Madagascar. The Andriana claim descent from Darafify, said to have been an Arab migrant from Mecca. Traditions detail Darafify's voyage from the northern coast of Madagascar with his wife, Ramaliavaratra, and a red cow along the eastern coast in search for a place to settle. On their journey both the cow and Darafify criticise the coastal settlements along the way as inadequate, giving various reasons, until reaching the southern tip of Madagascar. Here they exclaim "the country of cattle par excellence" and the three decide to settle there. The tradition remains popular in Madagascar as it encapsulates how people view their local environment.

Antemoro traditions recount that when they arrived at their lands in the southeast, they found Muslim settlers, the Zafiraminia, already there by around 1500. A conflict between the two broke out, which traditions represent as a battle between two giants: Darafify and Fatrapaitatana.
