= Andriamangarira =

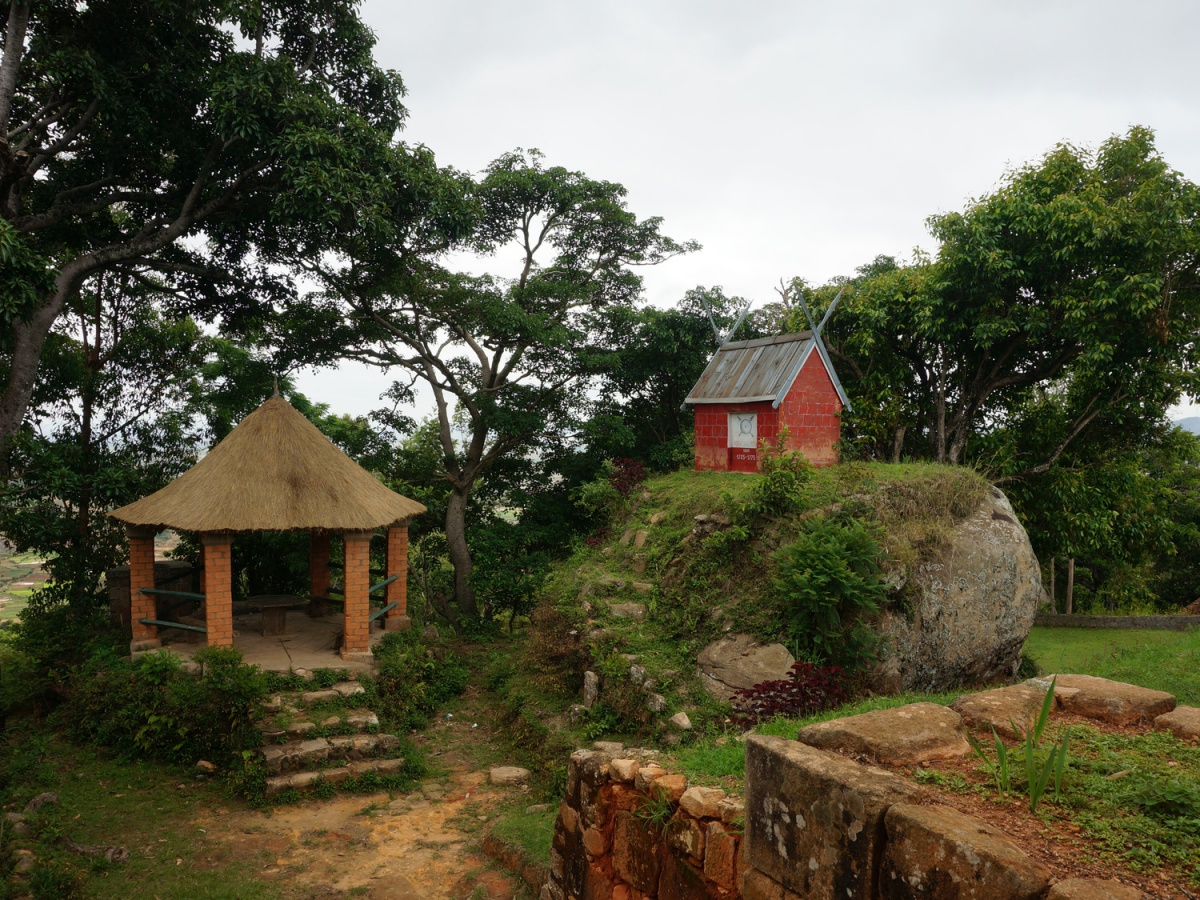
- Sacred House of Andriamangarira at the royal city of Antsahadinta

King of Antsahadinta
- Reign: 1725 – 1775 CE
- Successor: Andriambolamena
- Born: c. 1695 CE; Ambohitrontsy
- Died: Antsahadinta
- Burial: 1775 CE; Antsahadinta
- Spouse: Ratoeboahangy
- Dynasty: Andriamasinavalona
- Father: Andriandambozozoro, Lord of Ivatobe avaratra and Malaza
- Mother: Rasohanamanjaka

Andriamangarira was a king from the Merina Kingdom in Madagascar. He founded the royal city of Antsahadinta in around 1725 CE. He was the grandson of Andriamasinavalona, King of Imerina, and son of Rasohanamanjaka, the noblewoman from Ambohimahamanina, one of the King's daughters, with a certain Andriandambozozoro, Lord of Ivatobe avaratra and Malaza. The royal tomb of Andriamangarira, qualified as a « Pirogue grave », and his « Tranomasina » (Sacred House) according to traditions, are still visible in Antsahadinta.

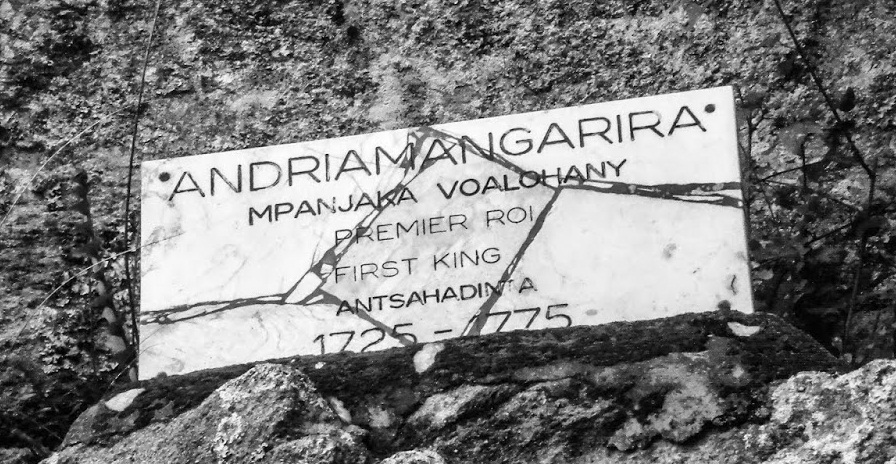
The king's memorial plaque at the Rova of Antsahadinta

After he died in 1775 CE, his second son Andriambolamena succeeded him to the throne of Antsahadinta. Their descendants constitute the clan of Zanamangarira, originally ranked in the royal order of « Andriamasinavalona », and their territories extend into Ankibonimerina from Miadanimerina avaratra, Ambatomahabodo and Finaritra; to Vakinankaratra in Isoavina, Antetezambato, Tsarafaritra, Ambatoharanana, Miadanimerina atsimo, Antamika and Ankotsaka. The whole of the territories is called Anjanamangarira.

Traditional tombs on rocks in Ambodirano Imerinatsimo

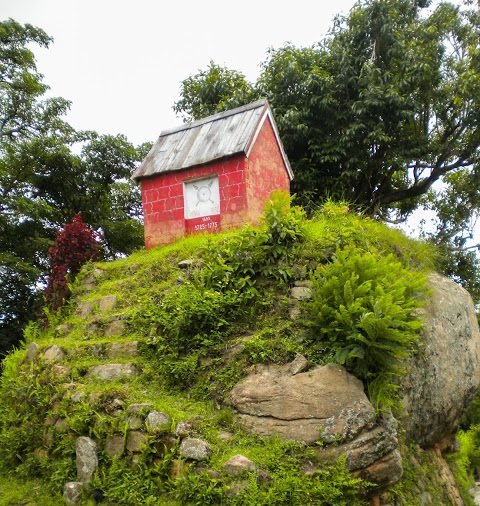
Pirogue grave, heritage at the royal city of Antsahadinta

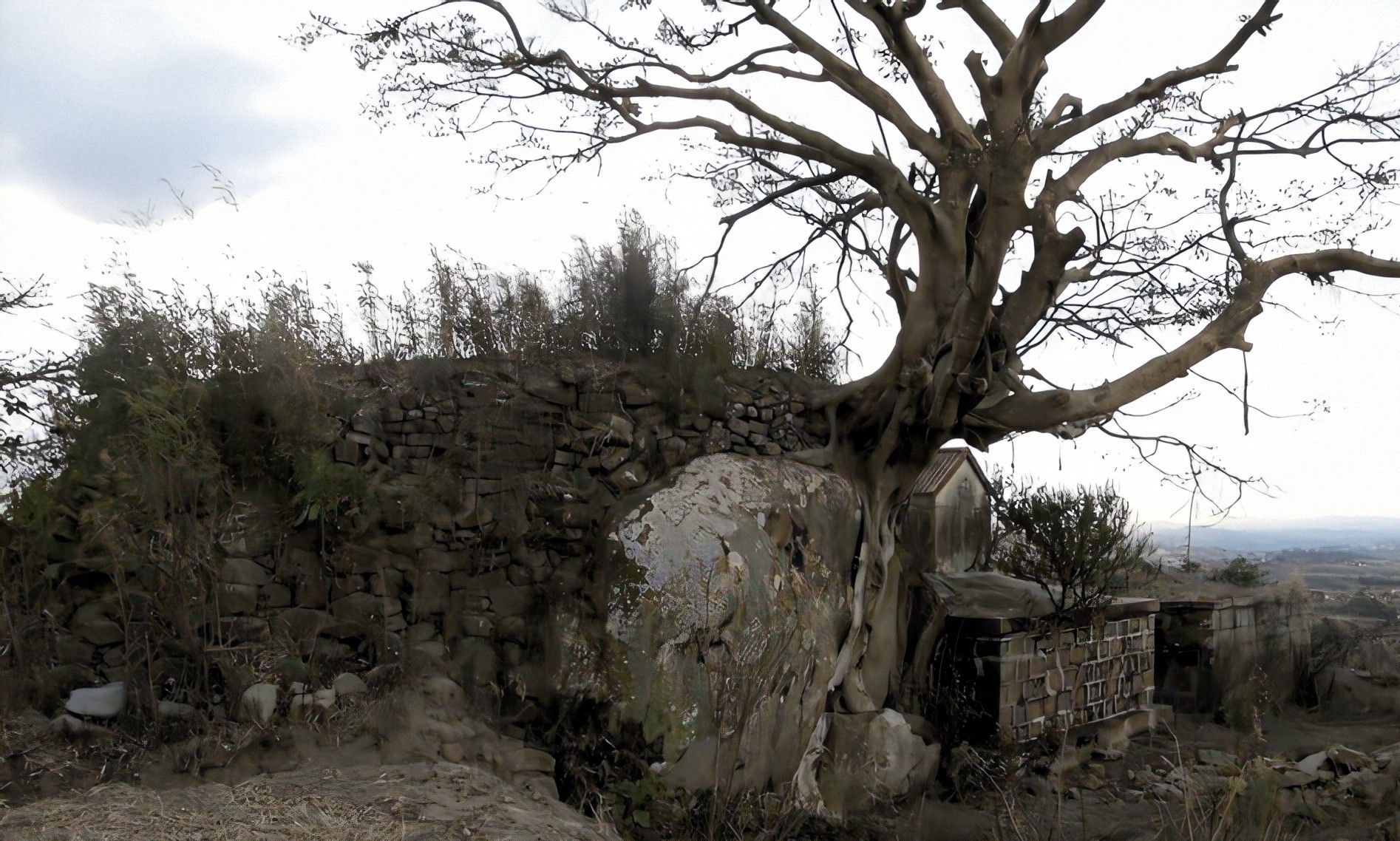
Ancient tomb (left), heritage of the order of « Andriamasinavalona » in Ivatobe avaratra

== Origin of Andriamangarira ==
King of Antsahadinta
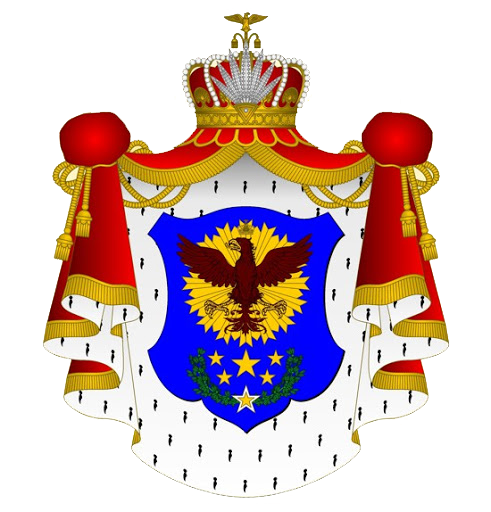

Incumbent
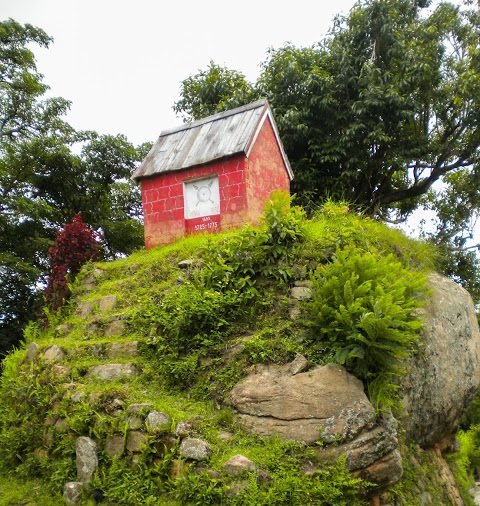
- ANDRIAMANGARIRA

This history is about events from the days of Andriamasinavalona's reign (1675 - 1710 CE) in Ankibonimerina. Being the second son of King Andriantsimitoviaminandriandehibe (1650 -1670 CE), he had many siblings. His sister named Ravololondrenitrimo, the noblewoman from Ambohimiakoja, was the mother of:

- Andriandambozozoro, the nobleman from Malaza and Ivatobe avaratra;
- Andrianjakatrimo, the nobleman from Ivatobe atsimo;
- Razafindrahety, the noblewoman from Tangaina, in Ambodirano Imerinatsimo.

According to tradition and history, Andriandambozozoro, Lord of Ivatobe, Androhibe, and Ambohitrontsy married one of the King of Imerina, Andriamasinavalona's daughters.

a) Rasohanamanjaka, the noblewoman from Ambohimahamanina, daughter of King Andriamasinavalona, gave birth to:

- Andriamangarira who founded and reigned in Antsahadinta (1725 - 1775 CE);
- Andriamalama, the nobleman from Isoanangano;
- Ranosy, the noblewoman from Androhibe;
- Rabiby, the nobleman from Antalaho / Antanetibe;
- Andriamifonozozoro (or Rafonozozoro), the nobleman from Ivatobe.

b) Rangorinimerina, the noblewoman from Ambohitrontsy, with Andriamifonozozoro, gave birth to:

- Andriamohara, who reigned in Alasora;
- Rakotomavo (or Andriambelomasina), who reigned in Ambohimanga (1730 - 1770 CE);
- Andriantoarano, the nobleman from Alasora;
- Ramisamanjaka, the nobleman from Anosiarivo;
- Andriampalimanana, the nobleman from Tsirangaina;
- Rahisatra and Rahira, noblewomen from Manandona, Randrianizara (daughter), who married Andriamborosinandriana, the nobleman from Ambohipoloalina, and gave birth to Andrianarabo, Andriantsoanandriana and Andriankotonavalona.

Andriamangarira married Ratoeboahangy, and together they had 3 children:

- Ramakilahy from Ankadinanahary;
- Andriambolamena, his successor, who reigned in Antsahadinta (1775 - 1803 CE);
- Rahanivofotsimanjaka, who married Rabibilahy, the nobleman from Ambohimahamanina.

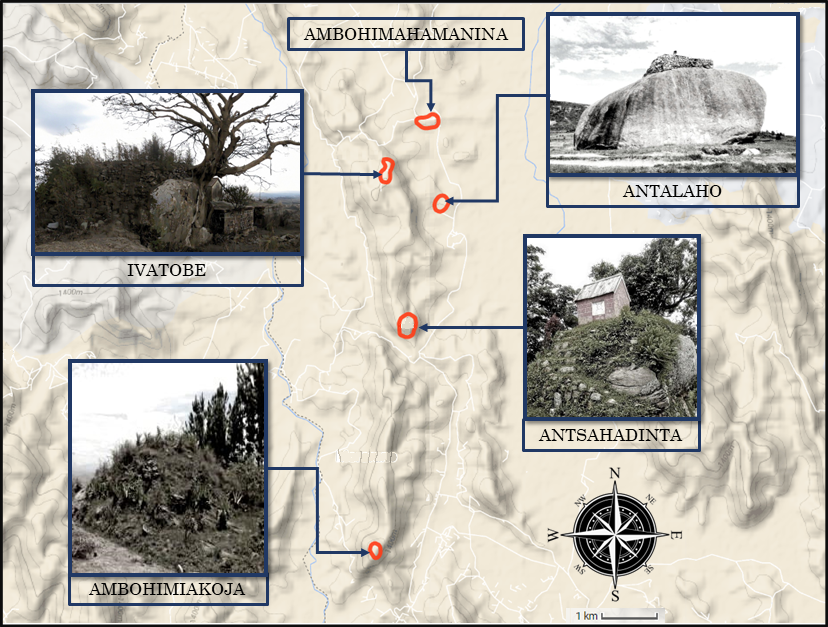
Part of the ancient district of Ambodirano Imerinatsimo and its ancient heritages

== The clan of Zanamangarira ==
Andriambolamena was the second son of Andriamangarira, King of Antsahadinta. Andrianampoinimerina, King of Avaradrano (Ambohimanga) and later, the ruler of the United Kingdom of Imerina, extended his territory and defeated Andrianamboatsimarofy, the last King of Imerinatsimo (Antananarivo), then also defeated his successor, Ramaromanompo in Anosizato, and later, among his peers and family in Antsahadinta. Andrianampoinimerina took the Kingdom of Antananarivo along with the Kingdom of Antsahadinta.

Andriambolamena and his family left Antsahadinta, after 28 years of reign, and founded a village not far from Antsahadinta, called Ambohitsoa; he died and he was buried there. He had many children but was succeeded as head of the clan by his son, Ramboabe Andrianjakapingarivo. He did not stay in Ambohitsoa but he founded a new village called Ampahatelo. Later, he left Ampahatelo and moved southward to a place next to Miantsoarivo (nearby Behenjy) and founded another village called Itsarahavana.

Ramboabe Andrianjakapingarivo had many children but those remembered in history are:

- Andriamontandraisoa: his eldest son, the nobleman from Ampahatelo, changed the village's name to Miadanimerina; and his descendants founded villages such as Ambatomahabodo. His son, Rainizakamanga was the nobleman from Finaritra;
- Andriampakatro, the nobleman from Ankatsaka, who settled in Isoavina (Ambohimandroso), and his descendants are still there.

Their descendants constitute the Zanamangarira clan and they named their territories: Anjanamangarira I (Ankibonimerina) and Anjanamangarira II (Vakinankaratra).

Heritages of the Zanamangarira clan in Ambohimandroso Gara

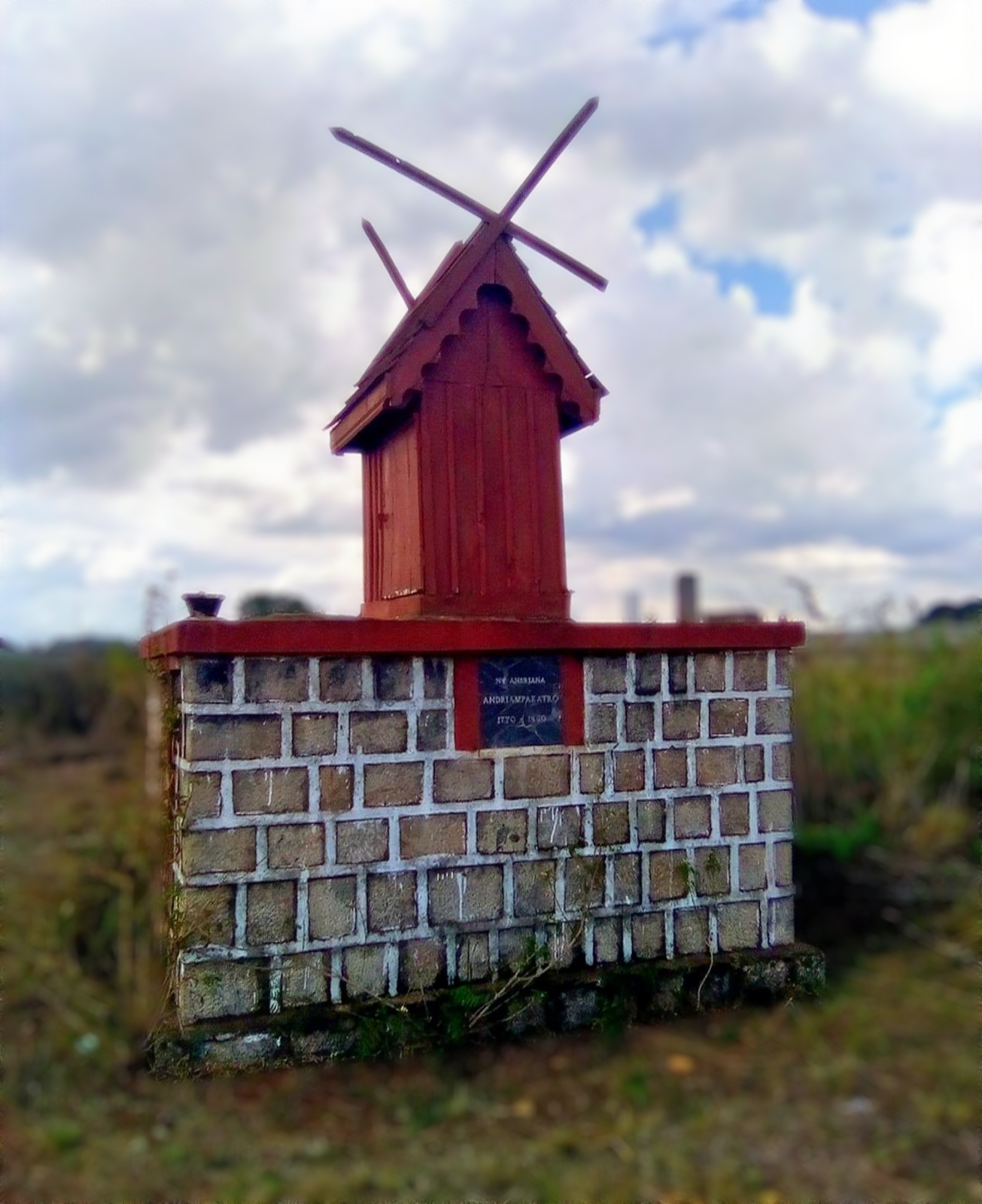
Tomb of Andriampakatro with his « Tranomanara » (Cold house)

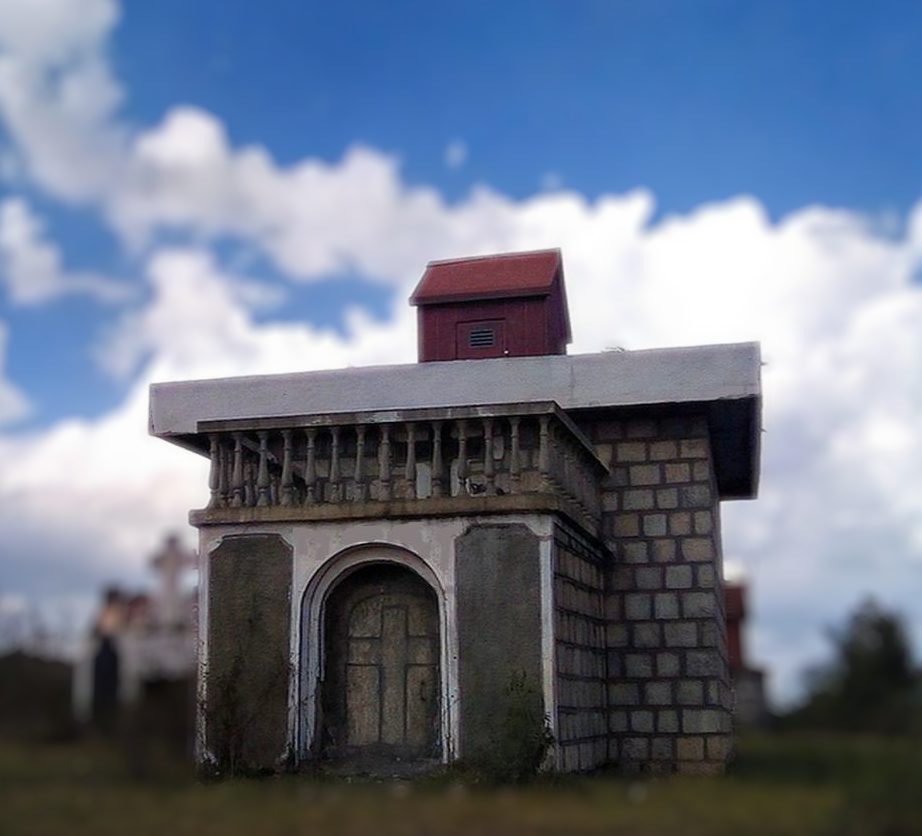
Heritage at Ambatoharanana / Ambohimandroso Gara

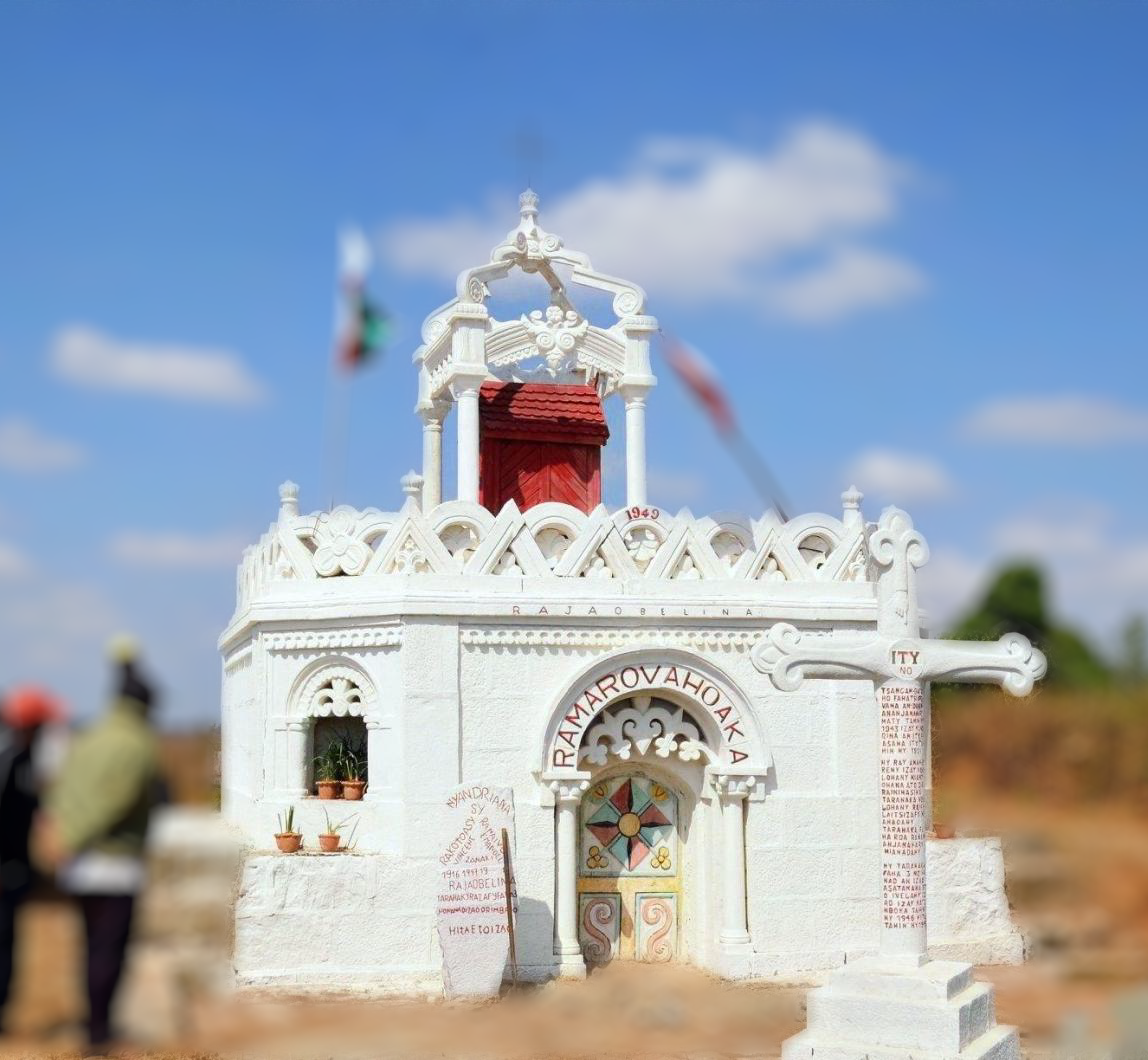
Heritage at Miadanimerina / Ambohimandroso Gara
