= Zafiraminia =

Muslim settlers of Madagascar

The Zafiraminia (meaning "descendants of Ramini") were a group of Muslim settlers on the island of Madagascar. They appeared in Madagascar at least a century before the more well-known Antemoro; the two peoples' traditions are often not distinguished.

The leaders of the Zafiraminia claimed to descent from family lines that moved from Mecca to Mangalore and then to Madagascar. However some scholars believe their origin is more likely to have been in either Sumatra or among the Bugis of Borneo. Other traditional accounts also support a Sumatran origin, as Ramini is apparently a medieval name for Sumatra. They are thought to have first come to Madagascar about the 13th century.
