= Antemoro people =

Ethnic group of Madagascar

Antemoro
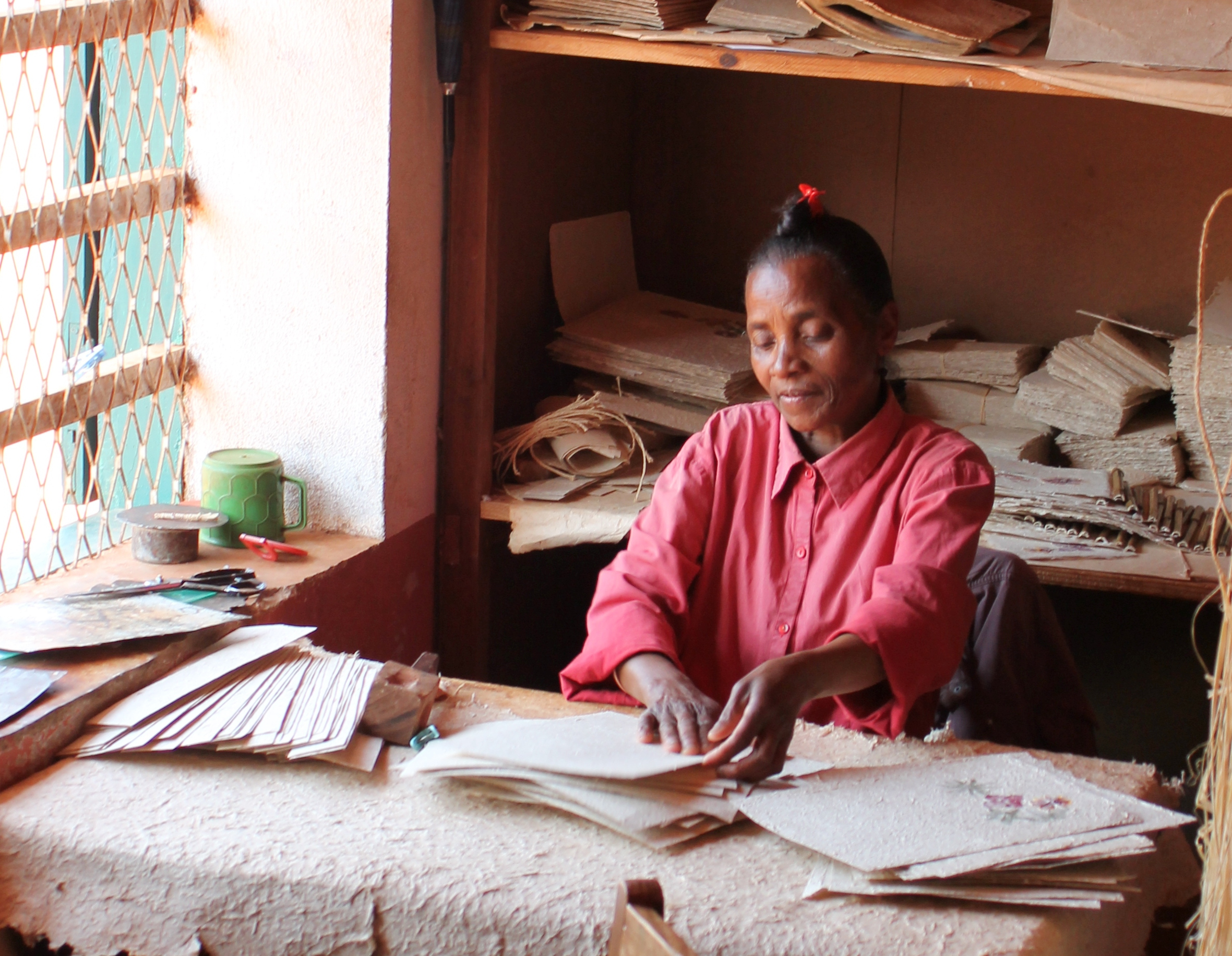
- An Antemoro woman making paper

Total population
- 1,399,000

Regions with significant populations
- Madagascar

Languages
- Antemoro

Religion
- Traditional religion – 48% Christianity – 45% (Evangelical 2.34%); Islam – 7%

Related ethnic groups
- Malagasy people Bantu peoples Somalis

The Antemoro (or Antaimoro, lit. 'people of the shore') are an ethnic group of Madagascar living on the southeastern coast, mostly between Manakara and Farafangana. The name of tribe means From Imoro. Imoro is an historical name for the homeland of the Antemoro. Numbering around 500,000, this ethnic group mostly traces its origins back to East African Bantu and Indonesian Austronesian speakers like most other Malagasy. A minority of them belonging to the Anteony (aristocrats), Antalaotra (scribes of the Sorabe alphabet) or Anakara clans claim being descendants of settlers who arrived from Arabia, Persia and the Islamic religion was soon abandoned in favor of traditional beliefs and practices associated with respect for the ancestors, although remnants of Islam remain in fady such as the prohibition against consuming pork. In the 16th century an Antemoro kingdom was established, supplanting the power of the earlier Zafiraminia, who descended from seafarers of Sumatran origin.

The Antemoro (Anteony clan) soon developed a reputation as powerful sorcerers and astrologers, in large part owing to their monopoly on knowledge of writing, termed sorabe, which uses the Arabic script to transcribe the Malagasy language. Antemoro ombiasy (astrologer sages) migrated throughout the island, where they practiced their arts for local communities, served as advisers to kings, and even founded new principalities. This Antemoro mobility and their creation of a network of powerful spiritual advisers across the island is credited with forcing an awareness among Malagasy of communities beyond their own and sparking a sense of a common Malagasy identity. The Antemoro kingdom was disbanded in the late 19th century following an uprising of the Antemoro commoners against the noble class.

Today the Antemoro remain clustered around the southeast coastal homeland, where they grow rice and coffee, produce salt, and manufacture charms. The Antemoro often leave their homeland for six to ten months out of the year or more to work as ombiasy offering charms, spells, divinations and other arcane services. Nearly every village in Madagascar has an ombiasy, and many are either Antemoro themselves or have traveled to the Antemoro homeland to receive training. The community's historic production of Antemoro paper, a flower-embedded paper traditionally used to record secret knowledge using sorabe, is another major source of income as the paper is commonly sold to tourists and exported overseas.

== Ethnic identity ==
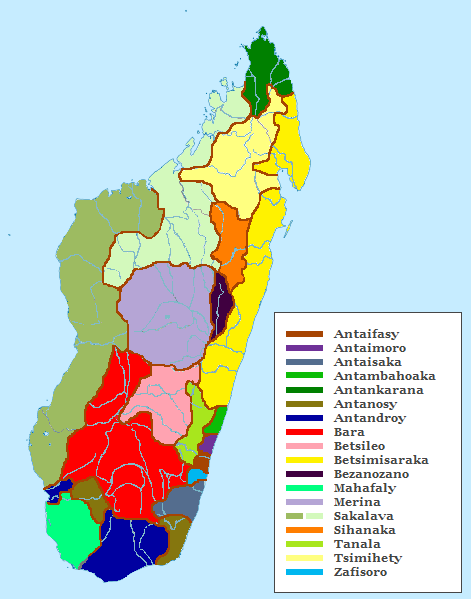
Distribution of Malagasy ethnic groups

"Antemoro", in the Malagasy language, means "people of the coast". They live on the southeastern coast, mostly between Manakara and Farafangana. The Antemoro could partially be descendants of the Somalis who settled in Madagascar in the 14th century and intermarried with the local population. In 2013 the Antemoro population was estimated at 500,000. While there are claims that link them to Arabia, other scholars argue these people are more likely linked to groups originating in the Swahili coast.

== History ==
The Antaimoro people draw their name from the province of Imoro another name for the province of Matitana in the times of Imerina Kingdom. Some of the more recent settlers on the island of Madagascar are found amongst the Antemoro. Apart from their native Ampanabaka clan which form the majority, three other clans are descended from Muslim seafarers who are believed to have arrived on the southeast coast around 1500: the Anteony, the Antalaotra and the Anakara. Boats carrying Muslim settlers had arrived on Madagascar's shores in the past, but there was a marked uptick in arrivals around this time. Upon arrival they encountered several other Malagasy ethnic groups including the Zafiraminia, who also traced their origins back to Mecca by way of East Africa, although some scholars suggest that the origins of the Zafiraminia was in Sumatra. The Zafiraminia had developed a high status among Malagasy communities for the knowledge and technology they had carried with them from overseas, and who had the prerogative of practicing ritual animal sacrifice for the ancestors (sombili), a highly powerful and important rite among Malagasy communities. Oral and written historical traditions of the Antemoro describe their desire to secure marriages between the two communities, but these efforts were rejected by the Zafiraminia. A conflict developed between the two groups for supremacy, which the oral histories of other Malagasy groups describe as a battle between two giants. The conflict evolved as additional Arab settlers arrived and joined with their fellow newcomers to become Antemoro themselves.

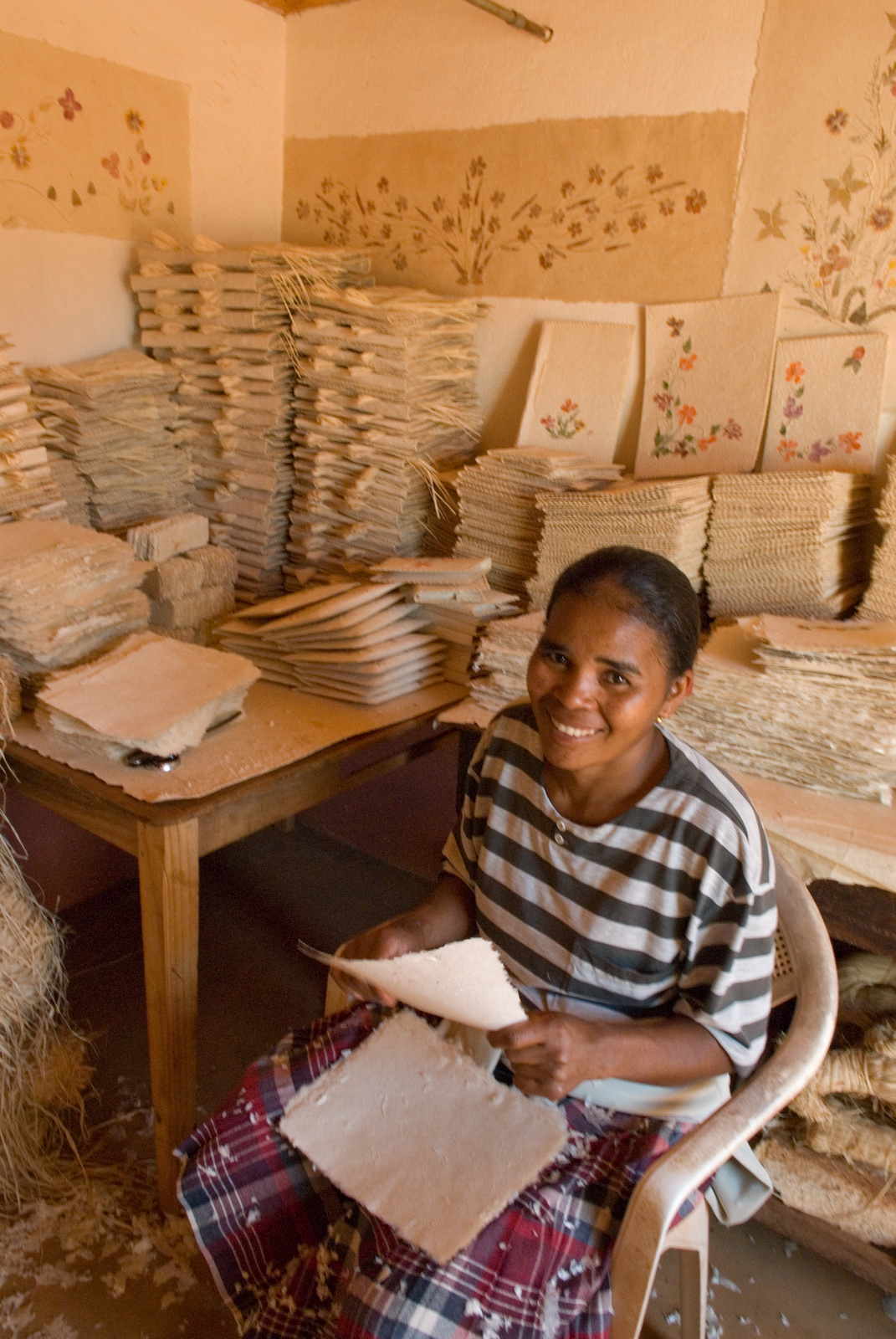
Antemoro paper is still commonly produced in Madagascar in centers such as Ambalavao (pictured).

The Antemoro, regarded as the last major group of overseas migrants to settle in Madagascar, completed an important phase in the formation of the Malagasy people. Based on genealogical traditions and early European accounts, it has been estimated that two initial contingents of Antemoro migrants reached Madagascar around 1490 and established themselves in the Matitana region by 1512. A final contingent appears to have arrived by approximately 1540.

Some traditions concerning the ancestral origins of communities in southeastern Madagascar refer to people from “Diba and Jawa” together, almost as though the two names represented a single geographical or cultural sphere. According to the tradition preserved at Vohimasina, people associated with Diba and Jawa came together and settled there. The names Diba and Wadiba have also been associated with the Maldives and the wider Maldive–Chagos island world. In this context, the tradition may preserve a distant memory of movements connecting Island Southeast Asia, the central Indian Ocean islands, and Madagascar.

Other forms of evidence, including studies of maritime technology (Manguin, 2000) and comparative linguistics (T. Hoogervorst, personal communication, April 2010), support the hypothesis that the Maldives served as an important staging point for Austronesian exploration, migration, and maritime expeditions into the western Indian Ocean. The association of Diba with Jawa in Malagasy traditions may therefore reflect the interconnected maritime routes through which Austronesian seafarers travelled westward across the Indian Ocean.

The expressions Vahoaka Gola and Gola Vahoaka are associated in local tradition with an ancient people or ancestral population. Since Malagasy vahoaka means “people,” “population,” or “community,” these expressions may be understood as referring to the “Gola people” or an ancient ancestral community remembered under the name Gola.

As an organised immigrant community, the Antemoro succeeded in imposing their political and social institutions upon the tompontany, or established inhabitants, of Matitana. Through intermarriage, they gradually adopted the Malagasy language. At the same time, they increasingly practised endogamy to preserve their distinct communal identity, religious heritage, and aristocratic status.

Unique among the peoples of Madagascar, the Antemoro developed an extensive scribal tradition preserved in numerous Arabico-Malagasy manuscripts known as Sorabe. One surviving manuscript may predate the seventeenth century. Although most extant manuscripts were produced during the nineteenth century, some are undoubtedly copies of considerably earlier texts. An old Antemoro vocabulary also contains a much higher proportion of Arabic words than is found in their language today.

Although Islamic beliefs and practices have become greatly diluted among the modern Antemoro—partly because of their long isolation from the wider Muslim world—the surviving manuscript tradition, Arabic vocabulary, genealogies, and religious customs strongly indicate that their ancestors once formed a deeply devout Muslim community.

Around 1550 the mounting conflict seems to have reached a turning point with the Zafikasimambo noble family rising to power in Matitana following the family leader's marriage to a local woman. Historical texts tie the lineage of the family's leader, Zafikazimambobe, to Anteony noble Ramarohala, who had settled there at least three generations before. Other historical sources confirm however that the genealogy described in these texts is not factual, and that the Zafikazimambo family had only newly arrived and so had no demonstrable descent from local nobles. Rather, these texts suggest that it took over three generations for the Antemoro to successfully integrate into the society through intermarriage and other means, and also reflect an awareness among the Antemoro of the importance of local caste and lineage traditions and their need to find a place within them. Upon rising to power, the Zafikasimambo clan absorbed the ritual privileges of the former Zafiraminia clan and had established themselves as the premier ombiasy (wise men) who practiced astrology and served as scribes; they regularly left the Antemoro homeland to provide their services where needed. These ombiasy also often trained the spiritual leaders of other communities, further reinforcing the preeminence of the Matitana ombiasy as masters of arcane knowledge and those outside their clan who sought to learn or dispense it. The Zafikasimambo used their right to conduct sombily (ritual sacrifice) to shape and increasingly control political and economic activities in the area. To end the conflict with the Zafiraminia, they executed as many males of the group as possible and relegated the women and children to restricted areas. In this way they established the first strong Antemoro kingdom. They are rare among Malagasy clans as newcomers who successfully established their own kingdom within a short time after landing on the island.

Under Antemoro Zafikasimambo leadership, the commoners' freedom was significantly reduced and religion became a central feature of social and political life. The conflict between the Antemoro and Zafiraminia nobles and the resulting Zafikasimambo rule also established a tradition of emigration from this part of the island. Unlike the majority of Malagasy who generally seek to return to their ancestral land, the Antemoro initially felt no such call to remain linked to a geographic area. As a result, the ombiasy of the Antemoro traveled widely, some moving from place to place and others settling permanently at royal courts and elsewhere. Their arcane knowledge of writing, medicine, technology and other areas both established their reputation as indispensable advisers to nobles and commoners alike, and instilled the island-wide feature of the community astrologer who shapes daily life. The ombiasy of Matitana were According to historian Bethwell Ogot, the network of stationary and itinerant Antemoro ombiasy were key in transforming the societies of Madagascar from an amalgam of insular clans to outward looking communities with greater awareness of others, leading to territorial expansion and larger, more complex kingdoms. In addition, oral histories suggest that sovereigns among the Merina, Tanala and Antanosy may have had ancestors who migrated away from Antemoro country.

By the early 18th century, the Antemoro had established themselves as major rice and slave exporters. Throughout the 1700s, the Antemoro were embroiled in a conflict with the Ikongo-Tanala that culminated in a bloody Tanala invasion of the eastern coastal plain. Shortly afterward, a major Antemoro leader named Andriamamohotra established an alliance and vassal relationship with the king then ruling Imerina, Andrianampoinimerina, to reestablish peace.

== Society ==
Antemoro villages are primarily clustered in the southeastern coastal area near Vohipeno and Manakara. Society was traditionally divided into two broad categories: the mpanombily (or tompomenakely), who were nobles said to be descended from Somalis from the Dir clan, and the menakely, composed of the working and slave classes, who were said to have descended from the local Malagasy who submitted to Somali rule, or alternately from slaves that the Somalis had brought with them. The mpanombily comprised many noble clans such as the Anakara, Onjatsy, Tsimaito, Antaiony, Antalaotra, Antaisambo, Antaimahazo and others. Particular clans within Antemoro society historically held distinct privileges and responsibilities. The butchering of certain animals for human consumption was assigned to specific clans.

Antemoro kings (andrianony) were selected by popular decision from among the Anteony clan, originally clustered around the mouth of the Matitanana river near the town of Manakara that shares their name. Once selected, these rulers were accorded a near-sacred status. The fady they established were scrupulously observed for centuries after the ruler's death. The Anakara were responsible for safeguarding the sacred Antemoro idols and texts, spoke a secret language for communicating arcane knowledge amongst themselves, and rarely intermarried with other Antemoro clans. This clan was believed to be in communication with powerful genies (ziny) and other spirits and was reputed to produce the most powerful sorcerers and astrologers on the island. They knew how to manufacture charms, cast spells, and practice geomancy using local gemstones. To maintain their distinction from other members of Antemoro society, the Anakara lived in villages sealed off by spiked wooden palisades where none could enter without permission. Rulers were further distinguished by fady forbidding them to wear shirts or hats.

=== Family affiliation ===
Each Antemoro clan was endogamous and marriage outside the clan was deeply taboo. Those who transgressed were mourned as if dead and were entirely cut off from the community.

=== Religious affiliation ===
The Antemoro adhere to the traditional spiritual beliefs and practices common throughout the island, although different Antemoro clans and families incorporate aspects of Islam to varying degrees. They commonly make and wear amulets upon which verses of the Qur'an are written using the sorabe script. Before converting to Islam in the seventh or eighth century, the Malagasy clans that later intermarried with Dir clan to found the Antemoro dynasty were monotheists who believed in a creator god and numerous spirits that served as intermediaries between living beings and the creator. By the time of conversion to Islam, the creator god had been all but forgotten, with much greater focus placed on the spirits, who had been raised to the level of deities. The arrival of Somali settlers prompted large scale conversion to Islam, but the core tenets were soon lost and gave way to the honoring of ancestors and their fady.

Since the late 20th century, Muslim missionaries and organizations have sparked a revival of Islamic practices among the Antemoro. Many Antemoro have reportedly reconverted to Islam or began practicing it more devoutly.

== Culture ==
East African Bantu, Arab and Islamic influences strongly mark Antemoro culture. Traditionally, Antemoro men's clothing included a turban or fez style hat and long, loose robes similar to those worn in many other parts of the Muslim world. Harefo reeds were woven to form mats (tafitsihy) that were sewn together to form jackets and tunics (with long sleeves for older men); a loincloth made of fanto (beaten barkcloth) was worn beneath the ensemble. Women wore sleeveless sheath dresses made from two or three reed mats sewn together and belted at the waist or drawn over one shoulder. Adolescent and adult women often also wore a mat bandeau or halter top. It was historically forbidden for women to wear lambas made of cotton or any other material than woven raffia mats, as it was believed this could render them more attractive to men outside their clan, with whom they were forbidden to marry.

The Antemoro were reputed across the island for being the only ethnic group to have developed a written form of the Malagasy language, sorabe, which used Arabic script; this form of writing was largely replaced elsewhere by the Latin alphabet under the Merina monarchy in the 19th century. The Antemoro were also widely reputed in the pre-colonial period for their astrologers, who would predict the future based on lunar phases. They were known all across Madagascar and acted as advisers at the court of many Malagasy kings, including the celebrated Merina king Andrianampoinimerina, whose Antemoro astrologers advised him and taught him sorabe writing. The pan-Madagascar tradition of the ombiasy is rooted in this element of Antemoro culture. The introduction of royal sampy (idols) into the Kingdom of Imerina is likewise attributed to an Antemoro ombiasy.

=== Fady ===
Taboos (fady) among the Antemoro derive from ancestral traditions as well as from aspects of Islamic and Arab culture. An Antemoro taboo against dogs as unclean, although shared by Islam, actually predates the arrival of the religion on the island. The prohibition against eating pork, however, originated with the introduction of Islam. Traditionally, members of a given Antemoro clan could only eat with others of the same clan.

=== Funeral rites ===
The death of any member of the community is mourned in the same way, regardless of social class. All community members participate in a week-long period of mourning for the deceased, during which time they are forbidden to wash or change clothing. On the eighth day, the mourning period is broken and everyone bathes and dresses in fresh attire. A female widow must continue the mourning period until the parents of the deceased declare it completed. A male widower remains shut away in his home for a period of one or two weeks, during which time the parents of the deceased send a female family member to care for him and keep him company.

== Language ==
The Antemoro speak a dialect of the Malagasy language, which is a branch of the Malayo-Polynesian language group derived from the Barito languages, spoken in southern Borneo. The language is traditionally written using the sorabe script, and those who master this form of writing are called katibo and are considered to possess unusual power. Sorabe writings traditionally ranged from instructional texts for teaching astrology, to historical records and other forms of documentation, and materials written using the sorabe script were considered to be sacred.

Among various Antemoro clans, the religious specialists (especially the Anakara) preserve and speak a secret language called Kalamo. Kalamo is an Arabic language that utilizes Malagasy morphology and syntax that the locals call kalamon' Antesitesy.

== Economy ==
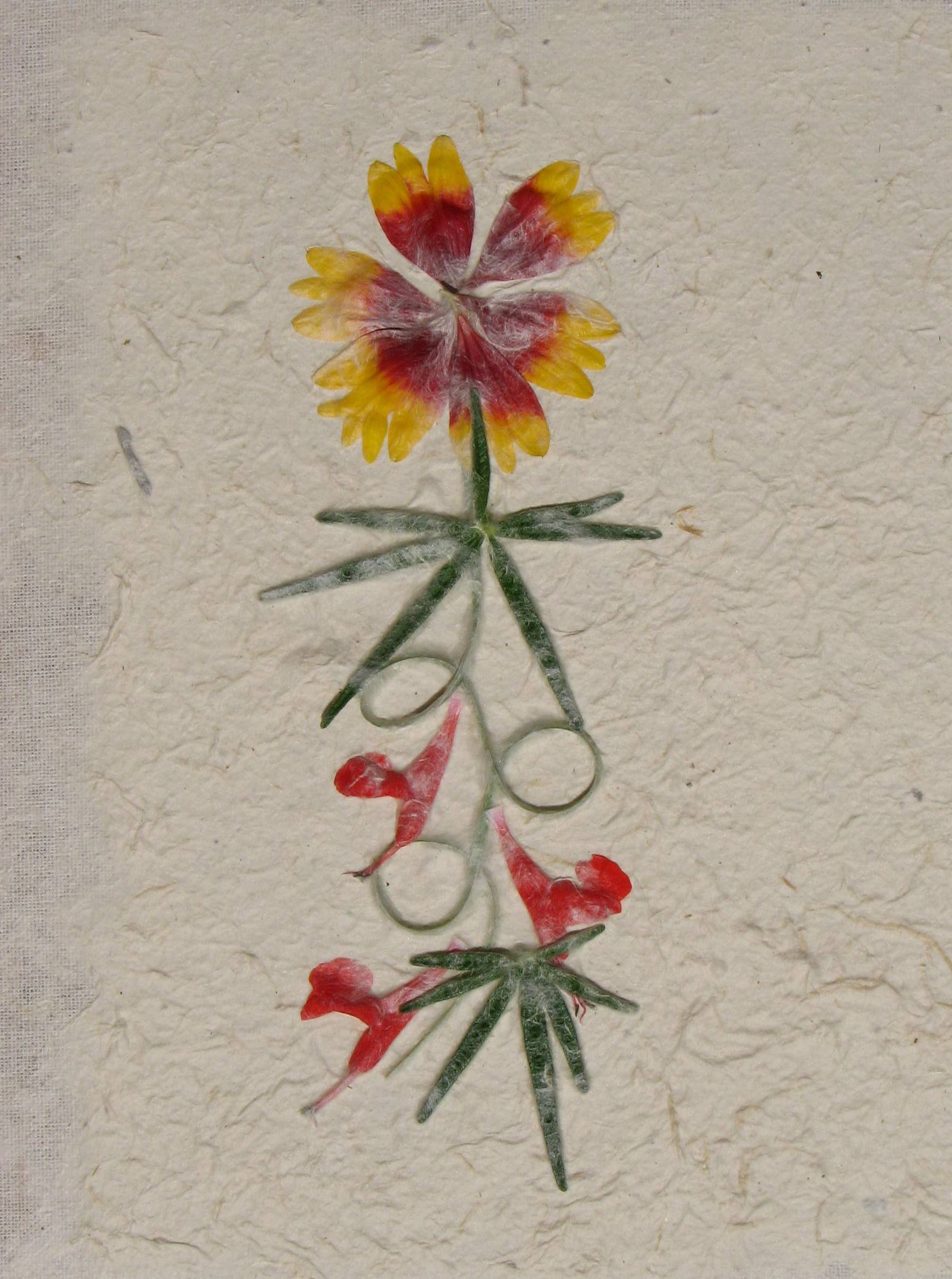
Antaimoro paper sheet

Many Antemoro work as ombiasy and earn their livelihood selling their services as astrologers, sorcerers, or crafters of powerful amulets; it is common for men to travel for six to ten months out of the year. Coffee production is widespread in the Antemoro homeland and generates income for many families. Those who own little or no land often emigrate to work as agricultural laborers in the north and west. The Antemoro Ampanira clan was historically a main producer and trader of sea salt. The Antemoro are well known for their handmade paper, which is often decorated using pressed fresh flowers and leaves. Antemoro paper is a major product marketed to tourists.

== Notable Antemoro ==
The first formal school in the Kingdom of Imerina was established and run from 1800 to 1804 by two Antemoro ombiasy, Andriamahazonoro and Ratsilikaina, who taught the future King Radama I and four or five other children to read using sorabe, trained them to manufacture ink and paper, and educated them in the art of astrology and divination. Andriamahazonoro was among the party of three who served as the first ambassadors to Britain and Mauritius; he died in 1838 from tangena poison administered in a trial by ordeal during the reign of Queen Ranavalona I.

- Lucien Botovasoa

== Bibliography ==
- Bradt, Hilary; Austin, Daniel (2007). Madagascar (9th ed.). Guilford, CT: The Globe Pequot Press Inc. pp. 113–115. ISBN 978-1-84162-197-5.
- Campbell, Gwyn (2012). David Griffiths and the Missionary "History of Madagascar". Leiden, The Netherlands: Brill. ISBN 978-90-04-20980-0.
- Condra, Jill (2013). Encyclopedia of National Dress: Traditional Clothing Around the World. Los Angeles: ABC Clio. ISBN 978-0-313-37637-5.
- Diagram Group (2013). Encyclopedia of African Peoples. San Francisco, CA: Routledge. ISBN 978-1-135-96341-5.
- Ferrand, Gabriel (1902). Les musulmans a Madagascar et aux Comores: Troisieme partie - Antankarana, sakalava, migrations arabes (in French). Paris: Ernest Leroux.
- Gennep, A.V. (1904). Tabou Et Totémisme à Madagascar (in French). Paris: Ernest Leroux. ISBN 978-5-87839-721-6.
- Hamès, Constant (2007). Coran et talismans: textes et pratiques magiques en milieu musulman. Paris: Karthala. ISBN 978-2-84586-873-1.
- Ogot, Bethwell A. (1992). Africa from the Sixteenth to the Eighteenth Century. Paris: UNESCO. ISBN 978-92-3-101711-7.
- Thompson, Virginia; Adloff, Richard (1965). The Malagasy Republic: Madagascar Today. San Francisco, CA: Stanford University Press. ISBN 978-0-8047-0279-9.
