= Befotaka (disambiguation) =

Befotaka may refer to several municipalities in Madagascar:

- Befotaka (also called Befotaka Atsimo), a municipality in Atsimo-Atsinanana
- Befotaka, Analalava (also called Befotaka Avaratra), a municipality in Sofia Region
- Befotaka, Atsinanana, a rural municipality in Atsinanana
- Befotaka, Mahabo, a municipality in Menabe
- Befotaka Sud District (also called Befotaka Atsimo district), in Atsimo-Atsinanana
- Befotaka, Nosy Be, a municipality on Nosy Be island (Diana Region)
- Befotaka, Ifanadiana, a rural village in Vatovavy, (Ifanadiana (district)) that belongs to the municipality of Fasintsara
