= Salehy =

- Location in Madagascar
- Coordinates: 19°59′26.88″S 48°47′4.91″E
- Country: Madagascar
- Region: Atsinanana
- District: Mahanoro District
- Time zone: UTC3 (EAT)
- Postal code: 510

Salehy is a small municipality situated at the mouth of the Mangoro River on its north side at a distance of 10 km from Mahanoro, on the East coast of Madagascar. The village of Ambodiharina lies across the Mangoro River from Salehy.

== Industry ==
People living in Salehy are principally involved in fishing, agriculture, handicraft, "betsa" manufacturing (an alcoholic traditional beverage) and a small part of tourism. Many people in Salehy, similar to those in other villages in Madagascar, live in extreme poverty.

== Geography ==
The village is surrounded by water, by the Canal des Pangalanes to the west, Mangoro River to the south, and Indian Ocean to the east, preceded by a small natural swimming pool called “Dobo masina”, meaning “Salted pool”. The water is salty because of the ocean, as it can reach that body of water during the night even a kilometer inland.

To the east is the confluence of the Mangoro River, the Canal, and the Indian Ocean. This confluence changes its place but Salehy remains. To the north, there is also a small lake named “Salehy be” (Big Salehy).

== History ==
Historically, though an oral tradition, the name Salehy came from French people who passed by there. They drank water from “Dobo masina”, and finding it salted, exclaimed “Ohh! C’est salé” (it's salted). The name of the place was after that Salehy.

Salehy has historically been impacted by successive passing cyclones. People there don't build strong house because they say that it will be destroyed again by future cyclones. The truth, however, is that they don't have enough resources to build strong houses.

== Nearby towns ==
All distances 'as the bird flies' and approximate:

- Tsangambato (1.9 km north)
- Ambodiharina (2.5 km south west)
- Ifasina (3.9 km north west)
- Ankazomirafy (5.8 km north)
- Betsizaraina (6.6 km north west)
