= Idiodes albistriga =

Scientific classification
- Kingdom: Animalia
- Phylum: Arthropoda
- Class: Insecta
- Order: Lepidoptera
- Family: Geometridae
- Genus: Idiodes
- Species: I. albistriga

Binomial name
- Idiodes albistriga (Warren, 1899)

Synonyms
- Eupagia albistriga Warren, 1899

Species of moth

Idiodes albistriga is a moth of the family Geometridae. It is found in Madagascar.

This species has a wingspan of 35 millimetres (1.4 in). The forewings of this species are dull coppery red, thickly covered with dark flecks, the veins towards hindmargin are clearer red; costa with some bright pale dots. The hindwings are paler, more pinkish, except towards hindmargin, with a cloudy cellspot, a faintly curved postmedian and a more strongly submarginal line. The underside is duller red, without the coppery tinge.

The head and thorax are coppery red, the abdomen reddish grey.

The holotype was collected North-East of Fianarantsoa in the Forrest of Ivohimanitra (North of Ambohimanga Sud).
