= Andranambomaro =

- Location in Madagascar
- Coordinates: 19°46′S 47°57′E
- Country: Madagascar
- Region: Atsinanana
- District: Mahanoro District
- Elevation: 702 m (2,303 ft)

Population (2018)Census
  - Total: 14,510
- Time zone: UTC3 (EAT)
- Postal code: 510

Andranambomaro is a rural municipality located in the Atsinanana region of eastern Madagascar. It is situated at the Onive River.

This municipality was founded only in 2015.
