= 2017–18 South-West Indian Ocean cyclone season =

Cyclone season in the Southwest Indian Ocean

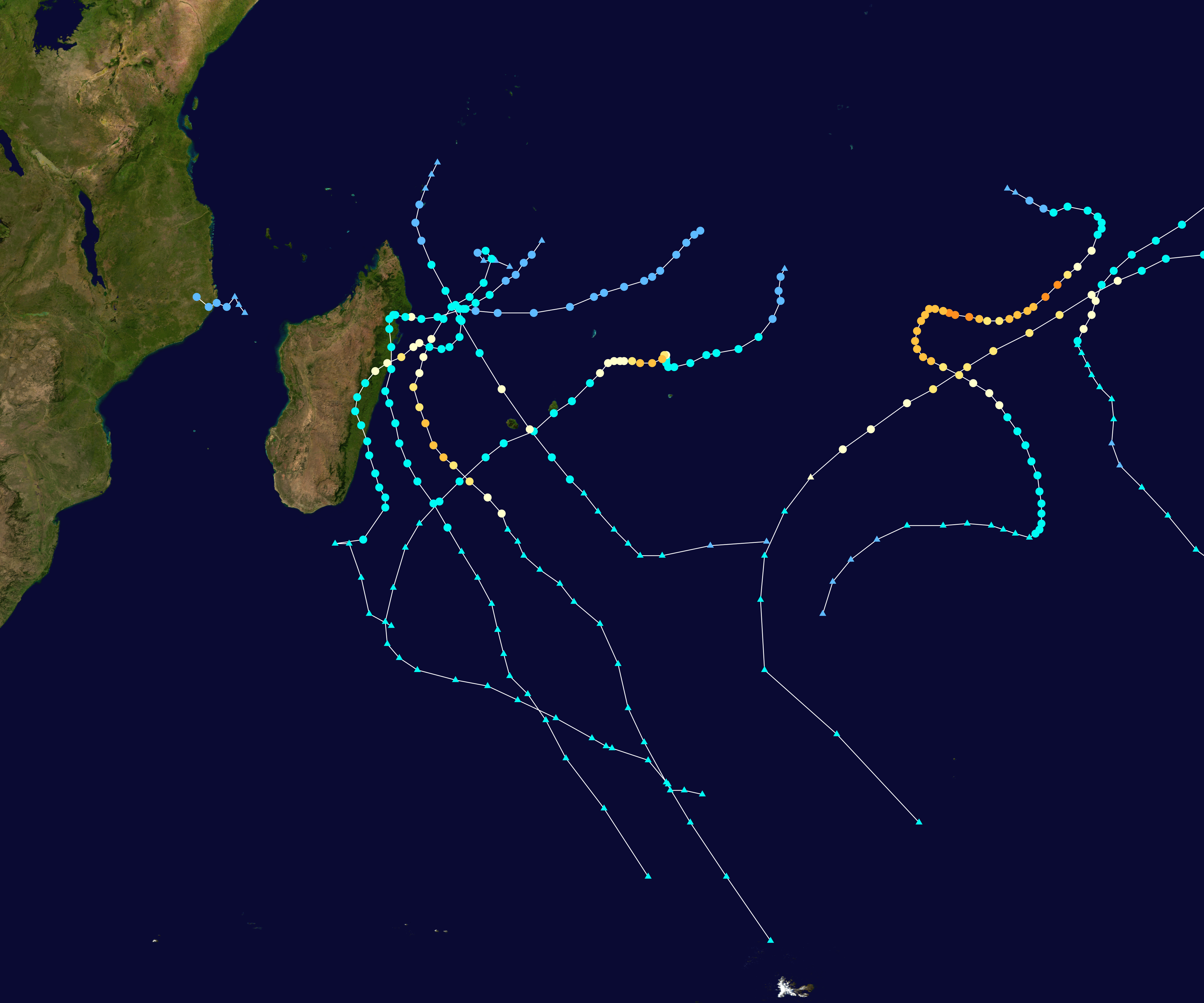
- Season summary map

Seasonal boundaries
- First system formed: 1 January 2018
- Last system dissipated: 1 May 2018

Strongest storm
- Name: Cebile
  - Maximum winds: 185 km/h (115 mph) (10-minute sustained)
  - Lowest pressure: 940 hPa (mbar)

Seasonal statistics
- Total disturbances: 9, 1 unofficial
- Total depressions: 9
- Total storms: 8
- Tropical cyclones: 6
- Intense tropical cyclones: 3
- Very intense tropical cyclones: 0
- Total fatalities: 108 total
- Total damage: $326.7 million (2018 USD)

Related articles
- 2017–18 Australian region cyclone season; 2017–18 South Pacific cyclone season

The 2017–18 South-West Indian Ocean cyclone season was a below-average season that produced only 8 tropical storms, of which 6 became tropical cyclones. It was an event in the annual cycle of a tropical cyclone and subtropical cyclone formation. It officially began on 15 November 2017, and officially ended on 15 May 2018, in Mauritius and the Seychelles. For the rest of the basin, the season ended on 30 April 2018. These dates conventionally delimit the period of each year when most tropical and subtropical cyclones form in the basin, which is west of 90°E and south of the Equator. Tropical and subtropical cyclones in this basin are monitored by the Regional Specialised Meteorological Centre in La Réunion.

== Seasonal Summary ==
Despite the season officially beginning on 15 November 2017, the basin featured no tropical systems in November and December, owing to below-average sea surface temperatures and a period of enhanced trade winds causing conditions across the basin to be unfavorable for tropical cyclogenesis. This made the 2017–18 season the third in a row to not feature a tropical system before 1 January. The first system, Tropical Cyclone Ava, became a tropical disturbance only on 1 January 2018, placing 2017–18 in the five latest-starting seasons since the satellite era began in 1967. January, however, was very active with four named systems developing (including Irving, which entered the basin from the Australian region); Berguitta and Cebile in particular would become intense tropical cyclones on Météo-France La Réunion's scale. This tied with 1968 for the most active January, and ranked just behind February 1971 for the most named storms forming in a month.

Following the dissipation of Cebile on 7 February, no cyclone activity occurred in the basin for three weeks. March featured two systems: Dumazile in the first week of the month, and Eliakim in the third. Inactivity settled in again after Eliakim dissipated on 20 March and lasted for a month. The last week of April saw two systems, Fakir and Flamboyan (which entered the basin from the Australian region). The season ended on 1 May—about two weeks later than normal—with the dissipation of Flamboyan. Overall, the season featured near-normal activity with eight named storms (compared to the average of nine). However, a larger-than-normal fraction of these named storms reached tropical cyclone status. The season also featured greater than usual impact on land areas, as most of the systems formed in the western part of the basin and were thus in closer proximity to land. The Mascarene Islands were especially hard-hit, particularly Réunion which suffered the effects of five cyclones.

=== Effects on Réunion ===
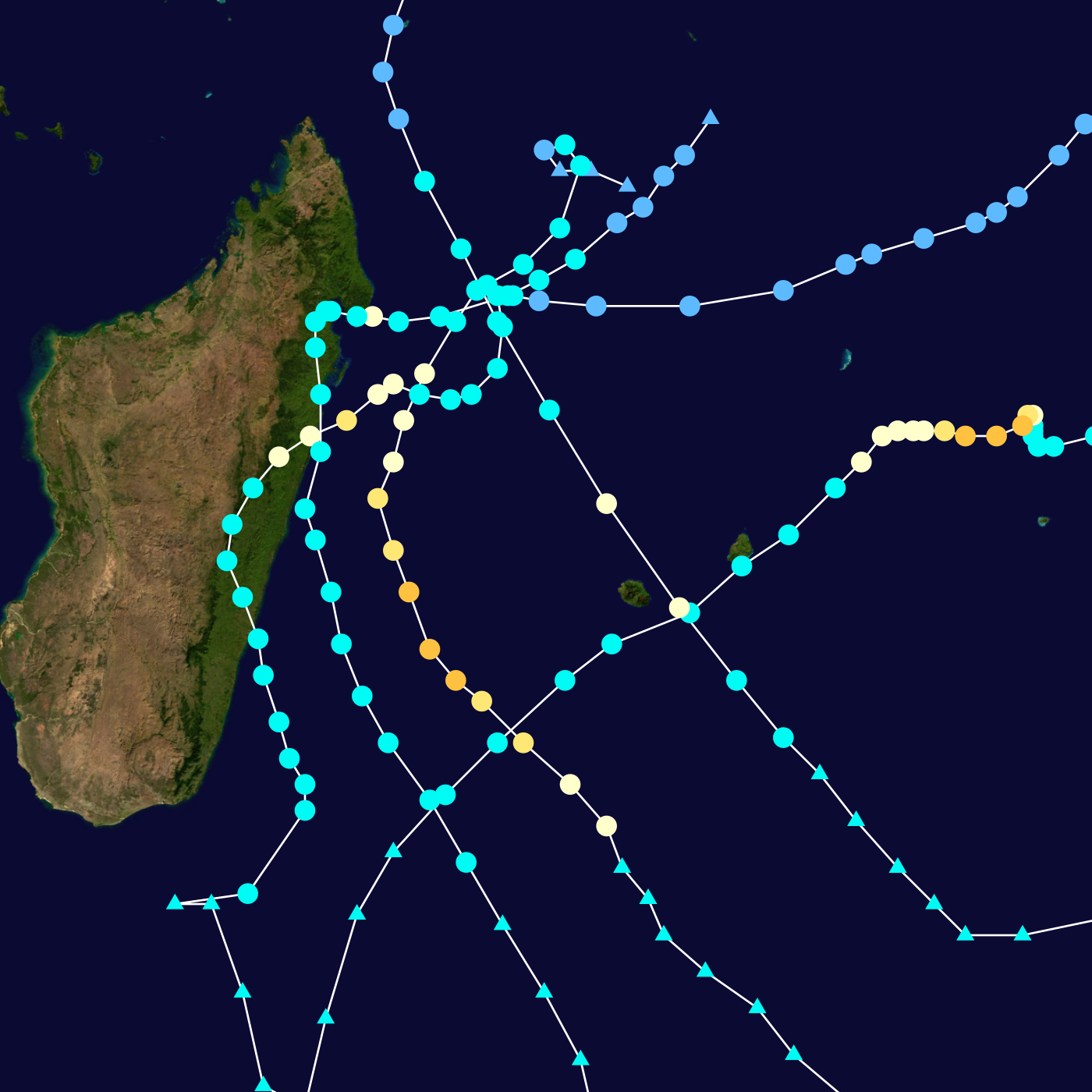
Map plotting the track and the intensity of Tropical Storm Eliakim and cyclones Ava, Berguitta, Dumazile, and Fakir near Réunion and Madagascar, according to the Saffir–Simpson scale

The season had a large-scale impact across Réunion, with five cyclones: Ava, Berguitta, Dumazile, Eliakim, and Fakir, affecting the island. Accumulating rainfall from the cyclones generated ravines which prevented employees from getting to work and caused significant damage to small-scale fishing operations, agriculture, roads, houses, and public infrastructure. Preliminary assessments of damage totaled at least €15 million (US$17.6 million), however, the final total was expected to be significantly greater. In May 2018, electrical and water companies were conducting repairs on a daily basis. Repairs were also taking place to cliffs. Berguitta and Fakir damaged the Wolmar and Tamarin beaches by displacing sand.

Fakir furthered the losses of Berguitta in the towns of Tampon, Saint-Louis, Petite-Ile, and Saint-Joseph. The rising Saint-Etienne river completely destroyed the Ouaki bridge and over 100 m (330 ft) of roadway near Saint-Louis. The torrential rainfall from Fakir stalled reconstruction efforts for the third time that year. A trail linking Bois Court and Grand Bassin was scheduled to reopen in April 2018 after having been closed since 12 February 2018. Work to stabilize cliffs, following heavy rainfall from Berguitta and Dumazile, took place in March. The Dos d'Ane-Deux Bras trail, which was damaged by Ava, Berguitta, Dumazile, and Fakir, reopened on 17 July 2018. Several landslides occurred on the RN5 highway, the only major road to Cilaos, after Ava, Berguitta, and Dumazile, resulting in the road being closed for over four months. Work to repair two bridges was halted as a result of a ban on large machinery in the river and threats of criminal prosecution against the workers. Protests erupted on 7 March 2018 as a result of the halted work.

New crops planted in the aftermath of Cyclone Berguitta were largely destroyed by Cyclone Dumazile just a few weeks later. At that point, the island had experienced nearly three months of continuous rainfall, with only ten dry days. Several items, including salads, zucchini, paracress, carrots, and tomatoes, were expected to have shortages or be entirely unavailable. Three systems, mainly Fakir, caused significant damage to sugar canes. Estimates for the sugar harvest fell to 1,600,000 metric tons (1,800,000 short tons), the lowest since Cyclone Gamede affected Réunion in 2007. These losses represent at least 20 percent of the sugar cane production. The actual sugar harvest was less than forecast, reaching 1,600,000 metric tons (1,800,000 short tons), which was the worst harvest in over fifty years. Berguitta, Fakir, and other significant rainfall events caused €39.3 million (US$46.5 million) in agricultural losses. The Réunion prefecture government allocated €41.5 million (US$49.1 million in aid for farms that experiences losses due to the aforementioned weather events and the Yellow Vest protests that took place during November 2018. An additional €16 million (US$18.9 million) in aid was approved for investment projects, farmer income increases, the creation of employment opportunities, and the reduction of prices.

In March 2019, the General Confederation of Planters and Breeders of Réunion Island requested that the agricultural minister to increase the dispersal rate for the aid package to help with recovery efforts. Aid of €2,000 (US$2,350) per 1 hectare (2.5 acres) was also promised for some farms, however, the dispersal of the aid was slow. Following Fakir, vegetable prices were expected to increase once again. An additional €2.3 million (US$2.7 million) in aid was authorized by 2 May 2018 by the Réunion Departmental Council. At least 95 farmers had received at least €220,000 (US$258,800) in aid for damage sustained during the season by 11 July 2018. Agricultural experts anticipated that it would take months or years for farmers to recuperate the losses sustained during the cyclone season.

After Ava, Berguitta, Dumazile, and Fakir, the mayor of Sainte-Suzanne called for an emergency meeting of the Association of Mayors of Reunion Island in order to discuss potential solutions to the problems these storms caused. MP David Lorion requested that the Réunion Prefecture government and the Minister of Overseas establish a relief fund to help repair damage sustained by floods and mudslides during cyclones Berguitta and Fakir.

The season had a considerable impact on plans, weather alerts, construction standards, and infrastructure. The Communist Party of Réunion discussed implementing multiple improvements following the season, including redrawing risk areas and construction guidelines and adapting school schedules to the island's climate. Near Saint-Pierre, at least €6.1 million (US$7.3 million) in funds were provided to improve the Chemin Stéphane highway, a roadway used by over 8,500 people per day, by constructing better drainage networks, new sidewalks, and a new driving surface. The Réunion Prefecture government assembled a meeting of the mayors on 4 May 2018 to discuss implementing a new warning system for the next cyclone season. A new purple alert was created for cyclones affecting the island with winds in excess of 200 km/h (125 mph). The warning system was also modified to allow for warning declarations as a result of severe rainfall. Repair work at the Bras de Cilaos following Berguitta was halted following torrential rainfall during Cyclone Dumazile. Protests erupted in Cilaos because the postponement of work left 400 people isolated on the other side of the city and 100 more at Îlet Furçy.

== Systems ==
=== Tropical Cyclone Ava ===
- Tropical cyclone (MFR)
- Category 2 tropical cyclone (SSHWS)
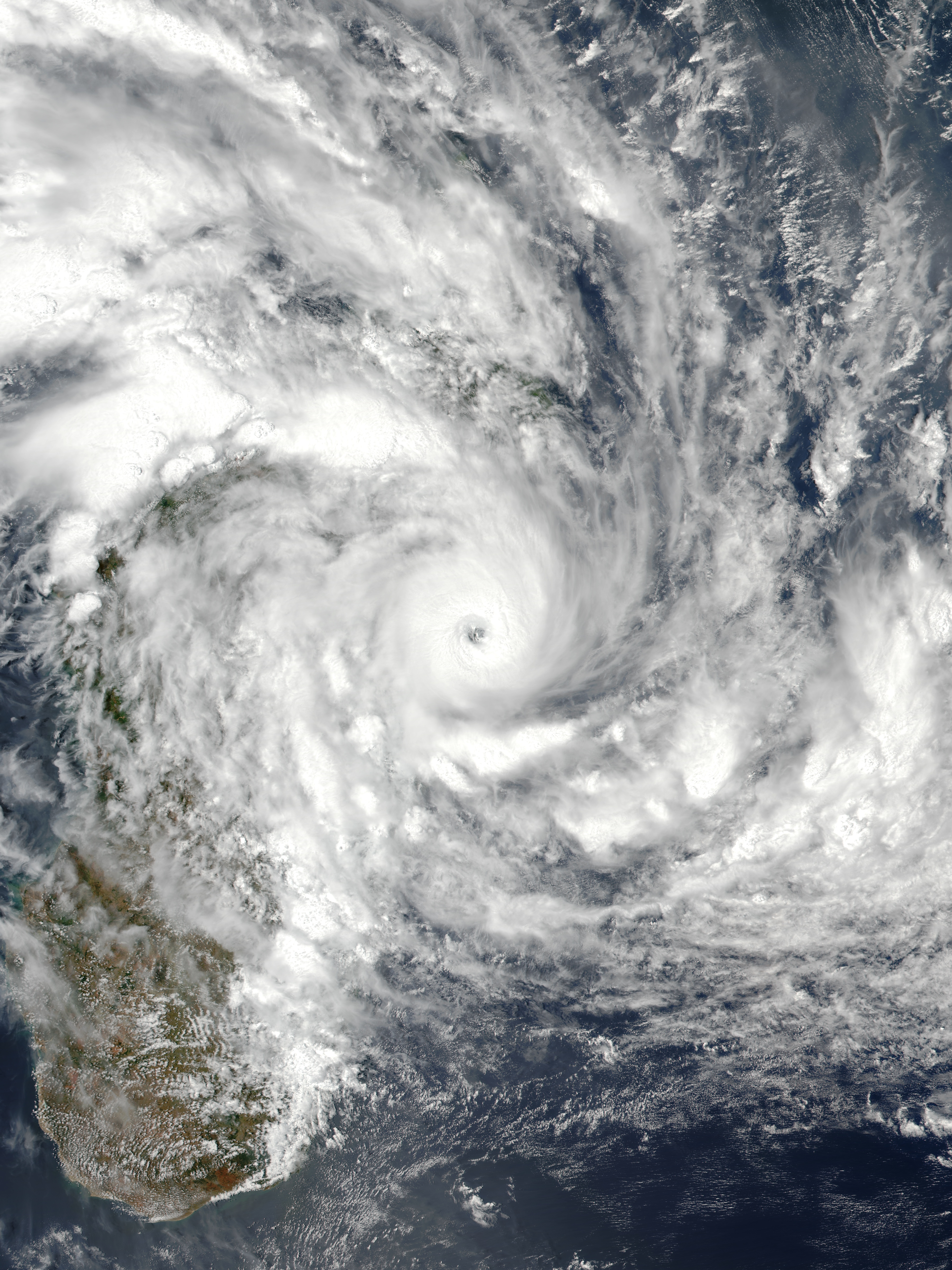
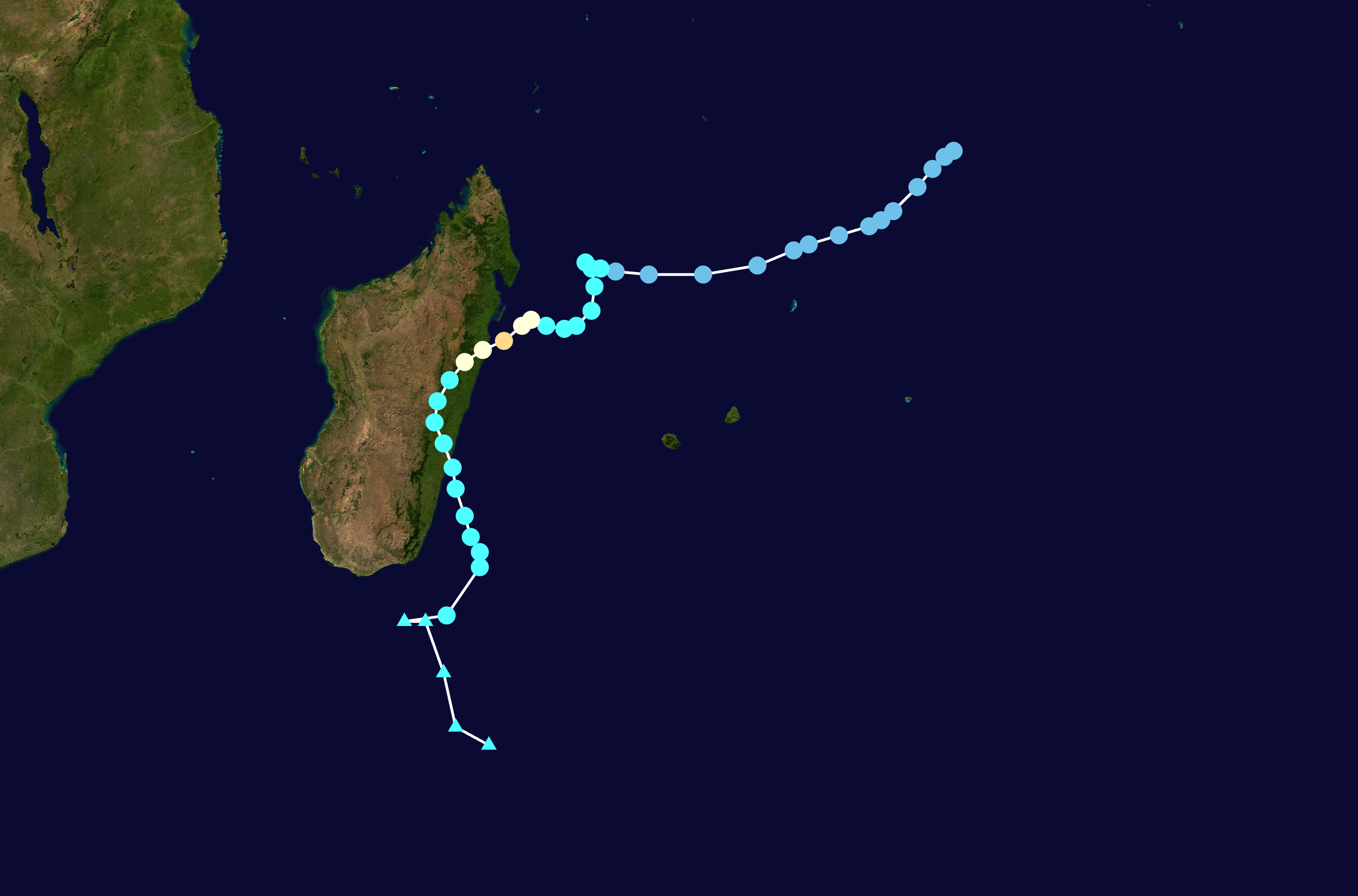
- Duration: 1 January – 8 January
- Peak intensity: 150 km/h (90 mph) (10-min); 965 hPa (mbar)

An area of low pressure formed on 27 December 2017 and was classified as a tropical disturbance by Météo-France La Réunion (MFR) on 30 December. It became Moderate Tropical Storm Ava on 2 January 2018 and intensified to reach peak intensity with 10-minute sustained winds of 150 km/h (90 mph), 1-minute sustained winds of 175 km/h (110 mph), and a central pressure of 965 hPa (28.50 inHg) on 5 January. Ava made landfall over Madagascar shortly after and reemerged over water as a weak tropical storm on 7 January. It became post-tropical on 8 January and dissipated the next day.

Ava severely impacted Madagascar, causing at least 73 fatalities. Ava combined with the seasonal monsoon to inflict US$195 million in losses across the country. At least 51,000 people were left homeless in Ava's wake. Over a dozen healthcare facilities were destroyed and nearly 150 schools were impacted. Several dozen classrooms were used as shelters for over 20 thousand people who were displaced by the storm, and over thirty thousand students were unable to go to school. Flooding and landslides forced thousands of people to evacuate across the capital city of Antananarivo, Brickaville, Toamasina, Mananjary, and Ifanadiana. The storm caused significant damage to infrastructure across the country, with floods washing away bridges and damaging roadways. Heavy rainfall also occurred in Mauritius, flooding roads and houses. The rainfall either damaged or destroyed thirty-to-fifty percent of crops across local plantations.

=== Tropical Cyclone Irving ===
- Tropical cyclone (MFR)
- Category 2 tropical cyclone (SSHWS)
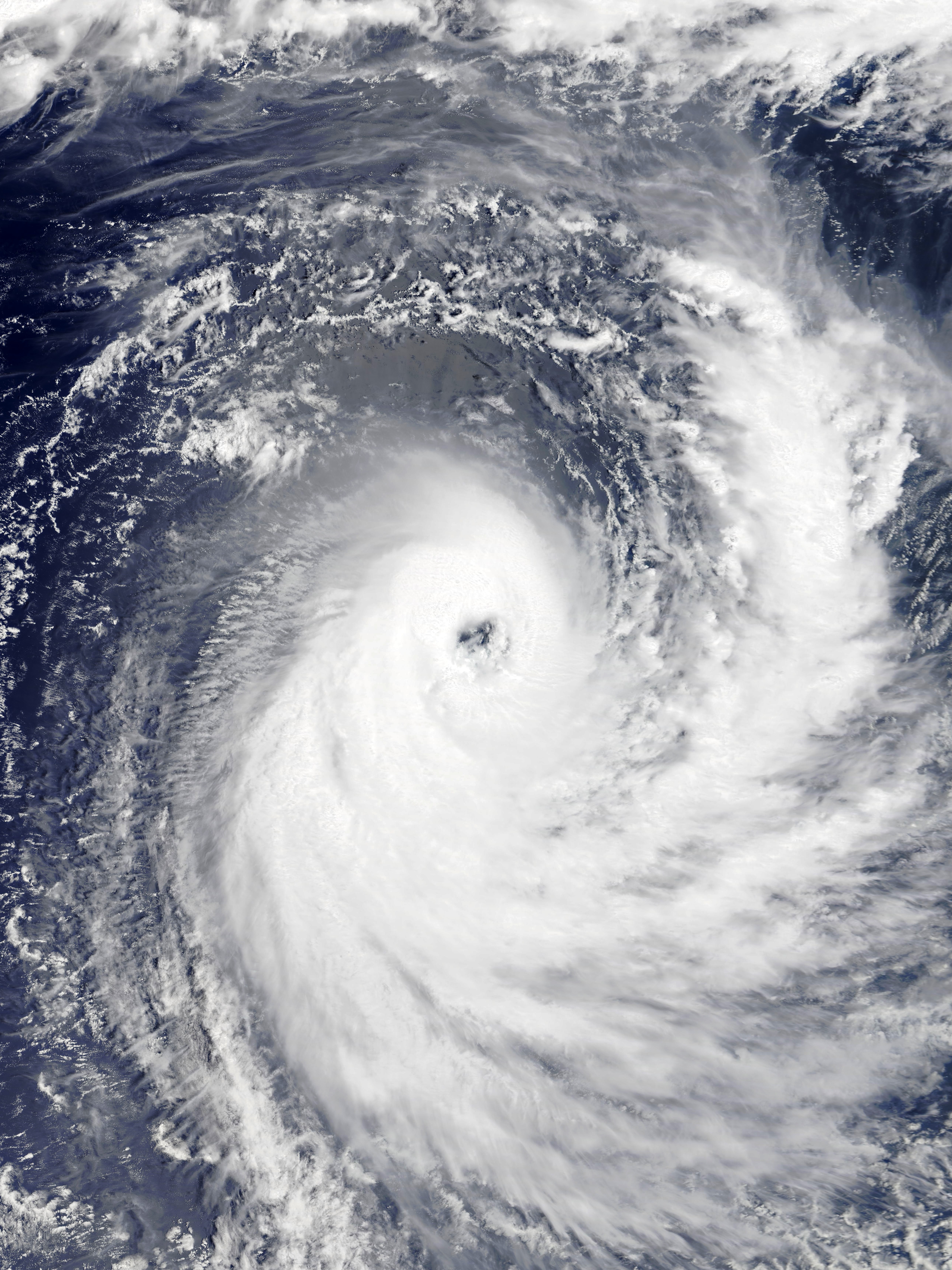
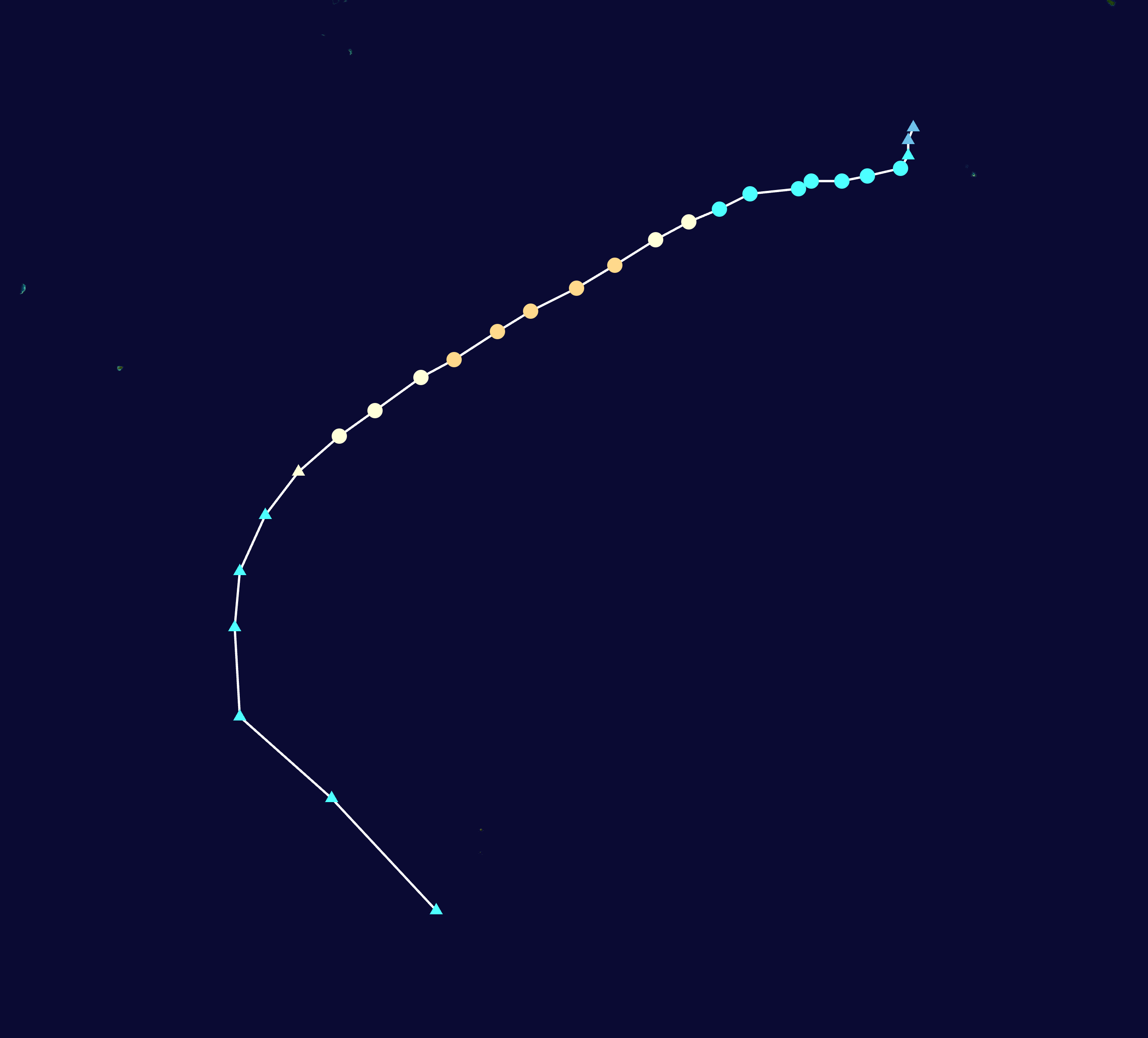
- Duration: 6 January (Entered basin) – 9 January
- Peak intensity: 150 km/h (90 mph) (10-min); 965 hPa (mbar)

Tropical Cyclone Irving was named by the Bureau of Meteorology of Australia on 6 January as it crossed over into the South-West Indian Ocean basin a few hours later. It strengthened to an equivalent of a Category 2 cyclone, before weakening as it turned southwestwards. It became post-tropical on 9 January as it dissipated to the west of Madagascar. It stayed well from land.

=== Intense Tropical Cyclone Berguitta ===
- Intense tropical cyclone (MFR)
- Category 3 tropical cyclone (SSHWS)
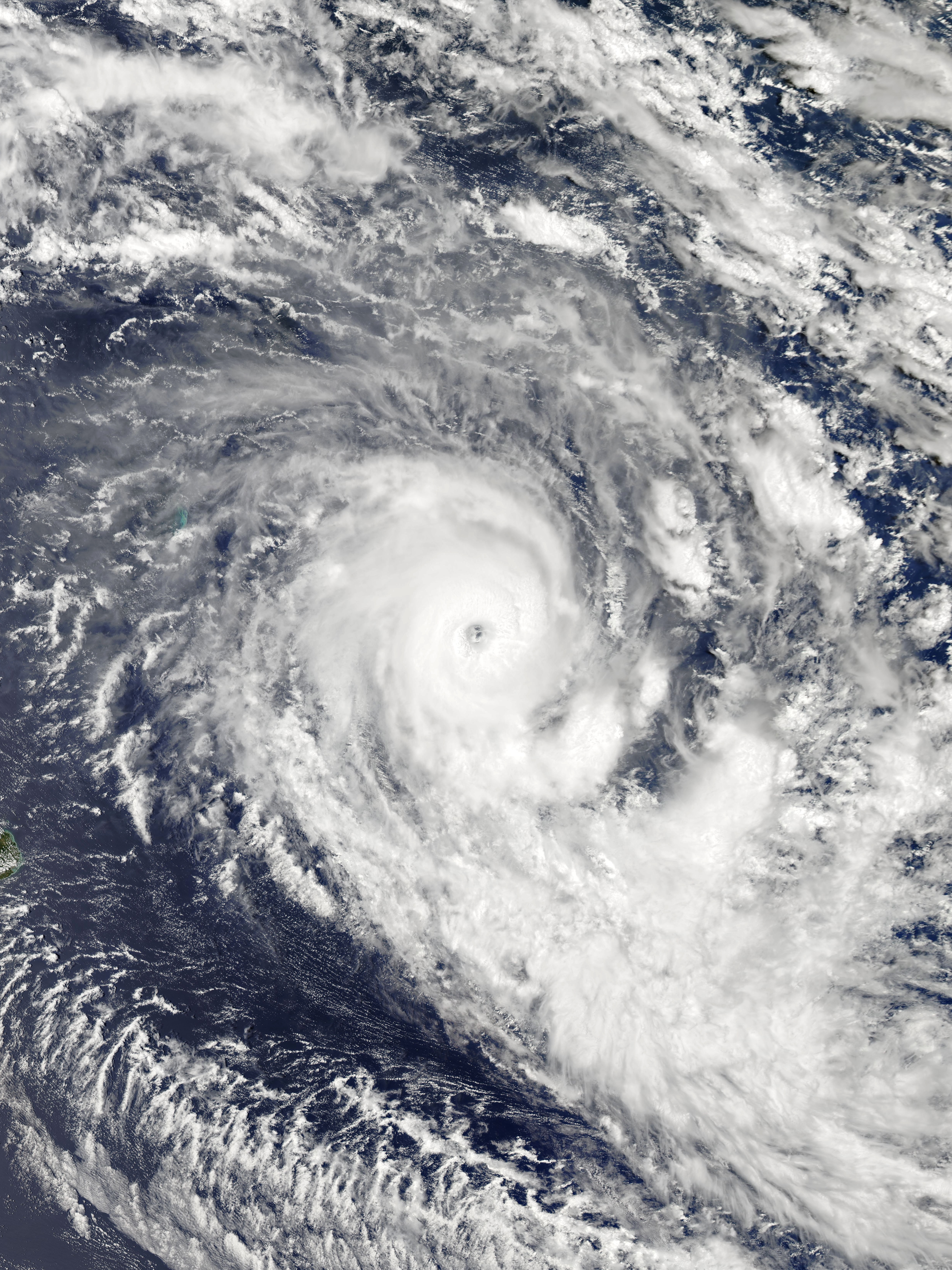
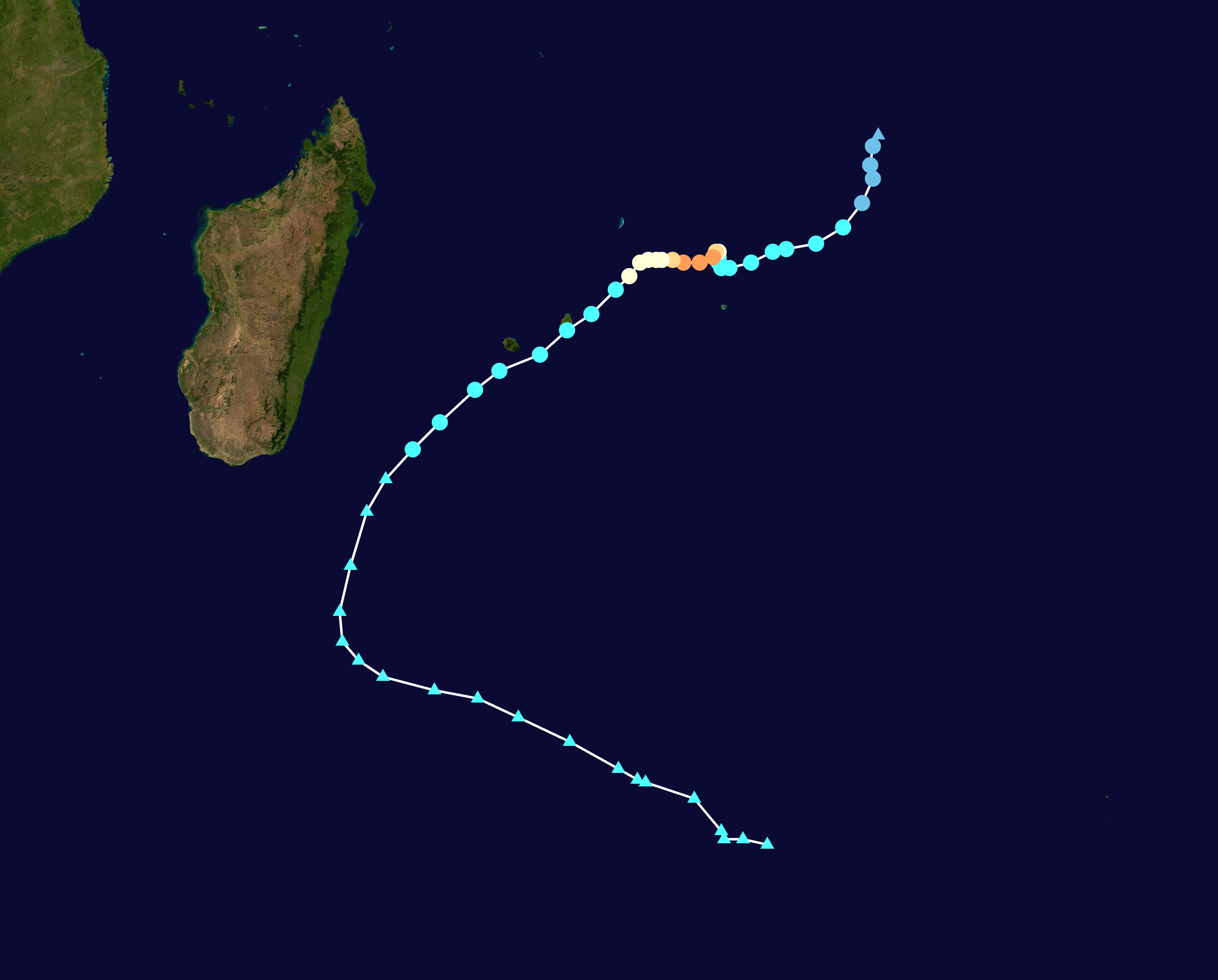
- Duration: 11 January – 19 January
- Peak intensity: 165 km/h (105 mph) (10-min); 960 hPa (mbar)

Berguitta formed on 11 January and dissipated on 19 January.

Berguitta brought damaging winds and torrential rainfall to Rodrigues. The island received nearly a quarter of its average annual rainfall during 13–15 January. As a result, severe, widescale flooding ensued, most notably in low-lying regions. Felled trees damaged powerlines and floodwaters blocked roads. On Mauritius Island, two days of nonstop rainfall from 17 to 18 January also resulted in severe flooding. The floodwaters damaged around 75–80 percent of the island's agriculture and damaged buildings. Water utilities in the capital of Port Louis were disrupted by the storm, and around 6,800 residences lost power as trees fell on electrical cables. Two people died on the island: one person fell off of a ladder and another was killed in a traffic accident. At least ₨ 2 billion (US$58 million) in economic losses occurred across the island nation. The Mauritian government allocated relief funds to at least 13,000 citizens. Protests erupted twice in the country: the first occurred as a result of delayed and small relief fund payments, and the second occurred several months later as a result of families being evicted from disaster evacuation centers.

Heavy rainfall and winds impacted Réunion on 18 January, causing flooding and landslides across the southern region of the island. The storm broke several records for rainfall, most notably at Grande Coude, where 1,862 mm (73.3 in) of rain fell during an 8-day stretch. Floodwaters damaged highways, ruined agriculture, and caused one person to go missing after they were washed away. At least 100,000 customers were left without power, and access to potable water was cut off in multiple communes. Agricultural damage was estimated to be €16.7 million (US$20.5 million), while total economic losses across Réunion were €41 million (US$50 million). The only major highway connecting Cilaos with other towns was severed by multiple landslides, bringing the local economy to a halt. The Réunion Prefecture government provided several million euros in relief aid, however, reconstruction efforts were later disrupted by cyclones Dumazile and Fakir.

=== Tropical Depression 04 ===
- Tropical depression (MFR)
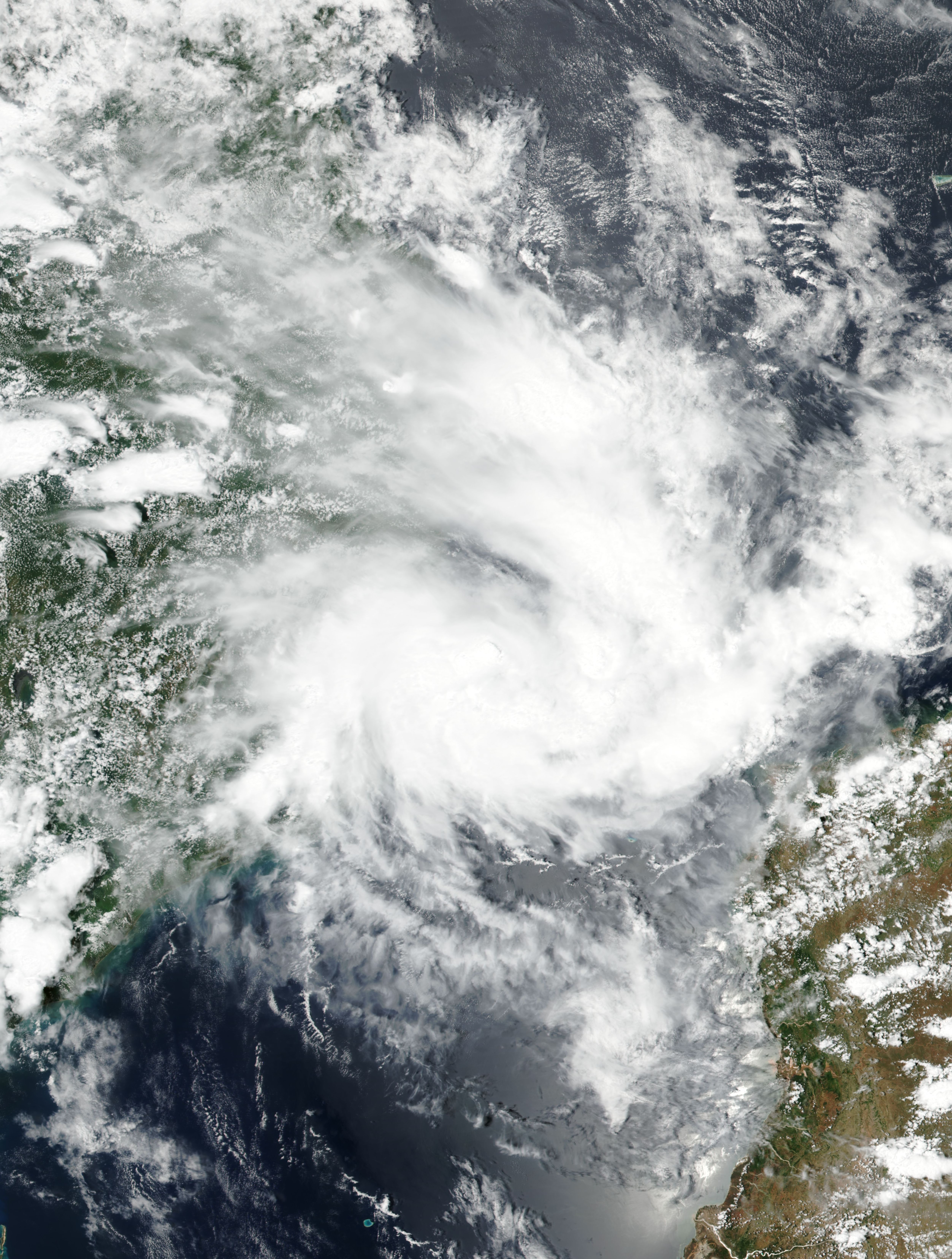
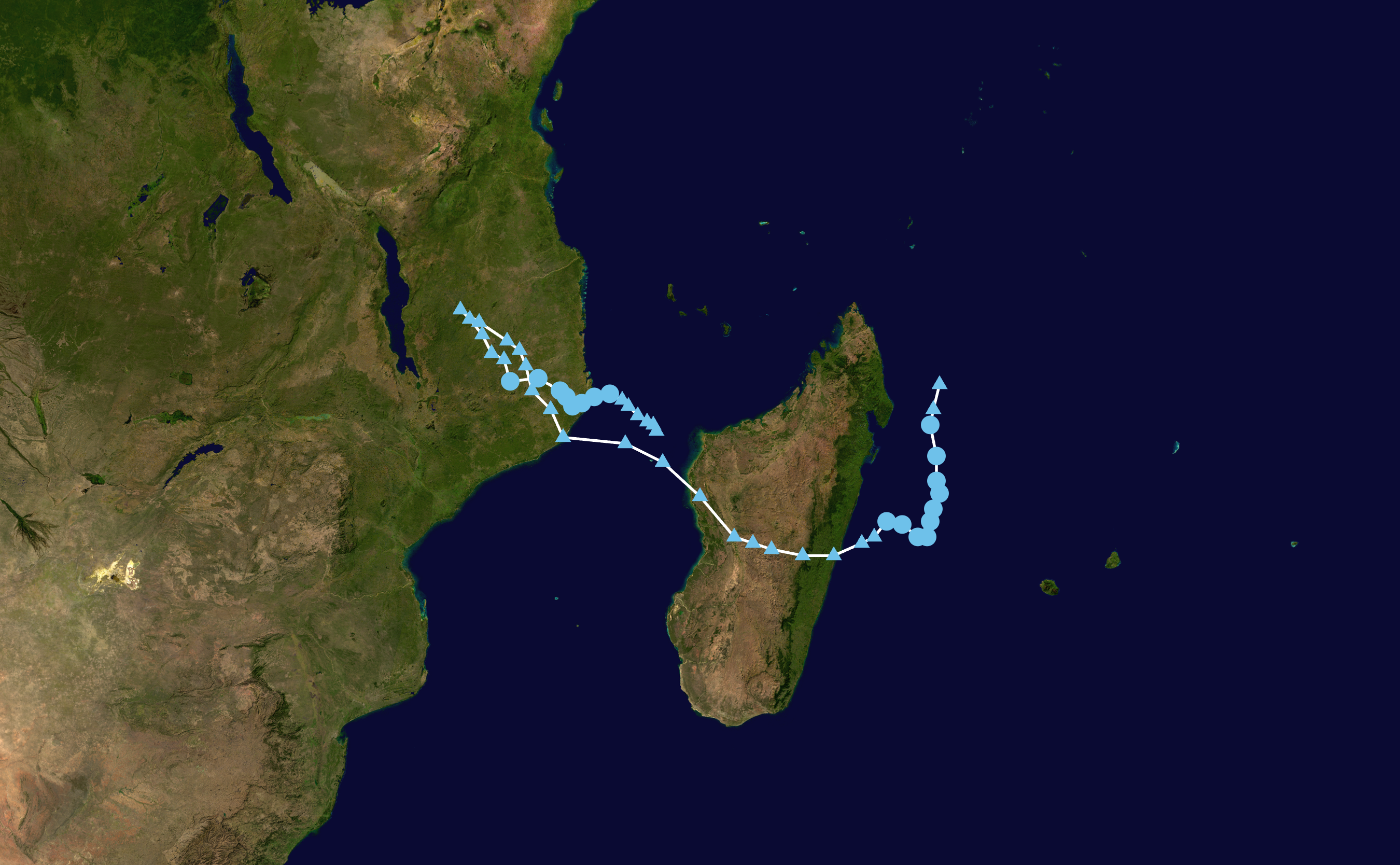
- Duration: January 14 – January 16
- Peak intensity: 55 km/h (35 mph) (10-min); 999 hPa (mbar)

The depression formed on January 14 and dissipated on January 16.

The depression formed over the Mozambique Channel before making landfall on Mozambique. Its remnants reemerged over the Mozambique Channel before moving over Madagascar. The depression regenerated after reemerging into the ocean before dissipating northeast of Madagascar.

=== Intense Tropical Cyclone Cebile ===
- Intense tropical cyclone (MFR)
- Category 4 tropical cyclone (SSHWS)
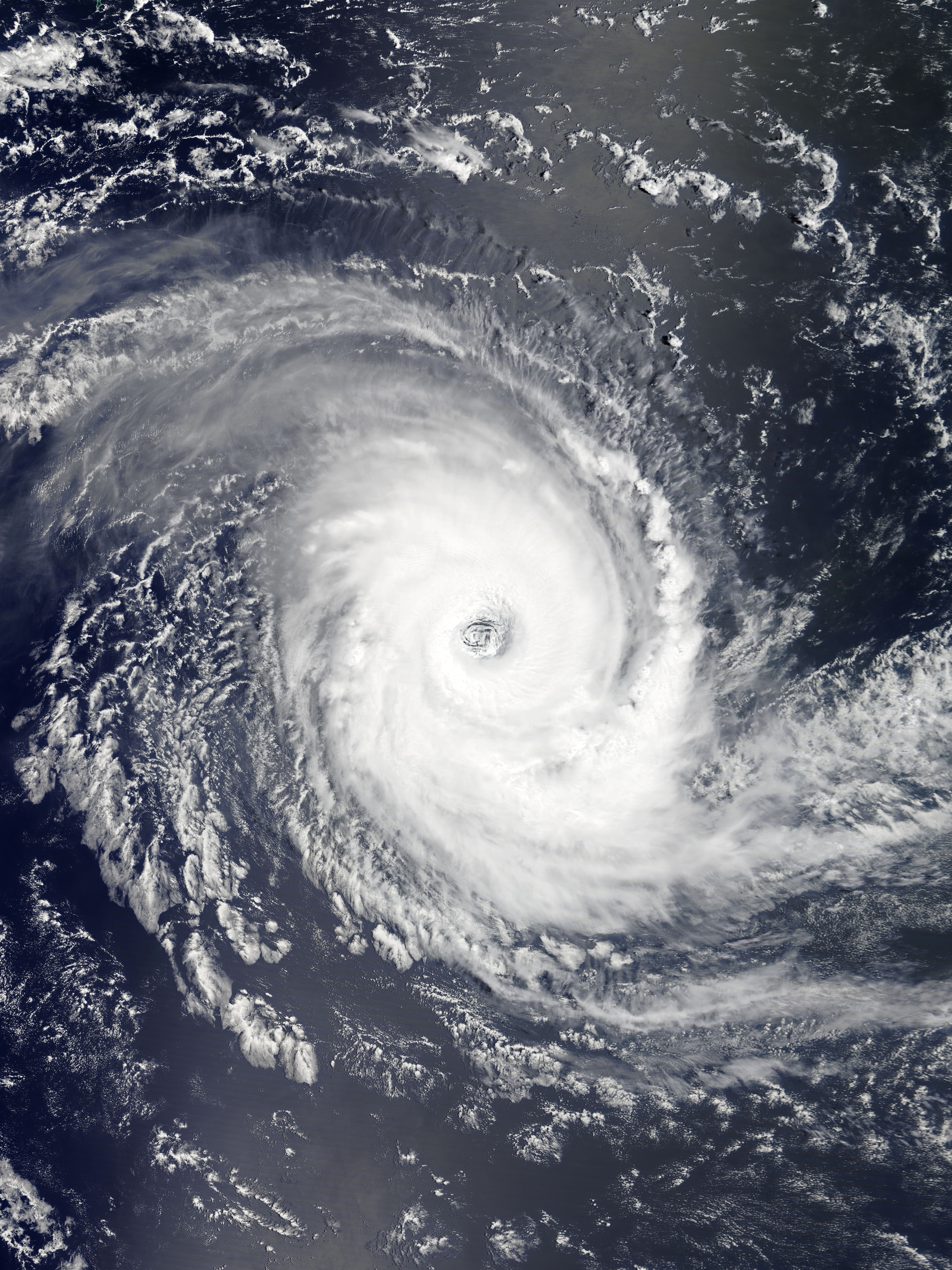
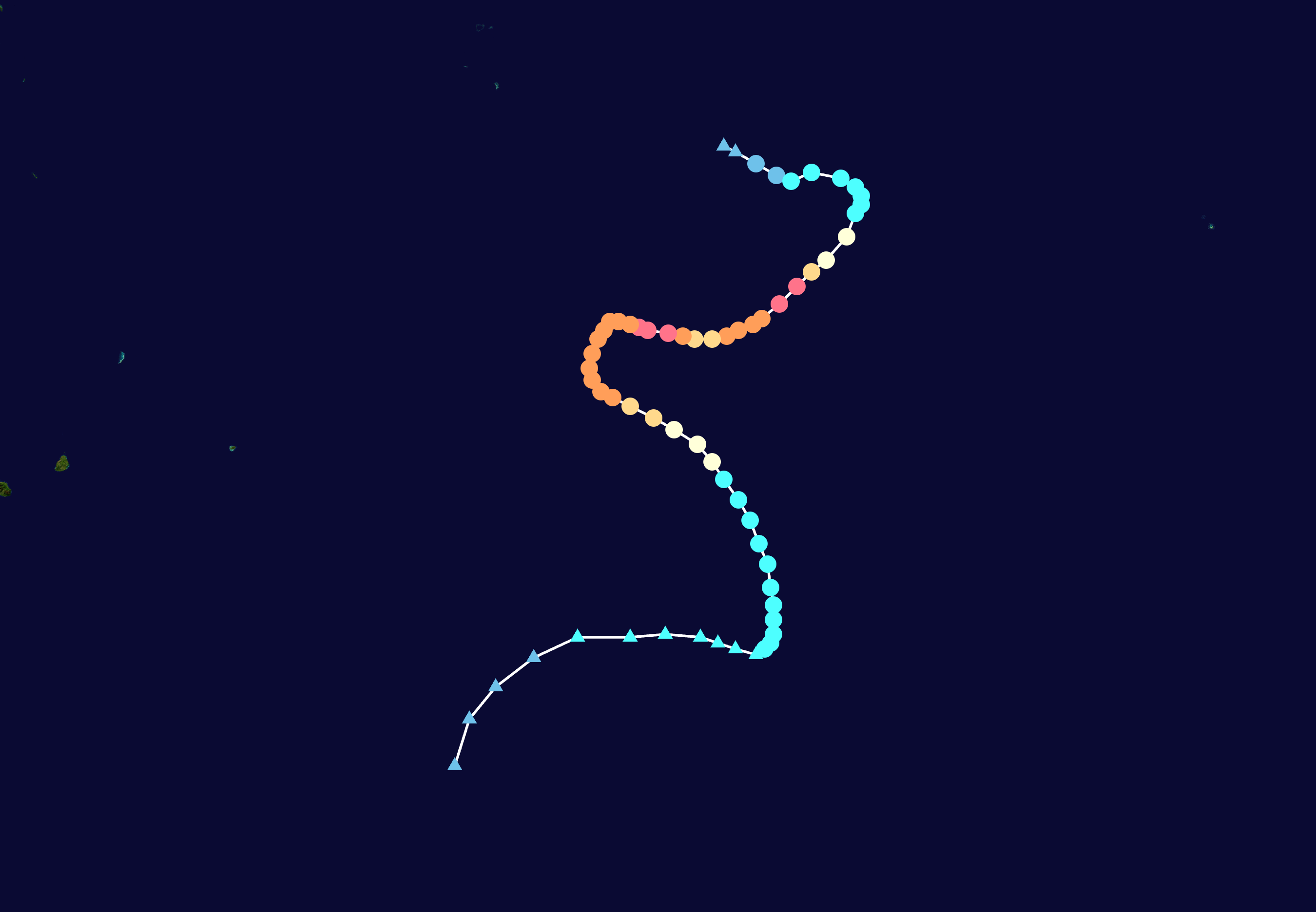
- Duration: 26 January – 7 February
- Peak intensity: 185 km/h (115 mph) (10-min); 940 hPa (mbar)

Cebile formed on 26 January and dissipated on 7 February. A long-lived cyclone, it erratically moved to the west, then to the south, then to the east, to the south, to the southeast, then to the south again, to the west, when it started to become extratropical. It peaked as an Intense Tropical Cyclone, or equivalent to a strong Category 4 cyclone. It stayed well away from land.

=== Intense Tropical Cyclone Dumazile ===
- Intense tropical cyclone (MFR)
- Category 3 tropical cyclone (SSHWS)
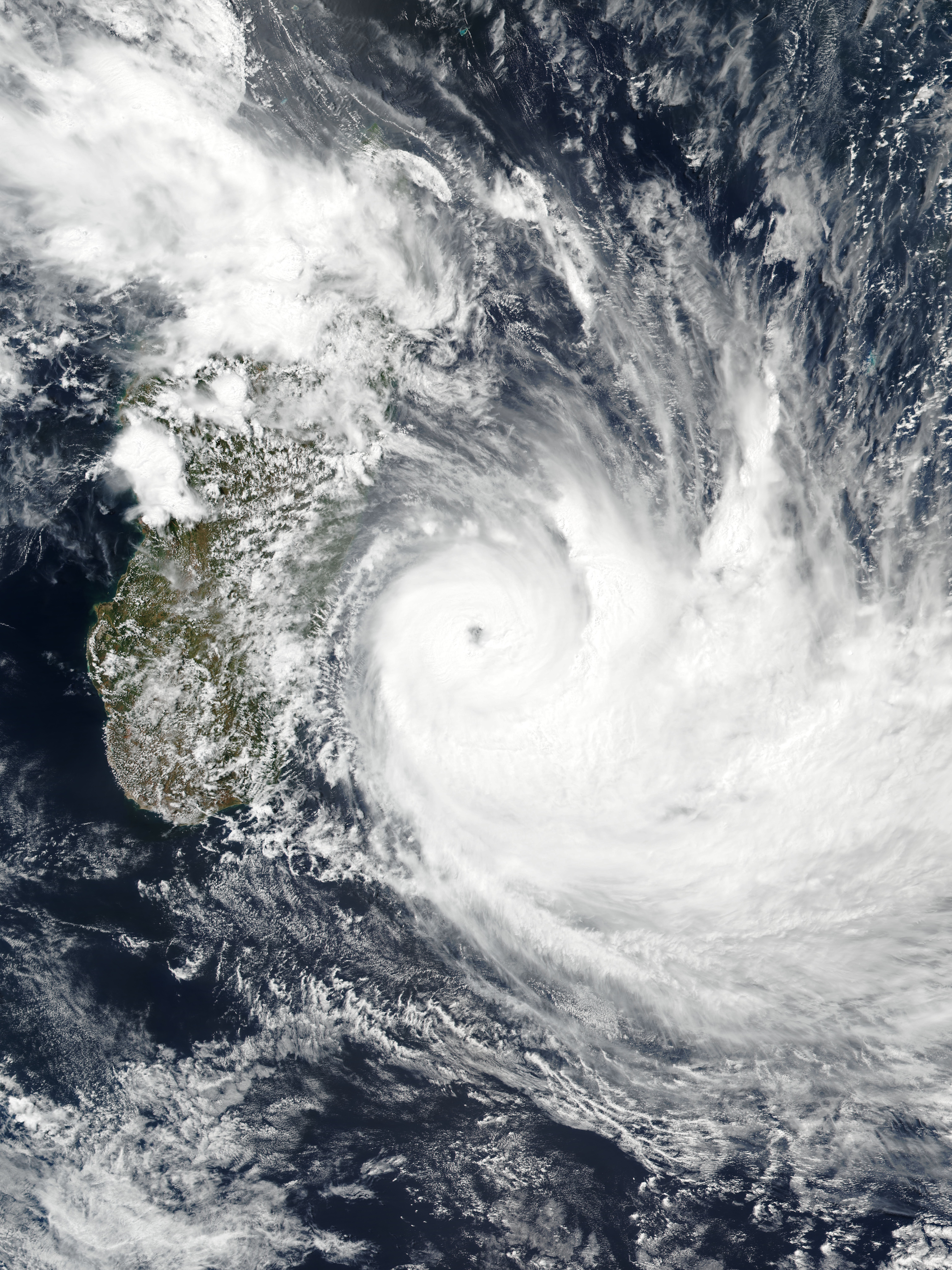
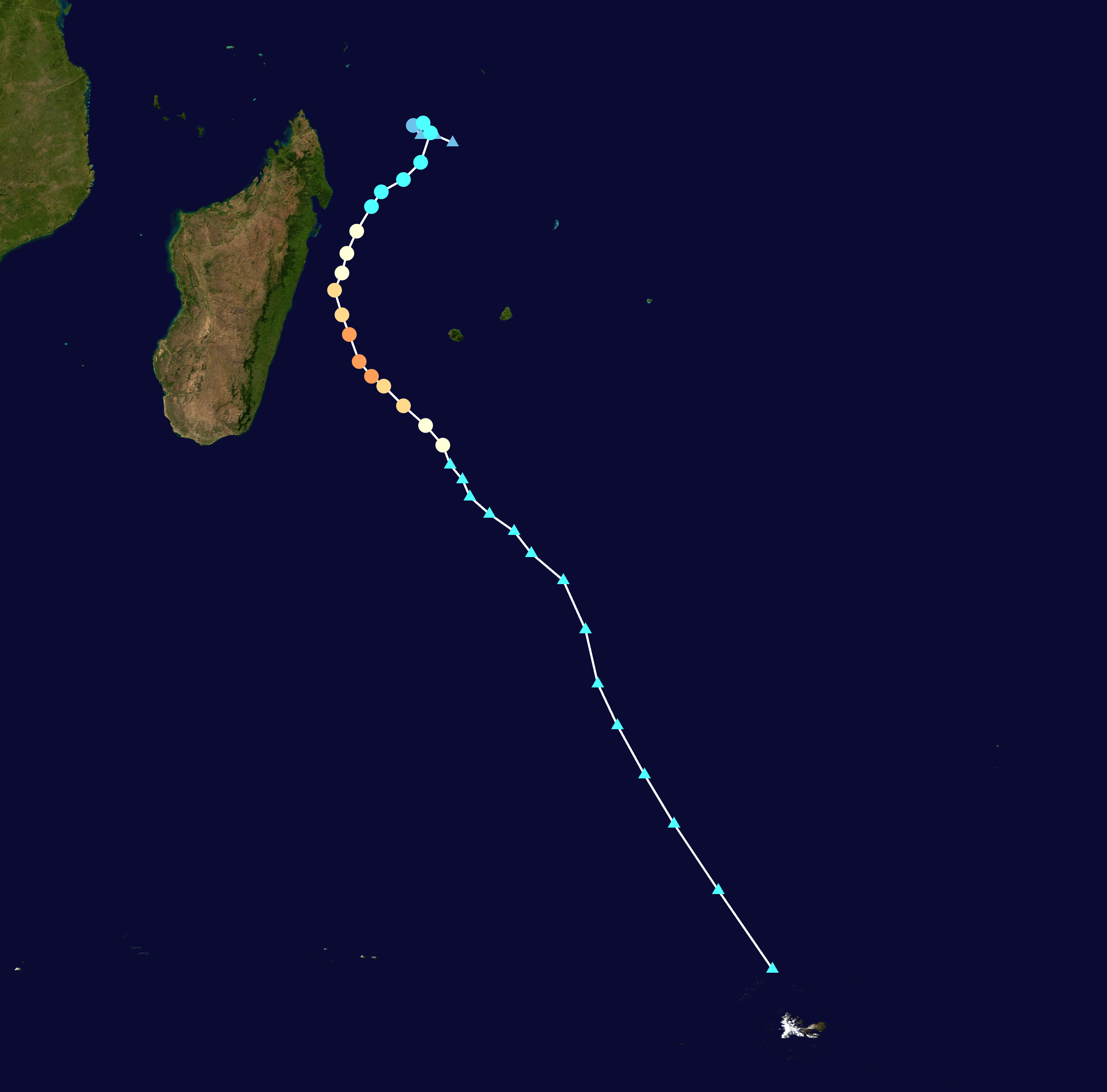
- Duration: 2 March – 6 March
- Peak intensity: 165 km/h (105 mph) (10-min); 945 hPa (mbar)

Dumazile formed from a low on 2 March. After formation, Dumazile began rounding a subtropical ridge to the east. Dumazile brought heavy rain to Madagascar. Dumazile peaked on 5 March with 10-minute sustained winds of 165 km/h (105 mph), 1-minute sustained winds of 205 km/h (125 mph), and a central pressure of 945 hPa (27.91 inHg). Dumazile then began weakening as a result of increasing shear wind from a low-pressure system to the southwest and became post-tropical early on 7 March.

Dumazile halted recovery efforts that were ongoing after Cyclone Berguitta struck the island just two months prior, causing further damage. The destruction of crops planted in the aftermath of Cyclone Berguitta led to shortages of several foods. In the coastal and mountain regions of Réunion, flooding and landslides damaged highways. High surf eroded away sand along the coast, damaged structures on beaches, and damaged ports. Severe flooding and strong winds caused €3 million (US$3.73 million) in agricultural losses across the island. Heavy rainfall and damaged drainage networks led to flooding in Toamasina, Madagascar.

=== Severe Tropical Storm Eliakim ===
- Severe tropical storm (MFR)
- Category 1 tropical cyclone (SSHWS)
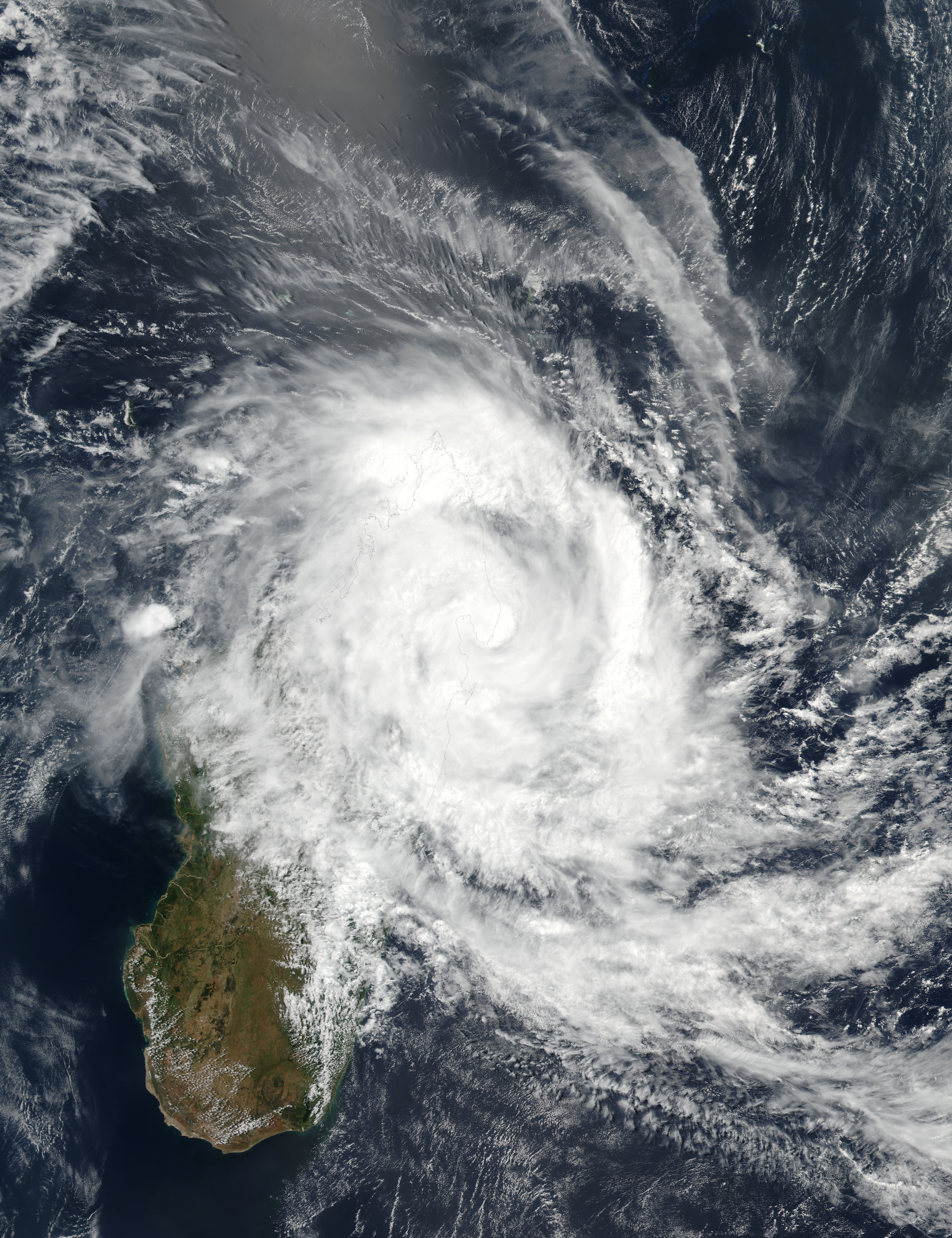
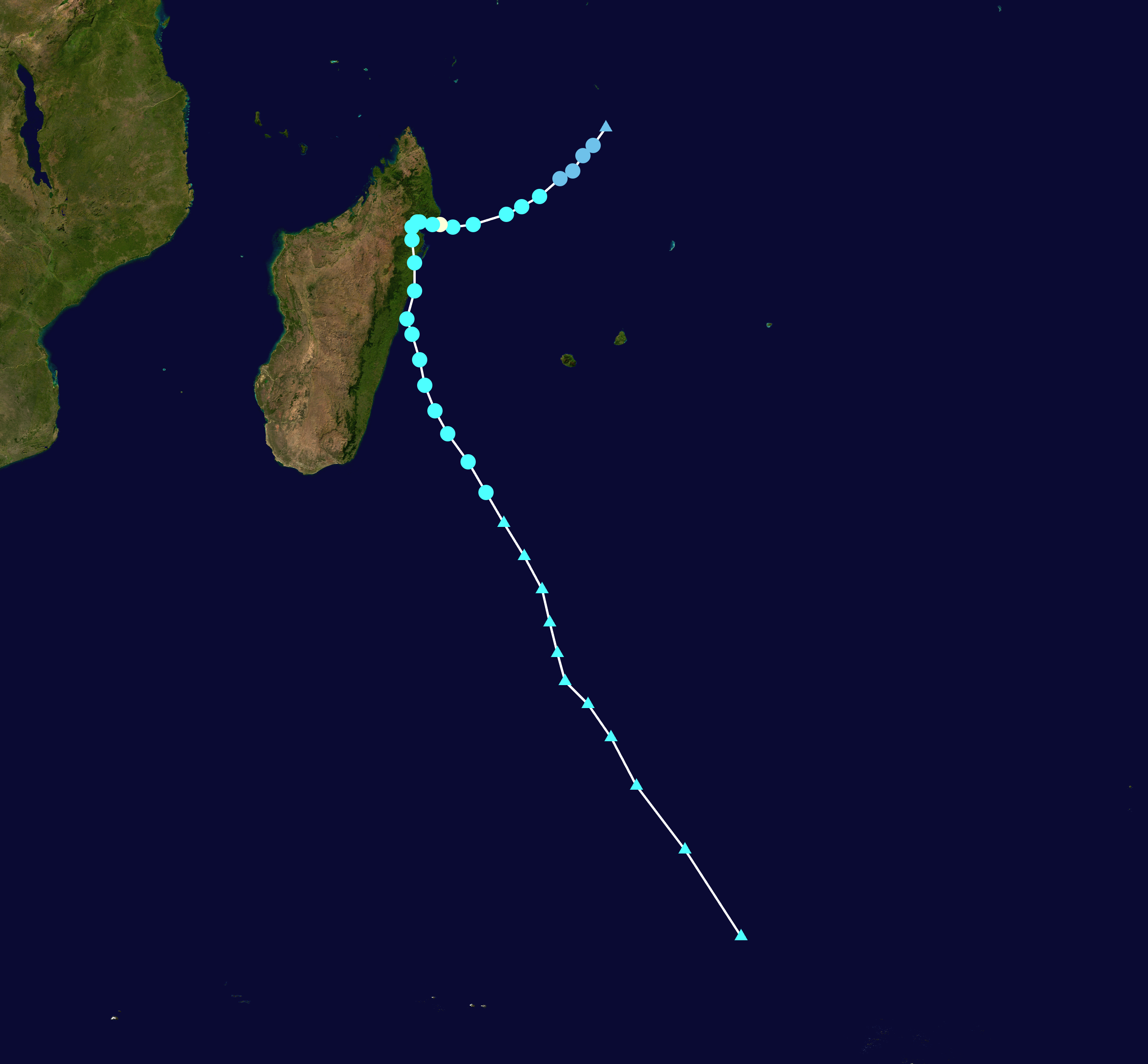
- Duration: 14 March – 20 March
- Peak intensity: 110 km/h (70 mph) (10-min); 980 hPa (mbar)

Eliakim formed on 14 March and dissipated on 20 March.

Eliakim made landfall on Madagascar on 16 March. Thousands of endangered individuals were evacuated. A peak rainfall total of 388 mm (15.3 in) was observed in Île Sainte-Marie. The torrential rainfall caused severe flooding across multiple regions. At least 21 people were killed by the storm and another 19,400 were left homeless. Over 17,200 homes, 1,100 classrooms, 27 healthcare facilities, and 15 roads sustained damage. The costs of repairing the damage were estimated to be 10 billion Malagasy ariary (US$3.21 million). The island of Réunion saw high surf reaching 5–6 m (16–20 ft) in height, and regions of Kenya were flooded.

=== Tropical Cyclone Fakir ===
- Tropical cyclone (MFR)
- Category 1 tropical cyclone (SSHWS)
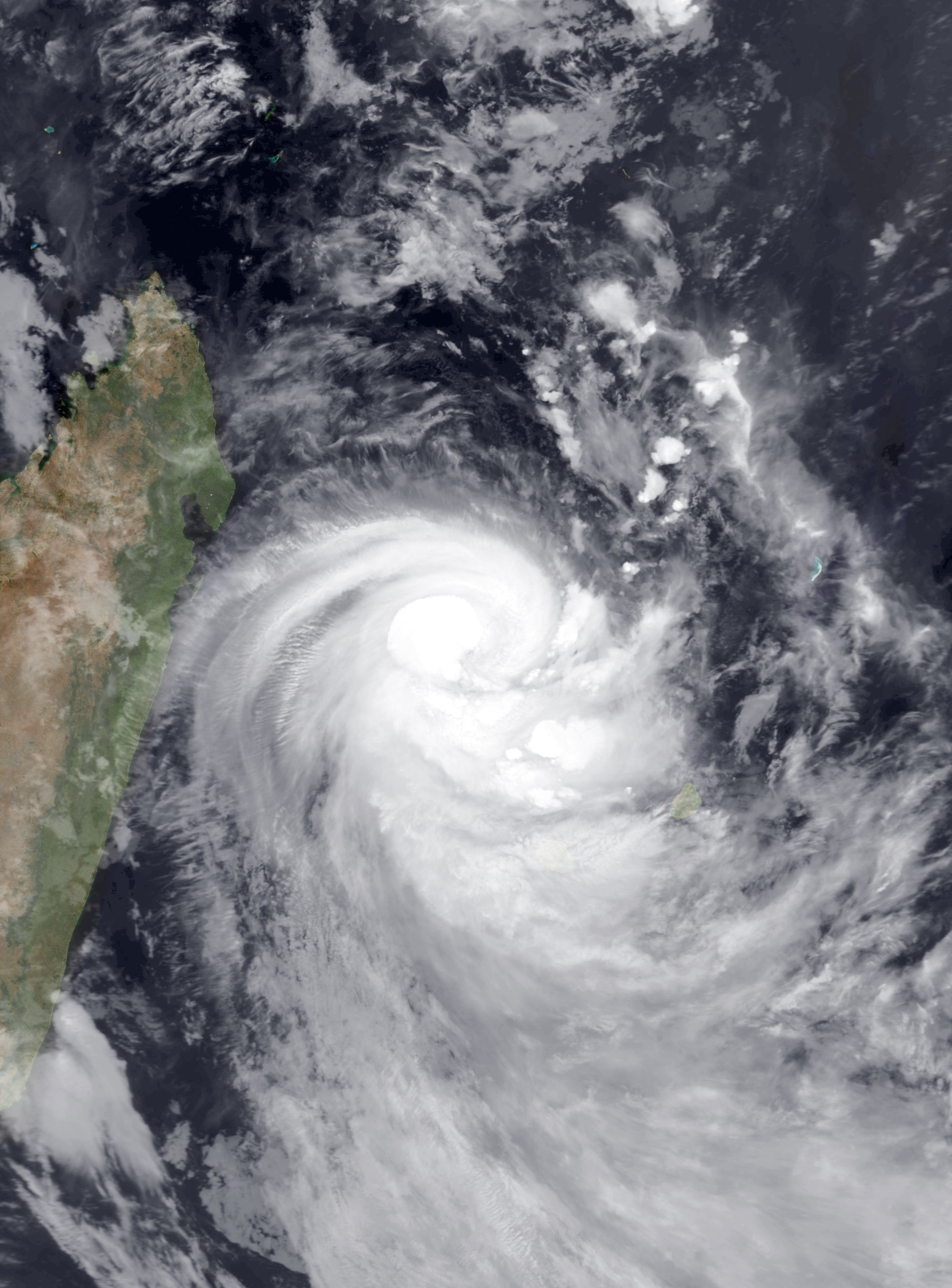
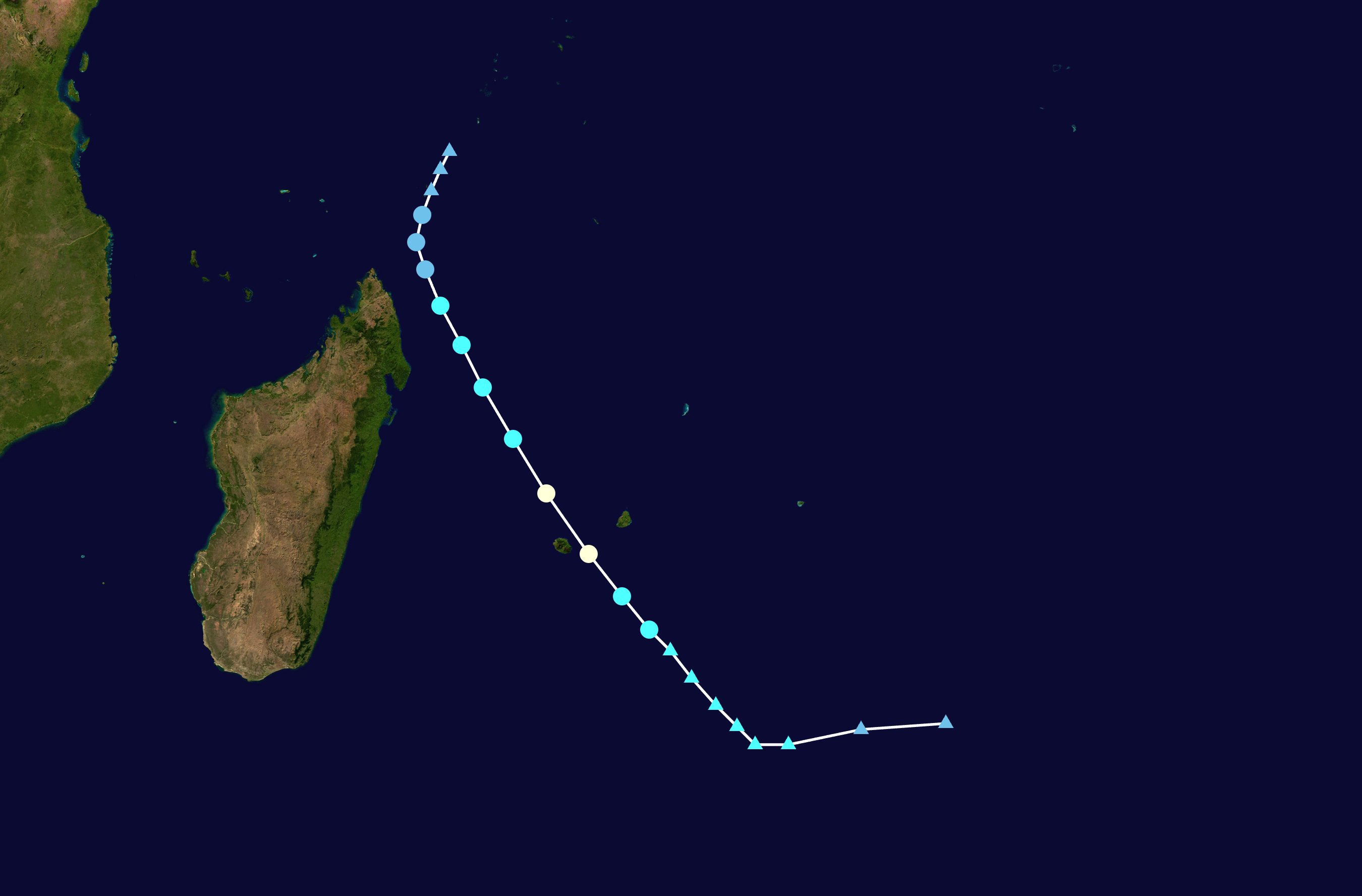
- Duration: 22 April – 24 April
- Peak intensity: 130 km/h (80 mph) (10-min); 975 hPa (mbar)

Fakir formed on 22 April and became post-tropical on 24 April.

Fakir dumped torrential rainfall across Réunion from 25 to 26 April, resulting in flooding and landslides. Blackouts occurred around the island after electrical lines were either blown down by winds or damaged by collapsing trees. Access to potable water was restricted in some areas. Floodwaters and mudslides caused significant damage to residential and public buildings. Two people died in L'Étang-Salé after a mudslide buried their house. The heavy rainfall and ensuing floods devastated agriculture, destroying crops and drowning livestock. Damage in Réunion was estimated at €15 million (US$17.7 million). Disaster declarations were activated in 15 municipalities shortly after the storm. In the months after, local and departmental governments provided aid to farmers. The price of fruits and vegetables was significantly higher up to six months after Fakir. In Mauritius, trees were felled, crops were damaged, and highways were flooded.

=== Severe Tropical Storm Flamboyan ===
- Severe tropical storm (MFR)
- Category 1 tropical cyclone (SSHWS)
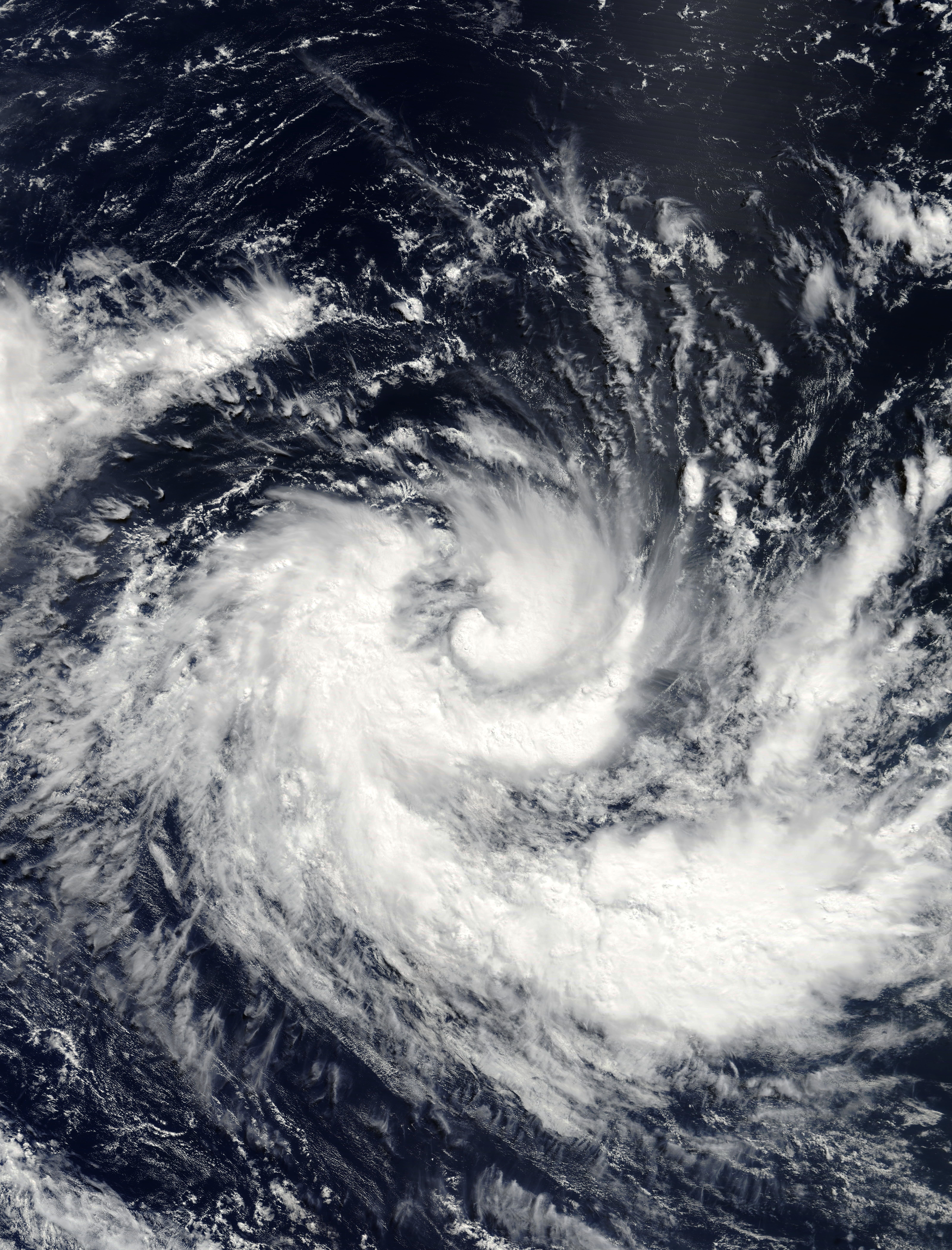
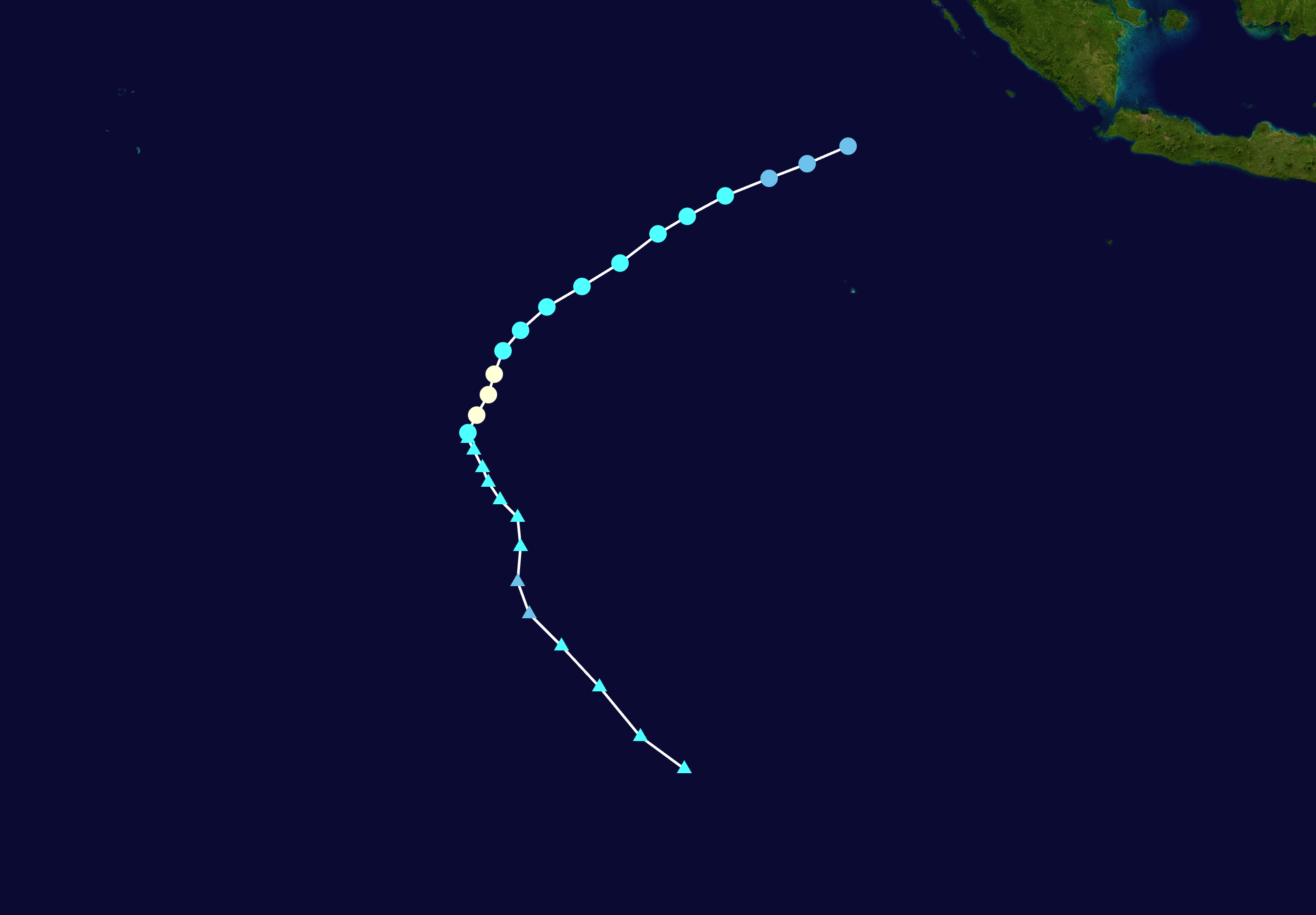
- Duration: 28 April (Entered basin) – 1 May
- Peak intensity: 110 km/h (70 mph) (10-min); 978 hPa (mbar)

Toward the end of April, a westward-moving Rossby wave spawned a tropical low in the Australian basin southwest of Indonesia. It moved generally to the southwest around a ridge to its southeast. The low eventually intensified into the equivalent of a moderate tropical storm, whereupon TCWC Jakarta named it Flamboyan. On April 28, Flamboyan crossed into the south-west Indian Ocean. It was located in an area of low shear, with a compact area of thunderstorms near the center. The storm fluctuated in intensity over the next day due to dry air, before it strengthened to its peak on April 30. The MFR estimated peak 10 minute winds of 110 km/h (70 mph), making Flamboyan a severe tropical storm, while the JTWC assessed a higher peak of 130 km/h (80 mph), the equivalent of a minimal hurricane. At its peak, the storm had an eye feature in the center of its convection. Thereafter, Flamboyan began weakening due to increased wind shear and cooler waters, while it curved to the south around a ridge. By May 1, the circulation was exposed from the convection, signaling that the storm was no longer tropical. Flamboyan accelerated to the southeast, and was last noted by the MFR on May 4 re-entering the Australian basin.

=== Other systems ===
The first disturbance of this season, a low-pressure system, classified as a tropical low by the Australian Bureau of Meteorology, moved west-southwestward across the 90th meridian east into the South-West Indian Ocean basin on August 8. At 10:00 UTC on the following day, Météo-France Réunion upgraded the low-pressure system to a zone of disturbed weather, with sustained winds of up to 55 km/h (35 mph) being detected on the southern side of the circulation by scatterometer. At this time, the disturbance was located approximately 2,375 km (1,475 mi) west of Jakarta, Indonesia. Météo-France noted that the revival of convective activity in the basin was likely due to the interaction between an eastward-moving Kelvin wave and a westward-moving Rossby wave. The disturbance moved westward without much development, eventually merging with the near-equatorial trough on August 13.

== Storm names ==
Within the South-West Indian Ocean, tropical depressions and subtropical depressions that are judged to have 10-minute sustained wind speeds of 65 km/h (40 mph) by the Regional Specialized Meteorological Center on La Réunion Island, France (RSMC La Réunion) are usually assigned a name. However, it is the Sub-Regional Tropical Cyclone Advisory Centers in Mauritius and Madagascar who name the systems. The Sub-Regional Tropical Cyclone Advisory Center in Mauritius names a storm should it intensify into a moderate tropical storm between 55°E and 90°E. If instead a cyclone intensifies into a moderate tropical storm between 30°E and 55°E then the Sub-Regional Tropical Cyclone Advisory Center in Madagascar assigns the appropriate name to the storm.

Beginning with the 2016–17 season, name lists within the South-West Indian Ocean have been rotated on a triennial basis. Storm names are only used once, thus any storm name used this year would be removed from rotation and replaced with a new name for the 2020–21 season. Names not used in 2017–18 would remain on the list for the 2020–21 season.

- Ava
- Berguitta
- Cebile
- Dumazile
- Eliakim
- Fakir
- Guambe (unused)
- Habana (unused)
- Iman (unused)
- Jobo (unused)
- Kanga (unused)
- Ludzi (unused)
- Melina (unused)
- Nathan (unused)
- Onias (unused)
- Pelagie (unused)
- Quamar (unused)
- Rita (unused)
- Solani (unused)
- Tarik (unused)
- Urilia (unused)
- Vuyane (unused)
- Wagner (unused)
- Xusa (unused)
- Yarona (unused)
- Zacarias (unused)

After the season, the six names used were automatically retired and were replaced with Alicia, Bongoyo, Chalane, Danilo, Eloise and Faraji, respectively for the 2020–21 season.

== Seasonal effects ==
This table lists all of the tropical cyclones and subtropical cyclones that were monitored during the 2017–2018 South-West Indian Ocean cyclone season. Information on their intensity, duration, name, areas affected, primarily comes from RSMC La Réunion. Death and damage reports come from either press reports or the relevant national disaster management agency while the damage totals are given in 2017 or 2018 USD.

Name	Dates	Peak intensity			Areas affected	Damage (USD)	Deaths	Ref(s).
Name	Dates	Category	Wind speed	Pressure	Areas affected	Damage (USD)	Deaths	Ref(s).
Ava	1–9 January	Tropical cyclone	150 km/h (90 mph)	965 hPa (28.50 inHg)	Madagascar	$195 million	51	
Irving	6–9 January	Tropical cyclone	150 km/h (90 mph)	965 hPa (28.50 inHg)	None	None	None	
Berguitta	11–19 January	Intense tropical cyclone	165 km/h (105 mph)	960 hPa (28.35 inHg)	Mauritius, Réunion	$107 million	2	
04	14–16 January	Tropical depression	55 km/h (35 mph)	999 hPa (29.50 inHg)	Madagascar, Mozambique	None	None	
Cebile	26 January – 7 February	Intense tropical cyclone	185 km/h (115 mph)	940 hPa (27.76 inHg)	None	None	None	
Dumazile	2–6 March	Intense tropical cyclone	165 km/h (105 mph)	945 hPa (27.91 inHg)	Madagascar, Réunion	$3.73 million	2	
Eliakim	14–20 March	Severe tropical storm	110 km/h (70 mph)	980 hPa (28.94 inHg)	Madagascar	$3.21 million	21	
Fakir	22–24 April	Tropical cyclone	130 km/h (80 mph)	975 hPa (28.79 inHg)	Madagascar, Réunion, Mauritius	$17.7 million	2	
Flamboyan	28 April – 1 May	Severe tropical storm	110 km/h (70 mph)	978 hPa (28.88 inHg)	None	None	None	
Season aggregates
9 systems	1 January – 1 May		185 km/h (115 mph)	940 hPa (27.76 inHg)		$327 million	78	

== See also ==
- Weather of 2017 and 2018
- Tropical cyclones in 2017 and 2018
- List of Southern Hemisphere tropical cyclone seasons
- Atlantic hurricane seasons: 2017, 2018
- Pacific hurricane seasons: 2017, 2018
- Pacific typhoon seasons: 2017, 2018
- North Indian Ocean cyclone seasons: 2017, 2018
- 2017–18 Australian region cyclone season
- 2017–18 South Pacific cyclone season
- South Atlantic tropical cyclone
