= Androrangavola, Ifanadiana =

Androrangavola
- Location in Madagascar
- Coordinates: 21°30′S 47°43′E
- Country: Madagascar
- Region: Vatovavy
- District: Ifanadiana
- Elevation: 329 m (1,079 ft)

Population (2018)
  - Total: 14,709
- Time zone: UTC3 (EAT)
- Postal code: 312

Androrangavola is a rural municipality in Madagascar. It belongs to the district of Ifanadiana, which is a part of Vatovavy. The population of this municipality was 14,709 inhabitants in 2018.

Primary and junior level secondary education are available in town. The majority 99.5% of the population of the commune are farmers. The most important crops are coffee and rice, while other important agricultural products are lychee and cassava. Services provide employment for 0.5% of the population.

Androrangavola is situated on the Namorona River.
