= Marotoko =

- Location in Madagascar
- Coordinates: 21°35′S 47°46′E
- Country: Madagascar
- Region: Vatovavy-Fitovinany
- District: Ifanadiana
- Elevation: 244 m (801 ft)

Population (2001)
  - Total: 7,000
- Time zone: UTC3 (EAT)

Marotoko is a town and commune in Madagascar. It belongs to the district of Ifanadiana, which is a part of Vatovavy-Fitovinany Region. The population of the commune was estimated to be approximately 7,000 in 2001 commune census.

Only primary schooling is available. The majority 95% of the population of the commune are farmers. The most important crop is rice, while other important products are coffee, sugarcane and cassava. Services provide employment for 5% of the population.
