= Ambodiharina =

- Location in Madagascar
- Coordinates: 20°0′46.34″S 48°46′7.14″E
- Country: Madagascar
- Region: Atsinanana
- District: Mahanoro District

Population (2001)
  - Total: 20,217
- Time zone: UTC3 (EAT)
- Postal code: 510

Ambodiharina [vatʷˈmanɖʐʲ] is a municipality in the Mahanoro District, Atsinanana Region, Madagascar. The 2001 population of the municipality was 20,217.

It is located near the coast and on the south side of the mouth of the Mangoro River, and south of Mahanoro (the chief city of the district). The village of Salehy lies across from the town on the north side of the river.

It residents are of the Betsimisaraka people.

== Infrastructures ==
The National road 11 runs through the village, though one must cross the river by boat to proceed north on the road to Mahanoro.

== Rivers ==
The Mangoro River has its mouth into the Indian Ocean at Ambodiharina.
