= Kelilalina =

- Location in Madagascar
- Coordinates: 21°17′S 47°33′E
- Country: Madagascar
- Region: Vatovavy
- District: Ifanadiana
- Elevation: 620 m (2,030 ft)

Population (2018)Census
  - Total: 10,747
- Time zone: UTC3 (EAT)

Kelilalina is a town and commune in Madagascar. It belongs to the district of Ifanadiana, which is a part of Vatovavy. This municipality has a population of 10,747 inhabitants in 2018.

Only primary schooling is available. The majority 98.95% of the population of the commune are farmers. The most important crop is rice, while other important products are bananas, coffee and cassava. Services provide employment for 1.05% of the population.

== Rivers ==
The Namorona River flows by this town.
