= Ankazotsifantatra =

- Location in Madagascar
- Coordinates: 19°57′S 48°33′E
- Country: Madagascar
- Region: Atsinanana
- District: Mahanoro District

Population (2005)
  - Total: 9,880
- Time zone: UTC3 (EAT)
- postal code: 510

Ankazotsifantatra is a rural commune located in Atsinanana at the east coast of Madagascar.

Its economy is based on agriculture, notably coffee and cloves.
