= Maroharatra =

- Location in Madagascar
- Coordinates: 20°44′S 47°46′E
- Country: Madagascar
- Region: Vatovavy-Fitovinany
- District: Ifanadiana
- Elevation: 559 m (1,834 ft)

Population (2001)
  - Total: 10,000
- Time zone: UTC+3 (EAT)

Maroharatra is a town and commune in Madagascar. It belongs to the district of Ifanadiana, which is a part of Vatovavy-Fitovinany Region. The population of the commune was estimated to be approximately 10,000 in 2001 commune census.

Only primary schooling is available. According to a 2001 census, the majority 99% of the population of the commune are farmers. The most important crops are coffee and rice, while other important agricultural products are bananas and cassava. Services provide employment for 1% of the population.
