= Betsizaraina =

- Location in Madagascar
- Coordinates: 19°57′S 48°45′E
- Country: Madagascar
- Region: Atsinanana
- District: Mahanoro District

Population (2019)
  - Total: 22,409
- Time zone: UTC3 (EAT)
- postal code: 510

Betsizaraina is a rural commune located in Atsinanana, at the east coast of Madagascar. It is located south of Mahanoro at the mouth of the Mangoro River to the Indian Ocean.

== Agriculture ==
The economy is based on agriculture, including cloves oil.
