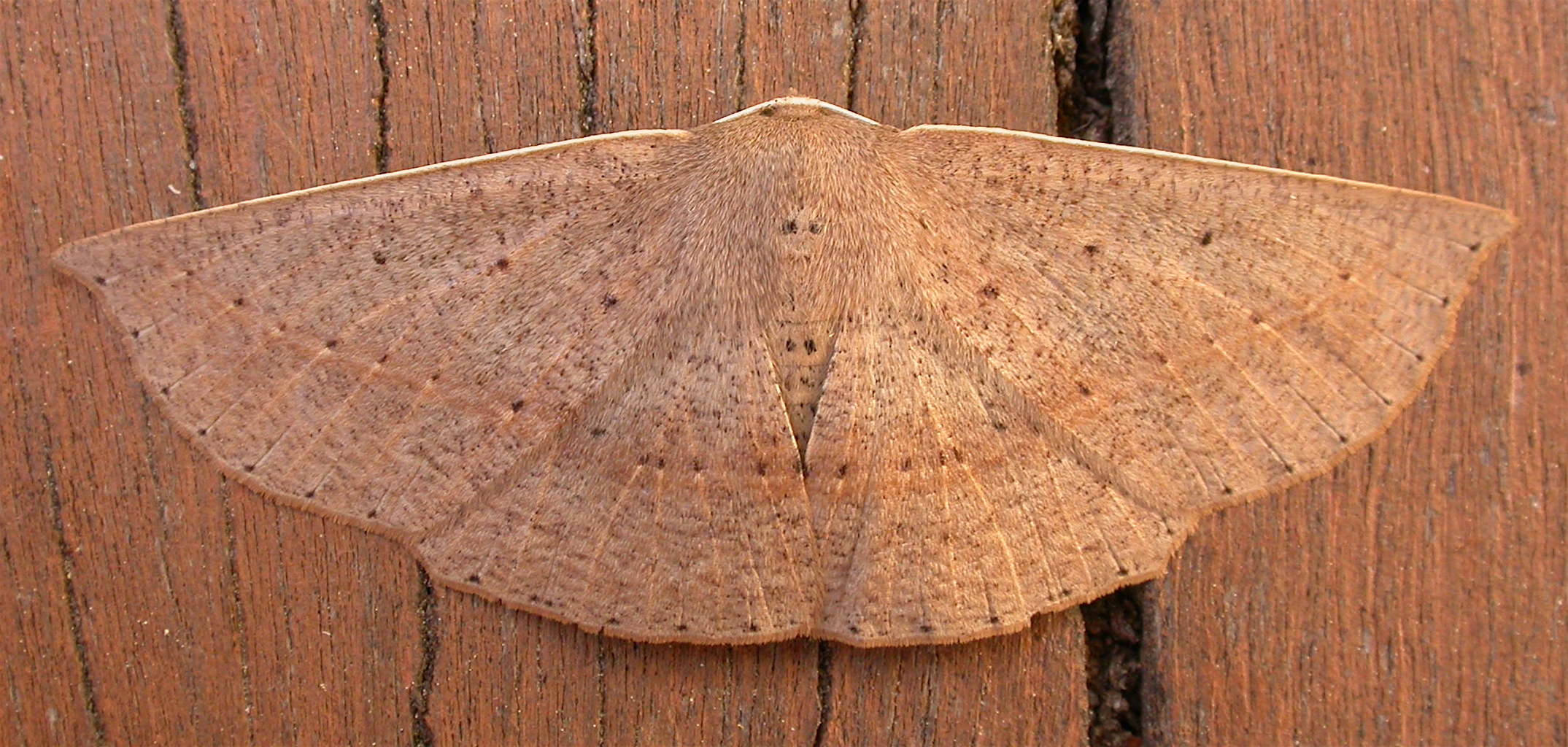

Scientific classification
- Domain: Eukaryota
- Kingdom: Animalia
- Phylum: Arthropoda
- Class: Insecta
- Order: Lepidoptera
- Family: Geometridae
- Genus: Idiodes
- Species: I. siculoides

Binomial name
- Idiodes siculoides Walker (1860)

= Idiodes siculoides =

Species of moth

Idiodes siculoides is a moth species of the subfamily Ennominae that occurs in Australia.
