= Analampasina =

- Location in Madagascar
- Coordinates: 20°50′S 47°33′E
- Country: Madagascar
- Region: Vatovavy-Fitovinany
- District: Ifanadiana
- Elevation: 625 m (2,051 ft)

Population (2001)
  - Total: 6,000
- Time zone: UTC3 (EAT)

Analampasina is a town and commune in Madagascar. It belongs to the district of Ifanadiana, which is a part of Vatovavy-Fitovinany Region. The population of the commune was estimated to be approximately 6,000 in 2001 commune census.

Only primary schooling is available. The majority 98% of the population of the commune are farmers. The most important crop is rice, while other important products are pineapple, coffee and cassava. Services provide employment for 2% of the population.
