= Tsaratanana, Ifanadiana =

Tsaratanana
- Location in Madagascar
- Coordinates: 21°11′S 47°38′E
- Country: Madagascar
- Region: Vatovavy
- District: Ifanadiana
- Elevation: 463 m (1,519 ft)

Population (2018)
  - Total: 23,252
- Time zone: UTC3 (EAT)
- Postal code: 312

Tsaratanana is a town and commune in Madagascar. It belongs to the district of Ifanadiana, which is a part of the region of Vatovavy. The population of the commune was 23,252 in 2018.

Primary and junior level secondary education are available in town. The majority 93% of the population of the commune are farmers. The most important crops are rice and beans, while other important agricultural products are coffee and cassava. Services provide employment for 7% of the population.
