= Masomeloka =

- Location in Madagascar
- Coordinates: 20°16′47.68″S 48°37′32.97″E
- Country: Madagascar
- Region: Atsinanana Region
- District: Mahanoro District

Population (2001)
  - Total: 27,567 (commune)
- Time zone: UTC3 (EAT)
- Postal code: 510

Masomeloka [vatʷˈmanɖʐʲ] is a village and commune in the Mahanoro District, Atsinanana Region, Madagascar.

It is located near the Indian Ocean on the south side of Masora River. It is approximately 47 km south of Mahanoro, the chief city of the district. The 2001 population of the commune was 27,567.

The National road 11 runs through the village, though one must cross the river by boat to proceed north.

== Rivers ==
Masomeloka lies at the small Masora River.
