= Ambinanindrano =

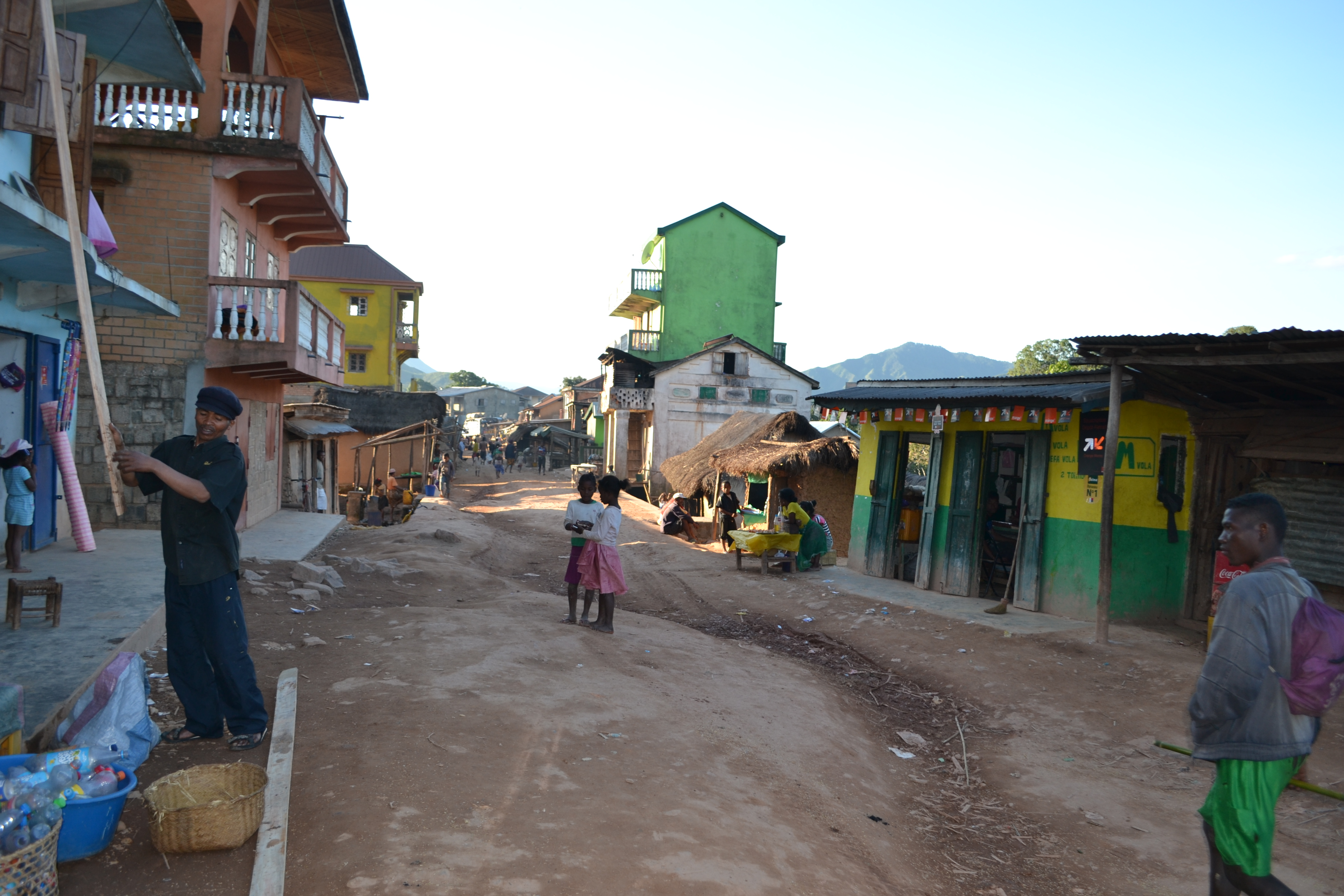
- Ambinanindrano

- Location in Madagascar
- Coordinates: 20°16′S 47°09′E
- Country: Madagascar
- Region: Atsinanana
- District: Mahanoro District

Population (2019)census
  - Total: 34,143
  - Ethnicities: Betsimisaraka
- Time zone: UTC3 (EAT)
- Postal code: 513

Ambinanindrano is a rural municipality located in the Mahanoro District, Atsinanana region of eastern Madagascar

It is situated at 60 km East of Marolambo on the road to Mahanoro. It can be reached by 4-wheeled cars and only during the dry season.
