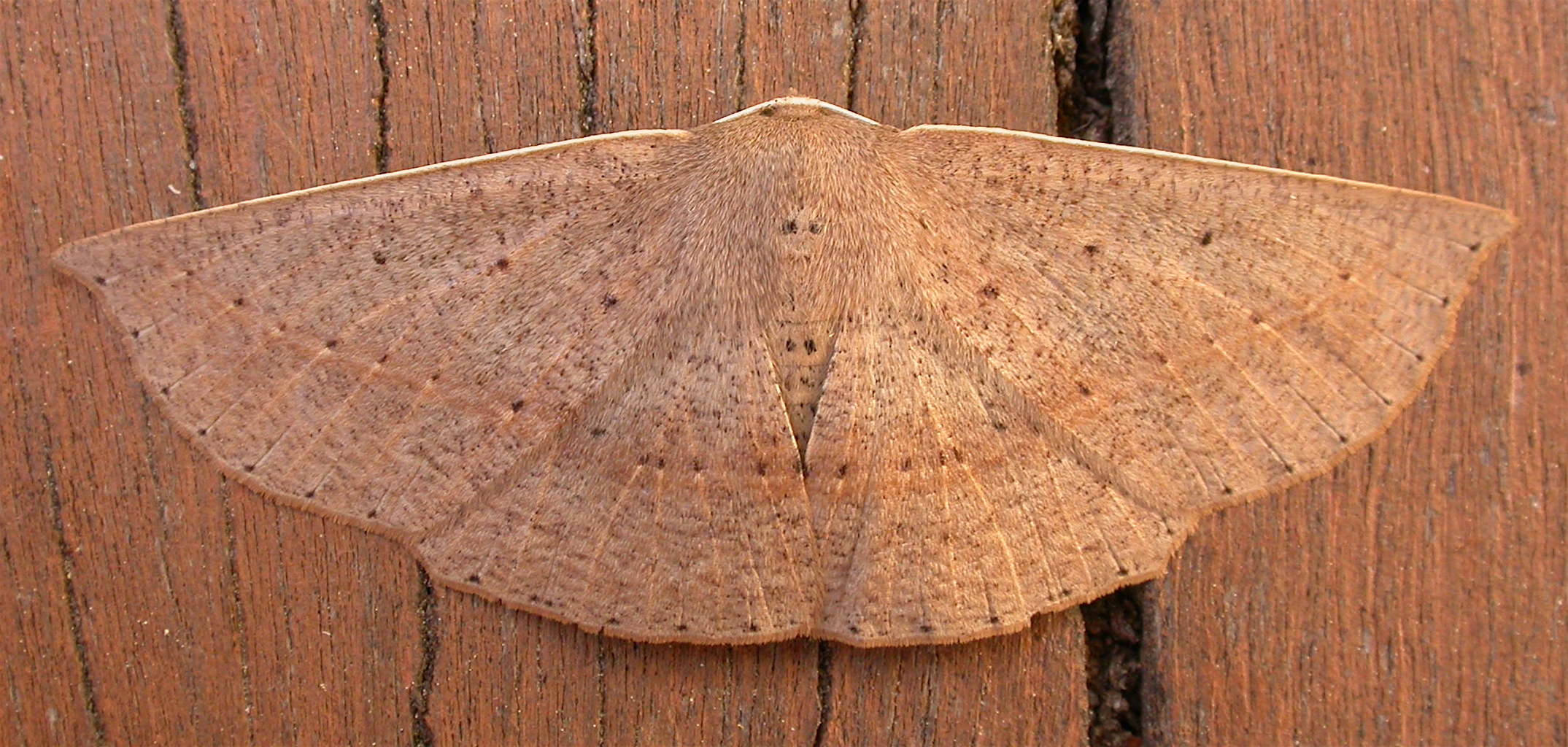
- Idiodes siculoides

Scientific classification
- Kingdom: Animalia
- Phylum: Arthropoda
- Class: Insecta
- Order: Lepidoptera
- Family: Geometridae
- Subfamily: Ennominae
- Tribe: Lithinini
- Genus: Idiodes; Guenée, 1858

Type species
- Idiodes apicata Guenée, 1857

Synonyms
- Choara Walker, 1860; Nopia Walker, 1862; Threneta Turner, 1947

= Idiodes =

Genus of moths

Idiodes is a genus of moths in the family Geometridae first described by Achille Guenée in 1858.

== Species ==
Some species of this genus are:

- Idiodes albilinea (Thierry-Mieg, 1907)
- Idiodes albistriga (Warren, 1899)
- Idiodes andravahana Viette, 1968
- Idiodes andriana Viette, 1968
- Idiodes andrivola Viette, 1968
- Idiodes apicata Guenée, 1857 (Australia)
- Idiodes avelona Viette, 1968
- Idiodes fletcherana Viette, 1968
- Idiodes flexilinea (Warren, 1898)
- Idiodes gracilipes Herbulot, 1954
- Idiodes herbuloti (Viette, 1981)
- Idiodes idiocrossa (Turner, 1947) (Australia)
- Idiodes oberthueri (Dognin, 1911)
- Idiodes pectinata (Herbulot, 1966)
- Idiodes radiata Herbulot, 1957
- Idiodes saxaria (Guenée, 1858)
- Idiodes siculoides Walker (1860) (Australia)
