= Antaretra =

- Location in Madagascar
- Coordinates: 21°4′S 47°51′E
- Country: Madagascar
- Region: Vatovavy
- District: Ifanadiana
- Elevation: 320 m (1,050 ft)

Population (2001)
  - Total: 10,000
- Time zone: UTC3 (EAT)
- Postal code: 312

Antaretra is a municipality in Madagascar. It belongs to the district of Ifanadiana, which is a part of Vatovavy-Fitovinany Region. The population of the commune was estimated to be approximately 10,000 in 2001 commune census.

Only primary schooling is available. It is also a site of industrial-scale mining. The majority 97% of the population of the commune are farmers. The most important crop is rice, while other important products are coffee, lychee and cassava. Services provide employment for 3% of the population.

== Roads ==
Antaretra is situated alongside the National Road 25 that leads from Fianarantsoa to Mananjary.
