= Ambinanidilana =

Ambinanidilana Ambinanydilana
- Location in Madagascar
- Coordinates: 19°54′S 48°28′E
- Country: Madagascar
- Region: Atsinanana
- District: Mahanoro District

Area
  - Total: 587 km^{2} (227 sq mi)

Population (2005)
  - Total: 7,880
- Time zone: UTC3 (EAT)
- postal code: 510

Ambinanidilana is a rural commune located in Atsinanana on the east coast of Madagascar.
