= Ambohimera =

- Location in Madagascar
- Coordinates: 21°3′S 47°30′E
- Country: Madagascar
- Region: Vatovavy
- District: Ifanadiana
- Elevation: 832 m (2,730 ft)

Population (2018)
  - Total: 13,983
- Time zone: UTC3 (EAT)
- Postal code: 312

Ambohimera is a town and commune in Madagascar. It belongs to the district of Ifanadiana, which is a part of the region of Vatovavy. The population of the commune was 13,983 in the 2018.

Only primary schooling is available. majority 95% of the population of the commune are farmers. The most important crops are cassava and rice, while other important agricultural products are bananas, coffee and sugarcane. Services provide employment for 5% of the population.
