= Ambodibonara =

- Location in Madagascar
- Country: Madagascar
- Region: Atsinanana
- District: Mahanoro District

Population (2019)Census
  - Total: 27,597
- Time zone: UTC3 (EAT)

Ambodibonara is a village and commune in the Mahanoro District, Atsinanana Region, Madagascar.
