= Mahanoro District =

Mahanoro
- District
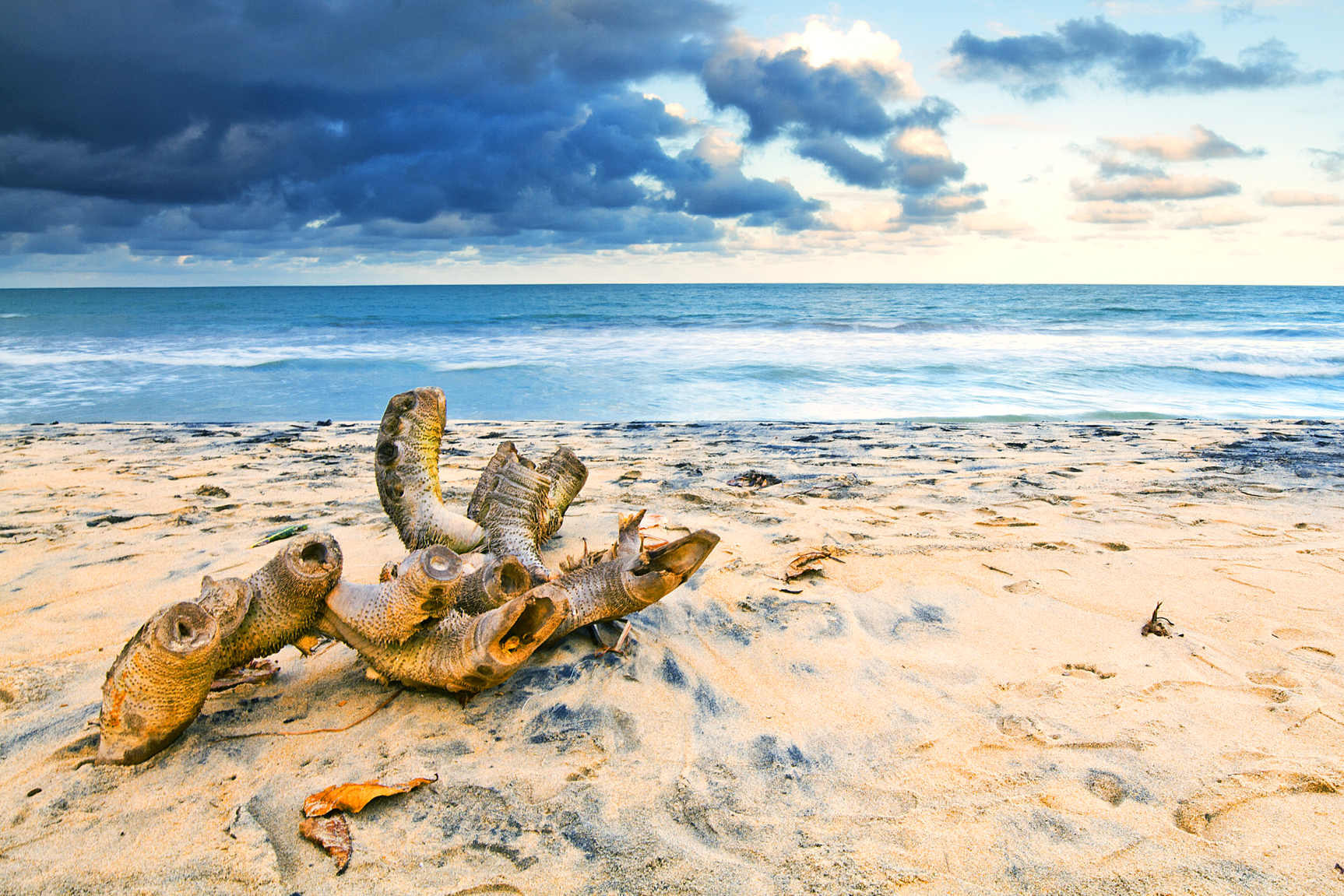
- beach of Mahanoro

- Location in Madagascar
- Coordinates: 19°54′S 48°48′E
- Country: Madagascar
- Region: Atsinanana
- District: Mahanoro District

Area
  - Total: 3,763 km^{2} (1,453 sq mi)

Population (2020)
  - Total: 299,459
- Time zone: UTC3 (EAT)
- Postal code: 510

Mahanoro is a district of Atsinanana in Madagascar. The district has an area of 3,763 km^{2} (1,453 sq mi), and the estimated population in 2020 was 299,459.

== Communes ==
The district is further divided into 11 communes:

- Ambinanidilana
- Ambinanindrano
- Ambodibonara
- Ambodiharina
- Ankazotsifantatra
- Befotaka
- Betsizaraina
- Mahanoro
- Manjakandriana
- Masomeloka
- Tsaravinany

== Rivers ==
- The small Masora River (at Masomeloka)
- The Mangoro River (at Mahanoro).
