= Ambohimanga Sud =

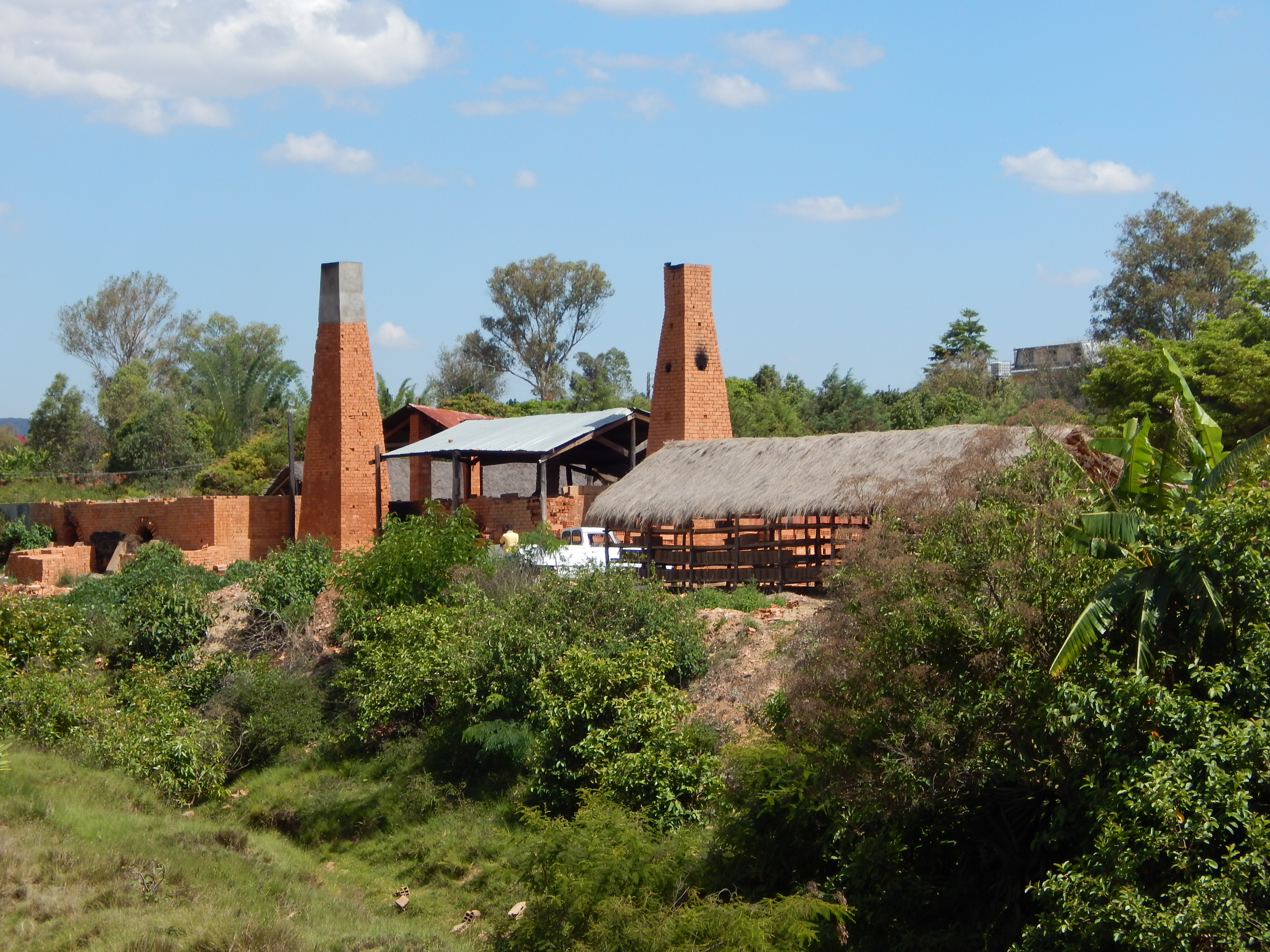
- A brick factory in Ambohimanga Sud

- Location in Madagascar
- Coordinates: 20°52′S 47°36′E
- Country: Madagascar
- Region: Vatovavy
- District: Ifanadiana
- Elevation: 638 m (2,093 ft)

Population (2018)
  - Total: 14,293
- Time zone: UTC3 (EAT)
- Postal code: 312

Ambohimanga Sud (Ambohimanga Atsimo) is a municipality in Madagascar. It belongs to the district of Ifanadiana, which is a part of the region Vatovavy. The population of the commune was 14,293 in 2018.

Primary and junior level secondary education are available in town. The majority 95% of the population of the commune are farmers. The most important crops are rice and beans, while other important agricultural products are coffee and cassava. Services provide employment for 5% of the population.

== Rivers ==
Ambohimanga Sud is situated at the Manandriana river.
