= Befotaka, Atsinanana =

Befotaka
- Location in Madagascar
- Coordinates: 17°05′02″S 48°58′00″E
- Country: Madagascar
- Region: Atsinanana
- District: Mahanoro (district)
- Elevation: 788 m (2,585 ft)

Population (2019)Census
  - Total: 11,666
- Time zone: UTC3 (EAT)

Befotaka is a village and rural commune in the Mahanoro (district) in the Atsinanana Region, Madagascar.
