= Ifanadiana =

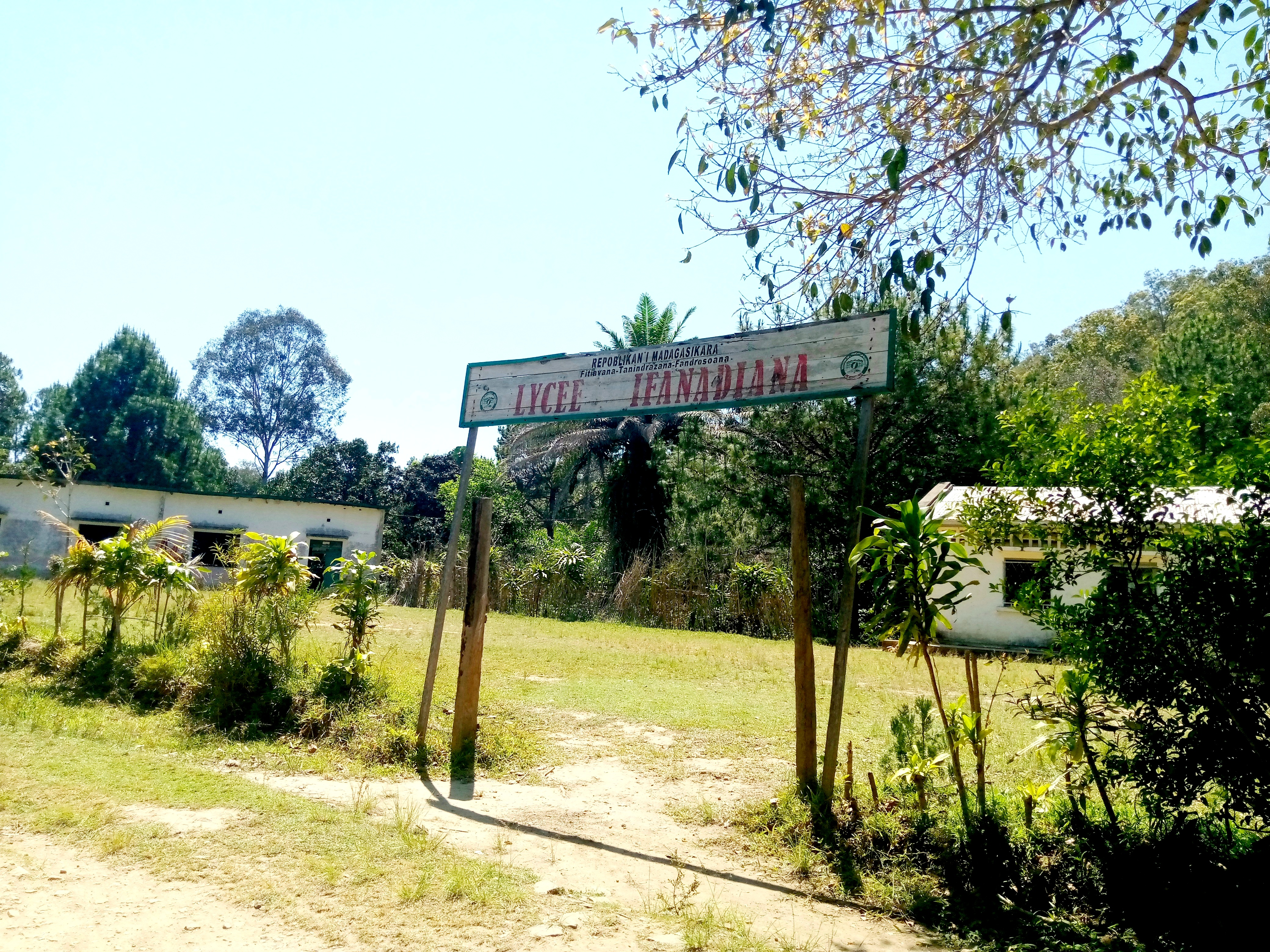
- The Lycee of Ifanadiana

- Location in Madagascar
- Coordinates: 21°18′S 47°38′E
- Country: Madagascar
- Region: Vatovavy
- District: Ifanadiana
- Elevation: 466 m (1,529 ft)

Population (2018)
  - Total: 15,681
- Time zone: UTC3 (EAT)
- postal code: 312

Ifanadiana is a town and commune in Madagascar. It belongs to the district of Ifanadiana, which is a part of the region Vatovavy. The population of the commune was estimated 15,681 in 2018.

In addition to primary schooling the town offers secondary education at both junior and senior levels. The town provides access to hospital services to its citizens. The majority 70% of the population of the commune are farmers. The most important crops are coffee and rice, while other important agricultural products are bananas, beans and cassava. Services provide employment for 30% of the population.

The town of Ifanandiana is situated alongside the National Road 25 that leads from Fianarantsoa to Mananjary.
