= Ifanadiana District =

Ifanadiana
- District
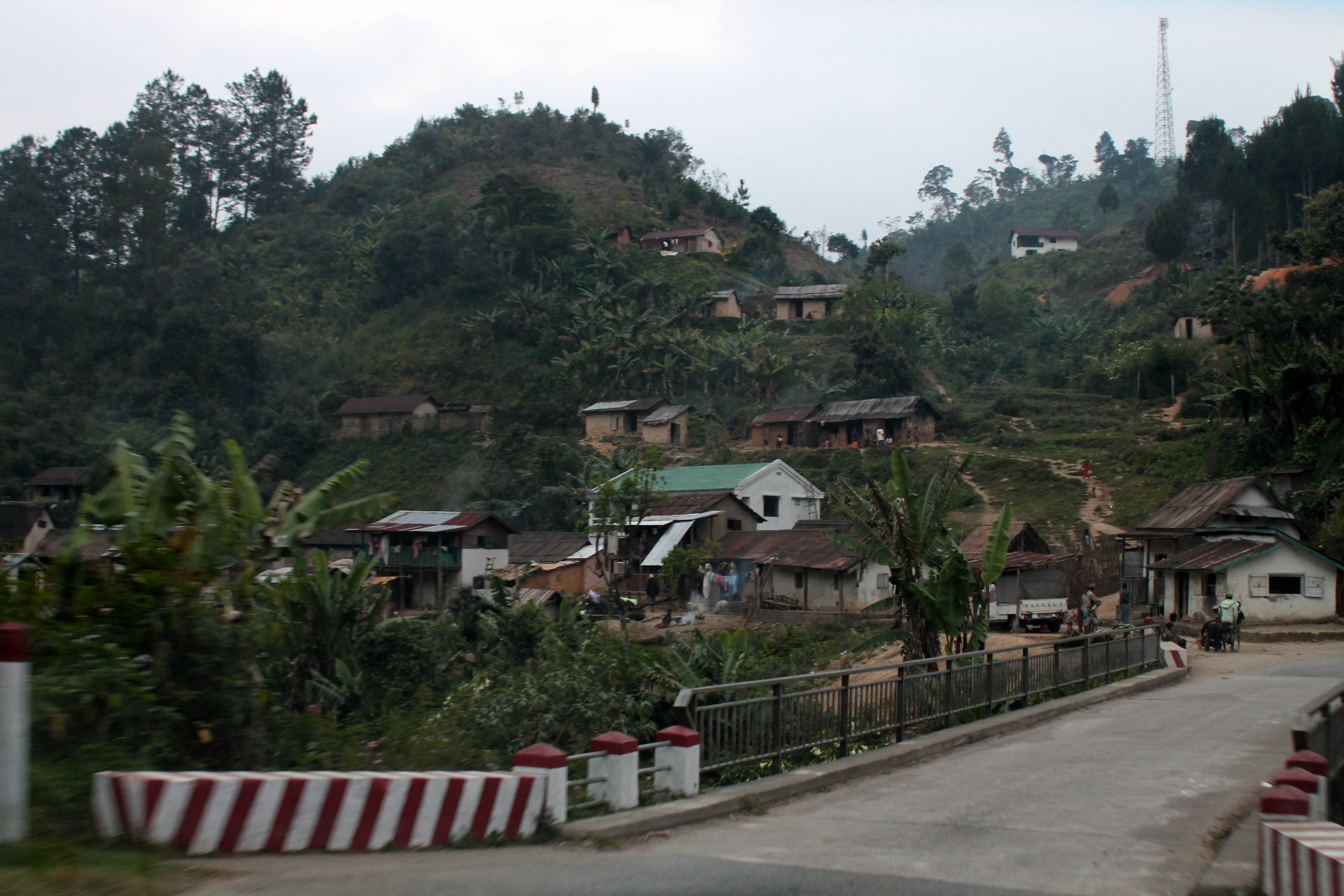
- Ranomafana

- Location within Madagascar
- Coordinates: 21°18′S 47°38′E
- Country: Madagascar
- Region: Vatovavy

Area
  - Total: 3,970 km^{2} (1,530 sq mi)

Population (2020)
  - Total: 183,553
  - Density: 46.2/km^{2} (120/sq mi)
- Postal code: 312

Ifanadiana is a district of Vatovavy in Madagascar. The district has an area of 3,971 km^{2} (1,533 sq mi), and the estimated population in 2020 was 183,553.

== Communes ==
The district is further divided into 14 communes, which is sub-divided into 195 fokontany (villages). The postal code is 312.

- Ambiabe
- Ambohimanga Sud
- Ambohimera
- Analampasina
- Androrangavola
- Antaretra
- Antsindra
- Fasintsara
- Ifanadiana
- Kelilalina
- Maroharatra
- Marotoko
- Ranomafana
- Tsaratanana

== Protected areas ==
- Part of the Ranomafana National Park, one of the most famous national parks of Madagascar.
- Part of the Ambositra-Vondrozo Forest Corridor, a protected harmonious landscape.

== Roads ==
- National road 25
