= Fasintsara =

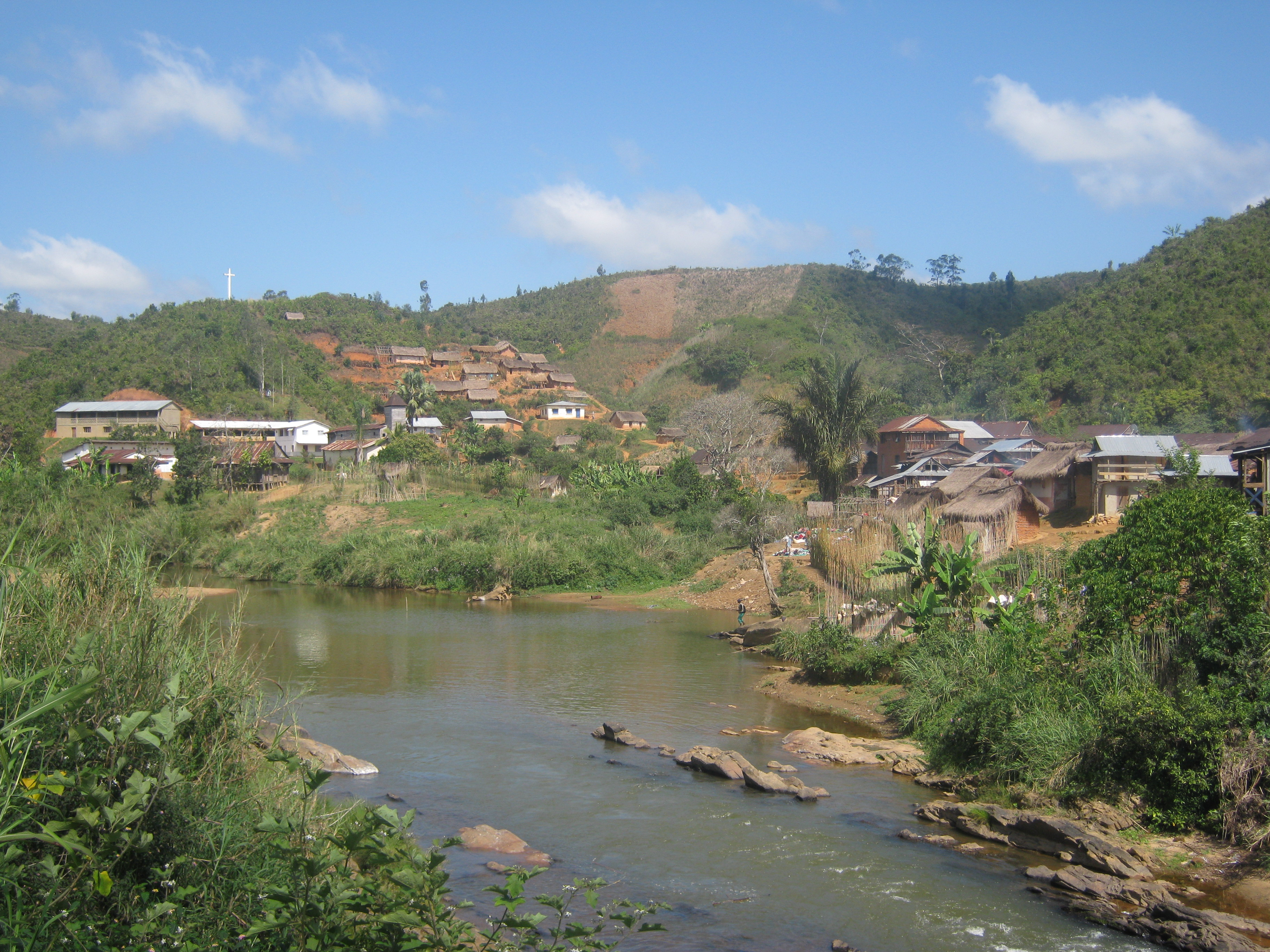
- Fasintsara

- Location in Madagascar
- Coordinates: 20°42′S 47°42′E
- Country: Madagascar
- Province: Fianarantsoa
- Region: Vatovavy
- District: Ifanadiana

Government
  - Mayor: Nicolas Letody
- Elevation: 678 m (2,224 ft)

Population (2018)
  - Total: 10,377
- Time zone: UTC3 (EAT)
- Madagascar: 312

Fasintsara is a town and commune in Madagascar. It belongs to the district of Ifanadiana, which is a part of the region of Vatovavy. The population of the commune was estimated to be approximately 10,377 in 2018.

The villages Ambalapaiso, Ambatomanjaka, Ambinanisery, Ambodihara Nord, Ambodihara Sud, Ambodivoangy, Ambodinihaonana, Ambohitsara, Ampasimbola, Ampasinambo, Andranomaitso, Antenombelona, Befotaka, Fasintsara, Fiadanana Nord, Manakana Sud, Marovoraka, Morarano, Sahakondro, Sakavanana, Tsarakianja, Tsararivotra, Tsaratanana and Volobe belong to this municipality.

The town has a primary and (junior level) secondary education system. Majority (99%) of the population are farmers. The most important crop is rice; other notable products include beans and cassava. Services provide employment for 1% of the population.

== Rivers ==
Fasintsara is situated at the Sakaivo river.
