= Mangoro River =

River in Eastern Madagascar

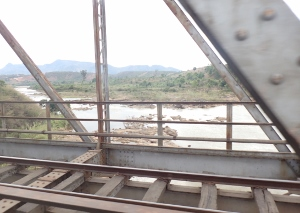
- Mangoro

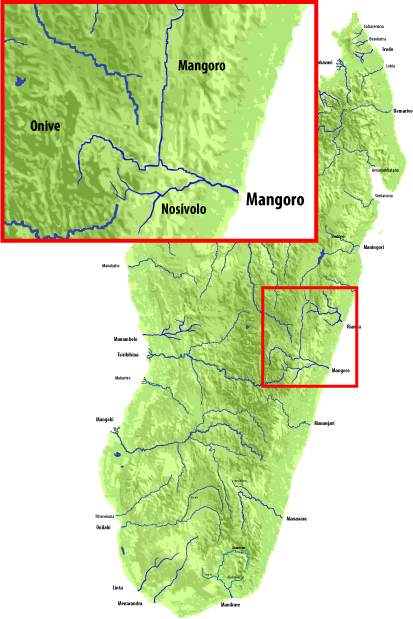
- Mangoro River
- Native name: Mangoro (Malagasy)

Location
- Country: Madagascar

Physical characteristics
- Source
  - location: 14 km from Mandialaza, NE of Anjozorobe
  - elevation: 1,100 m (3,600 ft)
- Mouth
  - location: Ambodiharina, Indian Ocean
  - coordinates: 20°0′17.8848″S 48°46′54.0192″E
  - elevation: 0 m (0 ft)
- Length: 300 km (190 mi)
- Basin size: 17,175 km^{2} (6,631 sq mi)
- Discharge
  - location: Near mouth
  - average: (Period: 1971–2000)386.3 m^{3}/s (13,640 cu ft/s)

Basin features
- River system: Mangoro River
- Tributaries
  - right: Onive, Nosivolo

bassin of the Mangoro

The Mangoro River is the largest river on the east coast of Madagascar by basin size and water volume, and is 300 km in length.

== Overview ==
The Mangoro begins northeast of the town of Anjozorobe in the Analamanga region, at approximately 1,100 meters. Its primary tributaries are the Onive River (which joins on the right bank at 200 km from the river source) and Nosivolo River. Its mouth is at the Indian Ocean near the town of Ambodiharina.

Owing to its many tributaries, the Mangoro maintains a high flow year round, making it an ideal river for rafting.

As of 2012, the Sherritt International Corporation planned to use the Mangoro River as a source of water for a slurry pipeline carrying ore for the Ambatovy project mines, raising environmental concerns.

== Wildlife ==
There are small populations of crocodiles in the more placid sections of the river, but their population is minimal and continues to plummet.

Rivers of Madagascar
