= Railway stations in Madagascar =

List of Railway stations in Madagascar include:

== Cities served by rail ==
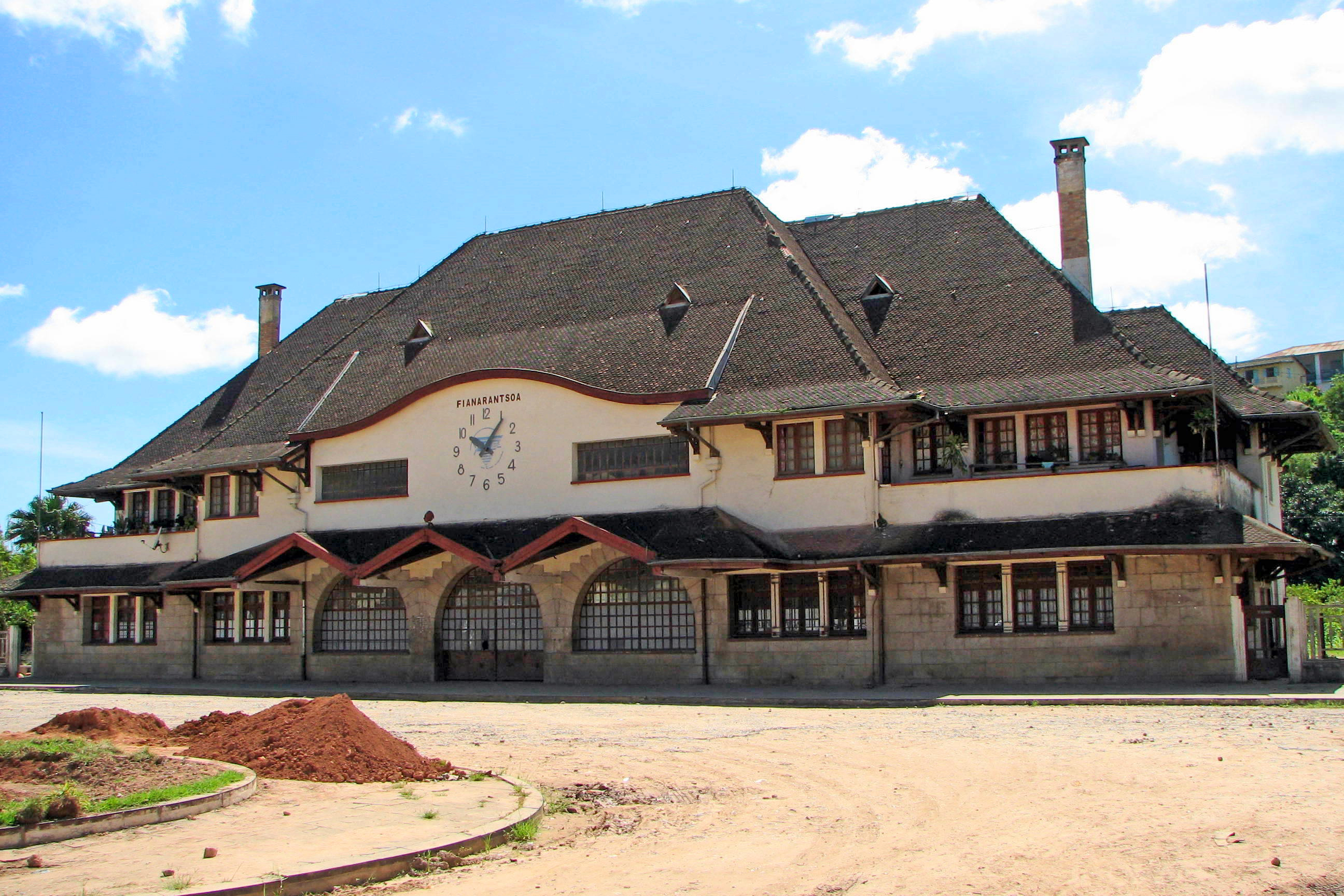
Fianarantsoa train station

(northern line) operated by Madarail.

=== Train DIA SOA: Passenger services between Moramanga – Toamasina (TCE) ===
Duration: 10h30. Freight services also to Antananarivo and Antsirabe.

- Toamasina - chief seaport
- Ampasimanolotra
- Ambila-Lemaitso
- Anivorano Est
- Fanasana
- Razanaka
- Lohariandava
- Andekaleka
- Andasibe
- Moramanga - junction
- Manjakandriana
- Antananarivo - national capital
- Antsirabe - The railway line goes 12 kilometer further south.

Note: Between Moramanga and Antsirabe there is no passenger service anymore. Passenger traffic will be reopened in December 2023.

=== Train DIA SOA: Passenger services between Moramanga – Ambatondrazaka (TCE) ===
Duration: 6h.

- Moramanga
- Morarano Gare
- Ambatondrazaka

Note: stops also in Amboasary Gara, Andaingo, Andilanatoby, Vohidiala and Manakambahiny Andrefana.

=== Fianarantsoa Côte-Est railway (FCE) ===
Also known as the Southern line

- Manakara - port - PK 163.270 – 4 meters
- Ambila - PK 146.267 – 12 meters
- Mizilo Gara - PK 136.850 – 26 meters
- Antsaka - PK 128.200 – 39 meters
- Sahasinaka - PK 118.300 – 39 meters
- Fenomby - PK 106.650 – 190 meters
- Mahabako - PK 99.000 – 195 meters
- Ionilahy - PK 82.700 – 211 meters
- Manampatrana or Ambinany-Manampatrana - PK 78.800 – 206 meters
- Amboanjobe - PK 71.680 – 356 meters
- Tolongoina - PK 61.900 – 390 meters
- Madiorano - PK 54.225 – 609 meters
- Andrambovato - PK 45.278 – 878 meters
- Ranomena - PK 38.520 – 1061 meters
- Ampitambe - PK 28.540 – 1064 meters
- Sahambavy - PK 21.440 – 1079 meters
- Vohimasina - PK 9.510 – 1018 meters
- Fianarantsoa - PK 0 – 1100 meters

== See also ==
- Transport in Madagascar
