= Mitanty =

- Interactive map of Mitanty
- Coordinates: 21°44′S 48°00′E
- Country: Madagascar
- Region: Fitovinany
- District: Manakara Atsimo
- Elevation: 14 m (46 ft)

Population (2001)
  - Total: 9,000
- Time zone: UTC3 (EAT)
- Postal code: 316

Mitanty is a rural municipality in Madagascar. It belongs to the district of Manakara Atsimo, which is a part of the region of Fitovinany. The population of the municipality was estimated to be approximately 9,000 in 2001 commune census.

Primary and junior level secondary education are available in town. The majority 98% of the population of the commune are farmers. The most important crop is rice, while other important products are coffee, cloves, oranges and cassava. Services provide employment for 2% of the population.

== Geography ==
This municipality is situated at 68 km from Manakara and 8km from the National road 12 at Analavory. It lies at the Faraony River.
