= Marofarihy =

- Location in Madagascar
- Coordinates: 22°2′S 48°0′E
- Country: Madagascar
- Region: Fitovinany
- District: Manakara

Area
  - Total: 75 km^{2} (29 sq mi)
- Elevation: 4 m (13 ft)

Population (2001)
  - Total: 7,000
- Time zone: UTC3 (EAT)
- Postal code: 316

Marofarihy is a rural municipality in Madagascar. It belongs to the district of Mankara-Atsimo, which is a part of Fitovinany. The population of the commune was estimated to be approximately 7,000 in 2001 commune census.

== Geography ==
The municipality is situated at 15 km North of Manakara. It is crossed by the National Road 12 and the Fianarantsoa-Côte Est railway.

5 Fokontany (villages) belong to this municipality: Marofarihy, Ambotaka, Mideboka, Alakamisy Anivosoa and Ambohimandroso.

Only primary schooling is available. Farming and raising livestock provides employment for 46.5% and 46.5% of the working population. The most important crop is rice, while other important products are coffee, sugarcane and lychee. Industry and services provide employment for 3% and 4% of the population, respectively.

== Rivers ==
- The Managnano river.
