= Vohimasina Sud =

Vohimasina Sud Vohimasina Atsimo
- Location in Madagascar
- Coordinates: 21°51′S 48°3′E
- Country: Madagascar
- Region: Fitovinany
- District: Manakara
- Elevation: 11 m (36 ft)

Population (2001)
  - Total: 15,000
- Time zone: UTC3 (EAT)
- Postal code: 316

Vohimasina Sud is a rural municipality in Madagascar. It belongs to the district of Manakara, which is a part of the region of Fitovinany. The population of the municipality was estimated to be approximately 15,000 in the 2001 commune census.

Only primary schooling is available. 93% of the population of the commune are farmers. The most important crops are soya and cloves, while other important agricultural products are coffee and sweet potatoes. Additionally, fishing employs 7% of the population.

== Cyclones ==
In 2022 the village was hit by the Cyclone Emnati.

== Roads ==
This municipality is linked by an unpaved provincial road to Analavory and the National road 12.

== Rivers ==
Vohimasina Sud lies at the southern banks of the Faraony River. On the northern side is situated Vohimasina Nord.
