= Vohimasina Nord =

Vohimasina Nord Vohimasina Avaratra
- Location in Madagascar
- Coordinates: 21°44′S 48°8′E
- Country: Madagascar
- Region: Fitovinany
- District: Manakara Atsimo
- Elevation: 19 m (62 ft)

Population (2001)
  - Total: 22,000
- Time zone: UTC3 (EAT)
- Postal code: 316

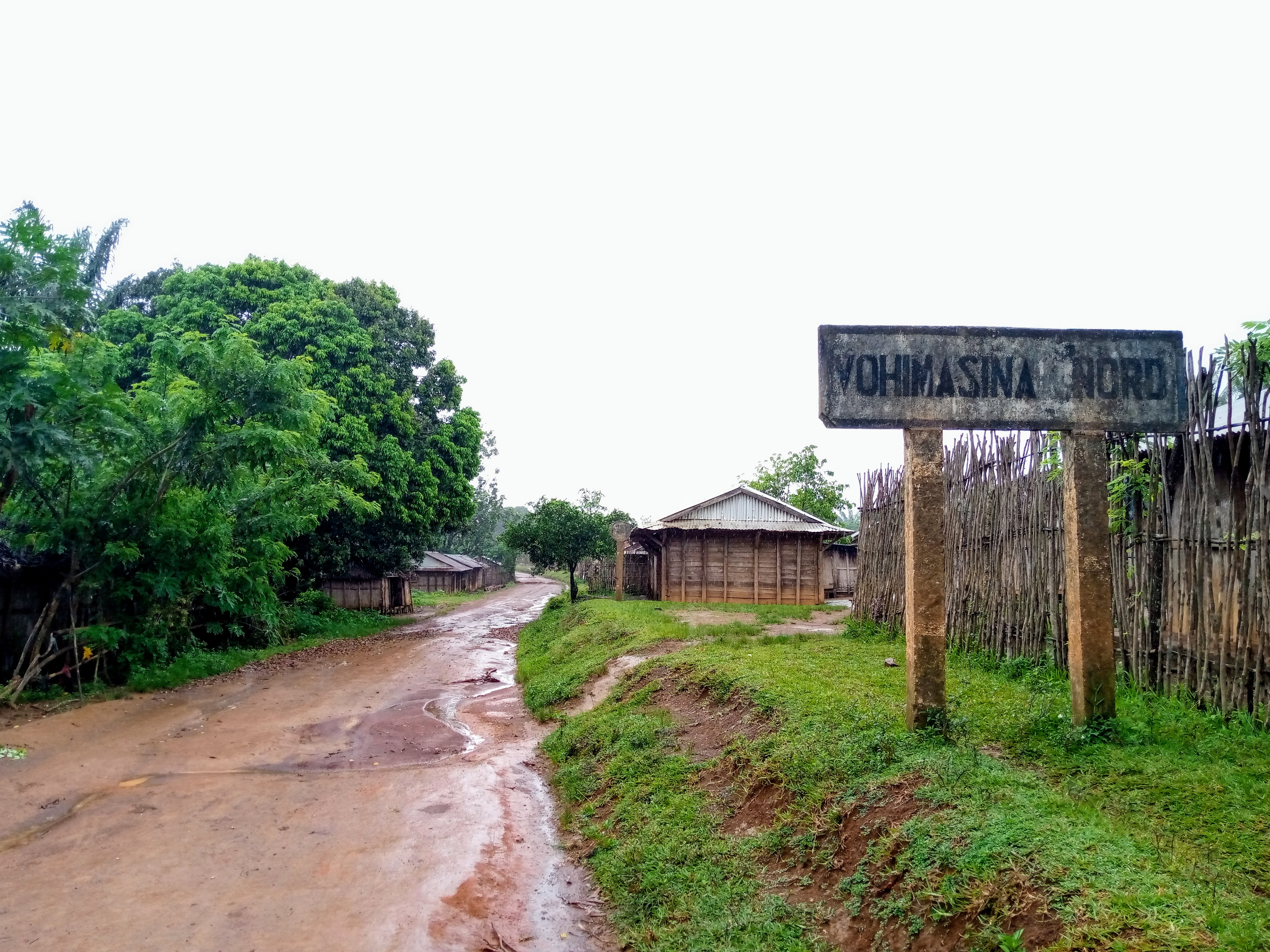
Entrance to Vohimasina Nord

Vohimasina Nord is a town and commune in Madagascar. It belongs to the district of the district of Manakara Atsimo, which is a part of the region of Fitovinany. The population of the commune was estimated to be approximately 22,000 in 2001 commune census.

Primary and junior level secondary education are available in town. The majority 90.3% of the population of the commune are farmers. The most important crop is cloves, while other important products are oranges, cassava and rice. Industry and services provide employment for 1.5% and 2.2% of the population, respectively. Additionally fishing employs 6% of the population.

== Roads ==
This municipality is linked by an unpaved provincial road to Analavory and the National road 12.

== Rivers ==
Vohimasina Nord lies on the northern banks of the Faraony River. On the southern banks is situated its sister town of Vohimasina Sud.
