= Ambila =

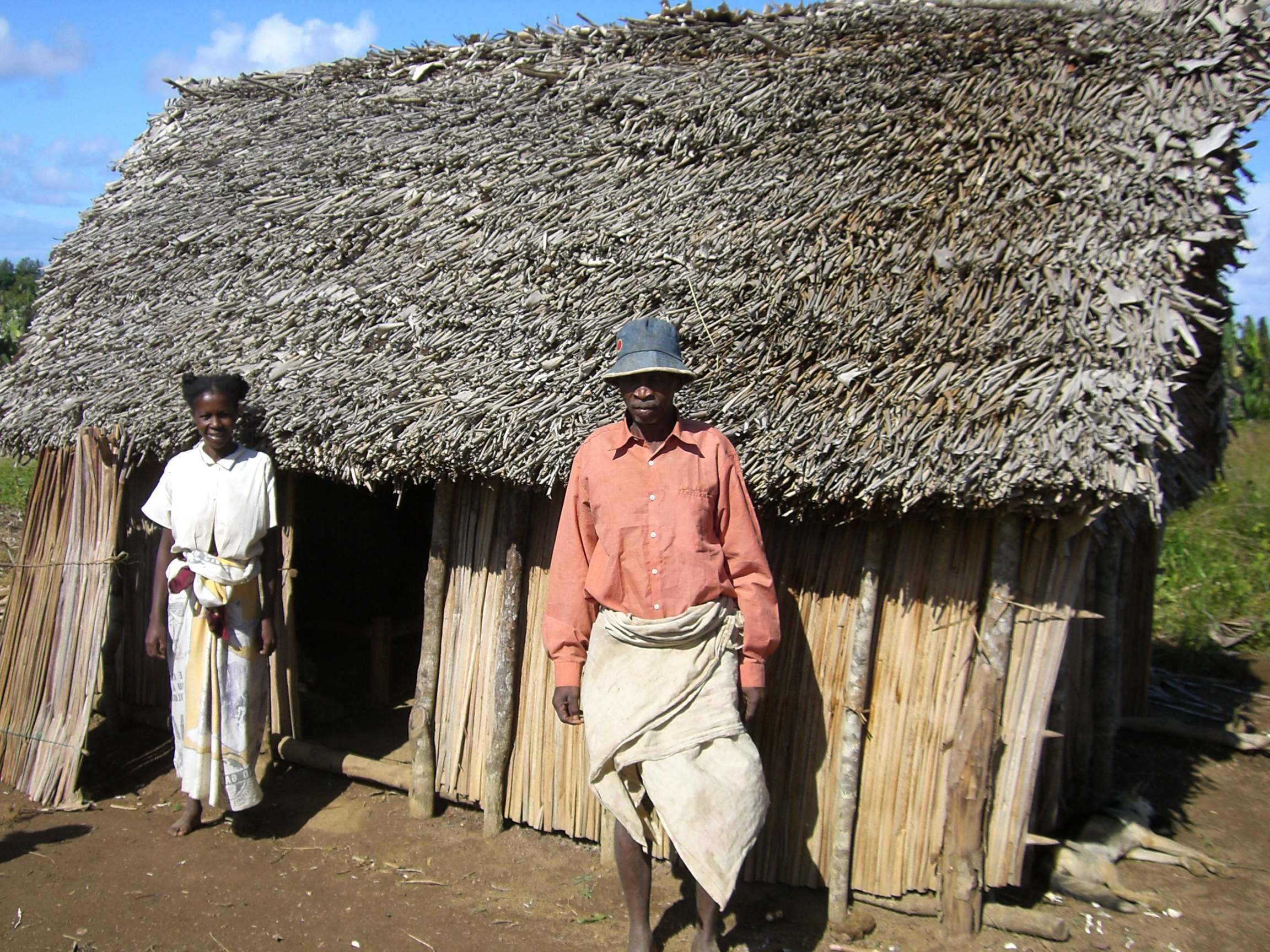
- a house in Loharano, a fokontany of Ambila

- Location in Madagascar
- Coordinates: 21°59′S 47°57′E
- Country: Madagascar
- Region: Fitovinany
- District: Manakara
- Elevation: 13 m (43 ft)

Population (2001)
  - Total: 17,000
- Time zone: UTC3 (EAT)
- Postal code: 316
- Climate: Af

Ambila is a rural municipality in Madagascar. It belongs to the district of Manakara, which is a part of Fitovinany. The population of the commune was estimated to be approximately 17,000 in 2001 commune census.

Only primary schooling is available. Farming and raising livestock provides employment for 40% and 37% of the working population. The most important crop is rice, while other important products are lychee and cassava. Services provide employment for 3% of the population. Additionally, fishing employs 20% of the population.

== Geography ==
It lies at the Fianarantsoa-Côte Est railway and the RN 12 that link the town with Fianarantsoa and Manakara.
