= Ambahatrazo =

- Location in Madagascar
- Coordinates: 21°52′S 47°57′E
- Country: Madagascar
- Region: Fitovinany
- District: Manakara Atsimo
- Elevation: 29 m (95 ft)

Population (2001)
  - Total: 10,000
- Time zone: UTC3 (EAT)
- Postal code: 316

Ambahatrazo is a town and commune in Madagascar. It belongs to the district of Manakara Atsimo, which is a part of Vatovavy-Fitovinany Region. The population of the commune was estimated to be approximately 10,000 in 2001 commune census.

Only primary schooling is available. The vast majority (90%) of the population of the commune are farmers, while an additional 5% make their livelihood by raising livestock. The most important crop is rice, while other important products are lychee and cassava. The remaining 5% of the population are employed in service industries.
