= List of contemporary pieces for solo accordion =

List of solo accordion pieces

This is a non exhaustive compilation of contemporary pieces for solo accordion, including electroacoustic pieces. See also the entries on accordion. For other genres see List of music styles that incorporate the accordion.

Ordering is by surname of composer.

== A ==
- Svend Aaquist
  - Saga Night
- Samuel Adler
  - Canto XVIII (2009)

== B ==
- Luciano Berio
  - Sequenza XIII, per accordion solo (1995)
- Robert Baksa
  - Accordion Sonata (1998)
- Arne Nilsson Björk
  - Fantasia - Domine Fili Unigenite (2024)
- Robert Russell Bennett
  - Four Nocturnes (1960)

== C ==
- Henry Cowell
  - Iridescent Rondo (1960)

== D ==
- David Diamond
  - Sonatina (1966)

== F ==
- Jindřich Feld
  - Konzertstück für Akkordeon
  - Suite für Akkordeon
- Lukas Foss
  - Curriculum Vitae (1978)

== G ==
- Jürgen Ganzer
  - Phantasie 84
- Sofia Gubaidulina
  - De Profundis
  - Et Exspecto (1985)
- George Katehis
  - Become / Desiccated (2017)
- Guy Klucevsek
  - Three Tributes (2016)

== H ==
- Toshio Hosokawa
  - Melodia
  - Melodia II
  - Slow Motion (2002)

== I ==
- Maki Ishii
  - Lost Sounds II, Op. 33b
  - Tango-Prism, Op. 73

== K ==
- Veli Kujala
  - La storia dello squalo della mia vita (2017)

== L ==
- Eric Lindh
  - Skärgårdsoförståelse (2024)
- William Lindvall
  - Earthmover (2024)
  - Fiska i Finland (Fishing in Finland) (2017)
- Normand Lockwood
  - Sonata-Fantasia (1965)
- Torbjörn Iwan Lundquist
  - Allerlei (1968)
  - Assoziationen (1981)
  - Botany Play (1968)
  - Composers masquerade
  - Lappri (1972)
  - Metamorphoses (1965)
  - Microscope : 21 pieces for accordeon solo (1971)
  - Nine two-part inventions (Neun zweistimmige Inventionen) (1966)
  - Partita piccola (1963)
  - Plasticity (Plastische Varianten) (1967)
  - Sonatina Piccola (1967)

== M ==
- Petri Makkonen
  - Disco Toccata
  - A Flight Beyond Time
  - Like Swans
- Aina Myrstener
  - Meditation : for accordion and electronics (2024)

== N ==
- Joseph Natoli
  - Sonata in F Major (2018)
- Arne Nordheim
  - Flashing
- Per Nørgård
  - Anatomisk safari (Anatomic Safari) (1967)

== O ==
- Pauline Oliveros
  - Shape Shifting (1965)
- Krzysztof Olczak
  - Berceuse
  - Phantasmagorien

== P ==
- Paul Pisk
  - Salute to Juan (1961)

== S ==
- William Schimmel
  - Fables (1975)
  - Remembering a Legend; Charles Magnante (1987)
  - The Spring Street Ritual (1979)
  - Variations in Search of a Theme (1976)
- Elie Siegmeister
  - Improvisation, Ballad and Dance (1962)
- William Grant Still
  - Aria (1960)
  - Lilt (1967)
- Andreas Sporrong (FKA Andreas Nilsson)

== T ==
- Alexander Tcherepnin
  - Invention (1968)
  - Partita (1962)
- Timothy Thompson
  - Growth Cells (1976)
  - Keyworld (1977)
  - Rossiniland (1977)

== V ==
- Viktor Vlasov
  - Gulag

== Z ==
- John Zorn
  - Road Runner

== See also ==
- Accordion
- List of music styles that incorporate the accordion
