= Manakara-Atsimo District =

Manakara-Atsimo Manakara Sud
- District
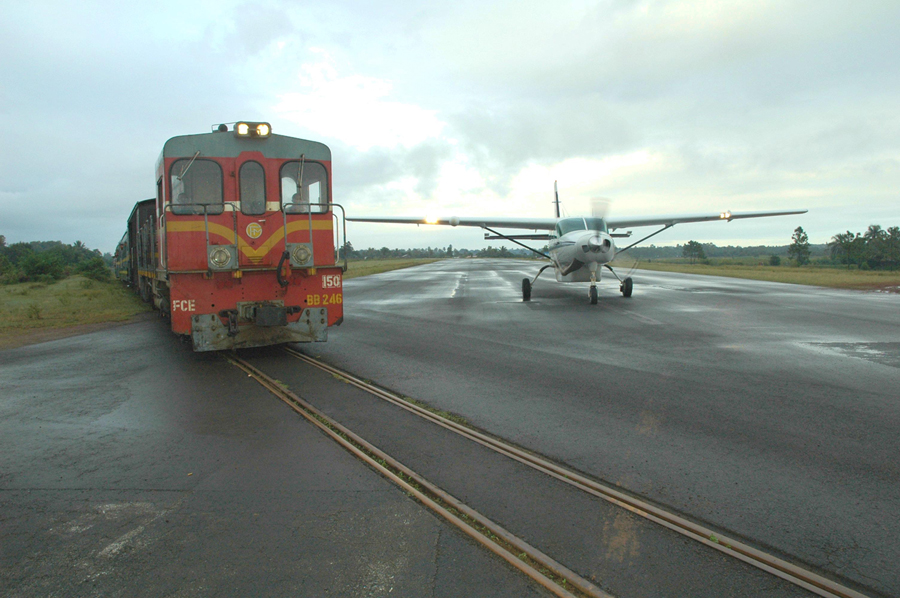
- The railroad from Fianarantsoa

- Location within Madagascar
- Coordinates: 22°09′0″S 48°00′0″E
- Country: Madagascar
- Region: Fitovinany

Government
  - Prefect: Béatrice Rahantamalala
- Elevation: 12 m (39 ft)

Population (2018)
  - Total: 254,344
- postal code: 316

Manakara-Atsimo is a district of Fitovinany in Madagascar. The main city is Manakara.

== Communes ==
The district is further divided into 42 communes:

- Ambahatrazo
- Ambahive
- Ambalaroka
- Ambalavero
- Ambila
- Amboanjo
- Ambohitsara M
- Amborondra
- Ambotaka
- Ampasimanjeva
- Ampasimboraka
- Ampasipotsy
- Analavory
- Anorombato
- Anosiala
- Anteza
- Bekatra
- Fenomby
- Lokomby
- Mahabako
- Mahamaibe
- Manakara
- Mangatsiotra
- Marofarihy
- Mavorano
- Mitanty
- Mizilo Gara
- Nihaonana
- Onilahy
- Sahanambohitra
- Saharefo
- Sahasinaka
- Sakoana
- Sorombo
- Tataho
- Vatana
- Vinanitelo
- Vohilava
- Vohimanitra
- Vohimasina Nord
- Vohimasina Sud
- Vohimasy

== Rivers ==
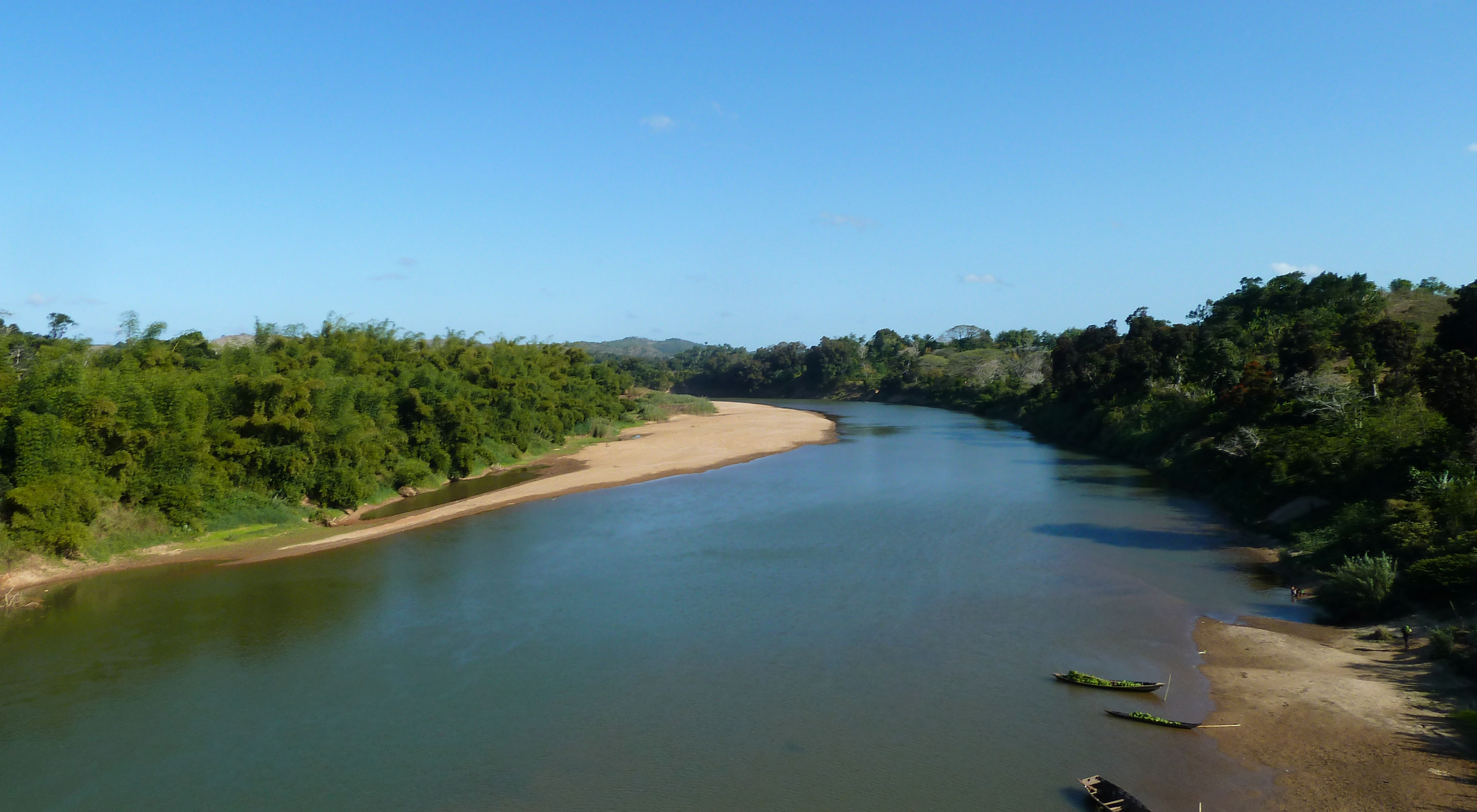
Faraony from RN 12

- the Manakara River
- the Faraony River

== Infrastructure ==
The district is crossed by the National Road 12, as well as the Fianarantsoa-Côte Est railway.
