= Fenomby =

- Location in Madagascar
- Coordinates: 21°46′S 47°47′E
- Country: Madagascar
- Region: Fitovinany
- District: Manakara
- Elevation: 172 m (564 ft)

Population (2018)census
  - Total: 8,268
- Time zone: UTC3 (EAT)
- Postal code: 316

Fenomby is a rural municipality in Madagascar. It belongs to the district of Manakara, which is a part of Fitovinany. This municipality had 8,268 inhabitants in 2018.

Primary and junior level secondary education are available in town. The majority 99.5% of the population of the commune are farmers. The most important crops are coffee and rice, while other important agricultural products are lychee and cassava. Services provide employment for 0.5% of the population.

== Geography ==
It lies at the Fianarantsoa-Côte Est railway that links the town with Fianarantsoa and Manakara. The Faraony River has its mouth to the Indian Ocean in the municipality.
