= Ampasipotsy, Manakara =

Ampasipotsy
- Location in Madagascar
- Coordinates: 21°57′S 47°44′E
- Country: Madagascar
- Region: Vatovavy-Fitovinany
- District: Manakara
- Elevation: 176 m (577 ft)

Population (2001)
  - Total: 6,000
- Time zone: UTC3 (EAT)

Ampasipotsy is a town and commune in Madagascar. It belongs to the district of Manakara, which is a part of Vatovavy-Fitovinany Region. The population of the commune was estimated to be approximately 6,000 in 2001 commune census.

Only primary schooling is available. The majority 99.9% of the population of the commune are farmers. The most important crops are coffee and rice; also cassava is an important agricultural product. Services provide employment for 0.1% of the population.
