= Vohimanitra =

- Location in Madagascar
- Coordinates: 21°42′S 47°42′E
- Country: Madagascar
- Region: Vatovavy-Fitovinany
- District: Manakara
- Elevation: 219 m (719 ft)

Population (2001)
  - Total: 6,000
- Time zone: UTC3 (EAT)

Vohimanitra is a town and commune in Madagascar. It belongs to the district of Manakara, which is a part of Vatovavy-Fitovinany Region. The population of the commune was estimated to be approximately 6,000 in 2001 commune census.

Only primary schooling is available. Farming and raising livestock provides employment for 47.5% and 47.5% of the working population. The most important crops are coffee and rice, while other important agricultural products are sugarcane and cassava. Services provide employment for 5% of the population.

== Geography ==
It lies at the Faraony River.
