= Ambohitsara M =

- Location in Madagascar
- Coordinates: 21°51′S 47°49′E
- Country: Madagascar
- Region: Fitovinany
- District: Manakara
- Elevation: 100 m (330 ft)

Population (2001)
  - Total: 7,000
- Time zone: UTC3 (EAT)

Ambohitsara M is a municipality in Madagascar. It belongs to the district of Manakara, which is a part of Fitovinany. The population of the municipality was estimated to be approximately 7,000 in 2001 commune census.

Only primary schooling is available. The majority 98.8% of the population of the commune are farmers. The most important crop is rice, while other important products are bananas, coffee and cassava. Industry and services provide employment for 1% and 0.2% of the population, respectively.
