= Mangatsiotra =

- Location in Madagascar
- Coordinates: 22°17′S 47°57′E
- Country: Madagascar
- Region: Fitovinany
- District: Manakara
- Elevation: 10 m (33 ft)

Population (2001)
  - Total: 4,000
- Time zone: UTC3 (EAT)
- Postal code: 316

Mangatsiotra is a rural municipality in Madagascar. It belongs to the district of Manakara, which is a part of Fitovinany. The population of the commune was estimated to be approximately 4,000 in 2001 commune census.

Only primary schooling is available. The majority 65% of the population of the commune are farmers, while an additional 2.5% receives their livelihood from raising livestock. The most important crop is lychee, while other important products are coffee, cloves and mango. Industry and services provide employment for 10% and 2.5% of the population, respectively. Additionally fishing employs 20% of the population.
