= Vatana, Madagascar =

Vatana
- Location in Madagascar
- Coordinates: 22°13′S 47°45′E
- Country: Madagascar
- Region: Fitovinany
- District: Manakara-Atsimo
- Elevation: 24 m (79 ft)

Population (2001)
  - Total: 10,000
- Time zone: UTC3 (EAT)

Vatana is a town and commune in the region of Fitovinany in Madagascar. It belongs to the district of Manakara-Atsimo. The population of the commune was estimated to be approximately 10,000 in the 2001 commune census.

Only primary schooling is available. The town provides access to hospital services to its citizens. The majority 99.5% of the population of the commune are farmers. The most important crops are coffee and rice; also cassava is an important agricultural product. Services provide employment for 0.5% of the population.
