= Batrelaky =

Music style

- Cultural origins: Southeastern part of Madagascar especially Atsimo Atsinanana and Fitovinany
- Typical instruments: Vocal, Guitar, Bass, accordion, Drum kit

External audio
- "TINAH - Ela loatry" (Example of Batrelaky)

Batrelaky is a music style from southeastearn part of Madagascar especially between Manakara and Farafangana. This musical genre is mainly played with an accordion, guitar, bass and drums. It is a mostly traditional Malagasy genre.

In gatherings to celebrate it, the multi-ethnic crowds don Firake (for the women) and salaka (for the men).

== Famous Artists ==
- Bakidy Gegette
- Pierrot Matatana
- Dat'kotry
- Lôla
- Tata Rahely
- Tinah
- Willy
- Soudarà
