= Mahamaibe =

- Location in Madagascar
- Coordinates: 21°45′S 47°53′E
- Country: Madagascar
- Region: Vatovavy-Fitovinany
- District: Manakara
- Elevation: 29 m (95 ft)

Population (2001)
  - Total: 9,000
- Time zone: UTC3 (EAT)

Mahamaibe is a town and commune in Madagascar. It belongs to the district of Manakara, which is a part of Vatovavy-Fitovinany Region. The population of the commune was estimated to be approximately 9000 in 2001 commune census.

Only primary schooling is available. The majority 99% of the population of the commune are farmers. The most important crops are coffee and rice, while other important agricultural products are bananas and cassava. Services provide employment for 1% of the population.
