= Bekatra =

- Location in Madagascar
- Coordinates: 22°6′S 47°43′E
- Country: Madagascar
- Region: Vatovavy-Fitovinany
- District: Manakara
- Elevation: 40 m (130 ft)

Population (2001)
  - Total: 20,000
- Time zone: UTC3 (EAT)

Bekatra is a town and commune in Madagascar. It belongs to the district of Manakara, which is a part of Vatovavy-Fitovinany Region. The population of the commune was estimated to be approximately 20,000 in 2001 commune census.

Primary and junior level secondary education are available in town. The majority 97% of the population of the commune are farmers, while an additional 1% receives their livelihood from raising livestock. The most important crops are coffee and rice, while other important agricultural products are bananas and cassava. Services provide employment for 2% of the population.
