= Ambahive =

- Location in Madagascar
- Coordinates: 22°12′S 47°43′E
- Country: Madagascar
- Region: Vatovavy-Fitovinany
- District: Manakara
- Elevation: 17 m (56 ft)

Population (2001)
  - Total: 15,000
- Time zone: UTC3 (EAT)

Ambahive is a town and commune in Madagascar. It belongs to the district of Manakara, which is a part of Vatovavy-Fitovinany Region. The population of the commune was estimated to be approximately 15,000 in 2001 commune census.

Primary and junior level secondary education is available in the town. The majority 99.8% of the population of the commune are farmers. The most important crop is coffee, while other important products are cassava and rice. Services provide employment for 0.2% of the population.
