= Sahanambohitra =

- Location in Madagascar
- Coordinates: 21°52′S 47°48′E
- Country: Madagascar
- Region: Vatovavy-Fitovinany
- District: Manakara
- Elevation: 134 m (440 ft)

Population (2001)
  - Total: 5,000
- Time zone: UTC3 (EAT)

Sahanambohitra is a town and commune in Madagascar. It belongs to the district of Manakara, which is a part of Vatovavy-Fitovinany Region. The population of the commune was estimated to be approximately 5,000 in 2001 commune census.

Only primary schooling is available. The majority 99% of the population of the commune are farmers. The most important crop is rice, while other important products are coffee and cassava. Services provide employment for 1% of the population.
