= Bezora, Madagascar =

Bezora
- Hamlet
- Map showing location of Bezora
- Coordinates: 21°52′00.0″S 47°48′00.0″E
- Country: Madagascar
- Province: Fianarantsoa

Area
  - Land: 0.2 km^{2} (0.077 sq mi)
- Elevation: 109 m (358 ft)

Bezora is a hamlet in Fianarantsoa Province, Madagascar; the nearest settlement is Sahasinaka. It consists of a road junction, a settlement in the fork of the junction, forest, and fields.
