= Lokomby =

- Location in Madagascar
- Coordinates: 22°11′S 47°45′E
- Country: Madagascar
- Region: Fitovinany
- District: Manakara
- Elevation: 23 m (75 ft)

Population (2001)
  - Total: 15,000
- Time zone: UTC3 (EAT)
- Postal code: 316

Lokomby is a town and commune in Madagascar. It belongs to the district of Manakara, which is a part of Fitovinany. The population of the commune was estimated to be approximately 15,000 in 2001 commune census.

Primary and junior level secondary education are available in town. The majority 95% of the population of the commune are farmers. The most important crops are coffee and rice, while other important agricultural products are cloves, lychee and cassava. Services provide employment for 5% of the population.
