= Nihaonana =

- Interactive map of Nihaonana
- Coordinates: 21°46′16″S 47°53′28″E
- Country: Madagascar
- Region: Vatovavy-Fitovinany
- District: Manakara

Population (2001)
  - Total: 4,000
- Time zone: UTC3 (EAT)

Nihaonana is a town and commune in Madagascar. It belongs to the district of Manakara-Atsimo, which is a part of Vatovavy-Fitovinany Region. The population of the commune was estimated to be approximately 4,000 in 2001 commune census.

Only primary schooling is available. The majority 99.5% of the population of the commune are farmers. The most important crop is rice, while other important products are coffee, cloves, oranges and cassava. Services provide employment for 0.5% of the population.
