= Ambotaka =

- Location in Madagascar
- Coordinates: 21°45′S 48°3′E
- Country: Madagascar
- Region: Vatovavy-Fitovinany
- District: Manakara-Atsimo
- Elevation: 9 m (30 ft)

Population (2001)
  - Total: 11,000
- Time zone: UTC3 (EAT)

Ambotaka is a town and commune in Madagascar. It belongs to the district of Manakara, which is a part of Vatovavy-Fitovinany Region. The population of the commune was estimated to be approximately 11,000 in 2001 commune census.

Only primary schooling is available. The majority 99.5% of the population of the commune are farmers. The most important crops are coffee and cloves, while other important agricultural products are sugarcane, cassava and rice. Additionally fishing employs 0.5% of the population.
