= Mizilo Gara =

- Location in Madagascar
- Coordinates: 22°0′S 47°57′E
- Country: Madagascar
- Region: Vatovavy-Fitovinany
- District: Manakara
- Elevation: 12 m (39 ft)

Population (2001)
  - Total: 8,000
- Time zone: UTC3 (EAT)

Mizilo Gara is a town and commune in Madagascar. It belongs to the district of Manakara, which is a part of Vatovavy-Fitovinany Region. The population of the commune was estimated to be approximately 8,000 in 2001 commune census.

Only primary schooling is available. The majority 94% of the population of the commune are farmers. The most important crops are cassava and lychee, while other important agricultural products are sugarcane and rice. Industry and services provide employment for 5% and 1% of the population, respectively.

It lies at the Fianarantsoa-Côte Est railway and the RN 12 that links the town with Fianarantsoa and Manakara
