= Onilahy =

Onilahy Ionilahy
- Interactive map of Onilahy
- Coordinates: 21°43′S 47°38′E
- Country: Madagascar
- Region: Fitovinany
- District: Manakara
- Elevation: 211 m (692 ft)

Population (2001)
  - Total: 5,000
- Time zone: UTC3 (EAT)
- Postal code: 316

Onilahy (or Ionilahy) is a rural municipality in Madagascar. It belongs to the Manakara-Atsimo District, which is a part of Fitovinany. The population of the commune was estimated to be approximately 5,000 in 2001 commune census.

Only primary schooling is available. It is also a site of industrial-scale mining. Farming and raising livestock provides employment for 40% and 40% of the working population. The most important crops are cassava and rice, while other important agricultural products are bananas and oranges. Industry and services provide employment for 19.7% and 0.3% of the population, respectively.

== Railroad ==
Ionilahy is a station on the Fianarantsoa-Côte Est railway.
