= List of music styles that incorporate the accordion =

This is a list of articles describing traditional music styles that incorporate the accordion, alphabetized by assumed region of origin.

Note that immigration has affected many styles: e.g. for the South American styles of traditional music, German and Czech immigrants arrived with accordions (usually button boxes) and the new instruments were incorporated into the local traditional music.

== Traditional music styles incorporating the accordion ==
Region	Style name	Main accordion type (if applicable)
Argentina	Tango; Chamamé, Cuarteto, Polka	Bandoneon; Diatonic button accordion
Austria	Alpine folk music	Steirische Harmonika (Diatonic button accordion)
Austria	Schrammelmusik	Schrammelharmonika (Chromatic button accordion)
The Bahamas	Rake-and-scrape	Diatonic button accordion
Basque Country	Basque music	Trikitixa (Diatonic button accordion)
Bohemia	Polka	
Bolivia	Huayno, Cueca	
Brazil	Forró (in northeastern Brazil); Rio Grande do Sul's traditional music, which include the following genres: Milonga, Chamamé, Polca, Tango, Valsa, Xote, Rasguido Doble, Vanera, Bugio, Chamarra and Rancheira; Sertanejo	Diatonic button accordion, Piano accordion, Bandoneon
Brittany	Breton 'Fest Noz' music	Diatonic button accordion, Chromatic Button Accordion C System
Bulgaria	Horo "Хоро"	
Canada	French-Canadian music, Music of Newfoundland and Labrador	
Canada	Inuit music	Diatonic button accordion
Cape Verde	Funaná	
Catalonia	Catalan folk music	Diatonic button accordion (Marimon style)
Colombia	Guasca, Cumbia, Vallenato, Pasillo	Diatonic button accordion
Caucasus	Lezginka	
Chile	Cueca	Piano accordion
Dominican Republic	Merengue	Diatonic button accordion
Eastern Europe	Klezmer	
Eastern Europe	Music of Southeastern Europe	Chromatic Button Accordion B System
Egypt	Baladi	
England	Morris Dancing, maritime music	Diatonic button accordion (melodeon), concertina
France	Bal-musette, Chanson réaliste	Diatonic button accordion
Greece	Rebetiko	
Honduras	Corrido, Cumbia	
Ireland (Éire)	Irish traditional music (ceol, "trad")	B/C, C#/D (23 key, 8 bass button accordion)
Italy	Saltarello	Organetto (2, 4, and 8 Bass Diatonic)
Italy	Tarantella	Organetto (2, 4, and 8 Bass Diatonic)
Japan	Ryūkōka	
Korea	Trot music	
Madagascar	Salegy, Batrelaky	
Mexico	Norteño, Corrido, Ranchera, Cumbia	
Netherlands	Levenslied	
Panama	Tamborito, Cumbia	
Paraguay	Chamamé	
Peru	Huayno, Vals	
Portugal	Pimba	
Puerto Rico	Plena	
Romania	Czardas, Generic traditional music not specified by name.	
Russia	Generic traditional music not specified by name.	
Scotland	Country Dance, Bothy Band	Piano accordion, Diatonic Button Accordion C, C#, D
Spain	Pasodoble, Jota	
Sonoran Desert	Chicken scratch	
South Africa	Boeremusiek	Concertina, Piano accordion
Switzerland	Yodel, Generic traditional music not specified by name.	
Thailand	Mor lam	
Thailand	Luk thung	
Turks and Caicos	Ripsaw music	
United Kingdom, Northern Ireland	Massed Accordion Band	Piano accordion
United States of America	Big band, Jazz	Piano accordion, Free-bass system
United States of America	Contra dance	Piano accordion, diatonic button accordion
United States of America	Cajun music	Diatonic button accordion
United States of America	Polka	Diatonic button accordion Piano accordion
United States of America	Tejano (Tex-Mex)	
United States of America	Western music	Piano accordion Diatonic button accordion
United States of America	Zydeco	
Uruguay	Chamarrita, Milonga. Polca, Ranchera, Tango, Vanera, Xote	Bandoneon; Diatonic button accordion (verdulera), Piano accordion (acordeona)
Venezuela	Joropo	
Various countries	Generic traditional music not specified by name, such as Swiss folk music, etc., that can be any one of the entries in the list of cultural and regional genres of music.	Various types
