= Tiavo Tem =

Malagasy football club

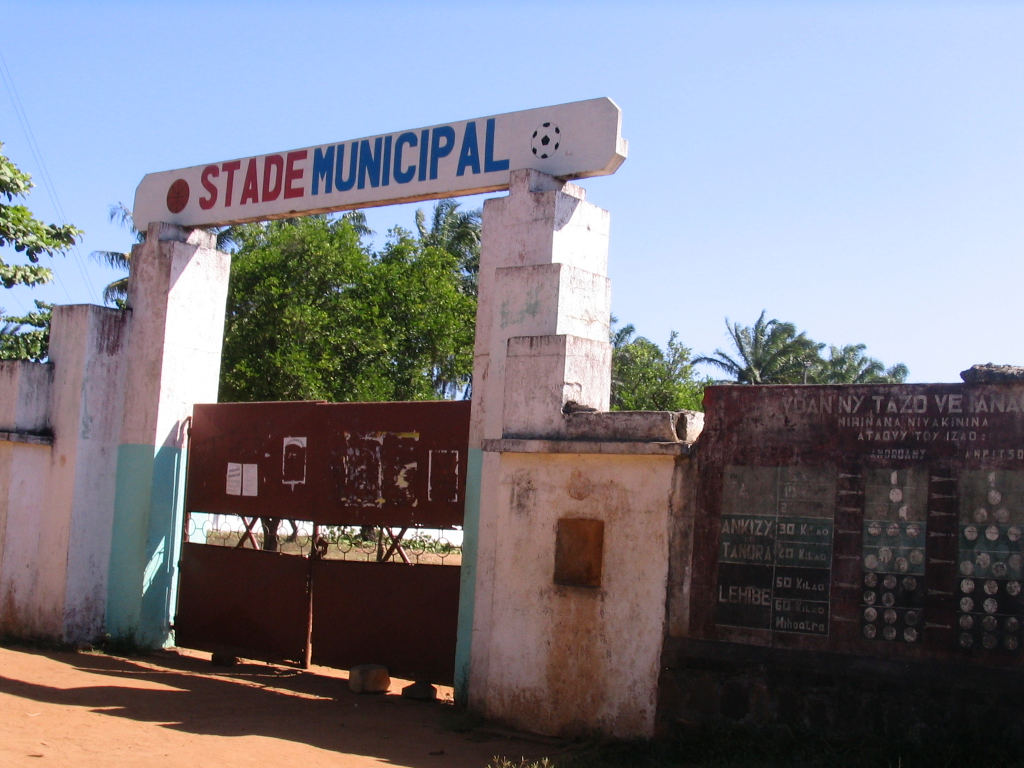
- Full name: Tiavo Tem FC Manakara
- Ground: Municipal Stadium, Madagascar
- League: THB Champions League

Tiavo Tem is a Malagasy football club from Manakara who currently plays in the THB Champions League the top division of Malagasy football. The team is based in Manakara, a city on the East coast of Madagascar.

== Stadium ==
Currently the team plays at the Municipal Stadium of Manakara.

== Honours ==
- Regional League champions 2012, 2013 and 2014
