= Mahabako =

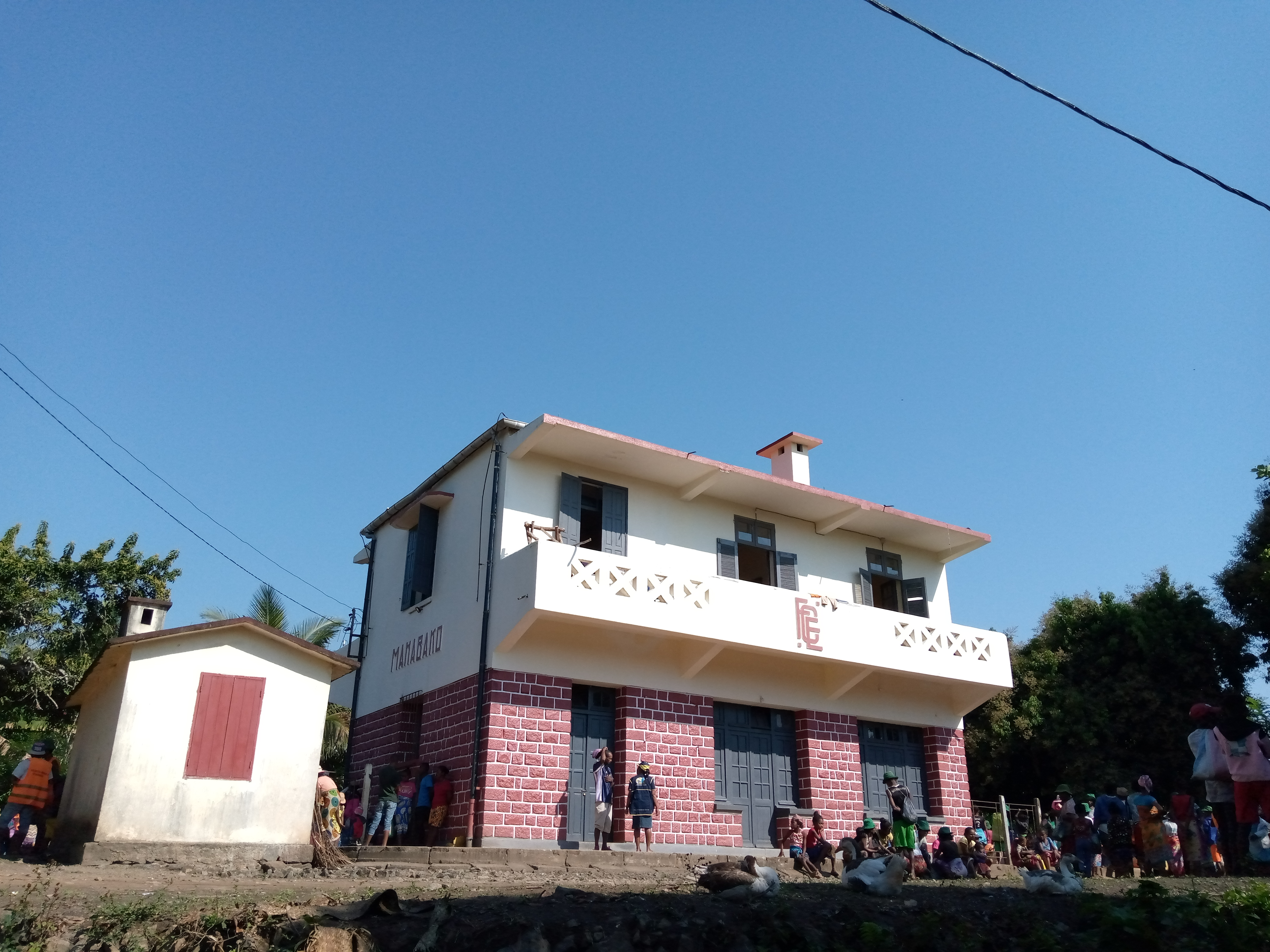
- train station of Mahabako

- Location in Madagascar
- Coordinates: 21°45′S 47°43′E
- Country: Madagascar
- Region: Fitovinany
- District: Manakara
- Elevation: 210 m (690 ft)

Population (2001)
  - Total: 10,000
- Time zone: UTC3 (EAT)

Mahabako is a rural municipality in Madagascar. It belongs to the district of Manakara-Atsimo, which is a part of Fitovinany. The population of the commune was estimated to be approximately 10,000 in 2001 commune census.

Primary and junior-level secondary education are available in town. Farming and raising livestock employs 40% and 40% of the working population. The most important crops are coffee and rice, while other important agricultural products are banana and cassava. Industry and services employ 5% and 15% of the population, respectively.

== Geography ==
It lies at the Faraony River and at the Fianarantsoa-Côte Est railway that links the town with Fianarantsoa and Manakara.
