= Ambalaroka =

- Location in Madagascar
- Coordinates: 22°8′S 47°44′E
- Country: Madagascar
- Region: Vatovavy-Fitovinany
- District: Manakara
- Elevation: 22 m (72 ft)

Population (2001)
  - Total: 22,000
- Time zone: UTC3 (EAT)

Ambalaroka is a town and commune in Madagascar. It belongs to the district of Manakara, which is a part of Vatovavy-Fitovinany Region. The population of the commune was estimated to be approximately 22,000 in 2001 commune census.

Only primary schooling is available. The majority 99% of the population of the commune are farmers. The most important crop is rice, while other important products are coffee and lychee. Services provide employment for 0.9% of the population. Additionally fishing employs 0.1% of the population.
