= Amborondra =

- Location in Madagascar
- Coordinates: 21°55′S 47°46′E
- Country: Madagascar
- Region: Vatovavy-Fitovinany
- District: Manakara
- Elevation: 206 m (676 ft)

Population (2001)
  - Total: 14,000
- Time zone: UTC3 (EAT)

Amborondra is a town and commune in Madagascar. It belongs to the district of Manakara, which is a part of Vatovavy-Fitovinany Region. The population of the commune was estimated to be approximately 14,000 in 2001 commune census.

Only primary schooling is available. The majority 98% of the population of the commune are farmers. The most important crops are coffee and rice, while other important agricultural products are bananas and cassava. Services provide employment for 2% of the population.
