= Anorombato =

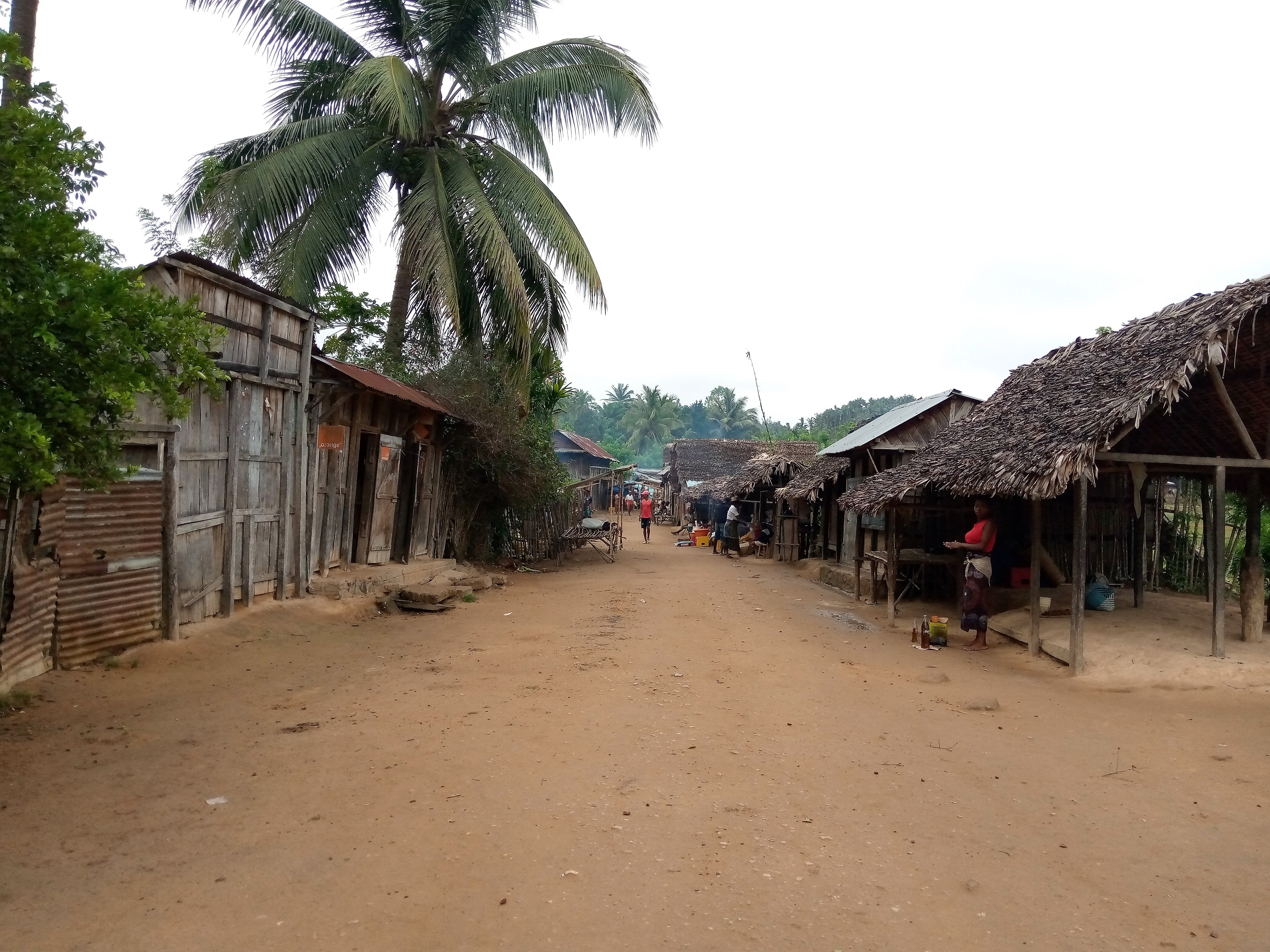

- Location in Madagascar
- Coordinates: 22°1′S 47°47′E
- Country: Madagascar
- Region: Fitovinany
- District: Manakara
- Elevation: 64 m (210 ft)

Population (2001)
  - Total: 12,000
- Time zone: UTC3 (EAT)
- Postal code: 316

Anorombato is a rural municipality in Madagascar. It belongs to the district of Manakara, which is a part of Fitovinany. The population of the commune was estimated to be approximately 12,000 in 2001 commune census.

Only primary schooling is available. The majority 98% of the population of the commune are farmers. The most important crops are coffee and rice; also bananas are an important agricultural product. Services provide employment for 2% of the population.
