= Tolongoina =

- Tolongoina

- Location in Madagascar
- Coordinates: 21°33′S 47°31′E
- Country: Madagascar
- Region: Fitovinany
- District: Ikongo
- Elevation: 436 m (1,430 ft)

Population (2001)
  - Total: 17,000
- Time zone: UTC3 (EAT)

Tolongoina is a town and commune in Madagascar. It belongs to the district of Ikongo, which is a part of Fitovinany region. The population of the commune was estimated to be approximately 17,000 in 2001 commune census.

Primary and junior level secondary education are available in town. The majority 85% of the population of the commune are farmers. The most important crops are bananas and ginger, while other important agricultural products are coffee and rice. Services provide employment for 15% of the population.

== Geography ==
It lies at the Fianarantsoa-Côte Est railway that links the town with Fianarantsoa and Manakara.

The unpaved National Road 14 links the town to Ifanadiana and the National Road 25.
