= Vohimasy, Manakara =

Vohimasy
- Location in Madagascar
- Coordinates: 22°6′S 47°47′E
- Country: Madagascar
- Region: Vatovavy-Fitovinany
- District: Manakara
- Elevation: 73 m (240 ft)

Population (2001)
  - Total: 19,000
- Time zone: UTC3 (EAT)

Vohimasy is a town and commune in Madagascar. It belongs to the district of Manakara, which is a part of Vatovavy-Fitovinany Region. The population of the commune was estimated to be approximately 19,000 in 2001 commune census.

Only primary schooling is available. The majority 99.5% of the population of the commune are farmers. The most important crop is rice, while other important products are bananas, coffee and cassava. Services provide employment for 0.5% of the population.
