= Anosiala, Manakara =

Coordinates: 22.0394°S 48.0294°E

Anosiala
- Interactive map of Anosiala
- Country: Madagascar
- Region: Vatovavy-Fitovinany
- District: Manakara

Population (2001)
  - Total: 9,000
- Time zone: UTC3 (EAT)

Anosiala is a town and commune in Madagascar. It belongs to the district of Manakara, which is a part of Vatovavy-Fitovinany Region. The population of the commune was estimated to be approximately 9,000 in 2001 commune census.

Only primary schooling is available. The majority 93% of the population of the commune are farmers. The most important crops are coffee and rice, while other important agricultural products are bananas and lychee. Services provide employment for 2% of the population. Additionally fishing employs 5% of the population.
