= Amboanjo =

- Location in Madagascar
- Coordinates: 22°0′S 47°51′E
- Country: Madagascar
- Region: Fitovinany
- District: Manakara
- Elevation: 27 m (89 ft)

Population (2001)
  - Total: 17,000
- Time zone: UTC3 (EAT)
- Postal code: 316

Amboanjo is a municipality in Madagascar. It belongs to the district of Manakara, which is a part of the region of Fitovinany. The population of the commune was estimated to be approximately 17,000 in 2001 commune census.

Primary and junior level secondary education are available in town. The majority 99.7% of the population of the commune are farmers. The most important crops are coffee and rice, while other important agricultural products are sugarcane and cassava. Services provide employment for 0.3% of the population.
