= Tataho =

- Location in Madagascar
- Coordinates: 22°13′S 47°58′E
- Country: Madagascar
- Region: Vatovavy-Fitovinany
- District: Manakara
- Elevation: 12 m (39 ft)

Population (2001)
  - Total: 4,000
- Time zone: UTC3 (EAT)

Tataho is a town and commune in Madagascar. It belongs to the district of Manakara, which is a part of Vatovavy-Fitovinany Region. The population of the commune was estimated to be approximately 4,000 in 2001 commune census.

Only primary schooling is available. It is also a site of industrial-scale mining. Farming and raising livestock provides employment for 42.5% and 42.5% of the working population. The most important crop is lychee, while other important products are cloves, mango, cassava and oranges. Industry and services provide employment for 14% and 1% of the population, respectively.
