= Sorombo =

- Location in Madagascar
- Coordinates: 22°6′S 47°55′E
- Country: Madagascar
- Region: Vatovavy-Fitovinany
- District: Manakara
- Elevation: 11 m (36 ft)

Population (2001)
  - Total: 12,000
- Time zone: UTC3 (EAT)

Sorombo is a town and commune in Madagascar. It belongs to the district of Manakara, which is a part of Vatovavy-Fitovinany Region. The population of the commune was estimated to be approximately 12,000 in 2001 commune census.

Only primary schooling is available. The majority 98% of the population of the commune are farmers, while an additional 0.5% receives their livelihood from raising livestock. The most important crop is rice, while other important products are coffee and cassava. Services provide employment for 1% of the population. Additionally fishing employs 0.5% of the population.
