= Vohilava, Manakara =

Vohilava
- Location in Madagascar
- Coordinates: 21°46′S 47°55′E
- Country: Madagascar
- Region: Vatovavy-Fitovinany
- District: Manakara
- Elevation: 33 m (108 ft)

Population (2001)
  - Total: 9,000
- Time zone: UTC3 (EAT)

Vohilava is a town and commune in Madagascar. It belongs to the district of Manakara, which is a part of Vatovavy-Fitovinany Region. The population of the commune was estimated to be approximately 9,000 in 2001 commune census.

Primary and junior level secondary education are available in town. The majority 99% of the population of the commune are farmers. The most important crop is rice, while other important products are bananas, coffee and cassava. Services provide employment for 1% of the population.
