= Transport in Madagascar =

Transportation networks and infrastructure in Madagascar

Paved and unpaved roadways, as well as railways, provide the main forms of transport in Madagascar. Madagascar has approximately 31,640 km (19,660 mi) of paved roads and 836 km of rail lines. In 2010, Madagascar had 432 km (270 mi) of navigable waterways.

== Railways ==
1000 mm railways in Madagascar

In 2018, Madagascar reported 836 km of rail lines. There are several rail lines and stations in Madagascar. Antananarivo is connected to Toamasina, Ambatondrazaka and Antsirabe by rail, and another rail line connects Fianarantsoa to Manakara. The northern railway (TCE) is concessioned to Madarail. The southern line, Fianarantsoa-Côte-Est railway (FCE), is a parastatal line.

== Roads ==
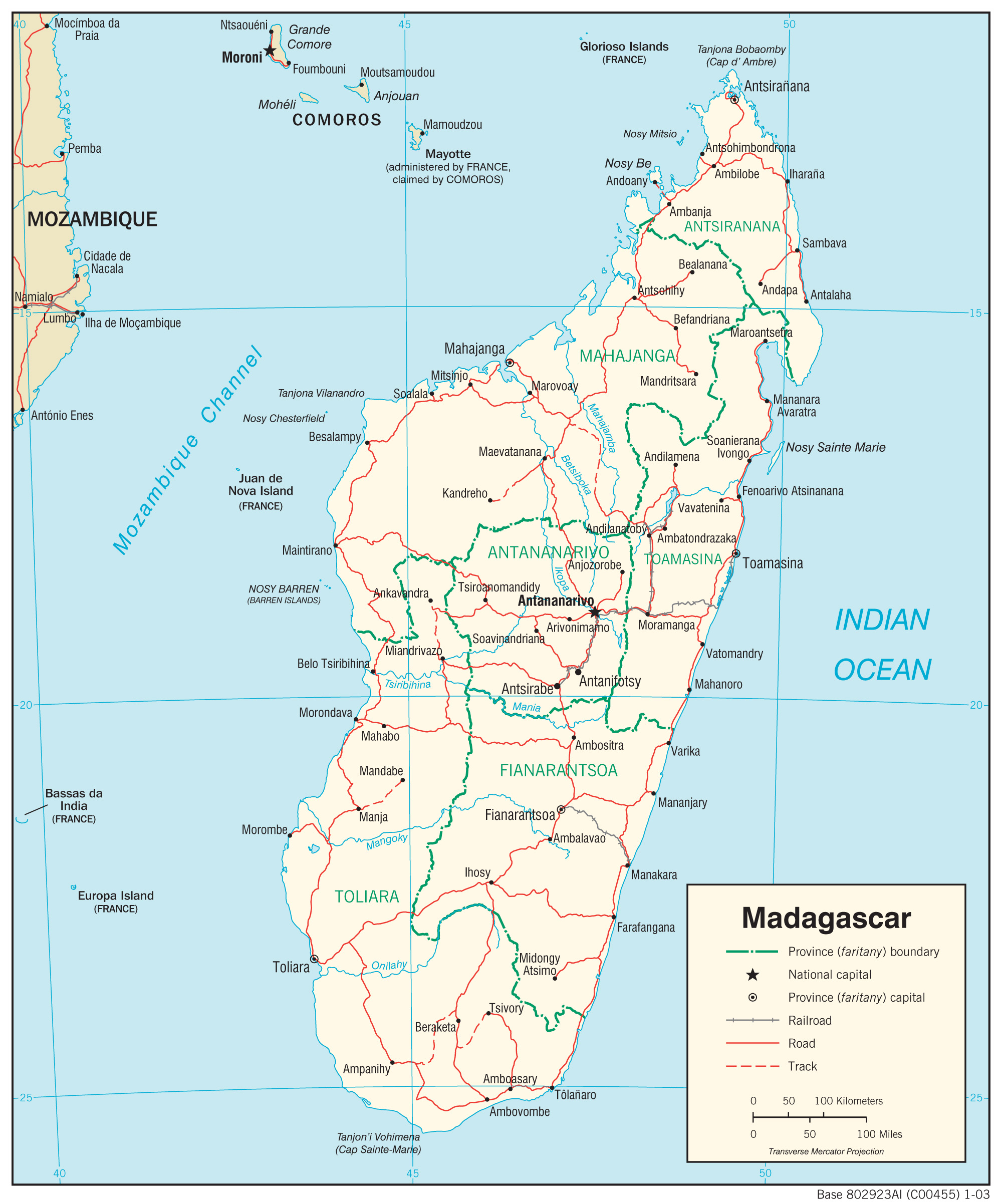
A road map of Madagascar, as of 2003

The road network of Madagascar, comprising about 4,500 unique roads spanning 31,640 kilometers (19,660 mi), is designed primarily to facilitate transportation to and from Antananarivo, the Malagasy capital. Transportation on these roads, most of which are unpaved and two lanes wide, is often dangerous. Few Malagasy own private vehicles; long-distance travel is often accomplished in taxi brousses ('bush taxis'), which may be shared by 20 or more people.

While most primary roads are in good condition, the World Food Programme has classified nearly two-thirds of the overall road network as being in poor condition. These conditions may make it dangerous to drive at moderate-to-high speeds and dahalo (bandit) attacks pose a threat at low speeds. Many roads are impassable during Madagascar's wet season; some bridges (often narrow, one-lane structures) are vulnerable to being swept away. Few rural Malagasy live near a road in good condition; poor road connectivity may pose challenges in health care, agriculture, and education.

Drivers in Madagascar travel on the right side of the road. On some roads, to deter attacks from dahalo, the government of Madagascar requires that drivers travel in convoys of at least ten vehicles. Car collision fatalities are not fully reported, but the rate is estimated to be among the highest in the world. Random police checkpoints, at which travelers are required to produce identity documents, are spread throughout the country. Crops are transported by ox cart locally and by truck inter-regionally. Human-powered vehicles, once the only means of road transport, are still found in the form of pousse-pousses (rickshaws). Taxi brousses constitute a rudimentary road-based public transportation system in Madagascar. Rides on taxi brousses cost as little as 200 Malagasy ariary (roughly US$0.10) as of 2005, and vehicles involved are often overpacked, sometimes with the assistant driver riding on the outside of the vehicle. Stops on their routes are generally not fixed, allowing passengers to exit at arbitrary points.

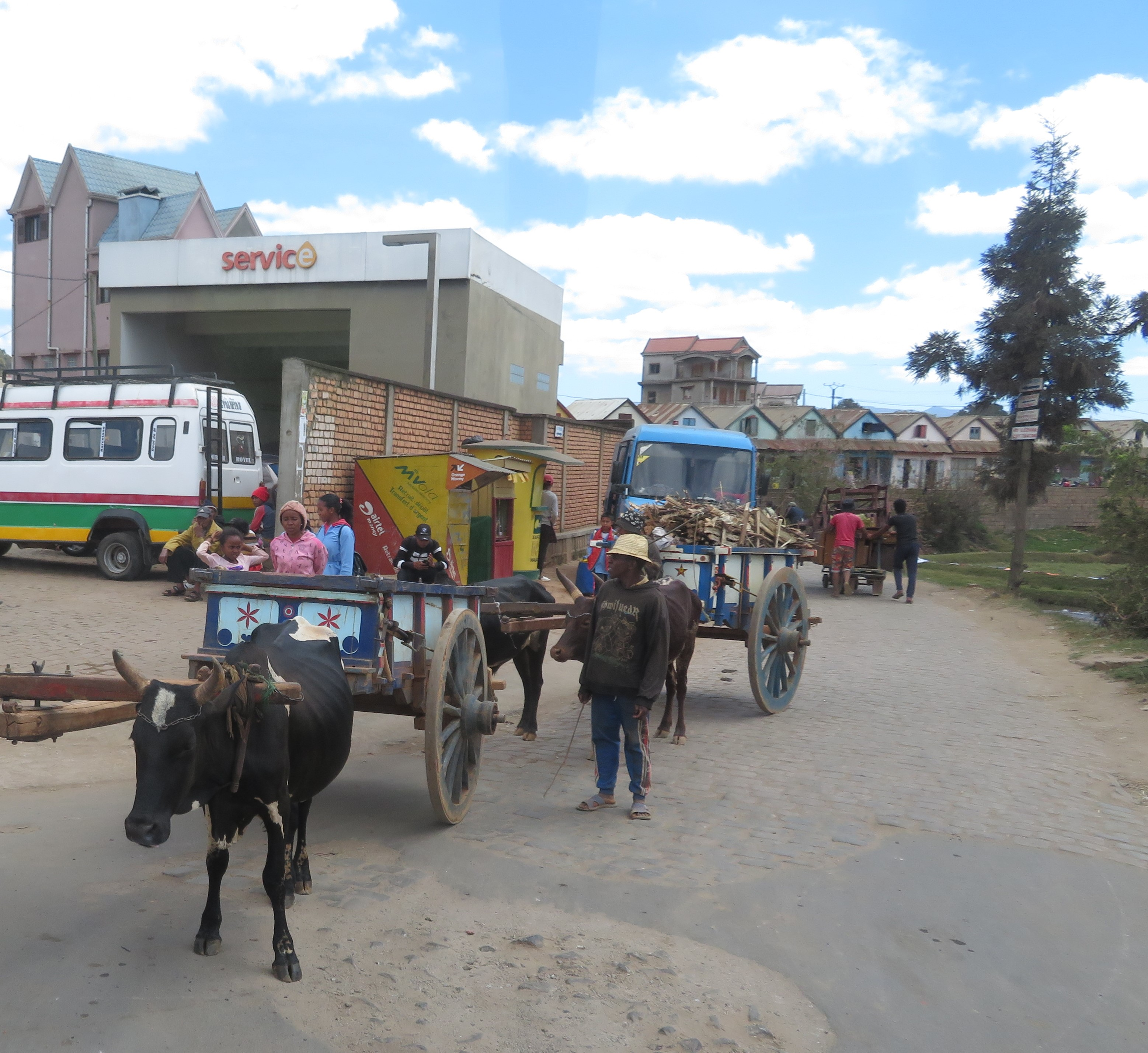
In many places oxcarts are an important medium of transport, like in Ambatolampy

== Waterways ==
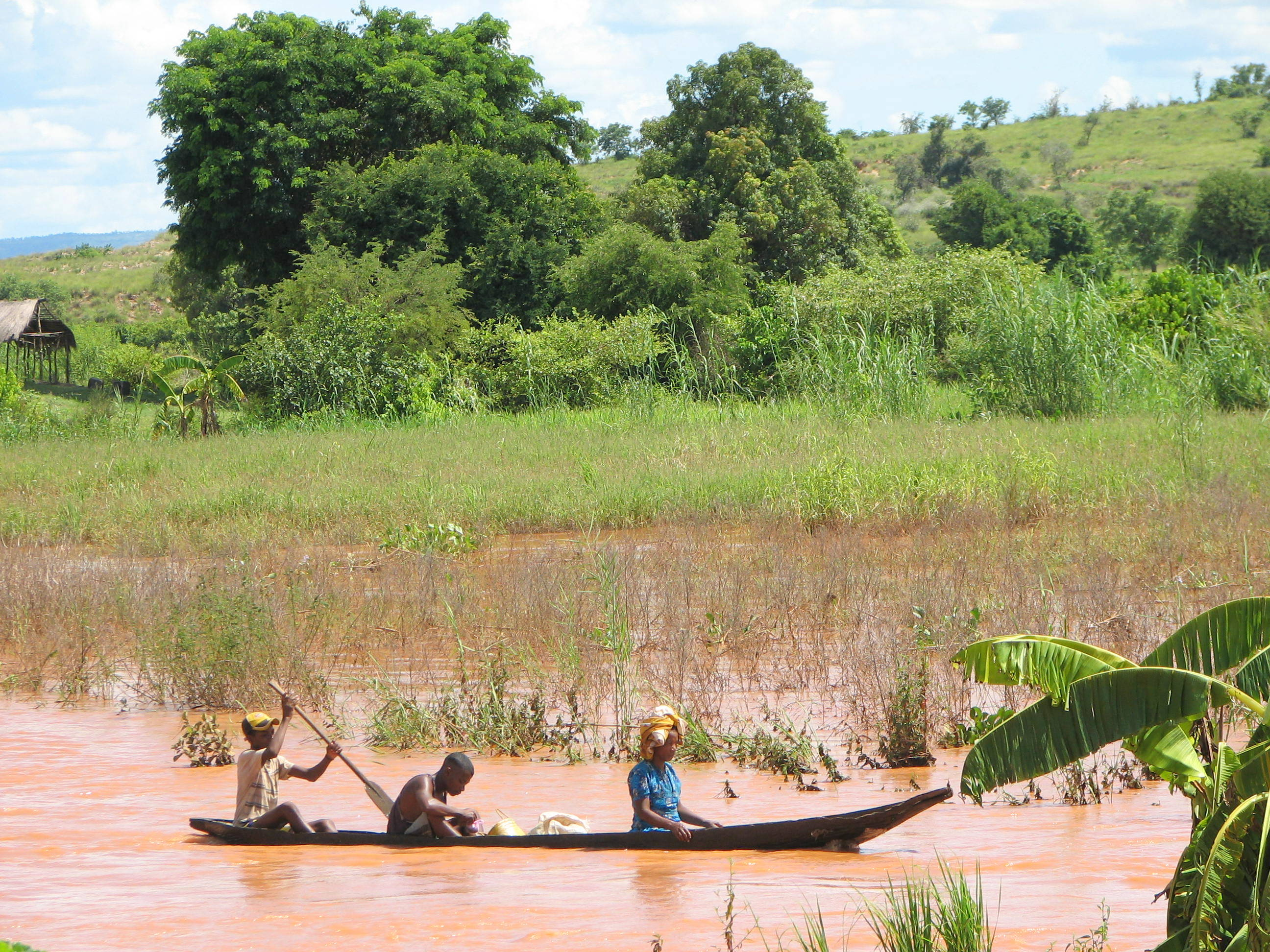
A pirogue on the Tsiribihina River

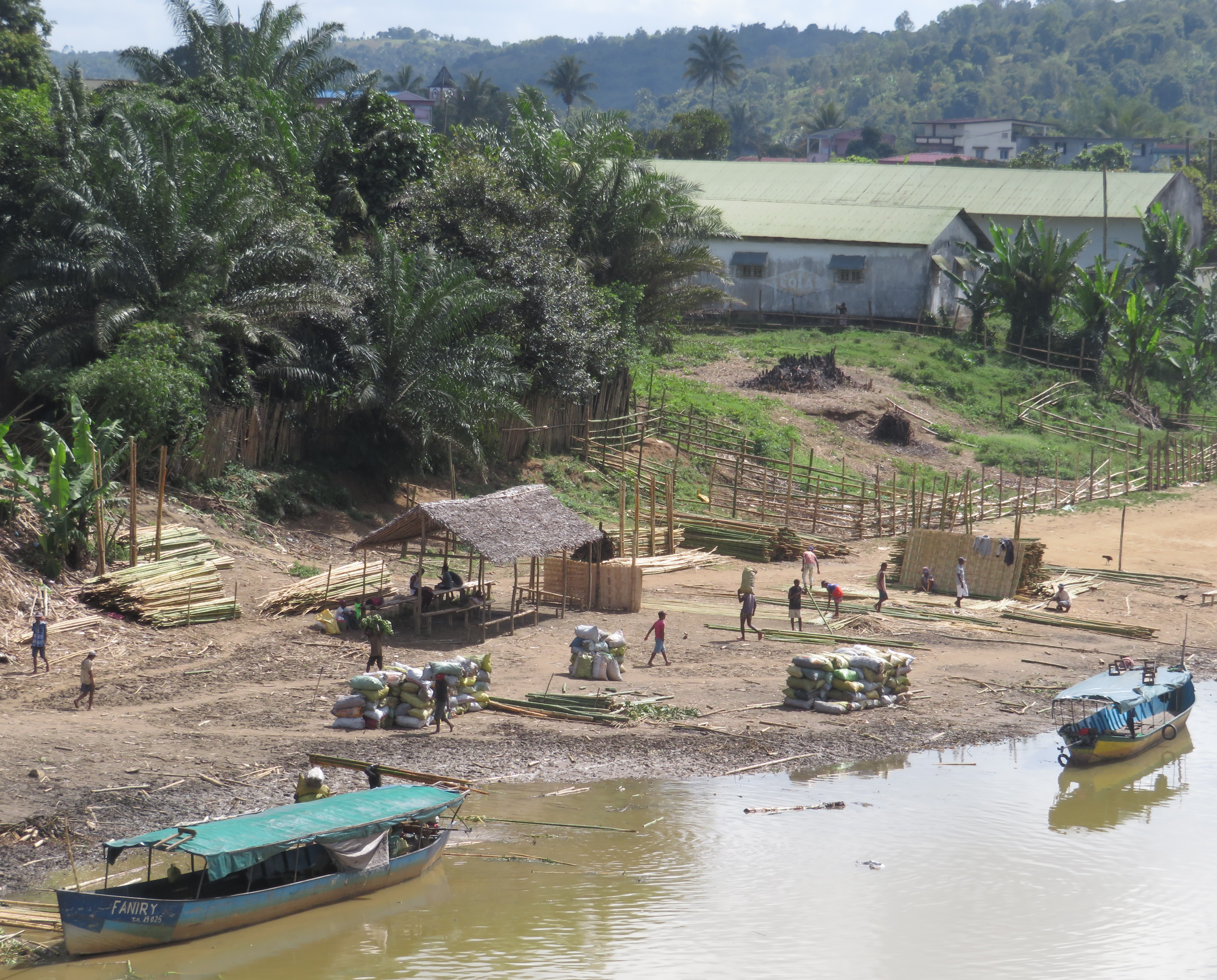
Inland harbour on river Rianila in Brickaville

The relatively short rivers of Madagascar are typically of local importance only; isolated streams and small portions of Lakandranon' Ampangalana (Canal des Pangalanes) are navigated by pirogue. Coastal inter-city transport routes are found along the west coast.

Madagascar has 600 km of waterways, 432 km of which are navigable.

== Ports and harbors ==
The most important seaport in Madagascar is located on the east coast at Toamasina. Ports at Toliara, Mahajanga, and Antsiranana are significantly less used because of their remoteness. The island's newest port at Port d'Ehola, constructed in 2008 and privately managed by Rio Tinto, will come under state control upon completion of the company's mining project near Tôlanaro around 2038. The country's principal cargo port is Toamasina Autonomous Port.

in the early 2000s, Madagascar's customs authorities introduced Electronic Cargo Tracking Note (ECTN) regulations over all of the country's ports, locally referred to as BSC (Bordereau de Suivi des Cargaisons) or CTN, a number that must be listed within the bill of lading, and registered before landing within the country.

== Airports ==
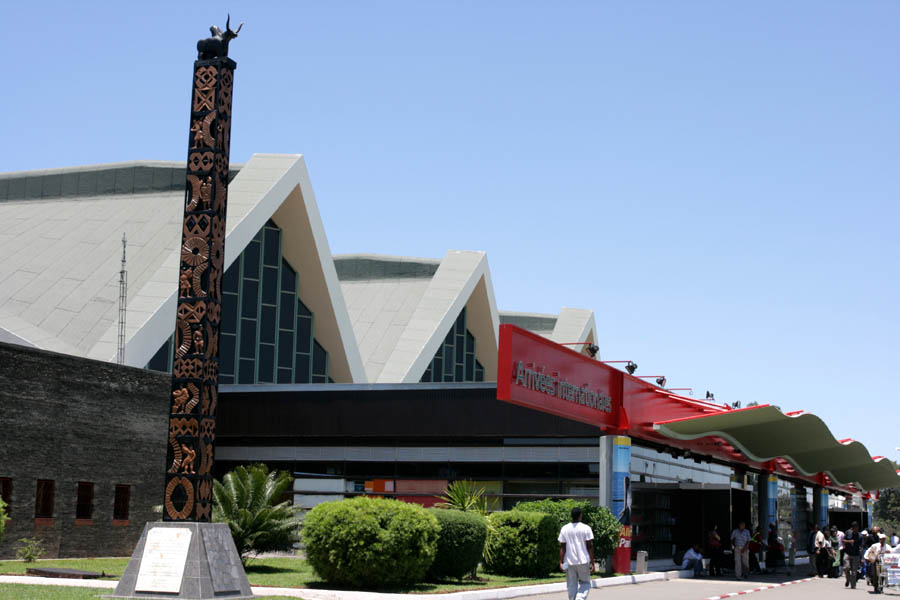
The exterior of Ivato International Airport

The main international airport in Madagascar is Ivato International Airport in Antananarivo. Air Madagascar services the island's many small regional airports, which offer the only practical means of access to many of the more remote regions during rainy season road washouts. There are 26 airports with paved runways and 57 airports with unpaved runways. In 2018, Madagascar carried 544,458 air passengers.

== See also ==
- List of airports by ICAO code: FA-FM § Madagascar
