= Ampasimanjeva =

Town and commune in Madagascar, with agriculture as main industry

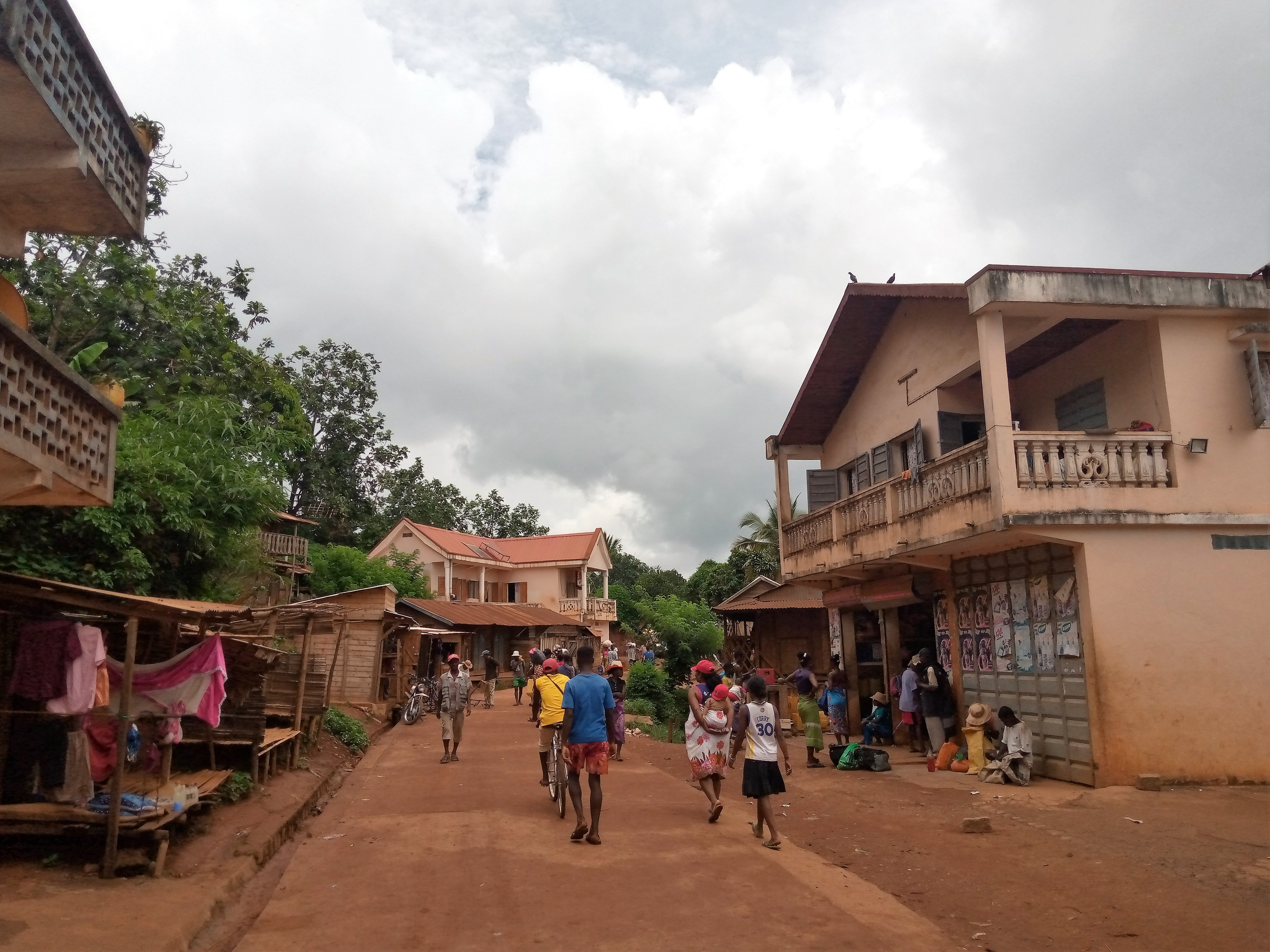
- Ampasimanjeva

- Location in Madagascar
- Coordinates: 21°44′S 48°2′E
- Country: Madagascar
- Region: Fitovinany
- District: Manakara
- Elevation: 10 m (33 ft)

Population (2001)
  - Total: 22,000
- Time zone: UTC3 (EAT)

Ampasimanjeva is a town and commune in Madagascar. It belongs to the district of Manakara, which is a part of Fitovinany region. The population of the commune was estimated to be approximately 22,000 in 2001 commune census.

The town is crossed by the Faraony River.

Primary and junior level secondary education are available in town. The town provides access to hospital services to its citizens. The majority 92.5% of the population of the commune are farmers. The most important crops are rice and cloves; also cassava is an important agricultural product. Industry and services provide employment for 0.25% and 7% of the population, respectively. Additionally fishing employs 0.25% of the population.
