= Manampatrana =

- Location in Madagascar
- Coordinates: 21°39′S 47°35′E
- Country: Madagascar
- Region: Fitovinany
- District: Ikongo
- Elevation: 283 m (928 ft)

Population (2001)
  - Total: 18,000
- Time zone: UTC3 (EAT)
- Postal code: 310

Manampatrana is a rural municipality in Madagascar. It belongs to the district of Ikongo, which is a part of Fitovinany. The population of this municipality was estimated to be approximately 18,000 in 2001 census.

Primary and junior level secondary education are available in town. The majority 85% of the population of the commune are farmers. The most important crops are coffee and rice, while other important agricultural products are bananas, cassava and sweet potatoes. Services provide employment for 15% of the population.

It lies at the Faraony River and the Fianarantsoa-Côte Est railway that links the town with Fianarantsoa and Manakara.
