= Sahambavy =

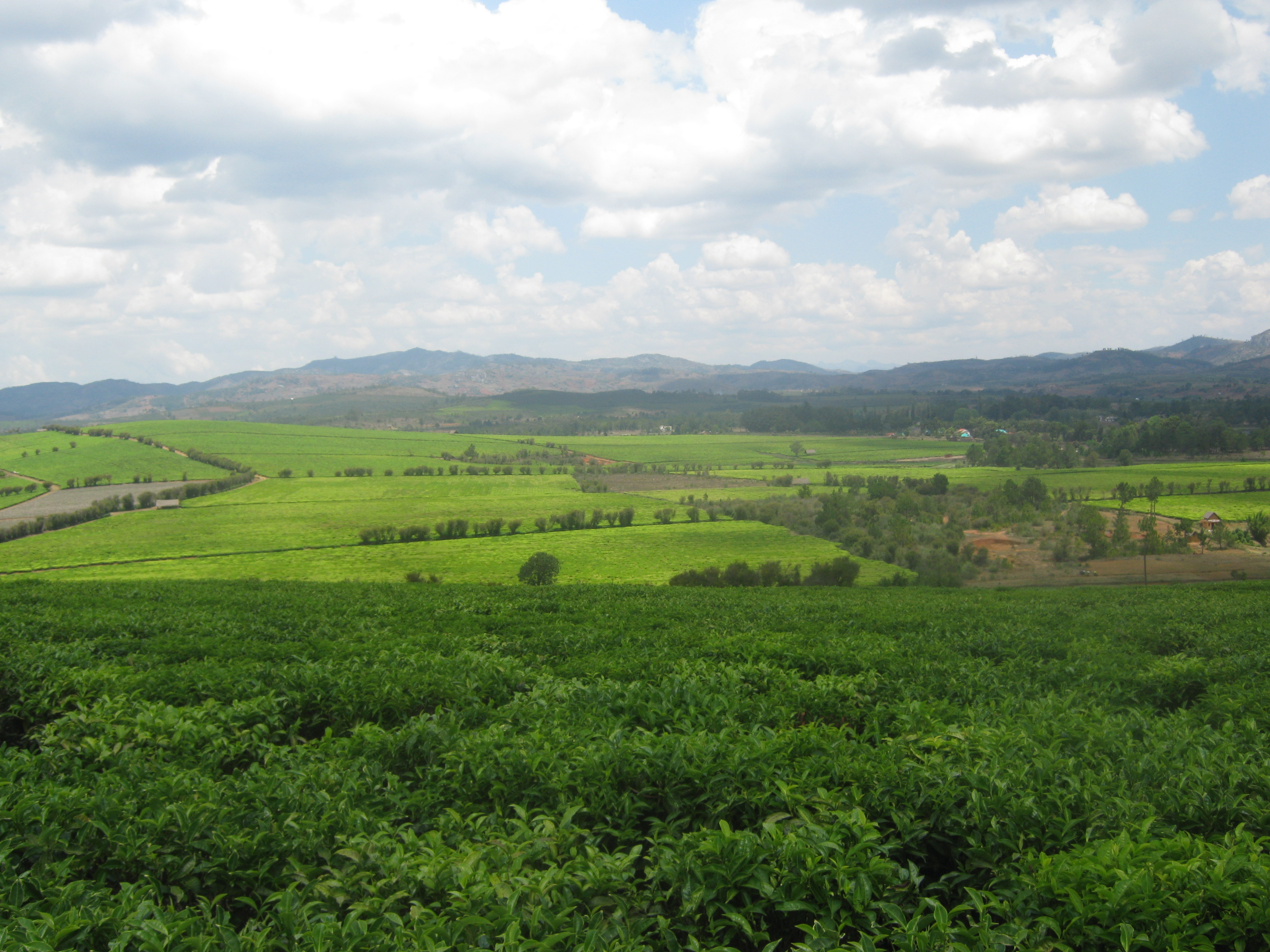
- tea plantations at Sahambavy

- Location in Madagascar
- Coordinates: 21°26′S 47°17′E
- Country: Madagascar
- Region: Haute Matsiatra
- District: Lalangina
- Elevation: 1,116 m (3,661 ft)

Population (2018)
  - Total: 19.403
- Time zone: UTC3 (EAT)
- Postal code: 303

Sahambavy is a rural municipality in Madagascar. It belongs to the district of Lalangina, which is a part of Haute Matsiatra Region. The population of the commune was estimated to be approximately 19.403 in 2018.

Primary and junior level secondary education are available in town. The majority 58% of the population of the commune are farmers, while an additional 30% receives their livelihood from raising livestock. The most important crops is rice, while other important agricultural products are cassava and potatoes. Industry and services provide employment for 10% and 2% of the population, respectively.

Unique plantation of tea in Madagascar is situated in this commune. It covers almost 500 hectares. The main part of the production is exported to Kenya. It has been set up in 1970.

== Geography ==
It lies at the Fianarantsoa-Côte Est railway that links the town with Fianarantsoa and Manakara.

== Lakes ==
- Lake Sahambavy
