= Sahasinaka =

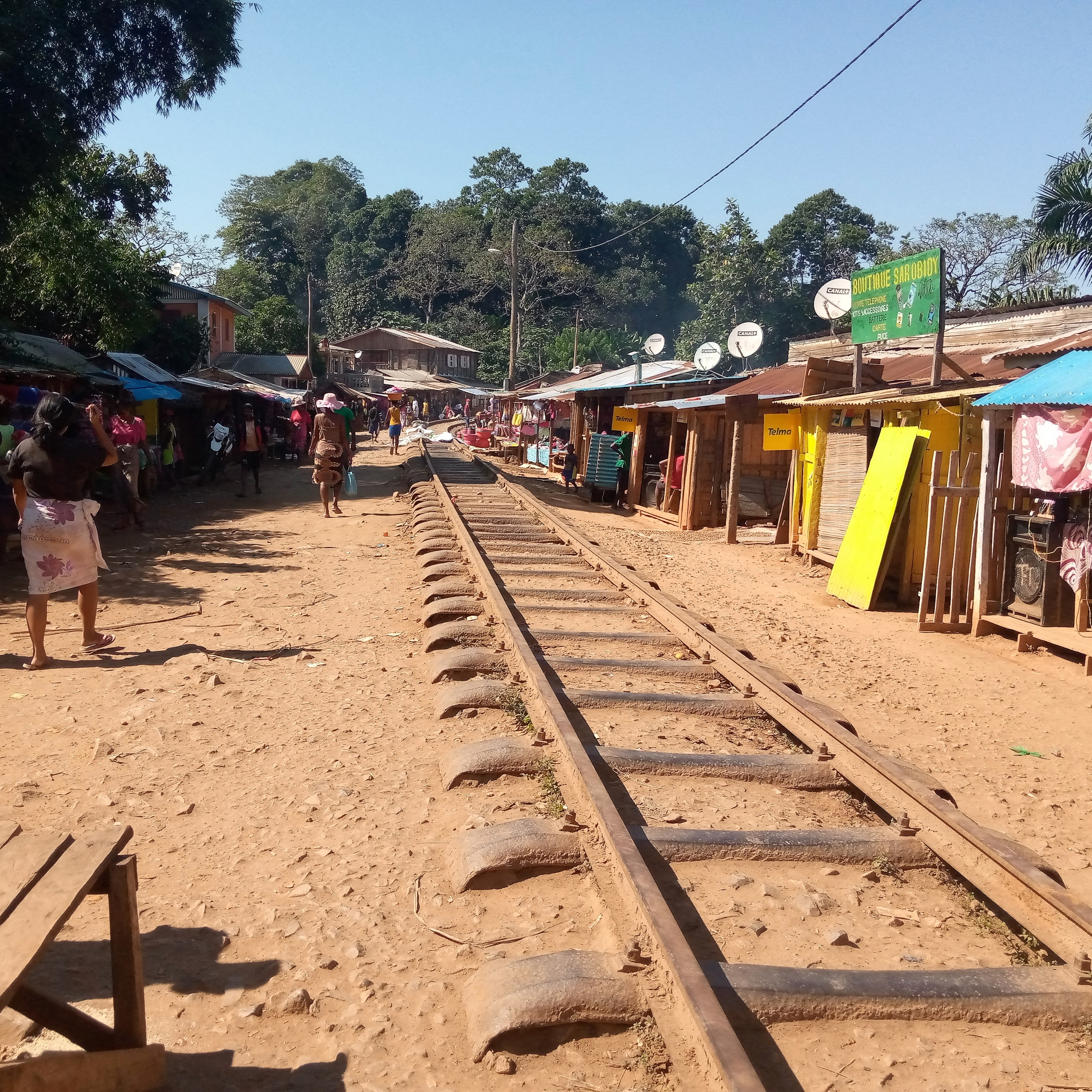
- Village of Sahasinaka

- Location in Madagascar
- Coordinates: 21°48′S 47°50′E
- Country: Madagascar
- Region: Fitovinany
- District: Manakara

Area
  - Total: 142 km^{2} (55 sq mi)
- Elevation: 39 m (128 ft)
- Time zone: UTC3 (EAT)
- Postal code: 316

Sahasinaka is a municipality in the Manakara district of the Fitovinany Region in Madagascar.

This municipality is situated at 42 Km north-west from Manakara. It lies at the Faraony River and Fangorinana River and the Fianarantsoa-Côte Est railway that links the town with Fianarantsoa and Manakara.

== Agriculture ==
The economy is based on agriculture. Rice and coffee are grown, new is the plantation of cloves. For the local consumption also manioc is planted.

== Sights ==
The viaduct of the Fianarantsoa-Côte Est railway and the Faraony River waterfalls at a distance of 4km.
