= Manakara Airport =

Airport in Manakara, Fitovinany, Madagascar

- IATA: WVK; ICAO: FMSK

Summary
- Airport type: Public
- Operator: ADEMA (Aéroports de Madagascar)
- Serves: Manakara
- Location: Fitovinany, Madagascar
- Elevation AMSL: 33 ft / 10 m
- Coordinates: 22°07′11″S 48°01′18″E

Map
- Location within Madagascar

Runways
Direction	Length		Surface
Direction	ft	m	Surface
05/23	3,886	1,184	Asphalt
- DAFIF

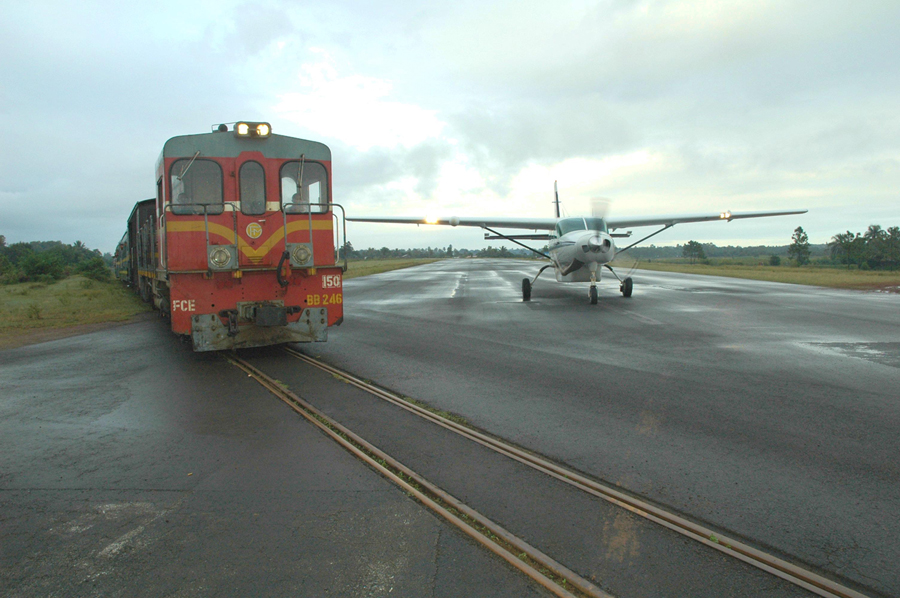
A train crossing the runway

Manakara Airport (IATA: WVK, ICAO: FMSK) is an airport in Manakara, Fitovinany, Madagascar, located on the east coast on the island.

The Fianarantsoa-Côte Est railway crosses the runway of this airport, making it is one of only a few airports in the world that crosses a live railway line. The other current airport is Gisborne Airport in New Zealand. Peshawar Airport in Pakistan also formerly held this distinction, but the railway has now been closed.
