= Toamasina Autonomous Port =

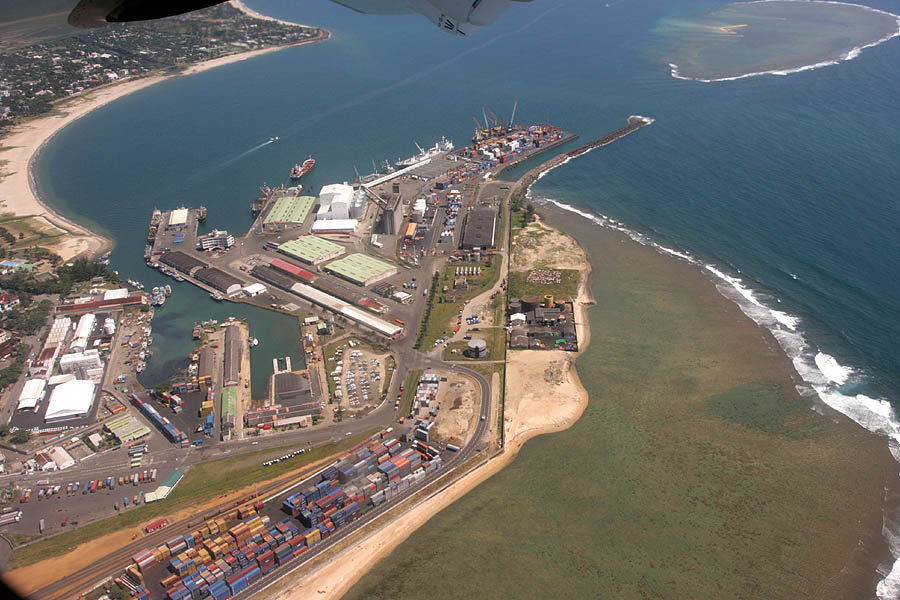
Port Toamasina

Toamasina Autonomous Port or (in French) Société de Gestion du Port Autonome de Toamasina (SPAT) is a Malagasy government body that governs and regulates the Indian Ocean port of Toamasina. The operation of the port has been contracted to Madagascar International Container Terminal Services (MICTS), a subsidiary of Filipino company International Container Terminal Services Inc. Toamasina is Madagascar's primary cargo port.

== Passenger transport ==
There is a monthly passenger service from Toamasina to La Réunion and Mauritius with MS Mauritius Trochetia operated by Mauritius Shipping Corporation Ltd.

== See also ==
- Government of Madagascar
- Port authority
- Port operator
- Transport in Madagascar
