= Jürgen Ganzer =

German composer and accordionist

Jürgen Ganzer (born 6 August 1950) is a German composer and accordionist. He is a professor of Tonsatz and instrumentation at the Musikgymnasium Carl Philipp Emanuel Bach.

== Life ==
Born in Potsdam, Ganzer attended the Musikgymnasium Carl Philipp Emanuel Bach from 1965 to 1969. From 1969 to 1975 he studied composition with Wolfram Heicking and accordion with Christine and Hans Boll at the Hochschule für Musik Hanns Eisle in Berlin.

He worked as a freelance composer, teacher, répétiteur and arranger at the Volksbühne Berlin, the Berliner Ensemble and the Friedrichstadt-Palast. His focus was on Lieder, songs and folklore. From 1979 on he gave concerts as an accordion duo and in world music formations. Ganzer composed electronic music, chamber music, film (Die Wokrenterstrasse, 1986), theatre- and radio drama music. He devoted himself especially to the guitar and the accordion.

From 1983 until the fall of the Berlin Wall, he was a member of the Competition Commission of the Central Expert Commission for Accordion of the GDR. In 1996, he was chairman of the jury of the International Accordion Competition Coupe Mondiale of the Confédération Internationale des Accordeonistes (CIA, IMC-UNESCO). Since 1978 he teaches at the Berlin Musikhochschule. He became a lecturer for composition and ton setting in 1988 and professor for composition and instrumentation in 1993.

== Prizes ==
- First prize at the accordion soloist competition of the GDR (1972)
- Chamber music prize at the composition competition of the radio programme of the Stimme der DDR (1972)
- Winner of the duo competition at the Internationaler Akkordeonwettbewerb Klingenthal (1985, 1986)
