= Organetto =

Italian accordion

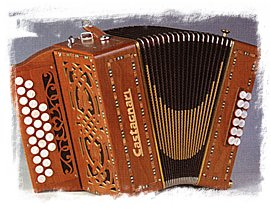
An organetto

The modern organetto is a small diatonic button accordion used in Italian folk music. It is often used to play the saltarello.
