= Analavory, Manakara =

Analavory
- Location in Madagascar
- Coordinates: 21°42′S 47°57′E
- Country: Madagascar
- Region: Vatovavy-Fitovinany
- District: Manakara
- Elevation: 48 m (157 ft)

Population (2001)
  - Total: 6,000
- Time zone: UTC3 (EAT)

Analavory is a town and commune in Madagascar. It belongs to the district of Manakara, which is a part of Vatovavy-Fitovinany Region. The population of the commune was estimated to be approximately 6,000 in 2001 commune census.

Only primary schooling is available. It is also a site of industrial-scale mining. The majority 98% of the population of the commune are farmers. The most important crops are coffee and rice, while other important agricultural products are cloves and cassava. Services provide employment for 2% of the population.
