= Fianarantsoa-Côte Est railway =

Railway line in Madagascar

Fianarantsoa–Côte Est
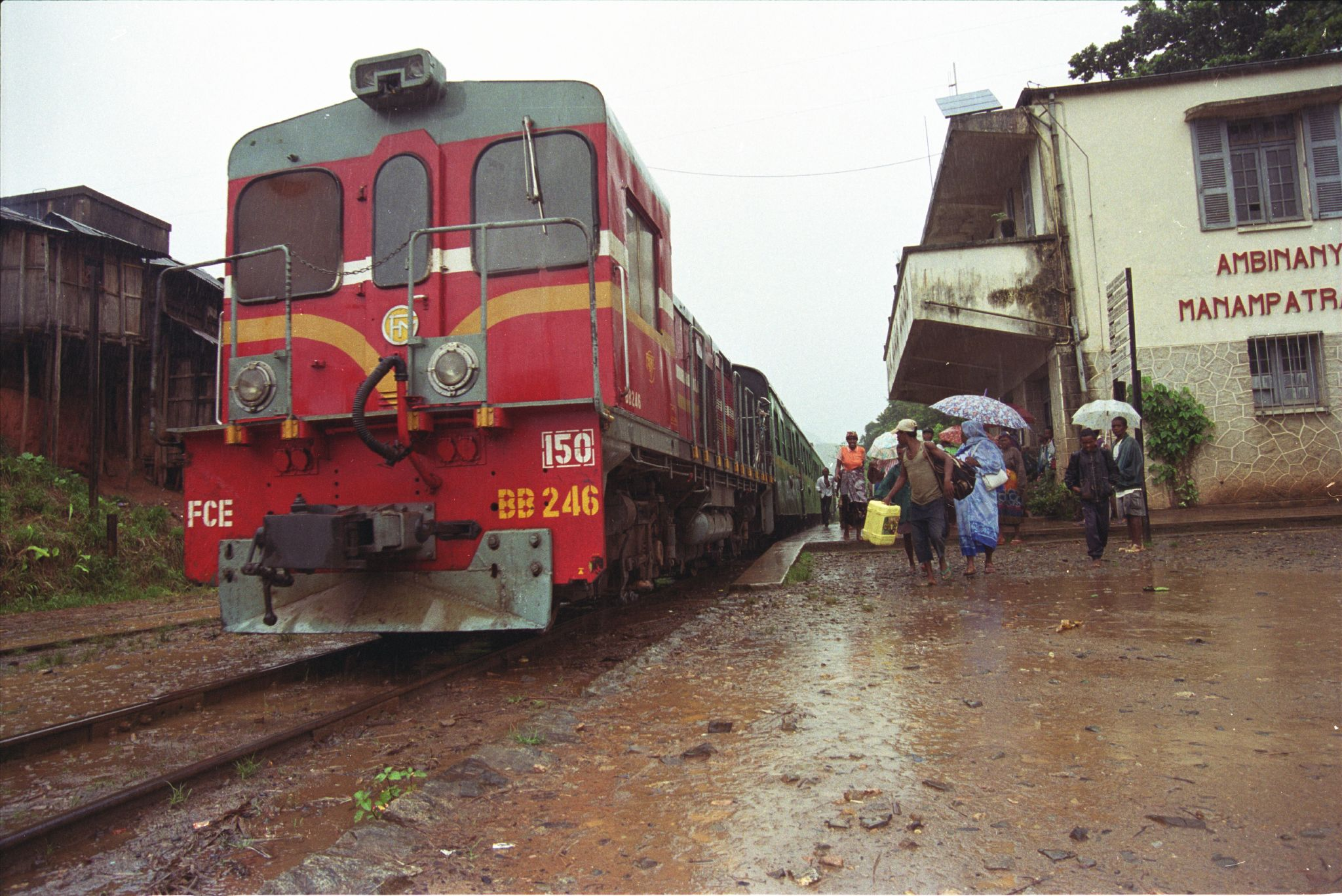
- An FCE train at Manampatrana

Overview
- Status: Open
- Owner: Fianarantsoa–Côte Est
- Locale: Haute Matsiatra / Fitovinany, Madagascar
- Termini: Fianarantsoa; Manakara

Service
- Type: Heavy rail

History
- Opened: 1936

Technical
- Line length: 162.8 km (101.2 mi)
- Track gauge: 1,000 mm (3 ft 3 3/8 in) metre gauge
- Maximum incline: 3.5%

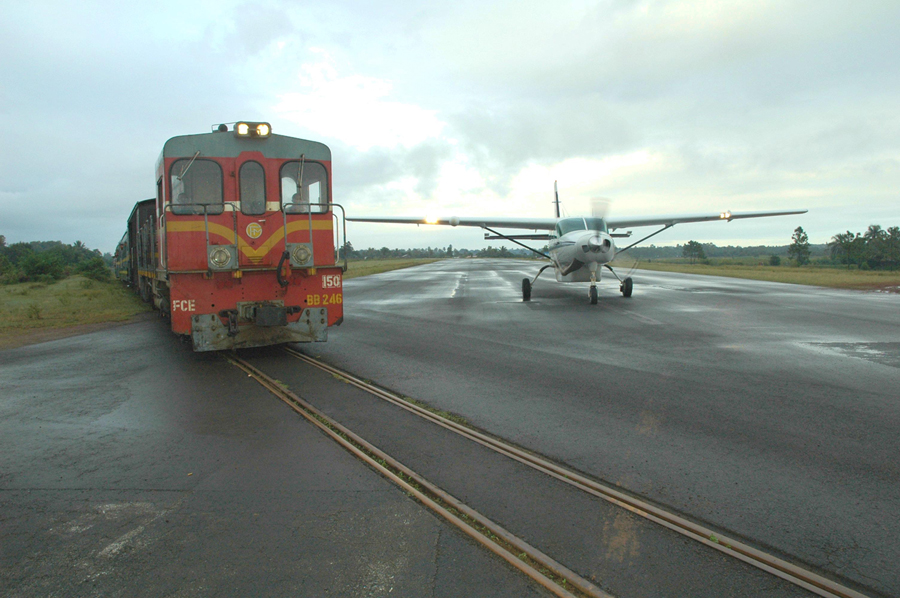
Rail-runway-crossing

The Fianarantsoa-Côte Est (FCE) railway is a colonial-built railway in southeast Madagascar that connects the high plateau city of Fianarantsoa to the port city of Manakara. It is 163 kilometers long and was built by the French between 1926 and 1936 using the forced-labor program SMOTIG. The French used rails and ties taken from Germany as World War I reparations to build the line. Many of the railways still have the date of manufacturing on them dating back to 1893.

This line traverses some of the most threatened habitat in the world. In 2000, back-to-back cyclones caused 280 landslides and four major washouts cut service for months until a rehabilitation project was launched with help from USAID, Swiss Railways and others. A study conducted by the Project d'Appui à la Gestion de l'Environnement (PAGE) in 2000 concluded that keeping the train operational helps prevent deforestation to the tune of 97,400 hectares over 20 years. Interviews conducted with villagers during the temporary closure found that they would have no choice but to cut down their tree-based crops that they shipped to market on the railway and plant rice or cassava instead.

The FCE is currently running, but its aging infrastructure makes it vulnerable to service disruptions caused by broken rails, old rolling stock and landslides caused by cyclones.

The railway crosses the runway of Manakara Airport, one of only three places in the world where a railway crosses a runway at grade.

== Stations ==
- Manakara - port - PK 163.270 – 4 meters
- Ambila - PK 146.267 – 12 meters
- Mizilo Gara - PK 136.850 – 26 meters
- Antsaka - PK 128.200 – 39 meters
- Sahasinaka - PK 118.300 – 39 meters
- Fenomby - PK 106.650 – 190 meters
- Mahabako - PK 99.000 – 195 meters
- Ionilahy - PK 82.700 – 211 meters
- Manampatrana or Ambinany-Manampatrana - PK 78.800 – 206 meters
- Amboanjobe - PK 71.680 – 356 meters
- Tolongoina - PK 61.900 – 390 meters
- Madiorano - PK 54.225 – 609 meters
- Andrambovato - PK 45.278 – 878 meters
- Ranomena - PK 38.520 – 1061 meters
- Ampitambe - PK 28.540 – 1064 meters
- Sahambavy - PK 21.440 – 1079 meters
- Vohimasina - PK 9.510 – 1018 meters
- Fianarantsoa - PK 0 – 1100 meters

== Rolling material ==
- 3 locomotives Alsthom BB 242, 243 and 245
- 2 draisines YC 048 and 051
- 1 Micheline ZM
- 6 station wagons
- 22 freight wagons

In 2020 the FCE received three Spanish second hand locomotives Serie 1500 de Renfe built in 1964.

== See also ==
- History of rail transport in Madagascar
- Rail transport in Madagascar
