= Faraony River =

- Map of Malagasy rivers (Faraony flows from the central part to the eastern coast).

Location
- Country: Madagascar
- Region: Fitovinany
- City: Ampasimanjeva

Physical characteristics
- Mouth
  - location: Indian Ocean
  - coordinates: 21°48′09″S 48°09′58″E
  - elevation: 0m
- Length: 150 km (93 mi)
- Basin size: 2,695 km^{2} (1,041 mi^{2}) to 2,776 km^{2} (1,072 mi^{2})
- Discharge
  - location: Near mouth
  - average: (Period: 1971–2000)77.1 m^{3}/s (2,720 cu ft/s)

Basin features
- River system: Faraony River

Faraony is a river in Fitovinany, eastern Madagascar. It flows down from the central highlands to the Indian Ocean. It flows through Manampatrana, Vohimanitra, Mahabako, Sahasinaka, Mahavoky, Vohimasina Nord and empties south of Namorona in the Indian Ocean.

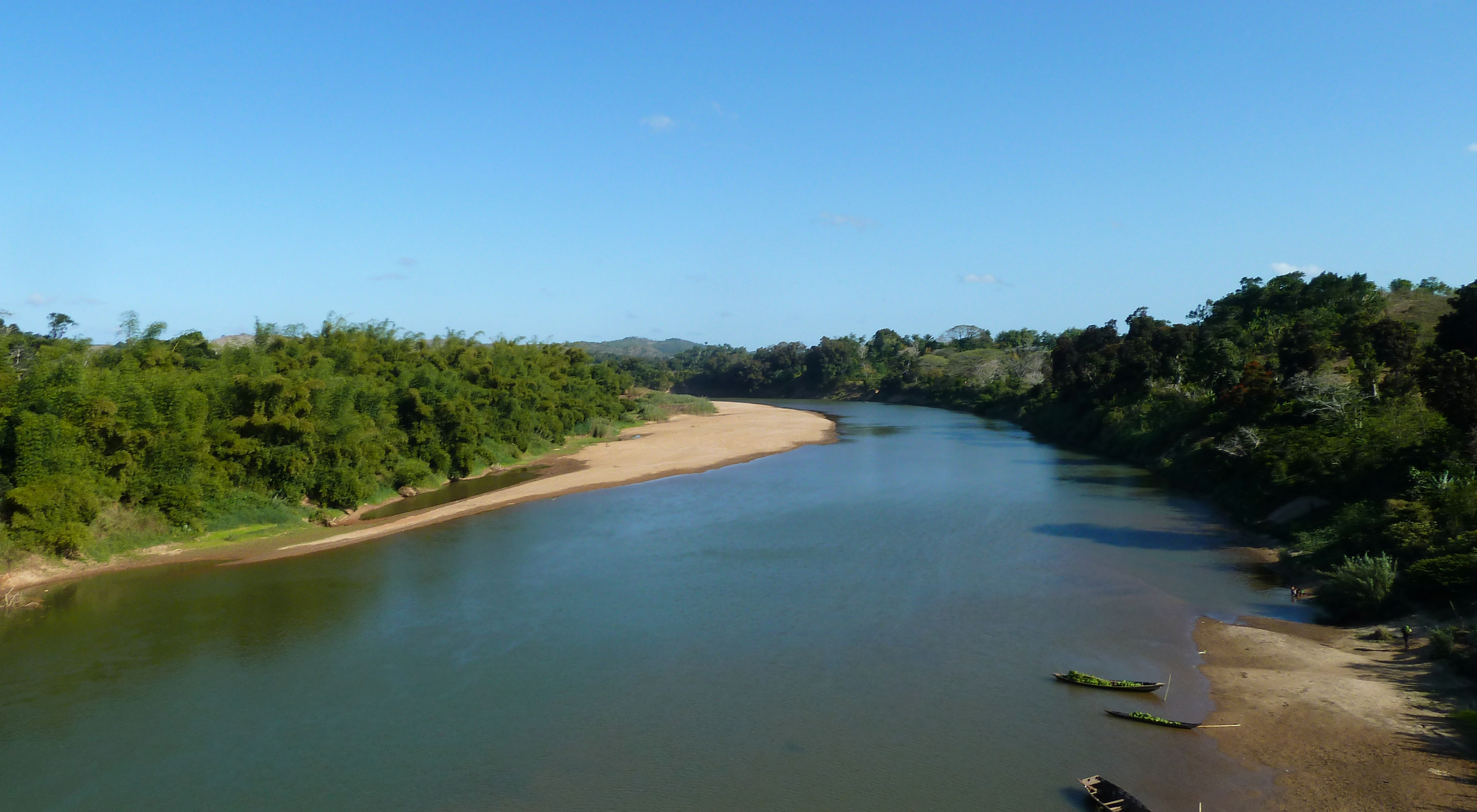
Faraony from RN 12

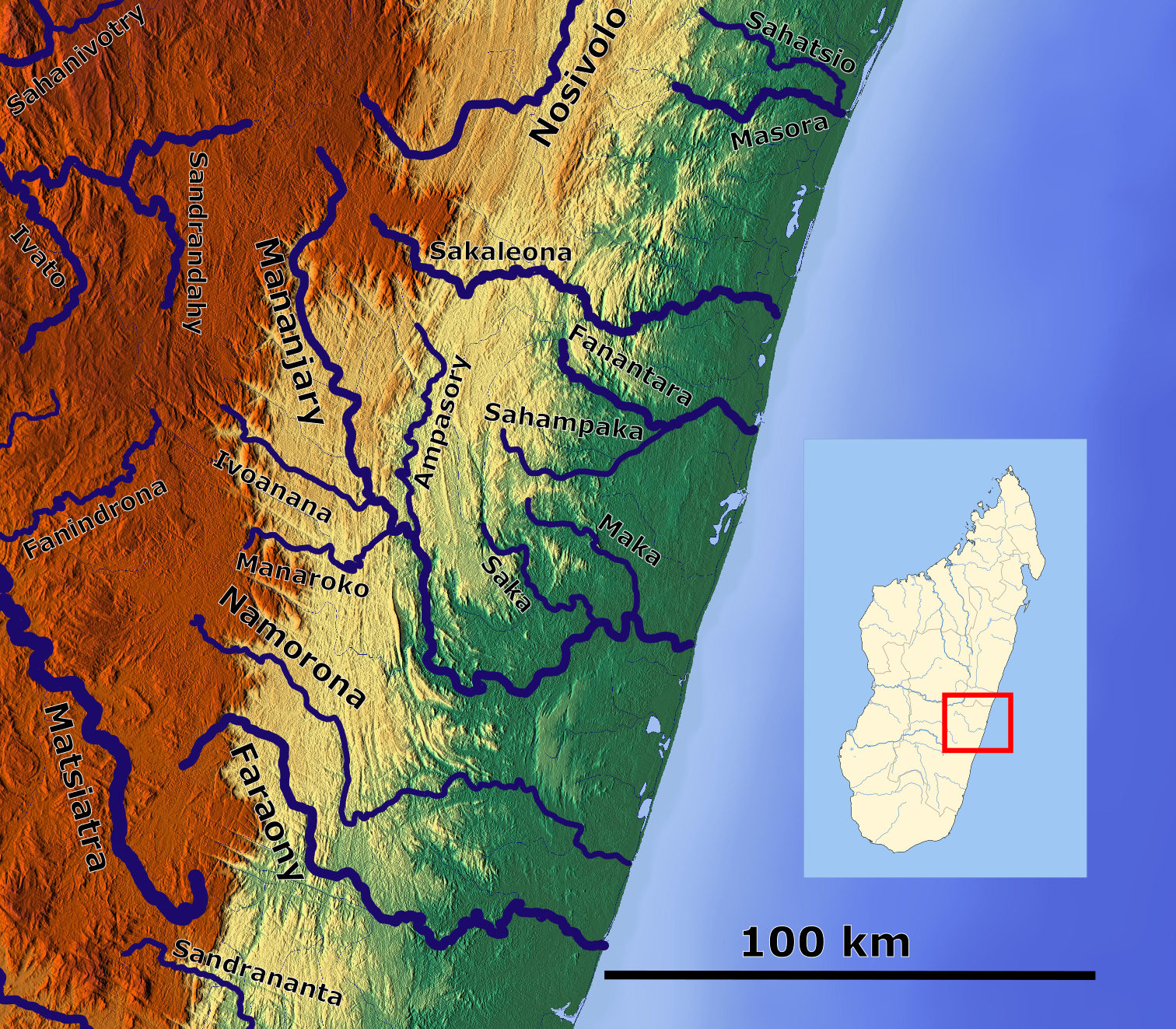
Faraony bassin
