= Route nationale 12 (Madagascar) =

Road in Madagascar

Route information
- Length: 240 km (150 mi)
- Existed: 1936–present

Major junctions
- From: Fort-Dauphin
- To: Vangaindrano

Location
- Country: Madagascar

Highway system
- Roads in Madagascar

Route nationale 12 (RN 12) is a primary highway in Madagascar of 240 kilometers (150 mi), running from Irondro to Vangaindrano. It crosses the regions of Vatovavy, Fitovinany and Atsimo-Atsinanana. It is paved but partly in bad condition.

== History ==
The road was constructed in 1936, while the island was governed as the colony of French Madagascar. Construction of the road was conducted as corvée work; the French did not provide to the Antaisaka laborers during the day, an omission considered to be barbaric by the island's natives, and would arrest and imprison the natives who did not show up to participate in the construction for a period of 15 days.

The road, upon its construction, was initially one of the best roads in Madagascar for travel, and was created with twelve ferries to bring people and vehicles across waterways. As time passed, however, the road fell into disrepair. By 1998, the highway had become an entirely dirt road and the ferry services had become unreliable; the road had become almost always partly impassible to vehicular traffic.

== Selected locations on route ==
(north to south)

- Irondro (intersection with RN 25)
- Mizilo Gara (railway)
- Manakara - 118km
- Vohipeno - 202 km
- Farafangana - 224 km
- Vangaindrano - 299 km

The section between Vohipeno and Farafangana is paved.

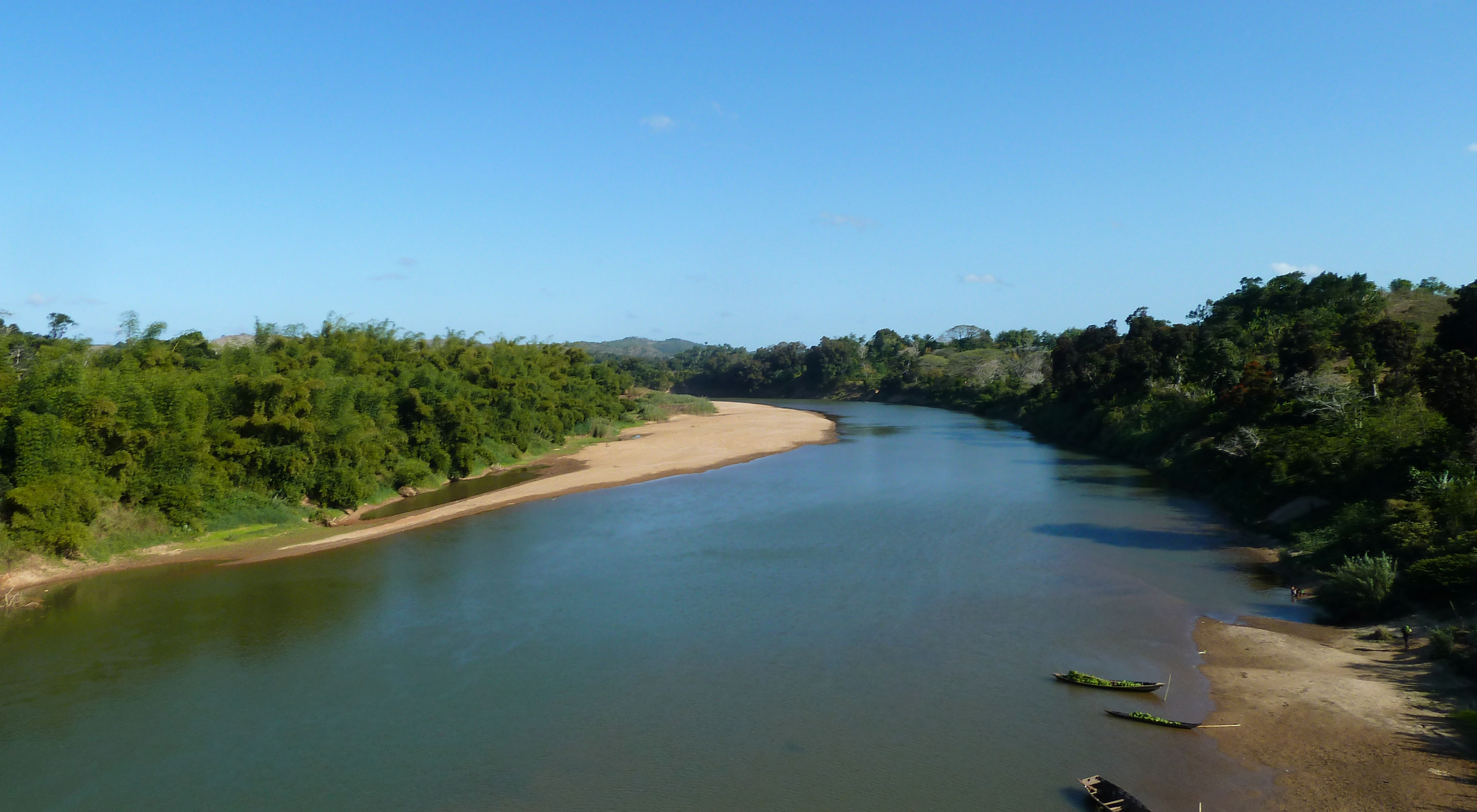
Faraony River from RN 12

== See also ==
- List of roads in Madagascar
- Transport in Madagascar
