= Manakara =

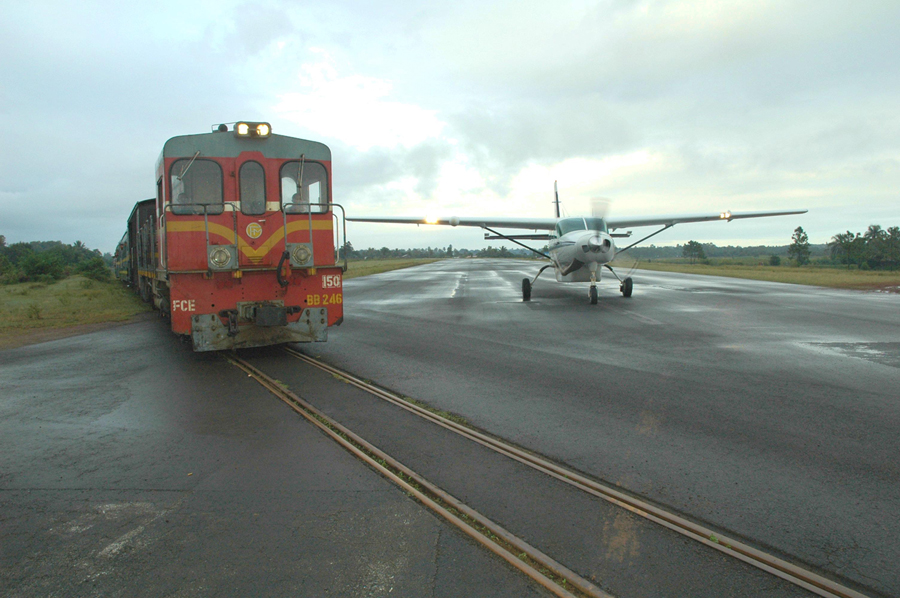
- Rail-run-way crossing

- Location in Madagascar
- Coordinates: 22°09′0″S 48°00′0″E
- Country: Madagascar
- Region: Fitovinany
- District: Manakara

Area
  - Total: 29.1 km^{2} (11.2 sq mi)

Population (2018 census)
  - Total: 44,237
  - Density: 1,520/km^{2} (3,940/sq mi)
- Postal code: 316

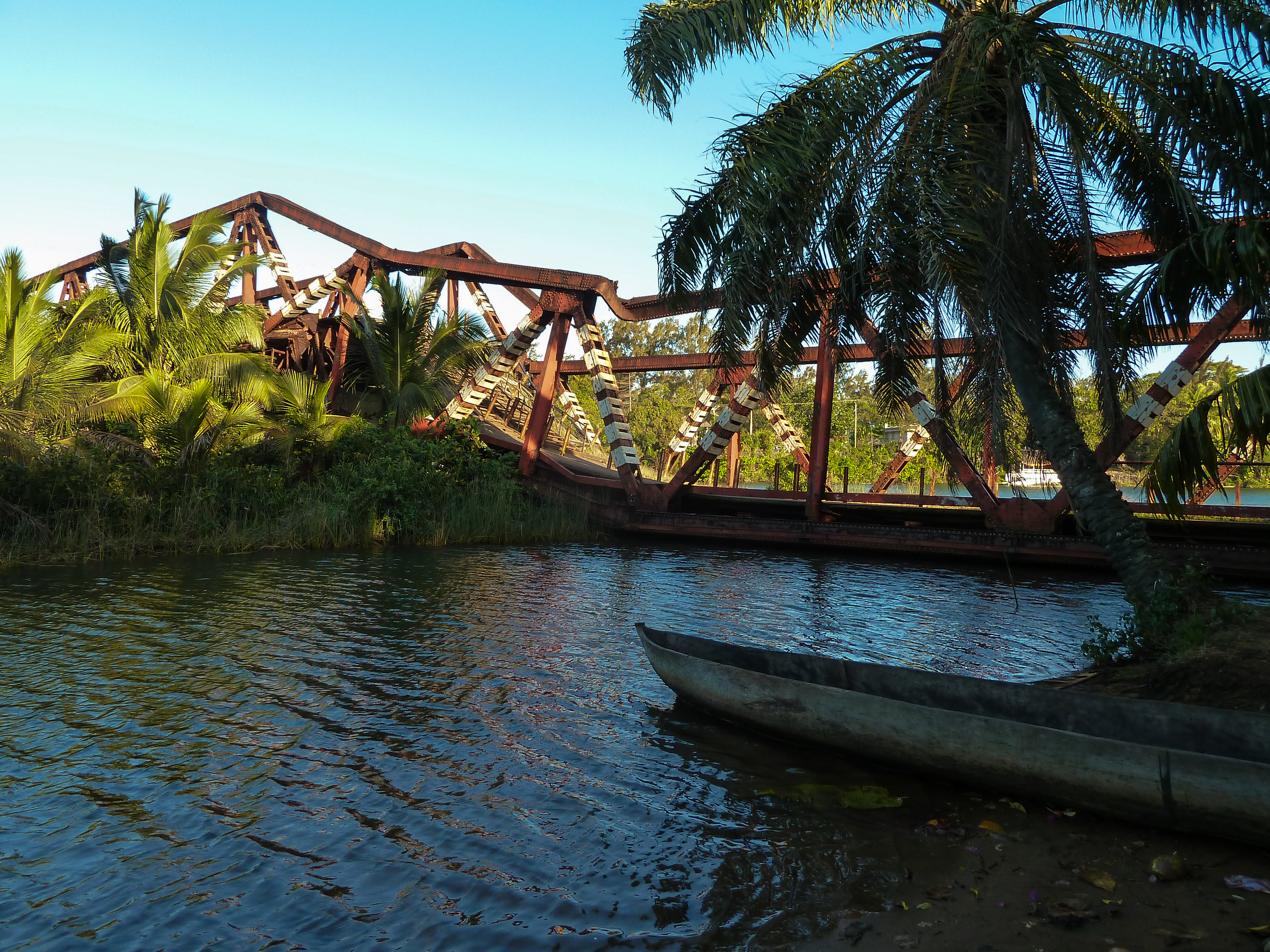
Manakara - collapsed bridge over Manakara river

Manakara is a city in Madagascar. It is the capital of the Fitovinany Region and of the district of Manakara Atsimo. The city is located at the east coast near the mouth of the Manakara River and has a small port. Its temperature on average is 27 degrees Celsius, the high is 32 and low is 10.

== Infrastructure ==
=== Railroad ===
Manakara is the endpoint of the Fianarantsoa-Côte Est railway (FCE), which connects the city of Fianarantsoa with the sea.

=== Roads ===
The National road 12, from Irondro (North, 118km, intersection with RN 25) - Manakara to Farafangana (224 km, south) and Vangaindrano (299 km).

The bridge over the Manakara River that connected the northern and southern parts of the city partially collapsed in September 2012.

=== Airport ===
Manakara Airport is one of the few places where a railway crosses a runway. There are no commercial flights to Manakara.

== Education ==
French international schools:

- École primaire française Les Pangalanes

== Twin cities ==
- Parthenay (France)
