= Fitovinany =

Coordinates: 22°08′42″S 48°00′36″E

- Region
- Location in Madagascar
- Country: Madagascar
- Capital: Manakara

Government
  - Chef de Region: Jean Brunelle Razafitsiandraofa

Population (2018)
  - Total: 730,207
- Time zone: UTC3 (EAT)

Fitovinany is a region located in southeast Madagascar. Its capital is Manakara. It is inhabited by the Antemoro people. The region border is based on the historical region of Matatana or Matitana.

It formerly belonged to the region Vatovavy-Fitovinany that was split on 16 June 2021 to become the regions Vatovavy and Fitovinany.

The region extends along the southern part of the east coast of Madagascar. It is bordered by Vatovavy (North), Haute Matsiatra (West) and Atsimo-Atsinanana (South).

== Administrative divisions ==
Fitovinany Region is divided into three districts, which are sub-divided into 76 communes.

- Ikongo District - 17 communes
- Manakara-Atsimo District - 42 communes
- Vohipeno District - 17 communes

== Economy ==
Fitovinany produces 1/3 of the coffee that is produced in Madagascar. It is also wellknown for its honey production and it is rich in mineral resources.

== Transportation ==
- Manakara is the end station of the Fianarantsoa-Côte Est Railway.
- Car, Taxi-Brousse
- One airport and one seaport:
  - Manakara Airport
  - Manakara seaport is only used for transshipments and transit (Lychee, coffee, ...)

=== Roads ===
The National Road 12 from Irondro (intersection with RN 25) over Manakara to Vangaindrano.

== Protected areas ==
- Part of Fandriana-Vondrozo Corridor
- Part of Marolambo National Park
- Part of Ranomafana National Park (Vatovavy)
- Midongy Atsimo National Park 90 km from Vangaindrano
- Manombo Reserve, halfway between Vangaindrano and Farafangana
