= Vatovavy-Fitovinany =

- Region
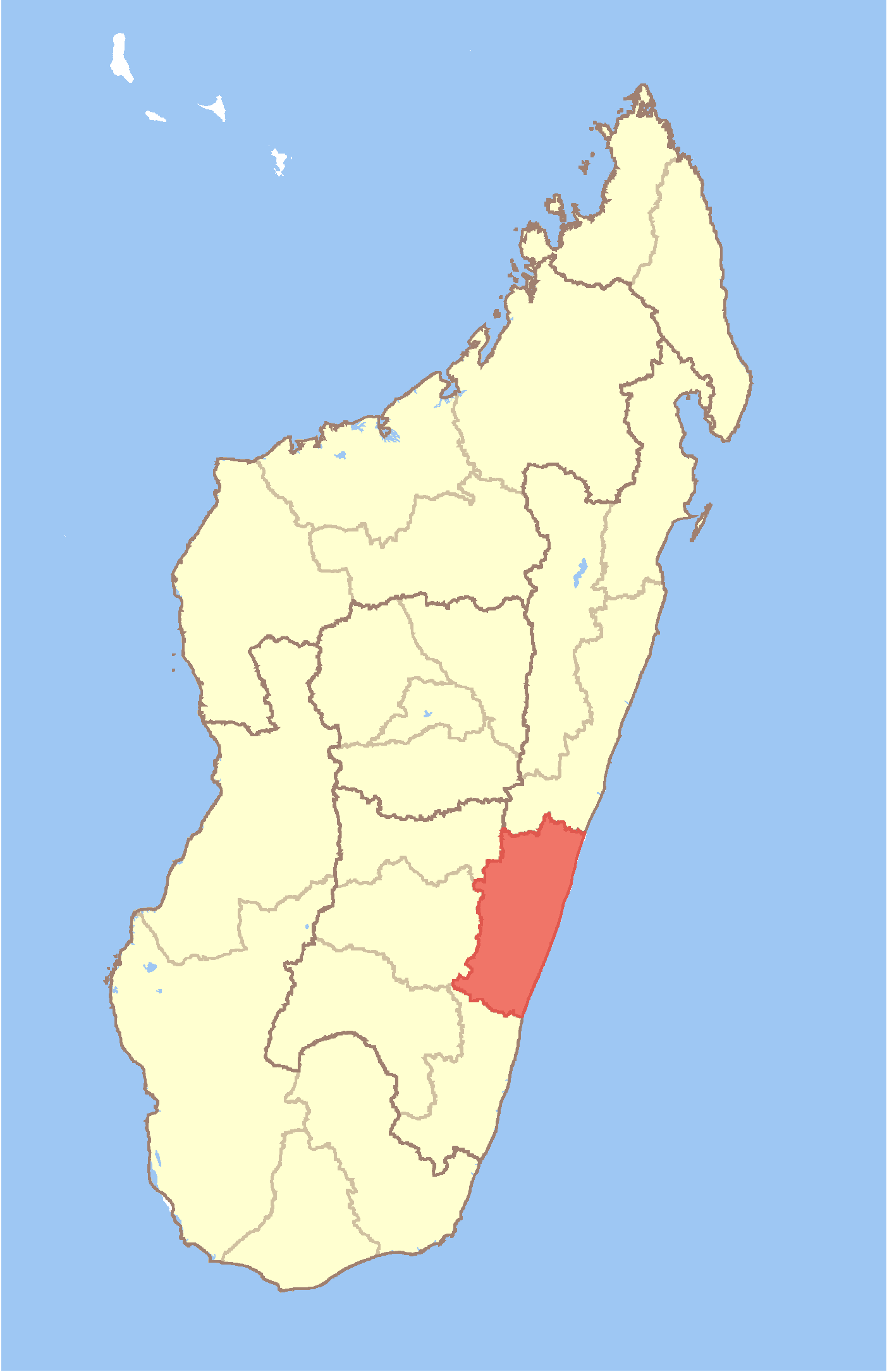
- Location in Madagascar

- Location within Madagascar
- Country: Madagascar
- Capital: Manakara

Area
  - Total: 19,605 km^{2} (7,570 sq mi)

Population (2018)
  - Total: 730,207
  - Density: 37.246/km^{2} (96.467/sq mi)
- Time zone: UTC3 (EAT)

Vatovavy-Fitovinany was a region of Madagascar from 2004 to 2021. Vatovavy-Fitovinany that was split on 16 June 2021 to become the regions Vatovavy and Fitovinany.

== Administrative divisions ==
Fitovinany Region was divided into six districts, which are sub-divided into 125 communes.

=== Districts ===
- Ifanadiana - 14 communes
- Ikongo - 17 communes
- Manakara-Atsimo - 42 communes
- Mananjary - 25 communes
- Nosy Varika - 19 communes
- Vohipeno - 17 communes
