= Tsiatosika =

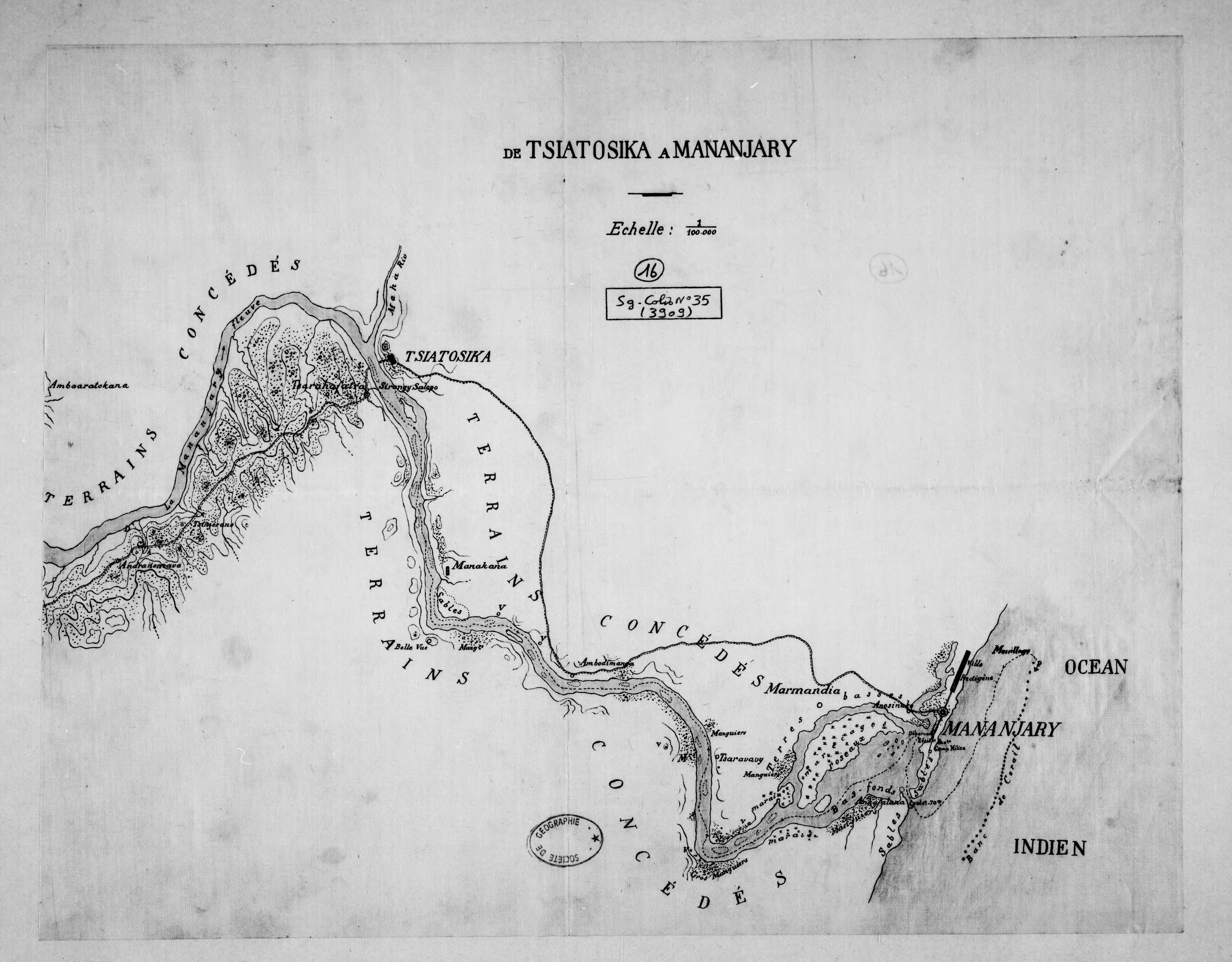

- Location in Madagascar
- Coordinates: 21°12′S 48°14′E
- Country: Madagascar
- Region: Vatovavy
- District: Mananjary

Area
  - Total: 195 km^{2} (75 sq mi)
- Elevation: 20 m (66 ft)

Population (2001)
  - Total: 24,000
- Time zone: UTC3 (EAT)
- Postal code: 317

Tsiatosika is a rural municipality in Madagascar. It belongs to the district of Mananjary, which is a part of Vatovavy. The population of the commune was estimated to be approximately 24,000 in 2001 commune census.

== Geography ==
This municipality is situated at 17 km west of Mananjary on the Mananjary River and at the intersection of the National Road 24 that leads from Vohilava, Mananjary to Mananjary and National Road 11 (Mananjary-Nosy Varika).

Only primary schooling is available. The majority 95.8% of the population of the commune are farmers. The most important crops are coffee and bananas; also rice is an important agricultural product. Services provide employment for 4.2% of the population.
