= Mananjary (disambiguation) =

Mananjary is the name of:

- Mananjary, a town in the region Vatovavy, Madagascar
- Mananjary River, in southern Madagascar
- Mananjary (district)
- Mananjary Airport
