= Tsaravary =

- Location in Madagascar
- Coordinates: 21°15′S 48°18′E
- Country: Madagascar
- Region: Vatovavy
- District: Mananjary
- Elevation: 11 m (36 ft)

Population (2001)
  - Total: 27,000
  - Ethnicities: Antambahoaka
- Time zone: UTC3 (EAT)
- Postal code: 317

Tsaravary is a rural municipality in Madagascar. It belongs to the district of Mananjary, which is a part of Vatovavy. The population of the commune was estimated to be approximately 27,000 in 2001 commune census.

== Geography ==
Tsaravary is situated at the Mananjary River, the National Road 25 and at 8km distance from Mananjary.

Only primary schooling is available. The majority 54% of the population of the commune are farmers. The most important crop is rice, while other important products are lychee, cassava and potatoes. Services provide employment for 1% of the population. Additionally fishing employs 45% of the population.
