= Antaimoro dialect =

Dialect of Malagasy

Antaimoro
- Zakan'Atemoro
- Native to: Madagascar
- Ethnicity: Antemoro people
- Native speakers: 1,327,000
- Language family: Austronesian: Malayo-Polynesian; Western Indonesian; Barito; East Barito; Central-Eastern Malagasic; Plateau Malagasy; Antaimoro
- Writing system: Latin script (Malagasy alphabet); Sorabe alphabet

Language codes
- ISO 639-1: mg
- ISO 639-3: plt
- Glottolog: anta1259
- Linguasphere: 31-LDA-bb
- Antemoro dialect – Namorona Two women from Namorona recount in the Antemoro dialect how, in a moment of desperation during a famine, people resorted to eating wild fruits that turned out to be poisonous. Antemoro dialect – Vohipeno A woman from Vohitrindry, Vohipeno thanking FID for its help to her and her children. Antemoro dialect – Manakara A dialogue on artificial intelligence in journalism, led by two Radio Madagascar journalists, delivered in the Antemoro dialect of Manakara.

Antaimoro or Antemoro is a dialect of Malagasy spoken by Antemoro people in the ex-region of Vatovavy-Fitovinany.

== Classification ==
Antemoro is part of the Austronesian language family, within the Central-Eastern Malagasic branch. It is further classified under the Plateaux Malagasy alongside Merina,Sihanaka, Antambahoaka and Antefasy.

== Geographical distribution ==
The Antemoro dialect is primarily spoken in the Fitovinany region of southeastern Madagascar, particularly in the districts of Manakara-Atsimo and Vohipeno. It is also spoken in the southern part of the neighboring Vatovavy region, including several communes such as Namorona, Sandrohy, and Vatohandrina.

== Characteristics ==
The Antemoro dialect is closely related to the Antaifasy dialect, with only minor phonological and lexical differences. One distinctive feature is the use of suffixes such as -tra and -gna in Antemoro, compared to variations like -gny in Antefasy. For example, the verb "to talk" is rendered as mikoragna in Antemoro, while in Antefasy it appears as mikoragny. Additionally, certain vocabulary items differ; for instance, the word for "sword" is sabatry in Antefasy and sabatra in Antemoro. Despite these differences, the dialects remain mutually intelligible to a high degree.

Lexical Comparison between Antefasy and Antemoro Dialects
Gloss	Antefasy	Antemoro
one	raiky	raika
I	iaho	iaho
me	anaha	anaha
we (inclusive)	atsika	atsika
we (exclusive)	ihay / ahay	ihay / ahay
they/them	indreo	indreo
only	avao	avao
also	koa	koza
all	aby/rehetra	aby/rehetra
to tell	mizaka / mitantara	mizaka / mitantara
above	ambony	ambony
now	amizao	amizao
dear	ingaha	ingahy
the / that	gne / e	gny
even	ndre	ndre
even if	ndre da	ndre da

== Vocabulary ==
=== Numerals ===
English	Standard Malagasy	Antaimoro
One	Iray/Isa	Raika/Isa
Two	Roa	Roa
Three	Telo	Telo
Four	Efatra	Efatra
Five	Dimy	Dimy
Six	Enina	Enina
Seven	Fito	Fito
Eight	Valo	Valo
Nine	Sivy	Sivy
Ten	Folo	Folo
Hundred	Zato	Zato
Thousand	Arivo	Arivo
Ten thousand	Iray halina	Ray haligny
One hundred thousand	Iray hetsy	Ray hetsy
One million	Tapitrisa	Tapitrisa

=== Animals ===
English	Standard Malagasy	Antaimoro
Animal	Biby	Biby
Bird	Vorona	Vorogny
Duck	Ganagana	Ganagana
Chicken	Akoho	Akoho
Goose	Gisa	Gisa
Cow	Omby	Aomby
Sheep	Ondry	Ondry

=== Direction ===
English	Standard Malagasy	Antaimoro
North	Avaratra	Avaratry
South	Atsimo	Atsimo
East	Atsinanana	Atsignanagna
West	Andrefana	Andrefagna

=== Time ===
English	Standard Malagasy	Antaimoro
Day	Andro	Andro
Today	Anio/Androany	Androany
Yesterday	Omaly	Omaly
Tomorrow	Rahampitso	Omaray/Ampitso
Month	Volana	Volagna
Year	Taona	Taogna

== Writing System ==
The Antemoro dialect is one of the Malagasy varieties that were historically written using the Arabic-derived Arabico-Malagasy script, alongside that of the Antambahoaka and Tanosy. This script, known as *Sorabe* ("large writings"), was primarily used for magical and divinatory purposes.

In the early 19th century, during the reign of King Andrianampoinimerina (c. 1800–1804), two Taimoro sages from the southeast, Andriamahazonoro (d. 1838) and Ratsilikaina, were summoned to the Merina capital to inaugurate a royal palace school. By 1817, they had introduced the Sorabe script to five or six royal children, including the future king Radama I.

Before ultimately deciding to adopt the Latin alphabet for the translation of the Bible, the first English Protestant missionaries in Madagascar considered using the Arabico-Malagasy orthography of the Taimoro people. They studied the script and discussed this possibility with King Radama I, before jointly opting for the Latin alphabet as the basis of the new standardized writing system.

== See also ==
Kalamo tetsitesy, an Arabic based pigdin used in Antemoro community
