= Andriamamovoka Falls =

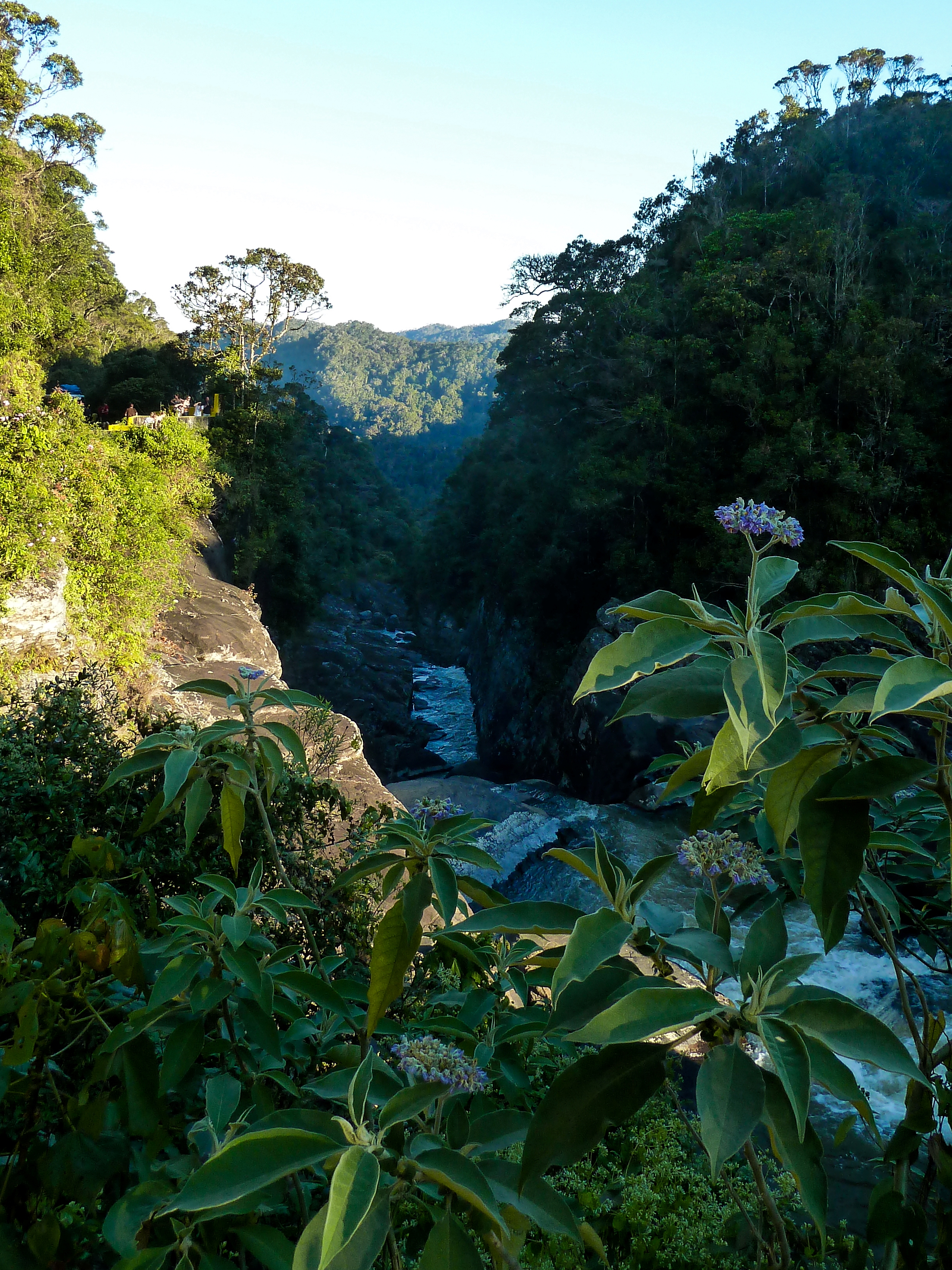
- View of Andriamamovoka Falls

- Location within Madagascar
- Location: Ranomafana, Madagascar
- Coordinates: 21°15′15″S 47°25′18″E
- Watercourse: Namorona River

The Andriamamovoka Falls is a waterfall in central Madagascar.

It is situated on the Namorona River in the Vatovavy region, near Ranomafana National Park.

== See also ==
- List of waterfalls
