= Irondro =

- Location in Madagascar
- Coordinates: 21°24′0″S 47°59′0″E
- Country: Madagascar
- Region: Vatovavy
- District: Mananjary

Area
  - Total: 29.1 km^{2} (11.2 sq mi)
- Postal code: 317

Irondro is a village in the region of Vatovavy in Madagascar. It belongs to the municipality of Antsenavolo and the district of Mananjary/ It is situated at the crossroad of the Route nationale 25 between Ranomafana, Ifanadiana and Mananjary and is the startpoint of the Route nationale 12 to Manakara (118km) and Farafangana.

== Mining ==
There are some mining operations on emeralds since the 1970th.
