= Route nationale 11 (Madagascar) =

Road in Madagascar

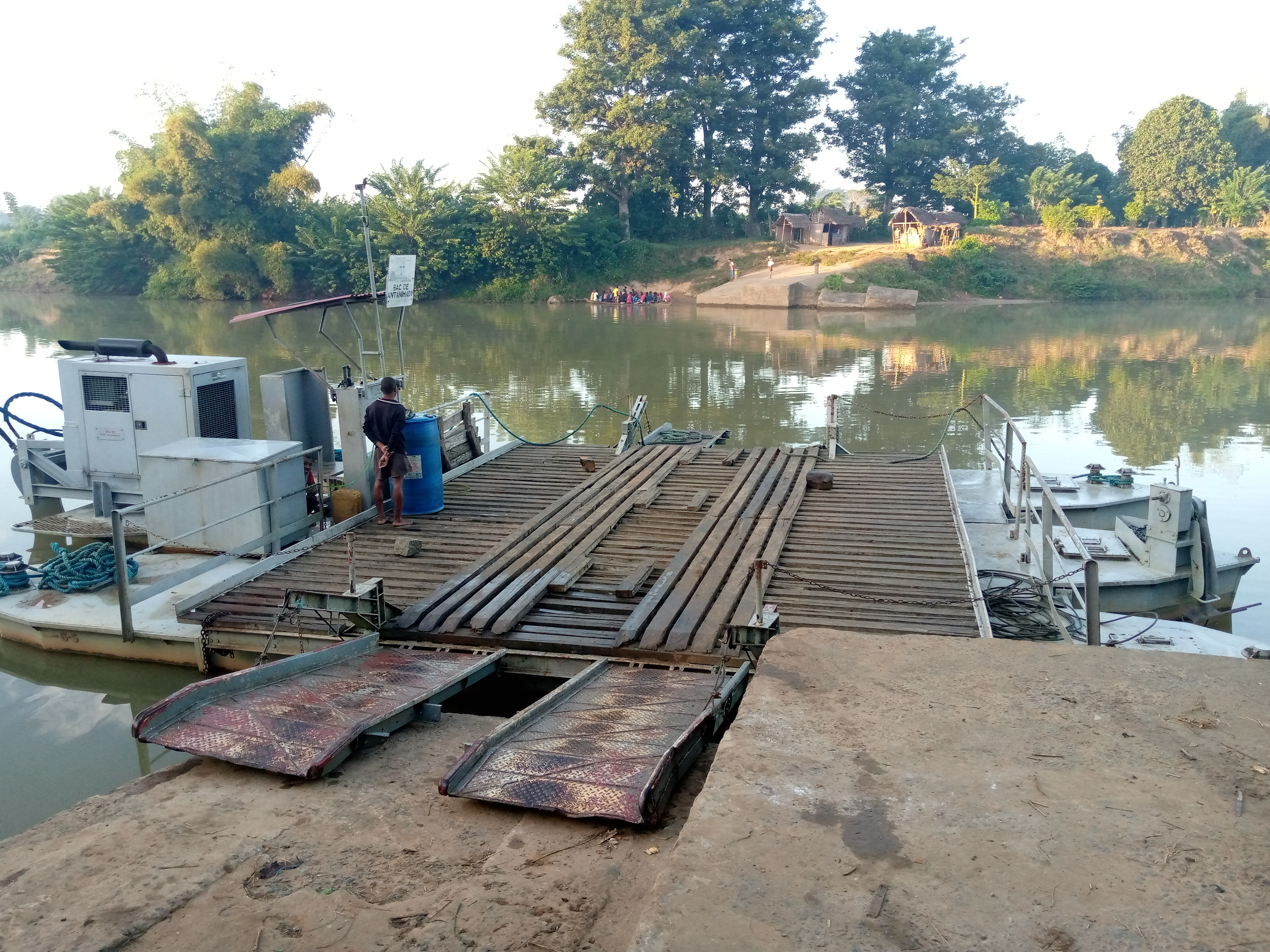

Location
- Country: Madagascar

Highway system
- Roads in Madagascar

Route nationale 11 (RN 11) is a secondary highway in Madagascar of 204 km, running from Mahanoro to Mananjary. It crosses the regions of Atsinanana and Vatovavy.

== Selected locations on route ==
(north to south)

- RN 11a from Mahanoro
- Nosy Varika - 204 km
- Tsiatosika - intersection with RN 24
- Betampona
- intersection with RN 25
- Mananjary

== See also ==
- List of roads in Madagascar
- Transport in Madagascar
