= Anosimparihy =

- Location in Madagascar
- Coordinates: 21°30′S 47°59′E
- Country: Madagascar
- Region: Vatovavy
- District: Mananjary
- Elevation: 65 m (213 ft)

Population (2001)
  - Total: 10,000
- Time zone: UTC3 (EAT)
- Postal code: 317

Anosimparihy is a rural municipality in Madagascar. It belongs to the district of Mananjary, which is a part of Vatovavy. The population of the commune was estimated to be approximately 10,000 in 2001 commune census.

== Geography ==
It is situated at the Namorona River.

Only primary schooling is available. The majority (98%) of the population of the commune are farmers. The most important crops are rice and bananas, while other important agricultural products are avocado, coffee and lychee. Services provide employment for 2% of the population.
