= Kianjavato =

- Location in Madagascar
- Coordinates: 21°22′S 47°52′E
- Country: Madagascar
- Region: Vatovavy
- District: Mananjary
- Elevation: 193 m (633 ft)

Population (2001)
  - Total: 5,000
- Time zone: UTC3 (EAT)
- Postal code: 317

Kianjavato is a rural municipality in Madagascar. It belongs to the district of Mananjary, which is a part of Vatovavy. The population of the commune was estimated to be approximately 5,000 in 2001 commune census.

Primary and junior level secondary education are available in town. The majority 99.5% of the population of the commune are farmers. The most important crops are bananas and rice; also coffee is an important agricultural product. Services provide employment for 0.5% of the population.

Kianjavato is situated alongside the National Road 25 that leads from Fianarantsoa to Mananjary.

Kianjavato has multiple forest fragments that support nine lemur species, including the endangered Aye-Aye and critically endangered Greater Bamboo Lemur. Since 2008 the Madagascar Biodiversity Project has planted nearly 4 million trees to reconnect forest fragments. The group operates the Kianjavato Ahmanson Field Station, where it conducts research and local outreach.
