= Antsenavolo =

- Location in Madagascar
- Coordinates: 21°24′S 48°3′E
- Country: Madagascar
- Region: Vatovavy
- District: Mananjary
- Elevation: 162 m (531 ft)

Population (2001)
  - Total: 16,000
- Time zone: UTC3 (EAT)
- Postal code: 317

Antsenavolo is a rural municipality in Madagascar. It belongs to the district of Mananjary, which is a part of Vatovavy. The population of the municipality was estimated to be approximately 16,000 in 2001 commune census.

Primary and junior level secondary education are available in town. The majority 95% of the population of the commune are farmers. The most important crops are coffee and rice; also bananas is an important agricultural product. Services provide employment for 5% of the population.

== See also ==
- Irondro, a village of this municipality.
