= Mahatsara Iefaka =

- Location within Madagascar
- Coordinates: 21°07′S 48°20′E
- Country: Madagascar
- Region: Vatovavy
- District: Mananjary

Population (2001)
  - Total: 5,000
- Time zone: UTC3 (EAT)
- Postal code: 317

Mahatsara Iefaka is a rural municipality in Madagascar. It belongs to the district of Mananjary, which is a part of Vatovavy. The population of the commune was estimated to be approximately 5,000 in 2001 commune census.

Only primary schooling is available. The majority 99% of the population of the commune are farmers. The most important crop is rice, while other important products are coffee and cassava. Services provide employment for 1% of the population.
