= Mahatsara Sud =

Mahatsara Sud Mahatsara Atsimo
- Location within Madagascar
- Coordinates: 21°09′S 48°18′E
- Country: Madagascar
- Region: Vatovavy
- District: Mananjary

Population (2001)
  - Total: 2,000
- Time zone: UTC3 (EAT)
- Postal code: 317

Mahatsara Sud is a rural municipality in Madagascar. It belongs to the district of Mananjary, which is a part of Vatovavy. The population of the commune was estimated to be approximately 2,000 in 2001 commune census.

Only primary schooling is available. The majority 99.5% of the population of the commune are farmers. The most important crops are cassava and rice, while other important agricultural products are coffee and lychee. Services provide employment for 0.5% of the population.
