= Ambohinihaonana =

- Location in Madagascar
- Coordinates: 21°12′S 47°55′E
- Country: Madagascar
- Region: Vatovavy
- District: Mananjary
- Elevation: 88 m (289 ft)

Population (2018)
  - Total: 10,697
- Time zone: UTC3 (EAT)
- Postal code: 317

Ambohinihaonana is a rural municipality Madagascar. It belongs to the district of Mananjary, which is a part of the region of Vatovavy. The population of this municipality was 10697 in 2018.

Only primary schooling is available. The majority 99.5% of the population of the commune are farmers. The most important crop is rice, while other important products are bananas and coffee. Services provide employment for 0.5% of the population.

This place is not served by a road, it is only accessible by boat or by foot.
