= Ranomafana, Ifanadiana =

Ranomafana
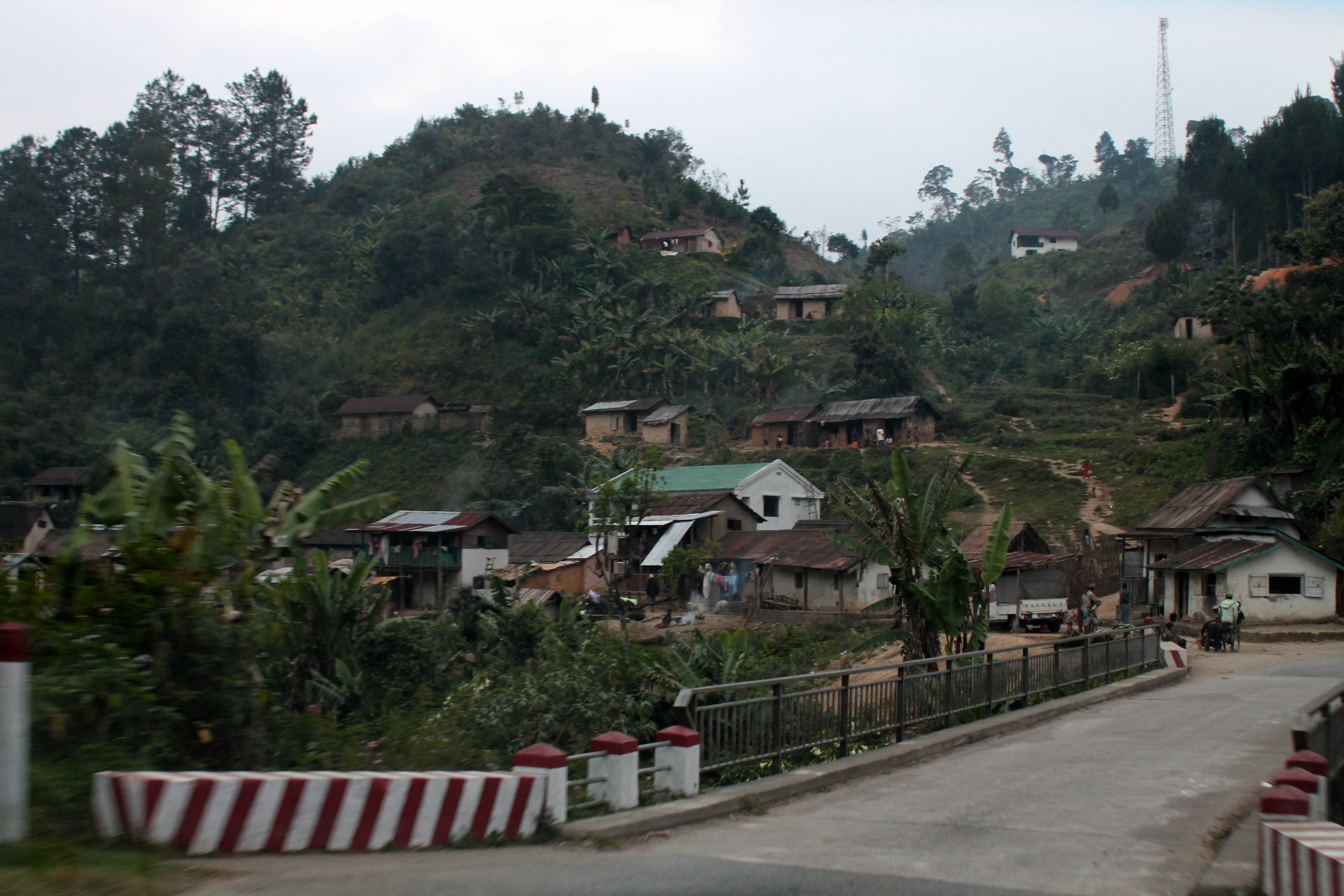
- Ranomafana

- Location in Madagascar
- Coordinates: 21°15′S 47°27′E
- Country: Madagascar
- Region: Vatovavy
- District: Ifanadiana

Area
  - Total: 245 km^{2} (95 sq mi)
- Elevation: 876 m (2,874 ft)

Population (2018)
  - Total: 9,705
- Time zone: UTC3 (EAT)
- Postal code: 312

Ranomafana is a rural municipality in Madagascar. It belongs to the district of Ifanadiana, which is a part of the region of Vatovavy. The population of the commune was 9,705 in the 2018.

Primary and junior level secondary education are available in the town. 60% of the population of the commune are farmers; the most important crops are bananas and rice, while other important agricultural products are pineapple and cassava. Services provide employment for 40% of the population.

== Roads ==
The commune is situated at 62 km from Fianarantsoa and 138 km from Mananjary along the National Road 25.

== Rivers ==
The municipality is crossed by the Namorona River. There are also the Andriamamovoka Falls, a waterfall on the Namorona near the fokontany of Vohiparara.

== Sights and infrastructure ==
There is an outdoor swimming pool and bath filled by hot water springs. A well-kept park can be visited close to the outdoor pool. A number of hotels are found throughout the village, accommodating tourist that come to visit the nearby Ranomafana National Park. Ranomafana has a hospital. The Town Hall (Lapan'ny tanana) is on the main road. The Post Office and the Market are at Place de l'Indépendance where a memorial dedicated to the victims of the Malagasy Uprising of 1947 was erected. The Catholic Church was consecrated by bishop François Xavier Tabao Manjarimanana in 1988.

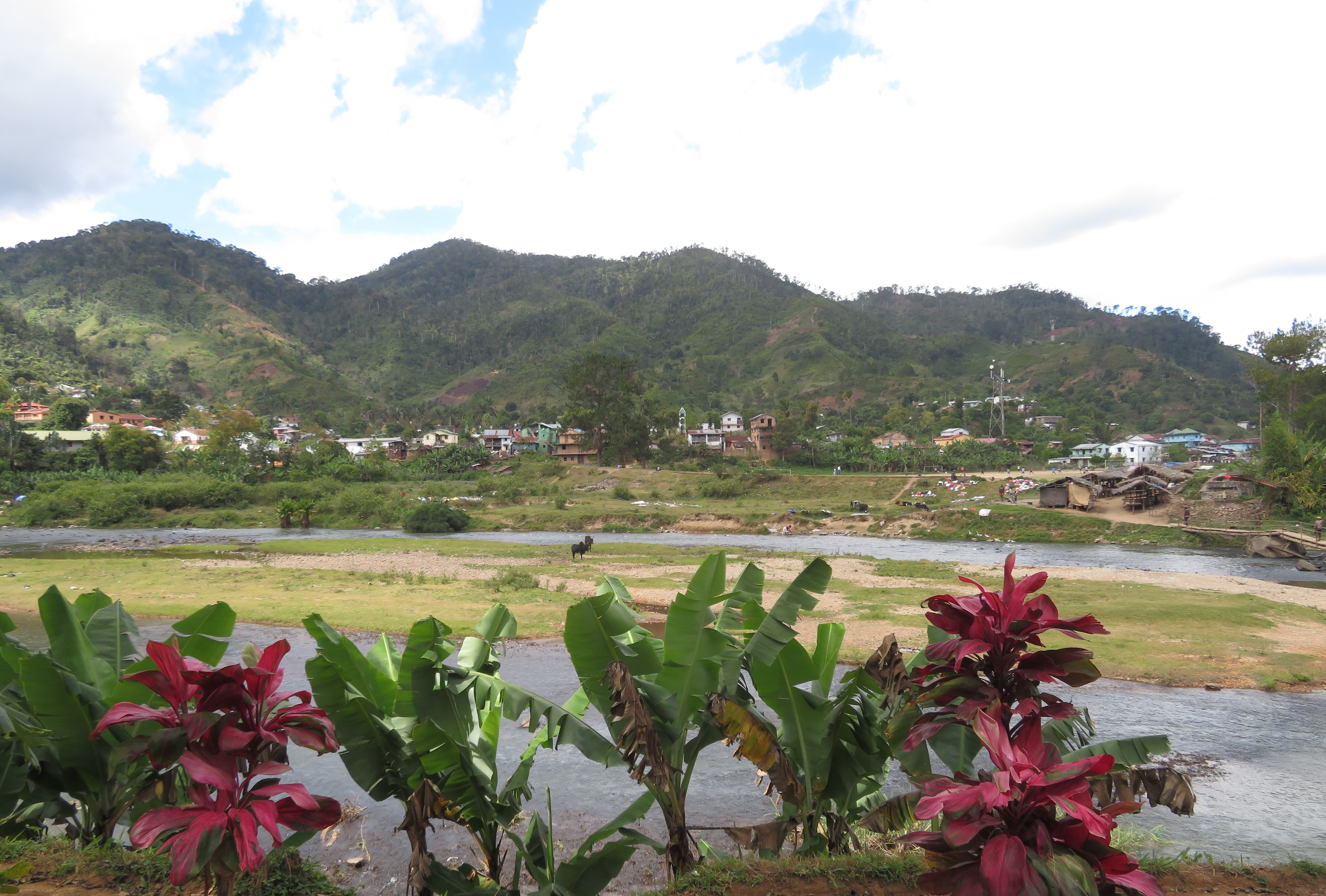
General view of Ranomafana

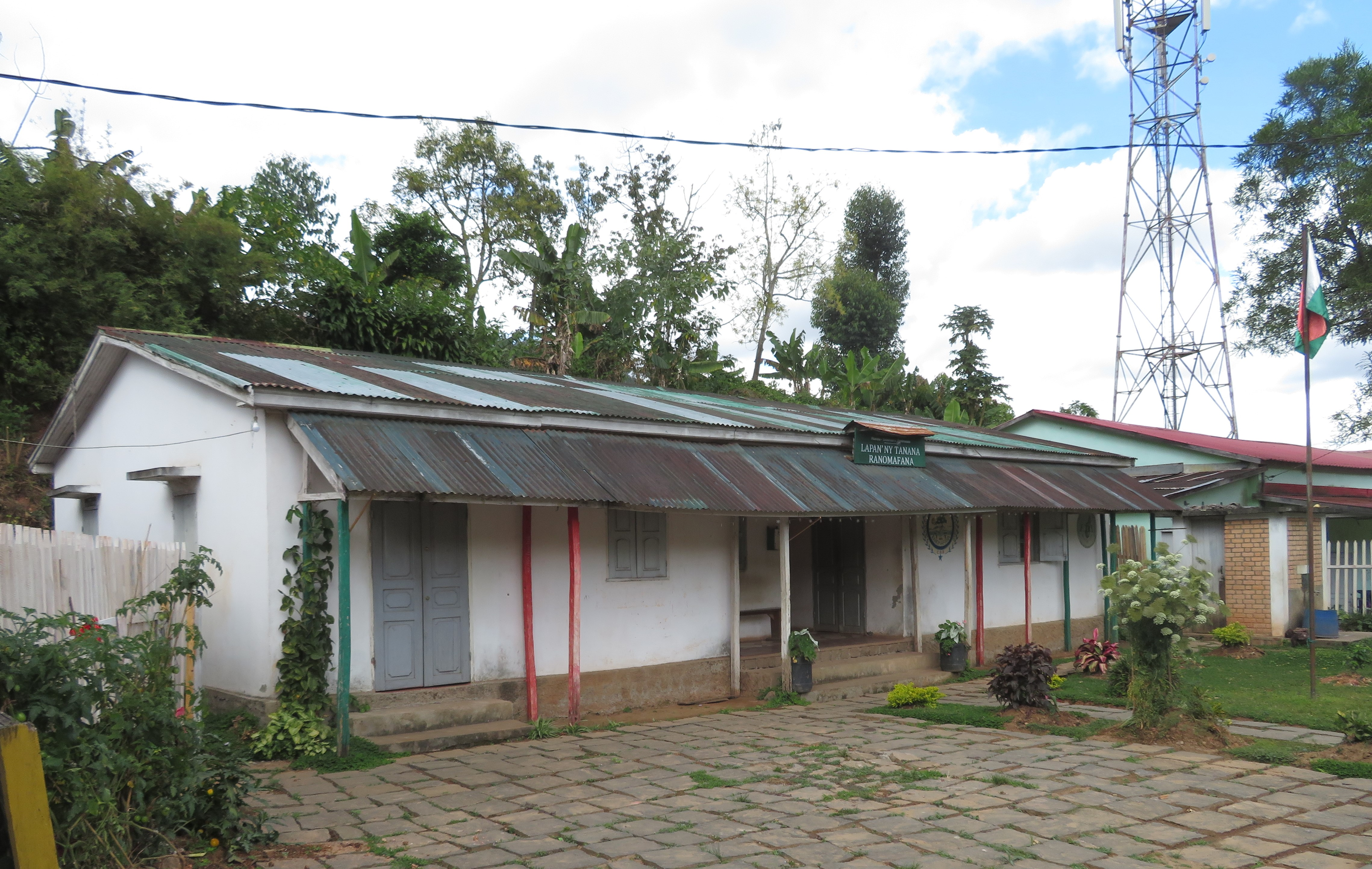
Town Hall

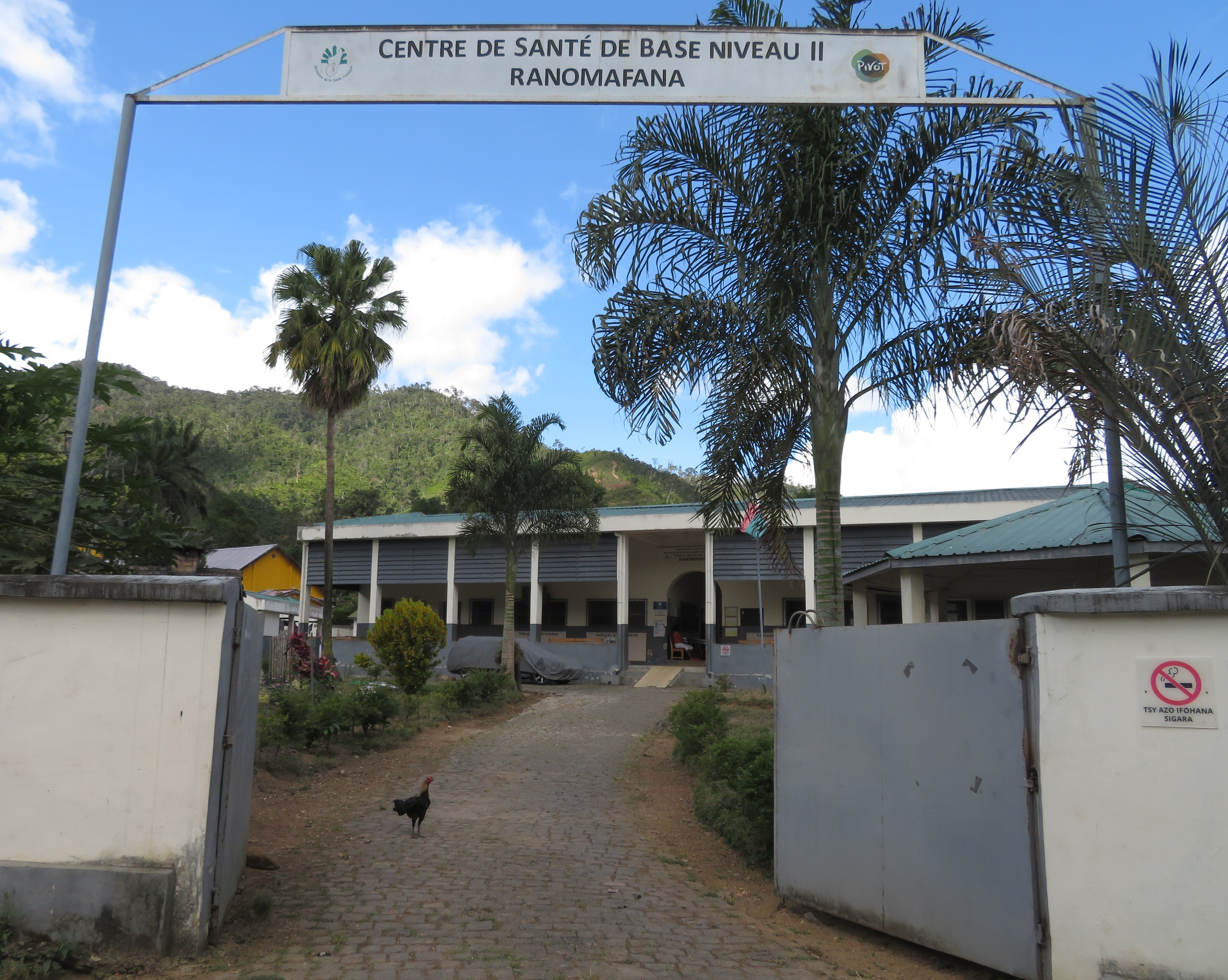
Hospital

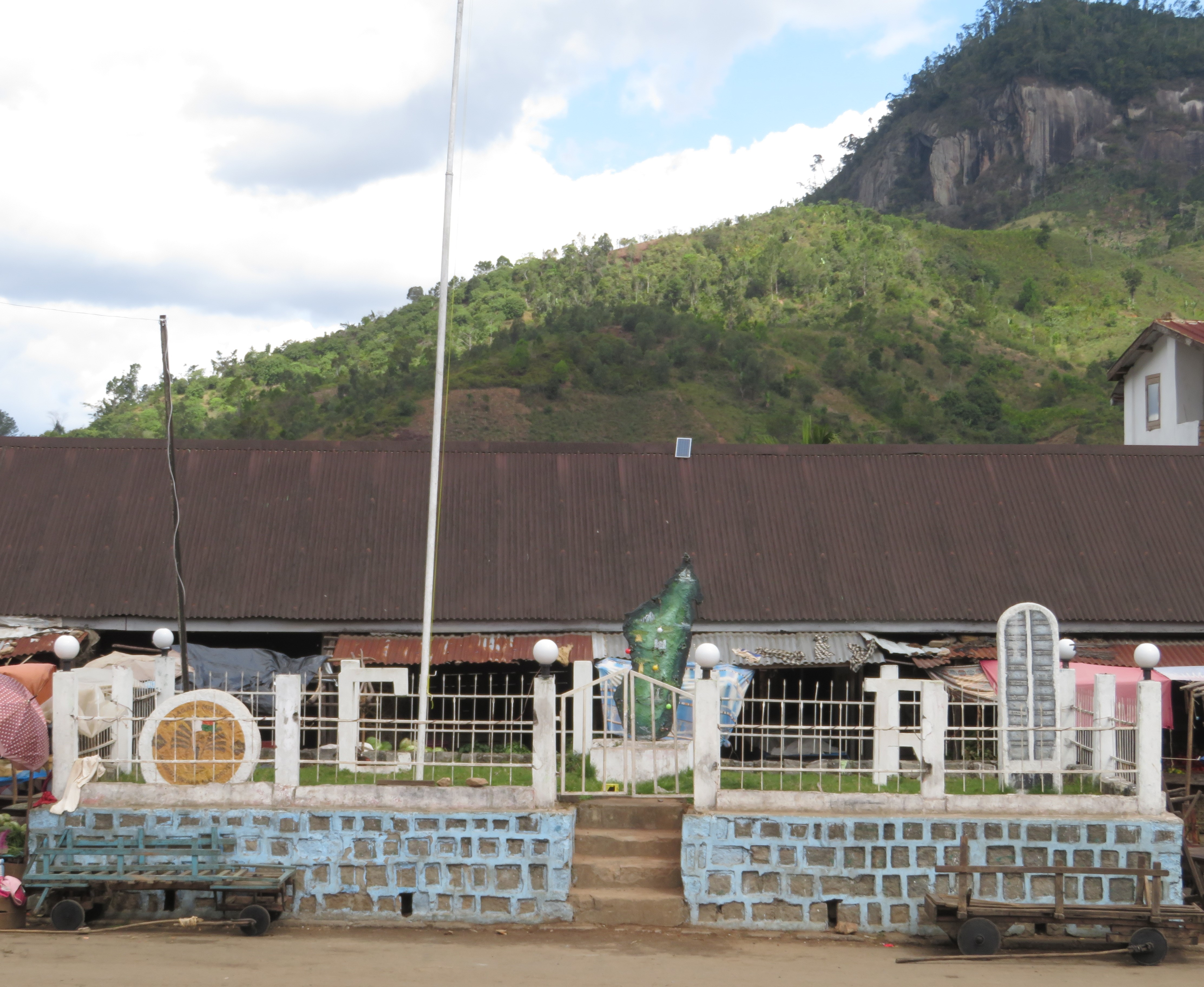
Monument

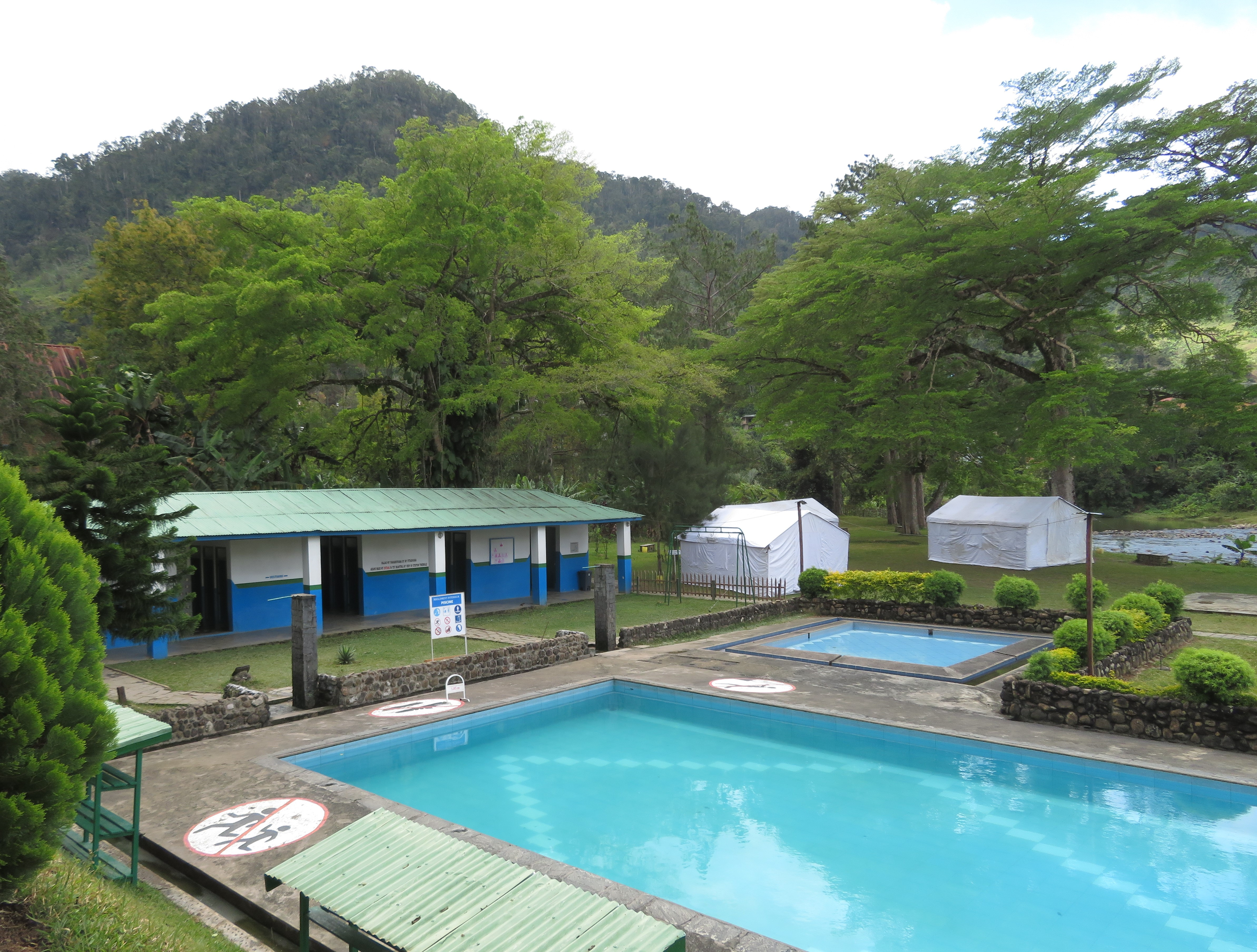
Public pool

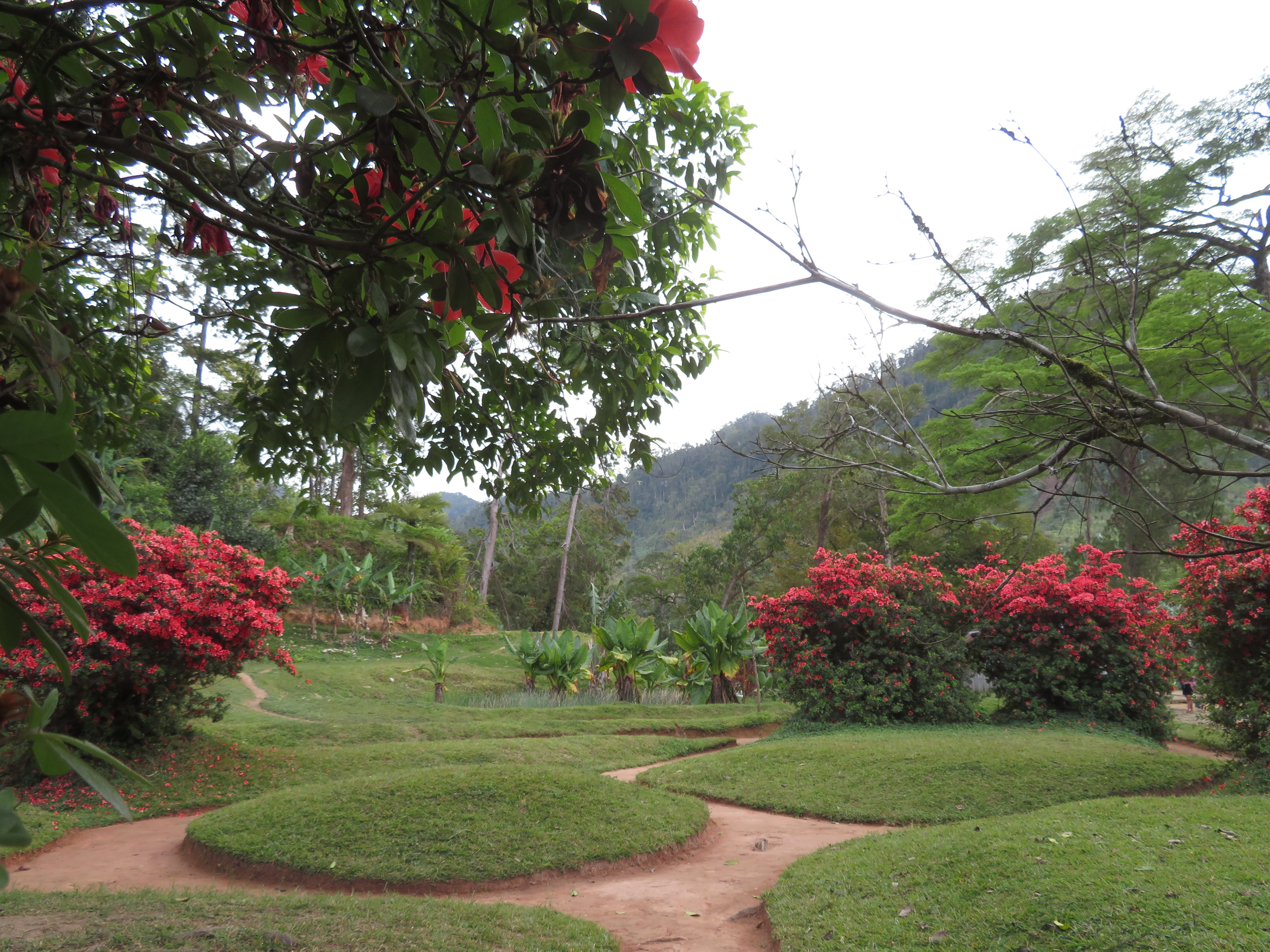
Public parc near the hot springs

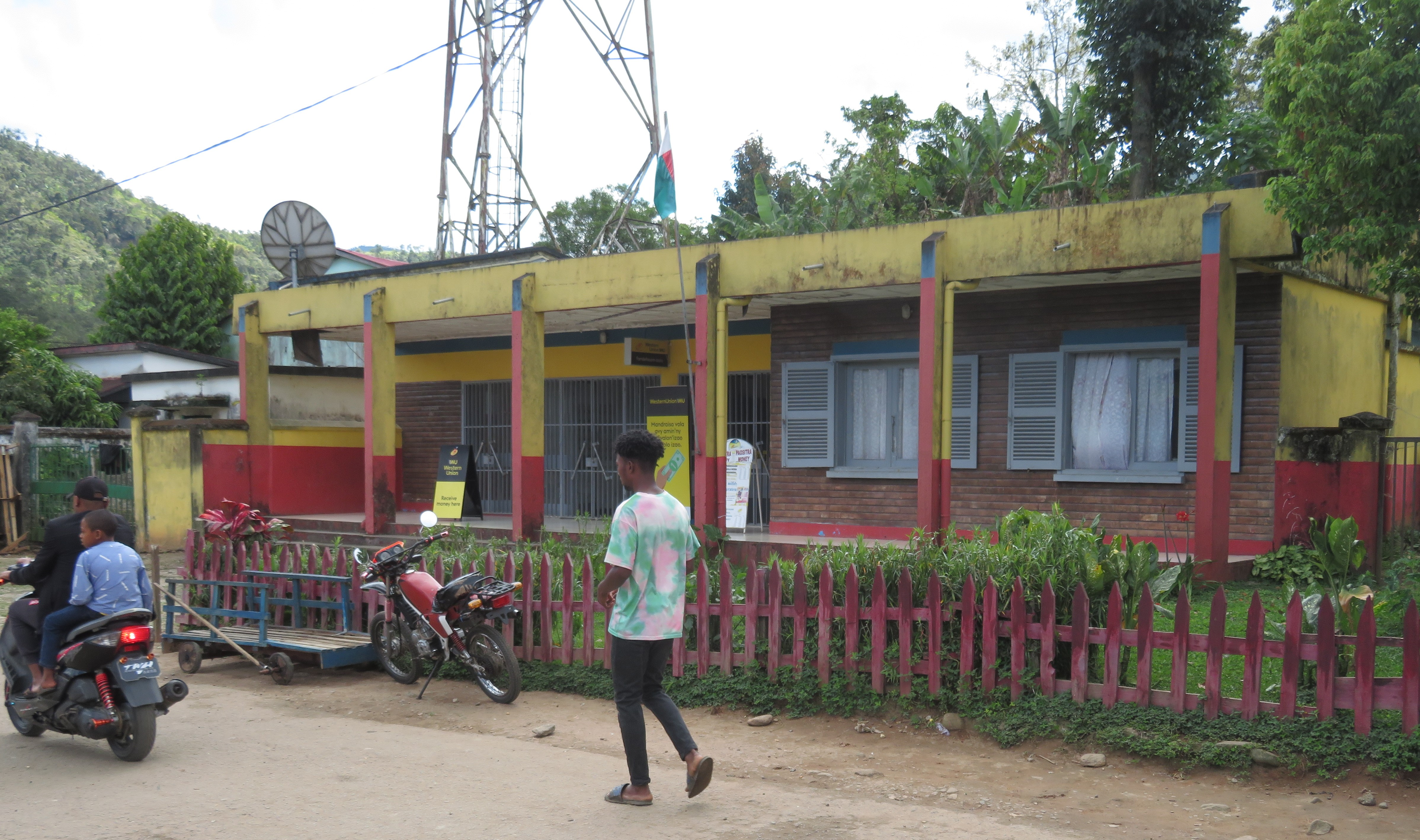
Post office

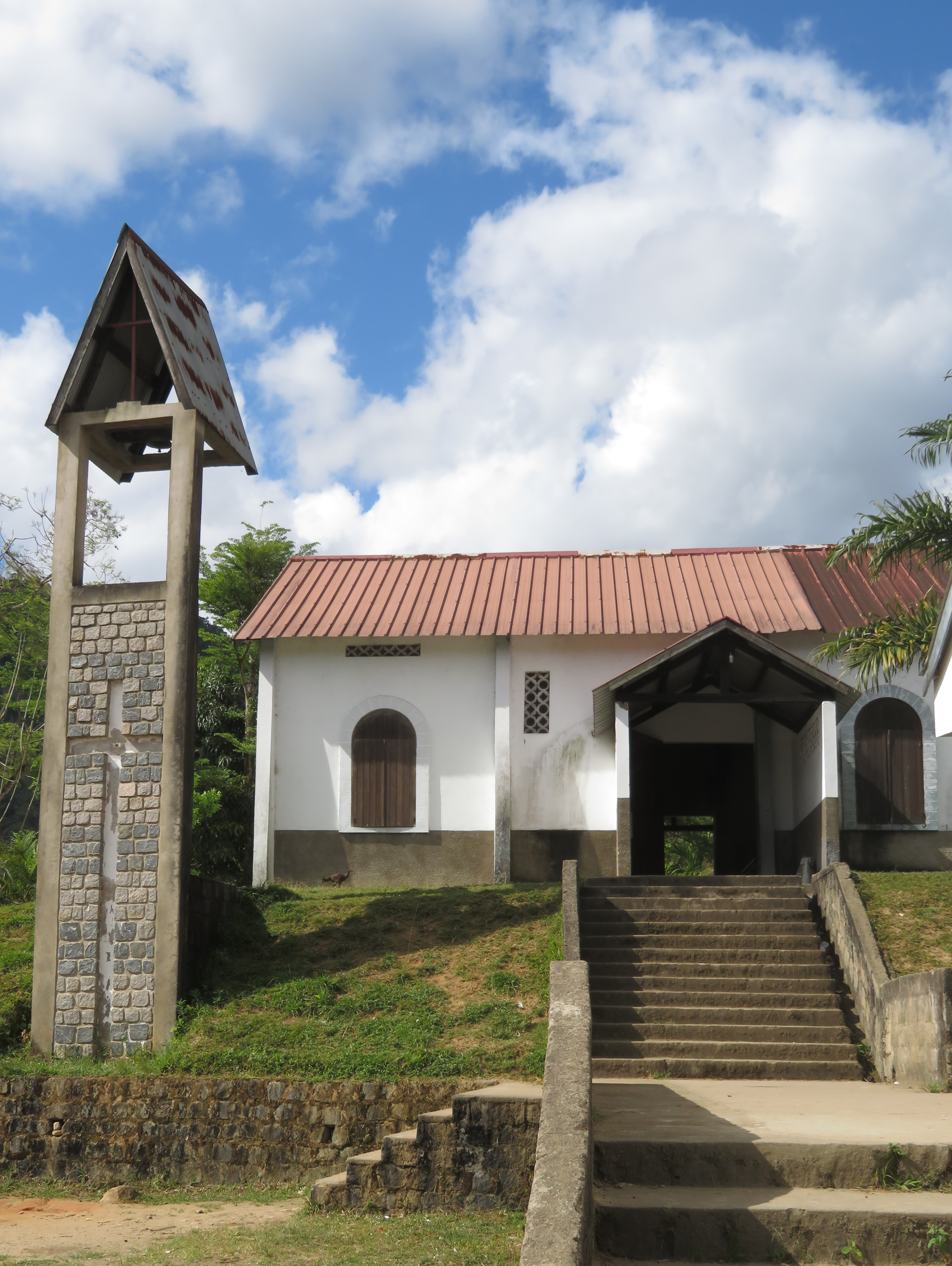
Catholic church

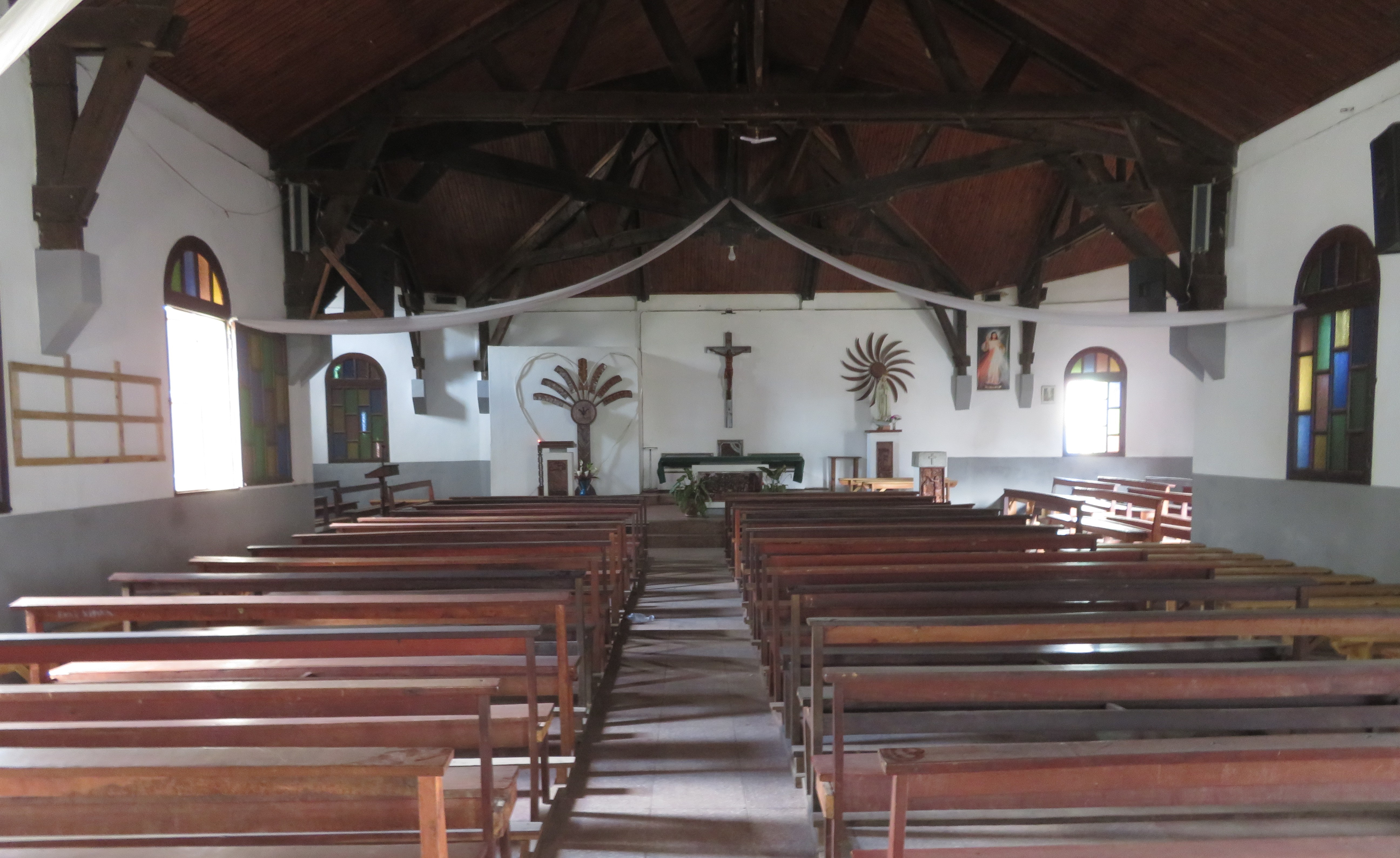
Catholic church

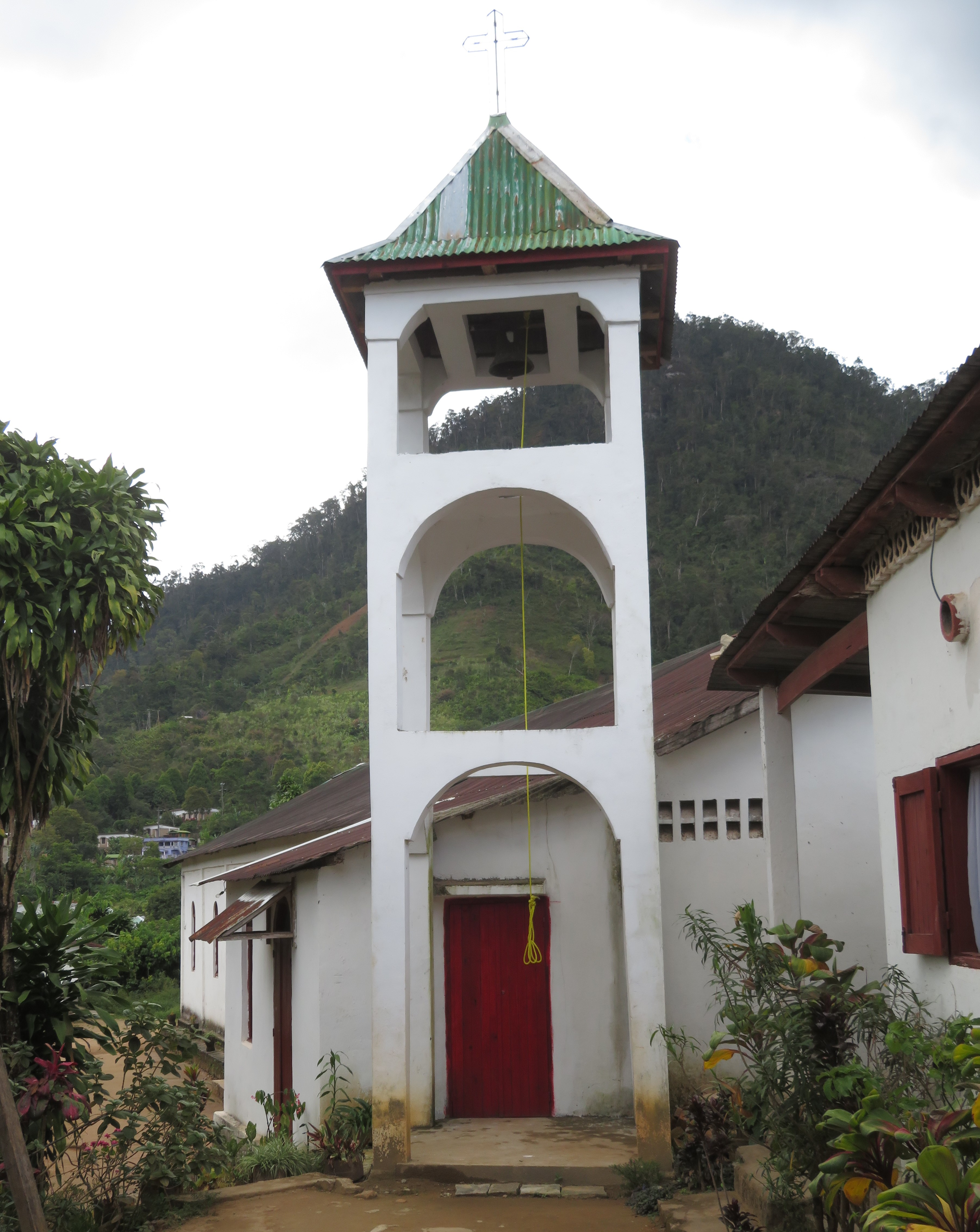
Protestant Church

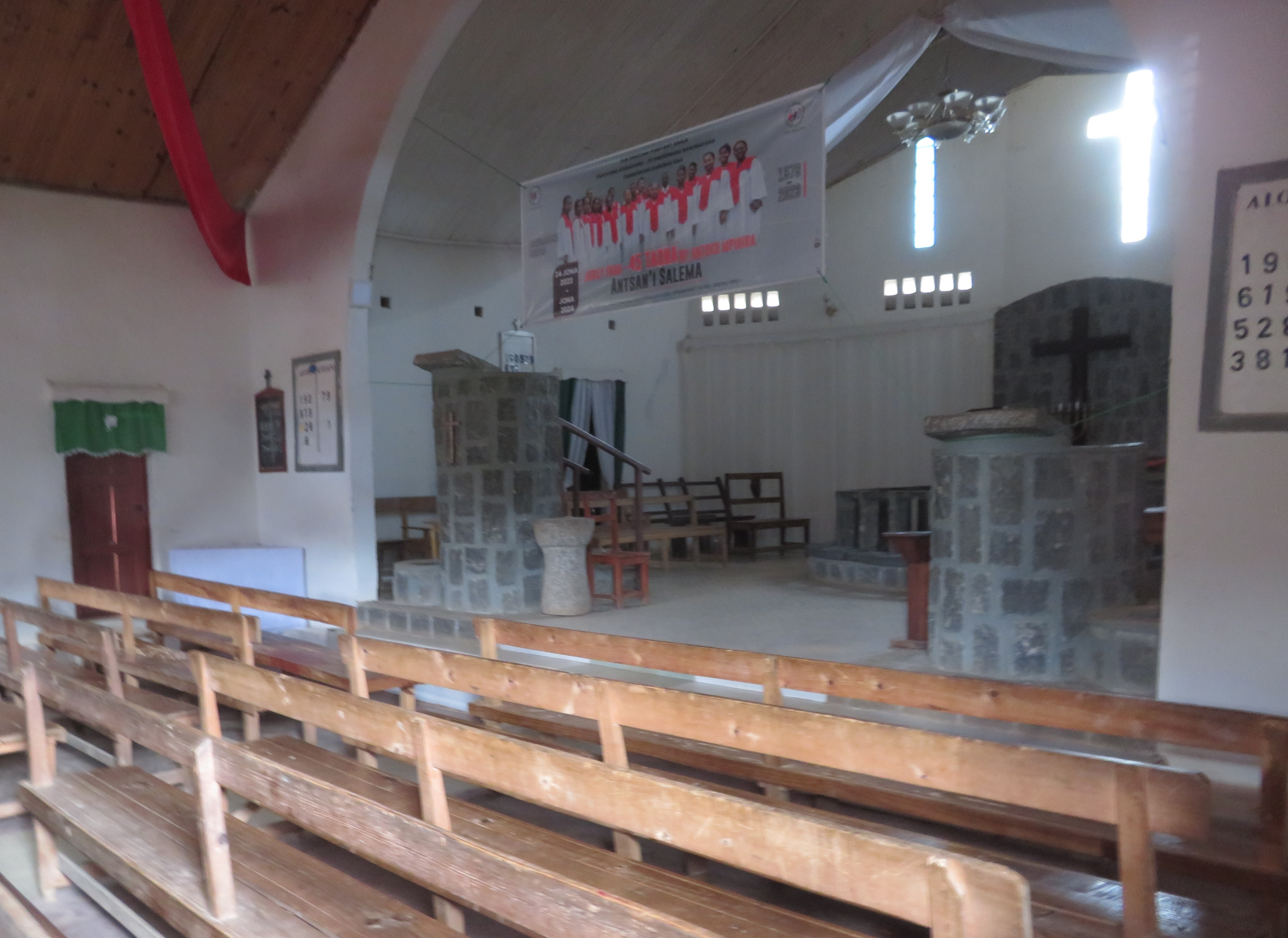
Protestant Church

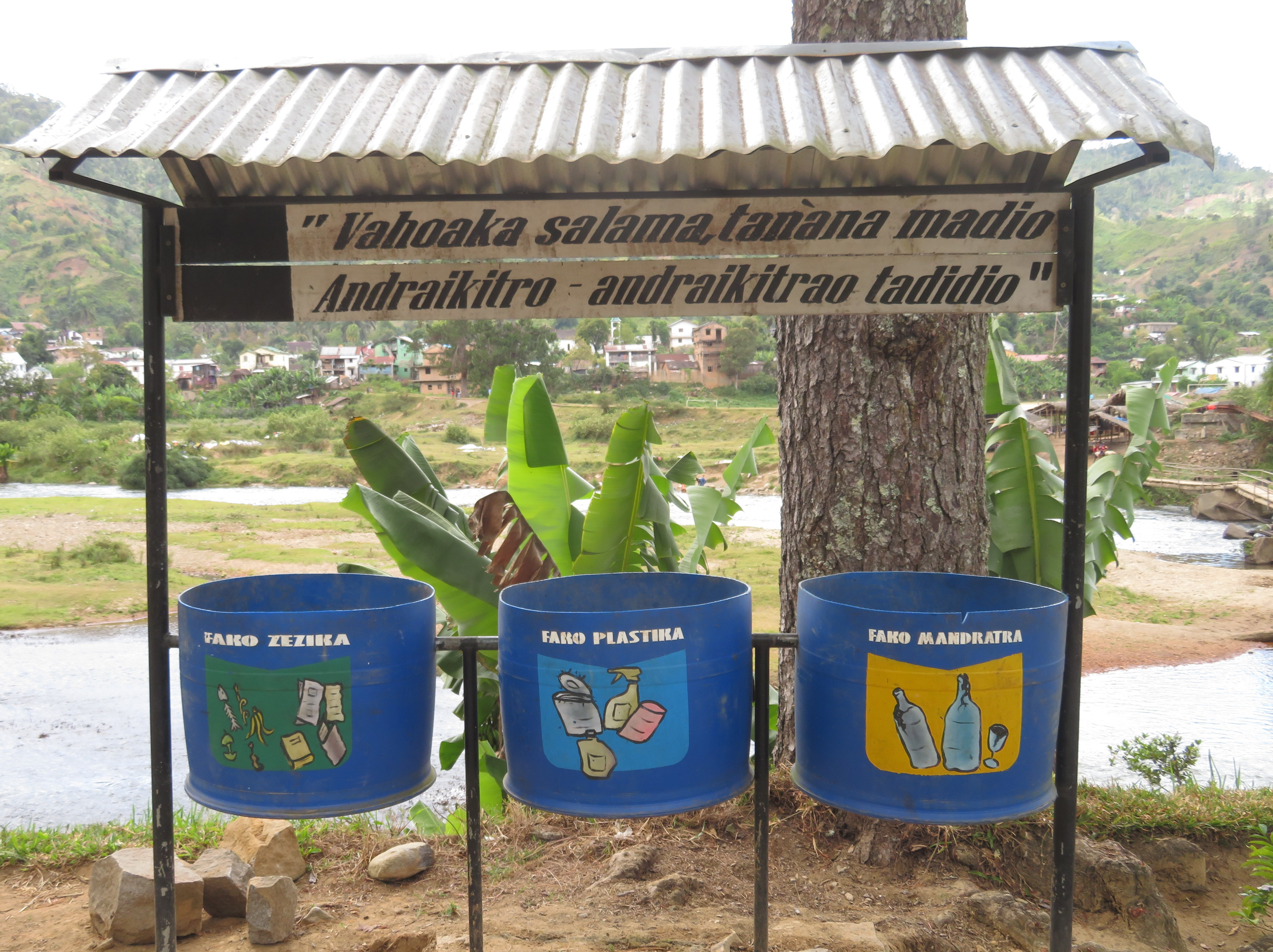
Campaign to keep the town clean

== See also ==
- Ranomafana National Park at 6.5 km from Ranomafana.
