= Marokarima =

- Location in Madagascar
- Coordinates: 21°13′S 48°8′E
- Country: Madagascar
- Region: Vatovavy-Fitovinany
- District: Mananjary
- Elevation: 25 m (82 ft)

Population (2001)
  - Total: 14,000
- Time zone: UTC3 (EAT)

Marokarima is a town and commune in Madagascar. It belongs to the district of Mananjary, which is a part of the région Vatovavy. The population of the commune was estimated to be approximately 14,000 in 2001 commune census.

The majority 99.5% of the population of the commune are farmers. The most important crops are coffee and bananas; also sugarcane is an important agricultural product. Services provide employment for 0.5% of the population.
