= Ambohimiarina II =

- Location in Madagascar
- Coordinates: 21°20′S 48°0′E
- Country: Madagascar
- Region: Vatovavy-Fitovinany
- District: Mananjary
- Elevation: 39 m (128 ft)

Population (2001)
  - Total: 3,000
- Time zone: UTC3 (EAT)

Ambohimiarina II is a town and commune in Madagascar. It belongs to the district of Mananjary, which is a part of Vatovavy-Fitovinany Region. The population of the commune was estimated to be approximately 3,000 in 2001 commune census.

Only primary schooling is available. The majority (99.5%) of the population of the commune are farmers. The most important crops are coffee and rice. Bananas are also an important agricultural product. Services provide employment for 0.5% of the population.
