= Kalamo tetsitesy =

Arabic-based pidgin and argot

- Region: Madagascar
- Language family: Arabic-based pigdin: Kalamo tetsitesy

Language codes
- ISO 639-3: None (mis)
- Glottolog: None

Kalamo tetsitesy is an Arabic-based pidgin and argot used in southeastern Madagascar among the Antemoro especially from the Añakara clan. It is the only non-Austronesian language used by an indigenous Malagasy community, primarily in written form for charms and ritual purposes.

== Characteristics ==
The syntax of Kalamo tetsitesy is Malagasy, while approximately three quarters of its vocabulary is of Arabic origin, not transmitted through Swahili. The language also incorporates some Swahili and Persian loanwords, as well as neologisms formed from Malagasy. Its use is traditionally associated with secrecy and social distinction, allowing speakers to communicate without being understood by other Malagasy groups. It also serves as a symbolic sign of caste and learned status.

== Usage ==
Kalamo tetsitesy is used not only by the Añakara themselves but also by scribes from other noble groups when secrecy is required. Several levels of language can be distinguished. A common variety, with a relatively limited vocabulary, is spoken in daily life in places such as Vatomasina and is used by men and women alike, including younger speakers. A more elaborate register, with a richer vocabulary, is known only to the most learned scribes, who partly draw on small Arabic–Malagasy lexicons preserved in certain sorabe manuscripts.

Transmission of Kalamo tetsitesy therefore occurs through both oral and written means. In manuscript traditions, scribes frequently employ this secret pidgin to give the titles of charms and ritual texts, such as añazimantsy lañadovy ('charm to kill enemies') or hirizy lohomay ('charm against fever'), reinforcing its role in esoteric and ritual practices.

== Vocabulary ==
Comparative Vocabulary of Arabic, Kalamo tetsitetsy, and Standard Malagasy
#	Gloss	Arabic	Kalamo tetsitesy	Standard Malagasy
1	evil	شَرّ (sharr)	siry	ratsy
2	bird	طُيور (ṭuyūr)	tozoro	vorona
3	water	ماء (al-māʾ)	alimao	rano
4	festival	عيد (ʿīd)	hidy	fety
5	chest	صَدْر (ṣadr)	sodory	tratrà
6	cloud	سَحاب (saḥāb)	sihabo	rahona
7	book	كِتاب (kitāb)	kitsabo	boky
8	cooking	الطَّبخ (aṭ-ṭabkh)	dobiko	fandrahoan-tsakafo
9	full	مملوء (mamluʾ)	namolo	feno
10	numerous	كثير (kathīr)	kasira	maro
11	prayer	صلاة (ṣalāh)	tsoalà	vavaka
12	necklace	قلائد (qalāʾid)	kalito	rojo
13	fast	سريع (sarīʿ)	saria	haingana
14	sky	سَماء (samāʾ)	tsamay	lanitra

== See also ==
- Antemoro language
- Malagasy language
