= Mahavoky Nord =

- Location in Madagascar
- Coordinates: 20°50′S 48°18′E
- Country: Madagascar
- Region: Vatovavy-Fitovinany
- District: Mananjary
- Elevation: 40 m (130 ft)

Population (2001)
  - Total: 6,000
- Time zone: UTC3 (EAT)

Mahavoky Nord is a town and commune in Madagascar. It belongs to the district of Mananjary, which is a part of Vatovavy-Fitovinany Region. The population of the commune was estimated to be approximately 6,000 in 2001 commune census.

Only primary schooling is available. The majority 99% of the population of the commune are farmers. The most important crop is rice, while other important products are bananas, coffee, sugarcane and cassava. Services provide employment for 1% of the population.
