= Namorona River =

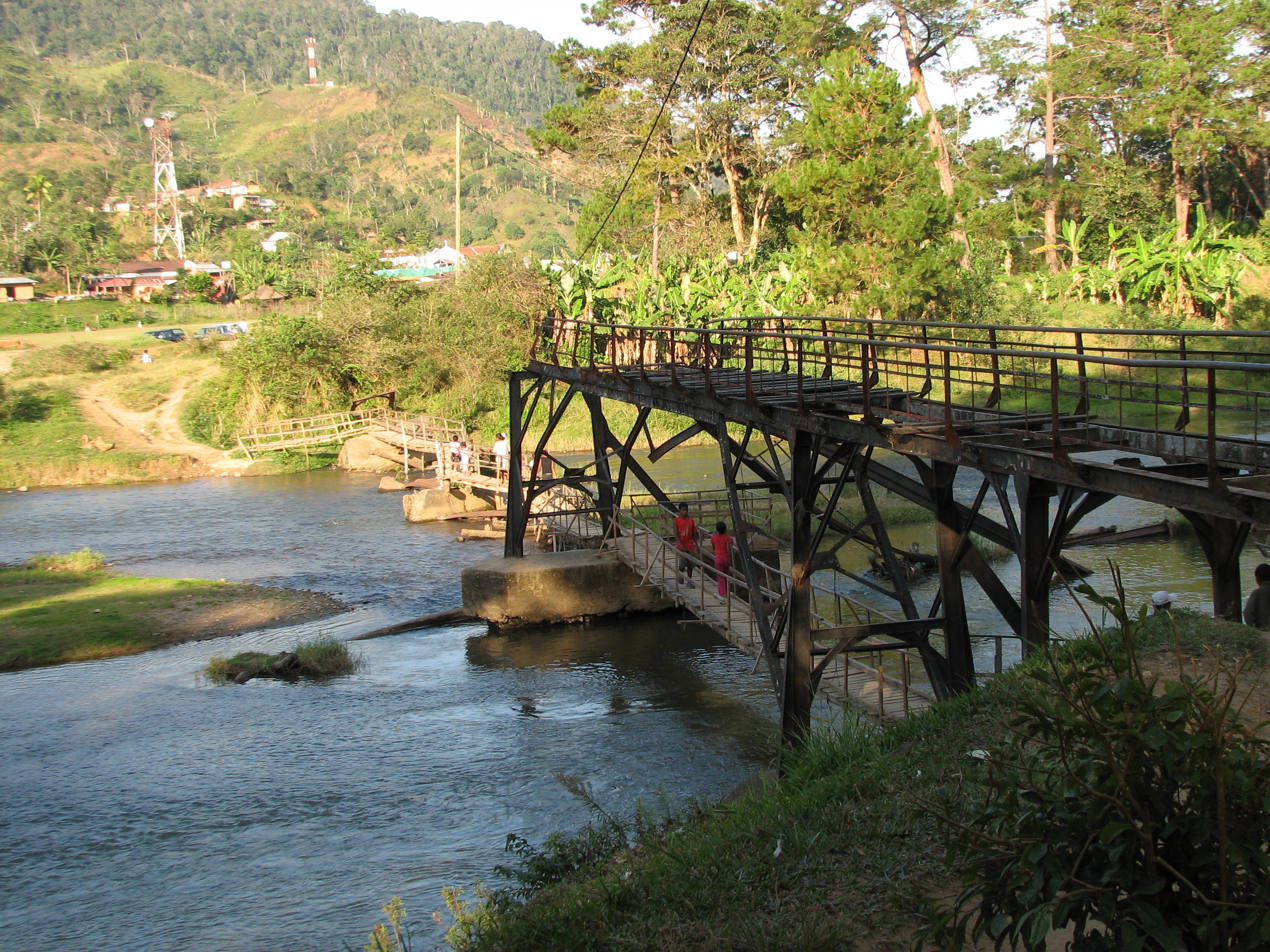
- Improvised bridge over the Namorona River

- Map of Malagasy rivers (Namorona flows from the central part to the eastern coast).

Location
- Country: Madagascar
- Region: Vatovavy
- Cities: Namorona, Ranomafana, Ifanadiana

Physical characteristics
- Mouth
  - location: Indian Ocean
  - coordinates: 21°39′43″S 48°13′26″E
- Length: 103 km (64 mi)
- Basin size: 2,204.8 km^{2} (851.3 mi^{2})
- Discharge
  - location: Near mouth
  - average: (Period: 1971–2000)59.6 m^{3}/s (2,100 cu ft/s)

Basin features
- River system: Namorona River

Namorona is a river in Vatovavy, eastern Madagascar. It flows down from the central highlands, runs along the Ranomafana National Park, forms the Andriamamovoka Falls, to flow into the Indian Ocean. It empties near Namorona and has a length of 103 km (64 mi).

The Namorona bassin
