= Namorona =

- Commune
- Location in Madagascar
- Coordinates: 21°39′S 48°12′E
- Country: Madagascar
- Region: Fitovinany
- District: Manakara
- Elevation: 8 m (26 ft)

Population (2018 census)
  - Total: 10,046
- Time zone: UTC+3 (EAT)

Namorona is a commune located on the east coast of Madagascar, at the mouth of the Namorona River. Since the division of Vatovavy-Fitovinany into the regions of Fitovinany and Vatovavy in 2021, it belongs to the district of Manakara in Fitovinany. It was previously part of the district of the district of Mananjary in Vatovavy-Fitovinany. Namorona recorded a population of 10,046 inhabitants in the 2018 Madagascar census.

Primary and junior level secondary education are available in town. The majority 96% of the population of the commune are farmers. The most important crops are rice and cloves; also coffee is an important agricultural product. Services provide employment for 1% of the population. Additionally fishing employs 3% of the population.

== Rivers ==
The Namorona River flows by this town.
