= Mahaela =

- Location in Madagascar
- Coordinates: 20°58′S 48°27′E
- Country: Madagascar
- Region: Vatovavy-Fitovinany
- District: Mananjary
- Elevation: 6 m (20 ft)

Population (2001)
  - Total: 23,000
- Time zone: UTC3 (EAT)

Mahaela is a town and commune in Madagascar. It belongs to the district of Mananjary, which is a part of Vatovavy-Fitovinany Region. The population of the commune was estimated to be approximately 23,000 in 2001 commune census.

Primary and junior level secondary education are available in town. The majority 95% of the population of the commune are farmers. The most important crop is rice, while other important products are sugarcane, coconuts and cassava. Services provide employment for 1% of the population. Additionally fishing employs 4% of the population.
