= Marofototra =

- Location in Madagascar
- Coordinates: 20°52′S 48°10′E
- Country: Madagascar
- Region: Vatovavy-Fitovinany
- District: Mananjary
- Elevation: 79 m (259 ft)

Population (2001)
  - Total: 15,000
- Time zone: UTC3 (EAT)

Marofototra is a town and commune in Madagascar. It belongs to the district of Mananjary, which is a part of Vatovavy-Fitovinany Region. The population of the commune was estimated to be approximately 15,000 in the 2001 commune census.

Primary and junior level secondary education is available in town. 98% of the commune's population is engaged in farming. The most important crops are cassava and rice, while other important agricultural products are peanuts and coffee. Services provide employment for 2% of the population.
