= Andonabe =

- Location in Madagascar
- Coordinates: 21°28′S 47°57′E
- Country: Madagascar
- Region: Vatovavy-Fitovinany
- District: Mananjary
- Elevation: 75 m (246 ft)

Population (2001)
  - Total: 12,000
- Time zone: UTC3 (EAT)

Andonabe is a town and commune in Madagascar. It belongs to the district of Mananjary, which is a part of Vatovavy-Fitovinany Region. The population of the commune was estimated to be approximately 12,000 in 2001 commune census.

Only primary schooling is available. It is also a site of industrial-scale mining. The majority 98% of the population of the commune are farmers. The most important crops are coffee and rice; also pepper is an important agricultural product. Industry and services provide both employment for 1% of the population.
