= Vohilava, Mananjary =

Vohilava
- Location in Madagascar
- Coordinates: 21°4′S 48°0′E
- Country: Madagascar
- Region: Vatovavy
- District: Mananjary

Government
  - Mayor: Marie Claire Razafindravelo
- Elevation: 103 m (338 ft)

Population (2001)
  - Total: 32,000
- Time zone: UTC3 (EAT)
- Postal code: 317

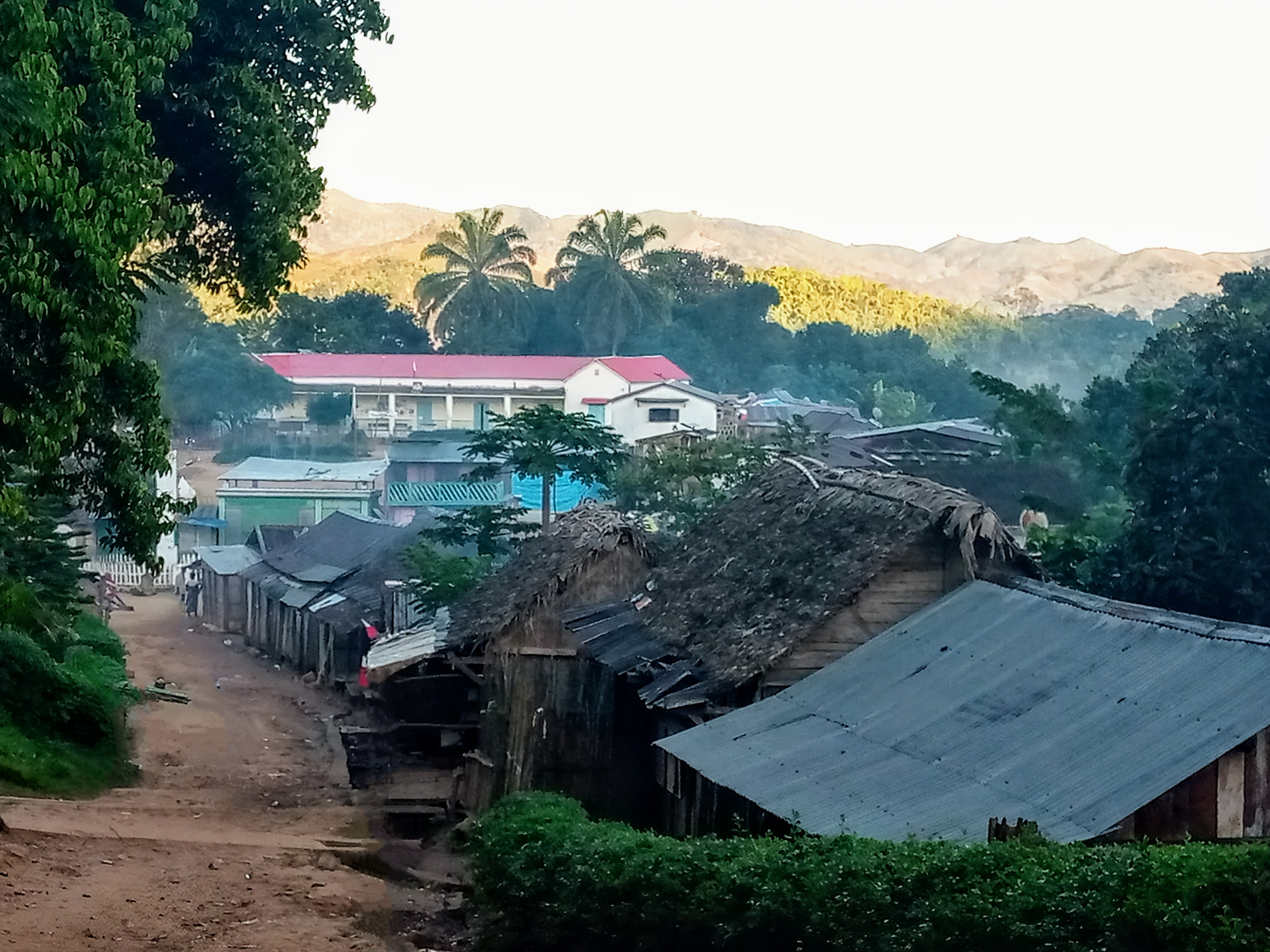
Vohilava village

Vohilava is a rural municipality in Madagascar. It belongs to the district of Mananjary, which is a part of the region of Vatovavy. The population of the municipality was estimated to be approximately 32,000 in 2001 commune census.

== Geography ==
Vohilava is situated at the Isaka river. It is the endpoint of the Route nationale 24 from Mananjary that is situated at 61km.

Primary and junior level secondary education are available in town. The majority 97% of the population of the commune are farmers. The most important crops are coffee and rice; also bananas are an important agricultural product. Services provide employment for 3% of the population.
