= Manakana Nord =

- Location in Madagascar
- Coordinates: 21°19′S 47°51′E
- Country: Madagascar
- Region: Vatovavy-Fitovinany
- District: Mananjary
- Elevation: 58 m (190 ft)

Population (2001)
  - Total: 5,000
- Time zone: UTC3 (EAT)

Manakana Nord is a town and commune in Madagascar. It belongs to the district of Mananjary, which is a part of Vatovavy-Fitovinany Region. The population of the commune was estimated to be approximately 5,000 in 2001 commune census.

Only primary schooling is available. The majority 99.8% of the population of the commune are farmers. The most important crops are coffee and bananas, while other important agricultural products are cassava and rice. Services provide employment for 0.1% of the population. Additionally fishing employs 0.1% of the population.
