= Morafeno, Mananjary =

Morafeno
- Location in Madagascar
- Coordinates: 21°6′S 48°12′E
- Country: Madagascar
- Region: Vatovavy-Fitovinany
- District: Mananjary
- Elevation: 29 m (95 ft)

Population (2001)
  - Total: 13,000
- Time zone: UTC3 (EAT)

Morafeno is a town and commune in Madagascar. It belongs to the district of Mananjary, which is a part of Vatovavy-Fitovinany Region. The population of the commune was estimated to be approximately 13,000 in 2001 commune census.

Only primary schooling is available. The majority 74.5% of the population of the commune are farmers. The most important crop is rice, while other important products are coffee and pepper. Industry and services provide employment for 25% and 0.5% of the population, respectively.
