= Sandrohy =

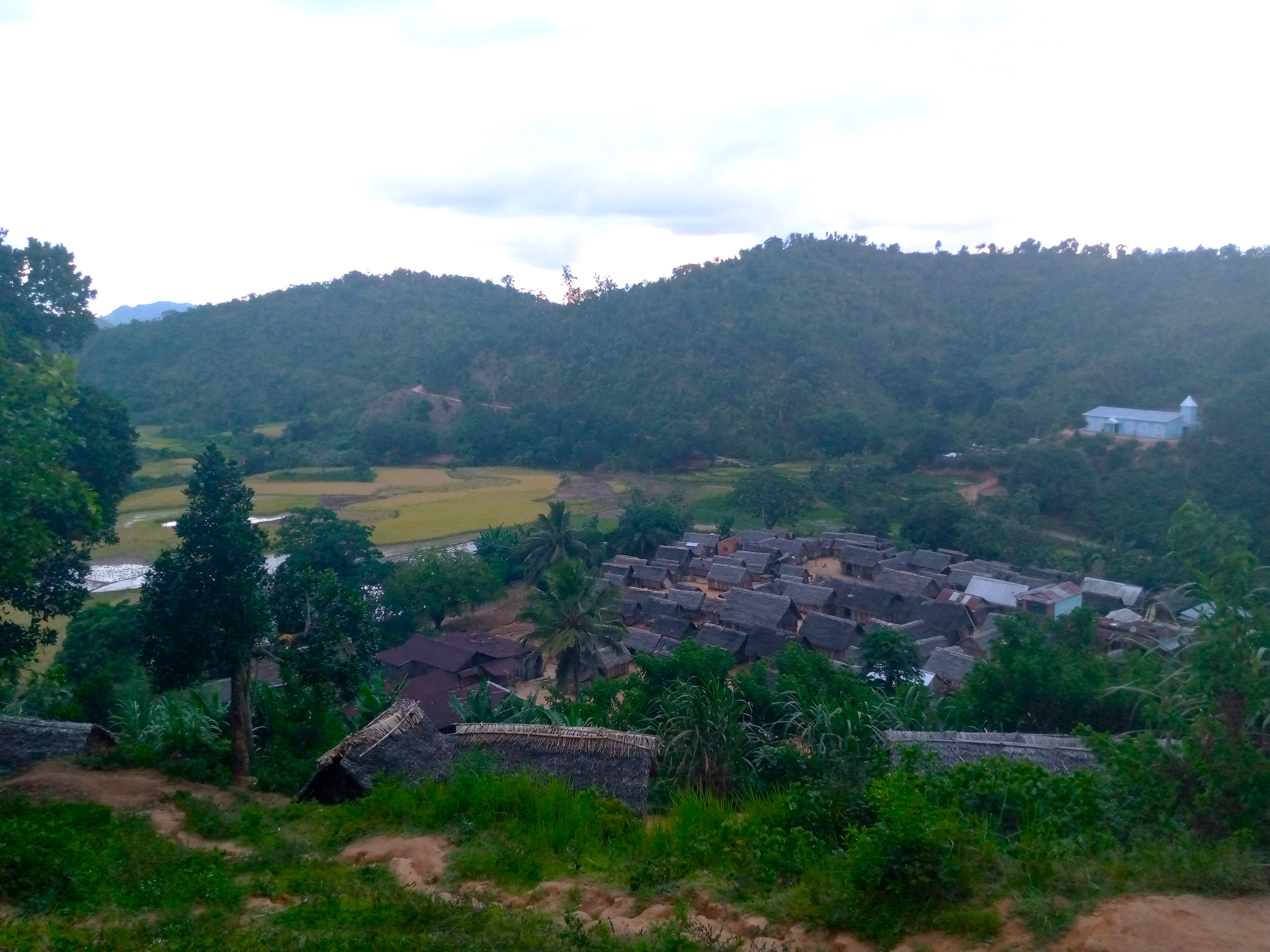

- Location in Madagascar
- Coordinates: 21°36′S 47°54′E
- Country: Madagascar
- Region: Vatovavy
- District: Mananjary
- Elevation: 109 m (358 ft)

Population (2001)
  - Total: 5,000
- Time zone: UTC3 (EAT)

Sandrohy is a rural municipality in Madagascar. It belongs to the district of Mananjary, which is a part of Vatovavy. The population of the commune was estimated to be approximately 5,000 in 2001 commune census.

Only primary schooling is available. The majority 99.4% of the population of the commune are farmers. The most important crop is rice, while other important products are bananas, coffee and cassava. Services provide employment for 0.6% of the population.
