= Ambalahosy Nord =

- Location in Madagascar
- Coordinates: 21°18′S 47°53′E
- Country: Madagascar
- Region: Vatovavy-Fitovinany
- District: Mananjary
- Elevation: 88 m (289 ft)

Population (2001)
  - Total: 3,000
- Time zone: UTC3 (EAT)

Ambalahosy Nord is a town and commune in Madagascar. It belongs to the district of Mananjary, which is a part of Vatovavy-Fitovinany Region. The population of the commune was estimated to be approximately 3,000 in 2001 commune census.

Only primary schooling is available. It is also a site of industrial-scale mining. The majority 99.84% of the population of the commune are farmers. The most important crops are coffee and rice, while other important agricultural products are bananas and cassava. Services provide employment for 0.06% of the population. Additionally fishing employs 0.1% of the population.
