= Ranomafana National Park =

National park in Madagascar

- IUCN category II (national park)
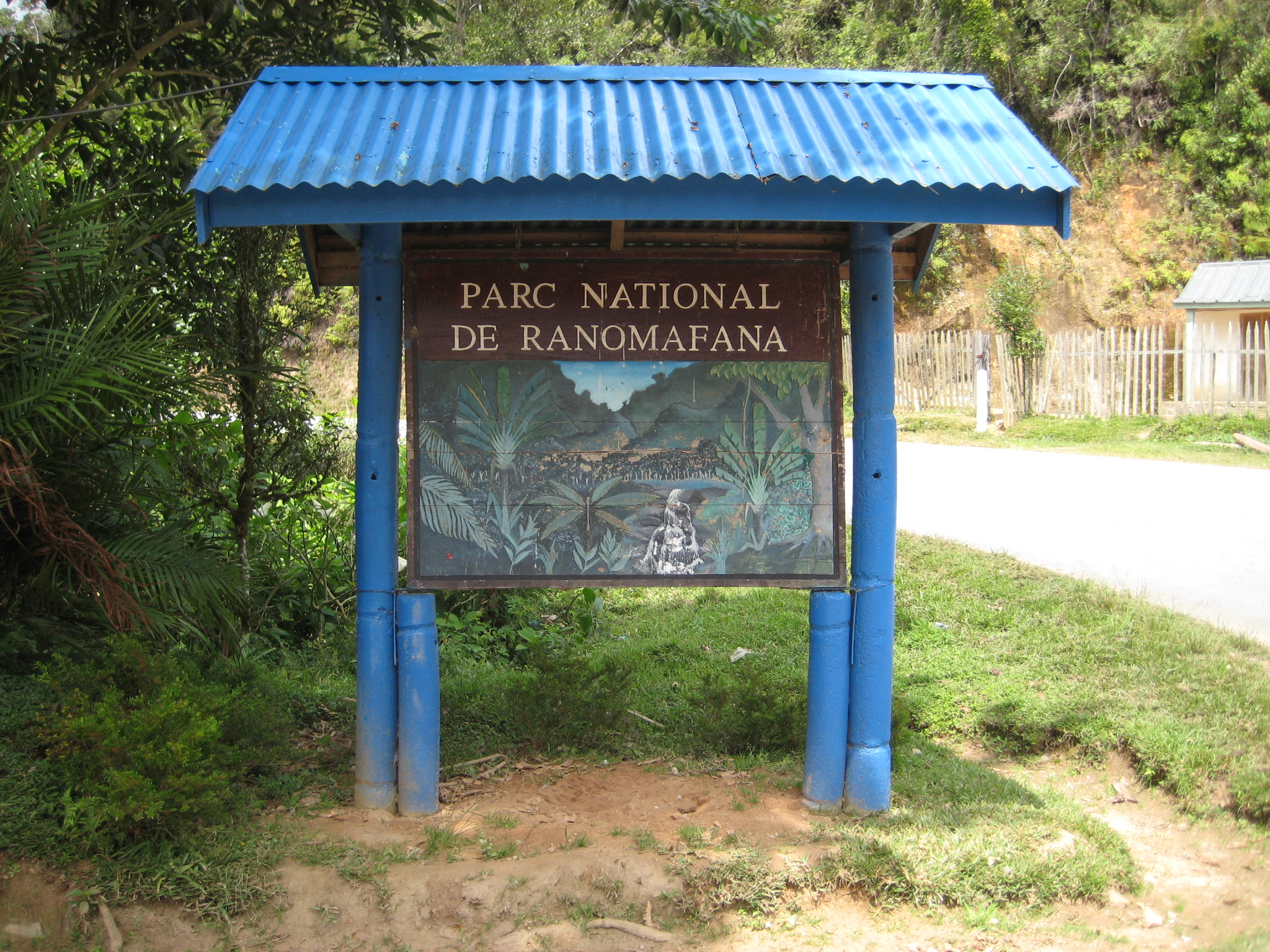
- Entrance sign to Ranomafana National Park

- Location within Madagascar
- Nearest city: Fianarantsoa, Ranomafana
- Coordinates: 21°13′S 47°26′E
- Area: 416 km^{2} (161 sq mi)
- Established: 1991
- Governing body: Madagascar National Parks Association

UNESCO World Heritage Site
- Type: Natural
- Criteria: ix, x
- Designated: 2007
- Reference no.: 1257
- Region: List of World Heritage Sites in Africa

Ranomafana National Park is a national park in southeastern Madagascar, in the Haute Matsiatra and Vatovavy regions. It was established as Madagascar's fourth national park in 1991 following the rediscovery of the greater bamboo lemur (Prolemur simus) and the discovery of the golden bamboo lemur (Hapalemur aureus) by the primatologist Dr. Patricia Wright.

The park protects more than 41,600 hectares (161 square miles) of tropical rainforest at elevations ranging from 800 to 1,200 m (2,600 to 3,900 ft) and is home to several rare species of plants and animals. It was later integrated into the UNESCO World Heritage Site Rainforests of the Atsinanana. The Centre ValBio research station is adjacent to the park and was created in 2003 by Stony Brook University for biodiversity research, community health and education, environmental arts, and reforestation.

The park's name is derived from the Malagasy words rano mafana ("hot water") due to the hot springs in the nearby town of Ranomafana.

== Flora and fauna ==
The range of altitudes in the park produces a variety of forest types, including lowland rainforest and cloud forest. These forests support high levels of biodiversity. The park hosts 90 species of butterflies, 112 species of frogs, 22 species of lizards, 22 species of snake, and 118 species of birds, 30 of which are endemic to the park. Notable birds include ground rollers, blue vangas, short-legged ground rollers, velvet asities, and brown mesites.

List of lemur species found in Ranomafana National Park
| Viewing Time | Species |
|---|---|
| Daytime | Golden bamboo lemur, Hapalemur aureus Greater bamboo lemur, Prolemur simus Milne-Edwards's sifaka, Propithecus edwardsi Southern black and white ruffed lemur, Varecia variegata editorum Ranomafana grey bamboo lemur, Hapalemur griseus ranomafanensis Red-bellied lemur, Eulemur rubriventer Red-fronted brown lemur, Eulemur rufifrons |
| Nighttime | Aye-aye, Daubentonia madagascariensis Brown mouse lemur, Microcebus rufus Crossley's dwarf lemur, Cheirogaleus crossleyi Peyrieras's woolly lemur, Avahi peyrierasi Sibree's dwarf lemur, Cheirogaleus sibreei Small-toothed sportive lemur, Lepilemur microdon |

== Scientific research ==
There are four main sites for scientific research. Talatakely is located within walking distance of Centre ValBio and is also accessible to tourists off of Route 25. Talatakely is the site of the original research camp and is one of the few locations in the park where Prolemur simus can be seen. The three remaining research sites (Vatoharanana, Valohoaka, and Mangevo) maintain bush camp facilities. In addition to these main sites, research has been conducted throughout the park.

== Tourism ==
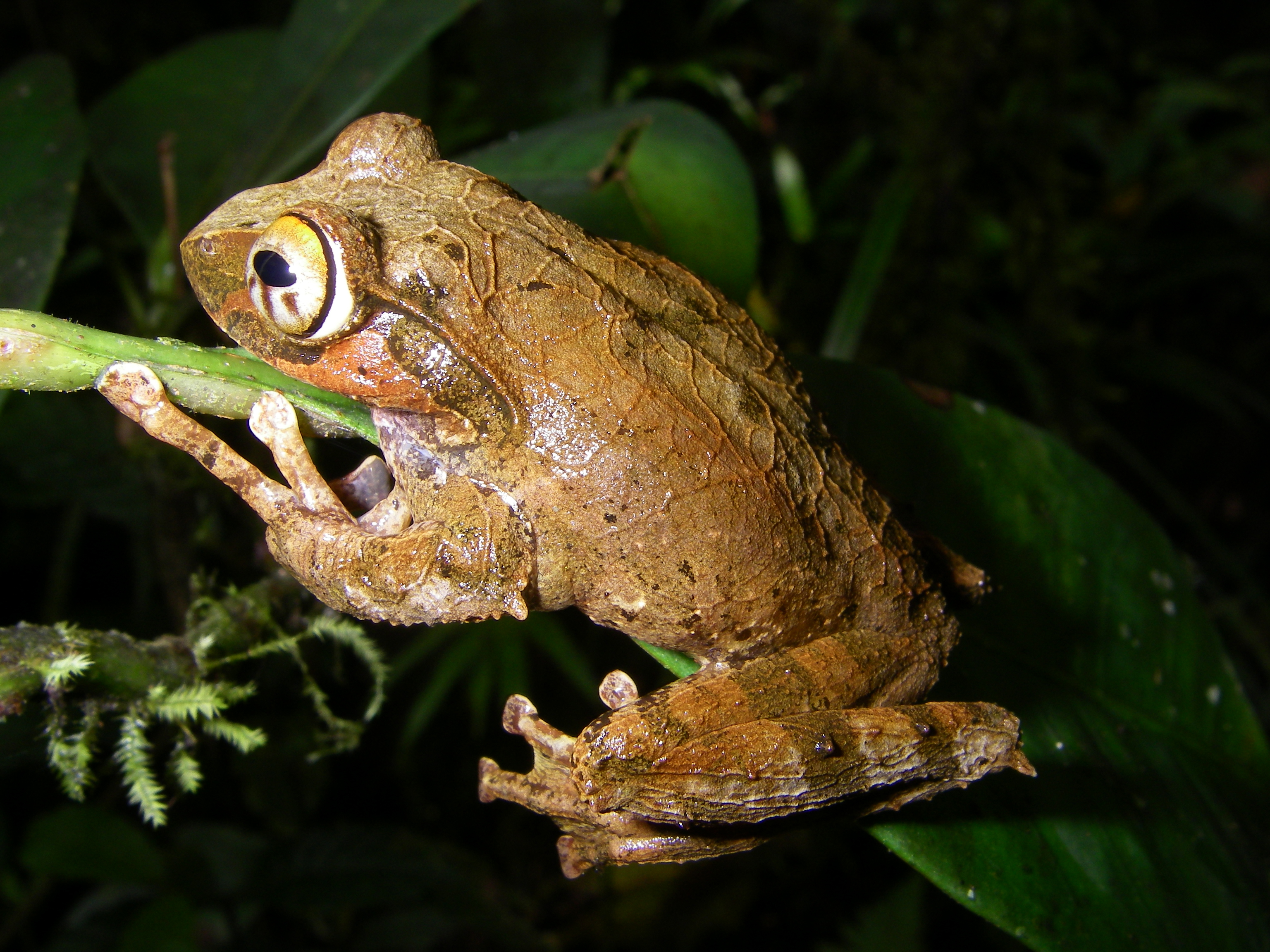
Boophis reticulatus at Ranomafana National Park

As with all national parks in Madagascar, a local guide is required for visitors entering the park. It has seven hiking trails that vary in length from 10 to 20 km (6.2 to 12.4 mi) and offer opportunities for birdwatching, viewing lemurs, and seeing waterfalls.

Talatakely has well-defined paths and stairs, although sturdy shoes should be worn as the path can be slippery when wet. Specialist guides can be arranged through Centre ValBio for excursions.

Kayaking or canoeing can also be arranged and a hot springs pool is located in Ranomafana.

== Lodging ==
There are multiple ecolodges administered by private tourist operators near the entrance of the national park. There are also around 15 hotels in Ranomafana village with various accommodation options and prices. Additionally, it is possible to camp at the campsite near the main road through the park. Researchers can also find lodging at Centre ValBio, where the scientific research community that works in the park is based.

The park is 65 km (40 mi) northeast of Fianarantsoa and 139 km (86 mi) west of Mananjary. The park office is at the entrance to the village of Ambodiamontana, 6.5 km (4.0 mi) from the town of Ranomafana. The park is crossed by National Road 25 and National Road 45.

== See also ==
- List of national parks of Madagascar
- Fauna of Madagascar
