= Route nationale 24 (Madagascar) =

Road in Madagascar

Location
- Country: Madagascar

Highway system
- Roads in Madagascar

Route nationale 24 (RN 24) is a secondary, unpaved highway in Madagascar of 61 km, running from Manajary to Vohilava. It crosses the region of Vatovavy.

== Selected locations on route ==
(East to West)

- Mananjary- (junction with RN11
- Sahavary
- Ambodimangakely
- Vohilava
