= Vatohandrina =

- Location in Madagascar
- Coordinates: 21°33′S 47°50′E
- Country: Madagascar
- Region: Vatovavy-Fitovinany
- District: Mananjary
- Elevation: 160 m (520 ft)

Population (2001)
  - Total: 8,000
- Time zone: UTC3 (EAT)

Vatohandrina is a town and commune in Madagascar. It belongs to the district of Mananjary, which is a part of Vatovavy-Fitovinany Region. The population of the commune was estimated to be approximately 8,000 in 2001 commune census.

Only primary schooling is available. The majority 99.5% of the population of the commune are farmers. The most important crop is coffee, while other important products are bananas, cassava and rice. Services provide employment for 0.5% of the population.
