= Mananjary Airport =

Airport in Madagascar

- IATA: MNJ; ICAO: FMSM

Summary
- Airport type: Public/Military
- Operator: ADEMA (Aéroports de Madagascar)
- Serves: Mananjary
- Location: Vatovavy, Madagascar
- Elevation AMSL: 20 ft / 6 m
- Coordinates: 21°12′06″S 48°21′29″E

Map
- Location within Madagascar

Runways
Direction	Length		Surface
Direction	ft	m	Surface
04/22	4,921	1,500	Asphalt
- DAFIF

Mananjary Airport (IATA: MNJ, ICAO: FMSM) is an airport in Mananjary, Vatovavy, Madagascar, located on the east coast on the island.
