= Route nationale 25 (Madagascar) =

Road in Madagascar

Location
- Country: Madagascar

Highway system
- Roads in Madagascar

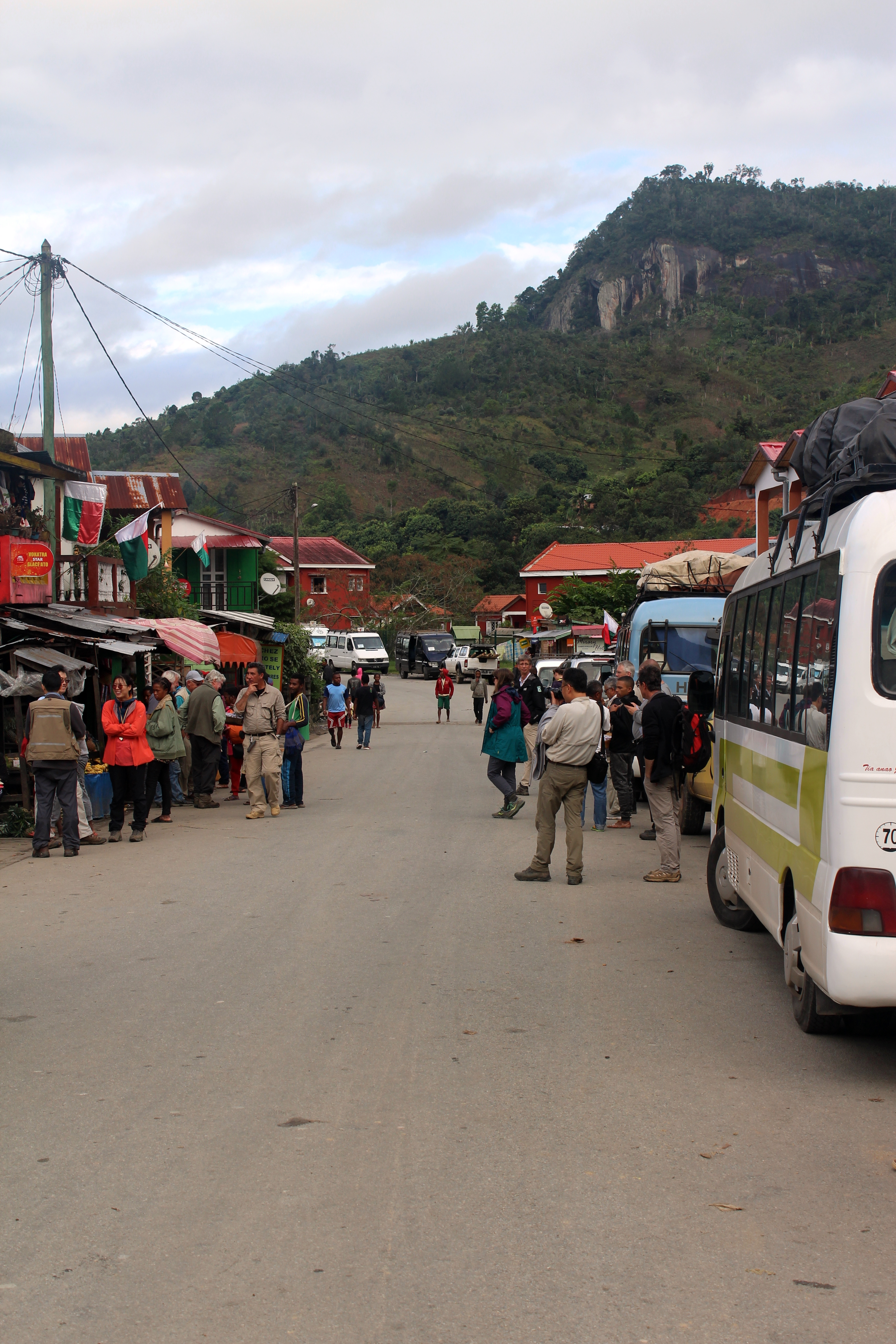
RN25 - Ranomafana

Route nationale 25 (RN 25) is a primary highway in Madagascar of 161 km, running from Mananjary, Fianarantsoa to RN7. It crosses the regions of Vatovavy and Haute Matsiatra. It is only partly paved and often in bad condition.

== Selected locations on route ==
(east to west)

- Mananjary, Fianarantsoa (already on RN 11)
- Betampona (near Betampona intersection with RN 11)
- Fenoarivo, Ambalavao
- Irondro (intersection with RN 12)
- Kianjavato
- Ifanadiana (intersection with RN 14 to Ikongo/Vohipeno)
- Ranomafana National Park
- Vorodolo - (intersection with RN 45)
- Ambalakindresy
- Manandroy

- intersection with RN7

- Ambohimahasoa

== See also ==
- List of roads in Madagascar
- Transport in Madagascar
