= Mananjary District =

- District
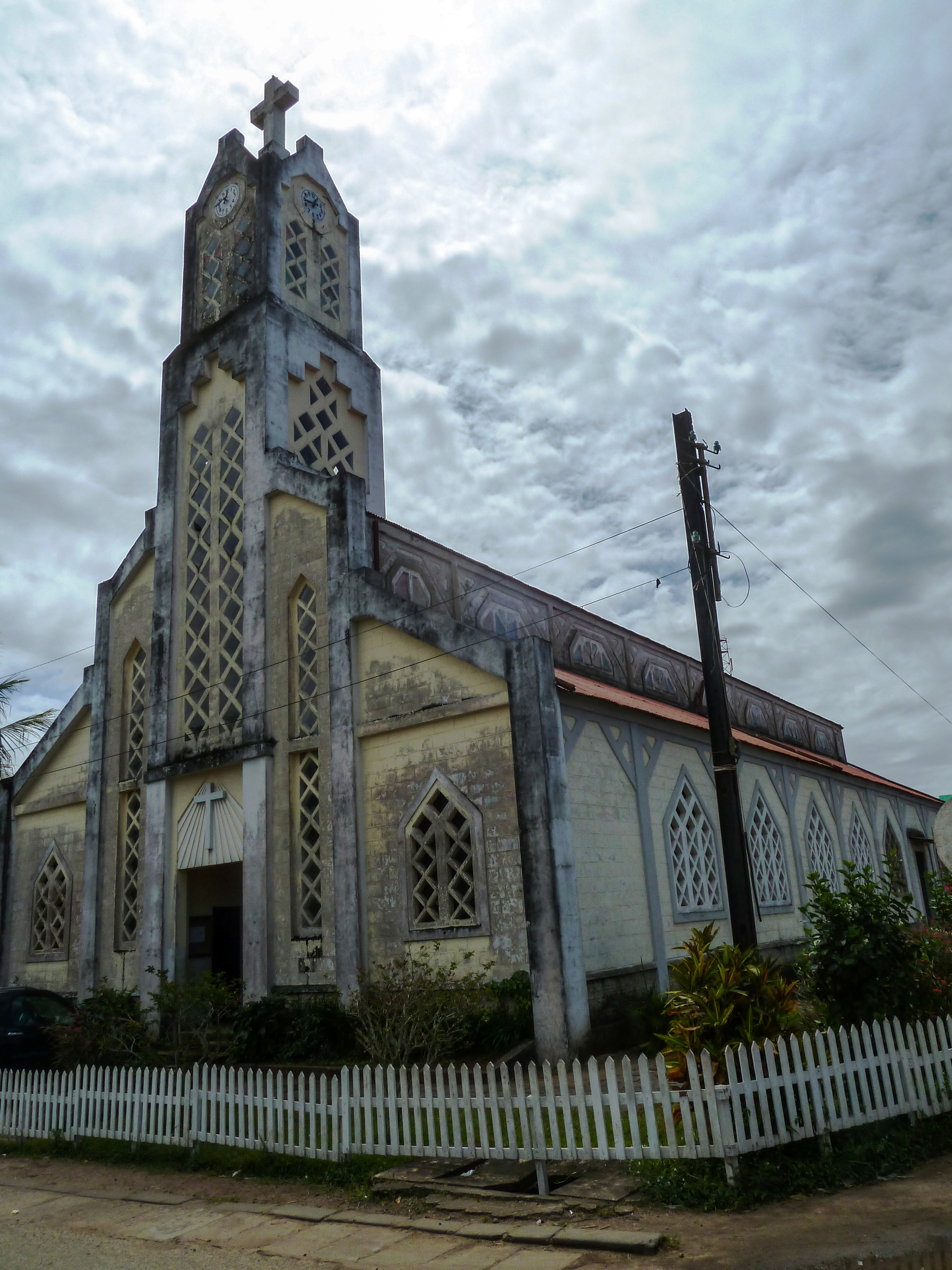
- Church in Mananjary

- Location within Madagascar
- Country: Madagascar
- Region: Vatovavy
- District: Mananjary

Area
  - Land: 5,467 km^{2} (2,111 sq mi)
- Elevation: 12 m (39 ft)

Population (2018)
  - Total: 276,887
  - Density: 50.6/km^{2} (131/sq mi)
- postal code: 317

Mananjary is a district of Vatovavy in Madagascar. Its capital is the city of Mananjary.

== Communes ==
The district is further divided into 25 communes:

- Ambalahosy Nord
- Ambodinonoka
- Ambohimiarina II
- Ambohinihaonana
- Andonabe
- Andranambolava
- Andranomavo
- Anosimparihy
- Antsenavolo
- Irondro
- Kianjavato
- Mahaela
- Mahatsara Iefaka
- Mahatsara Sud
- Mahavoky Nord
- Manakana Nord
- Mananjary
- Marofototra
- Marokarima
- Marosangy
- Morafeno
- Namorona
- Sandrohy
- Tsaravary
- Tsiatosika
- Vatohandrina
- Vohilava

== Protected area ==
- Part of the Ambositra-Vondrozo Forest Corridor, a protected harmonious landscape.
