= Mananjary River =

River in Southern Madagascar

Manajary (River)
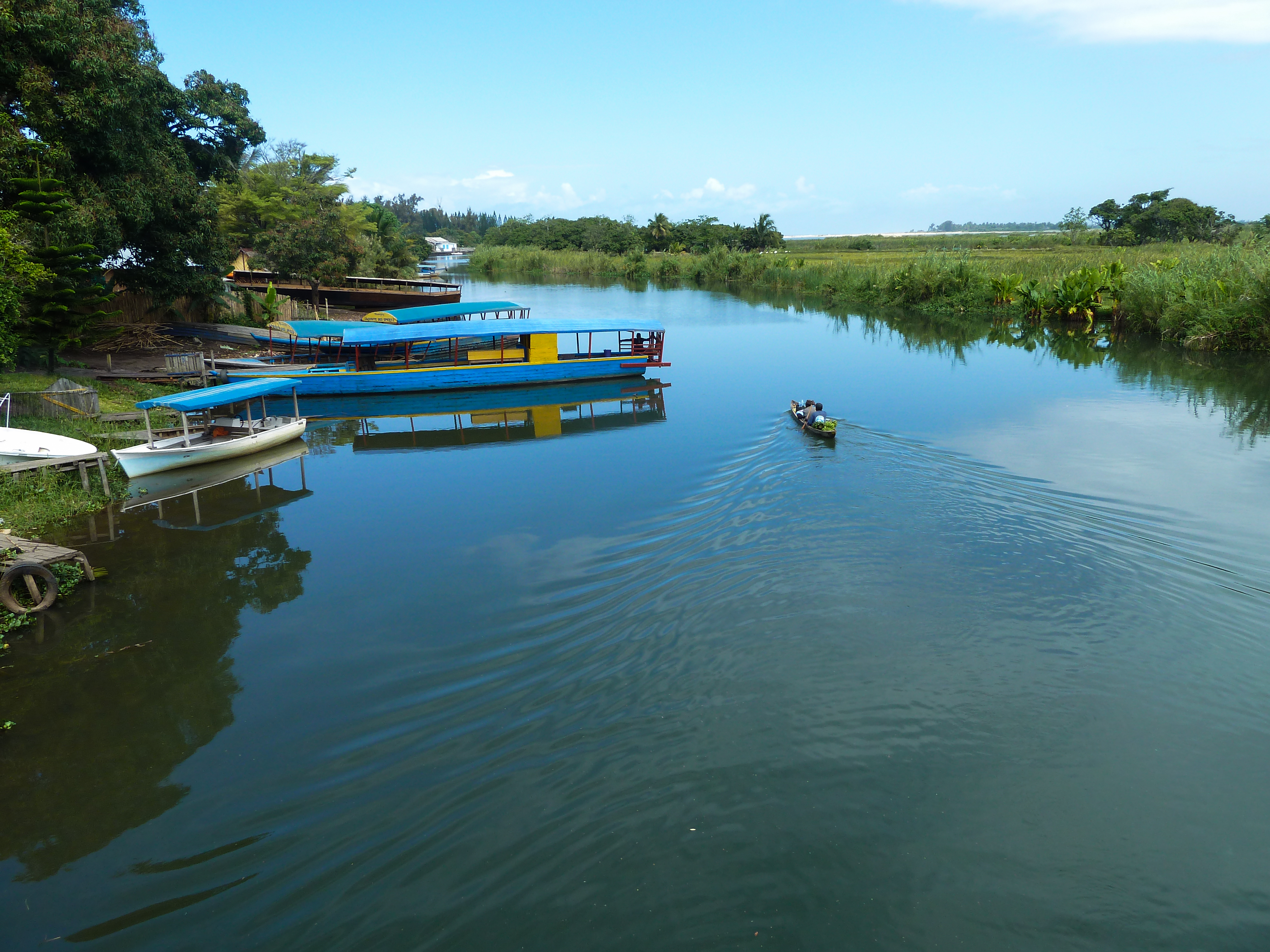

Location
- Country: Madagascar
- Region: Vatovavy

Physical characteristics
- Source
  - location: south of Fandriana
  - elevation: 1,500 m (4,900 ft)
- Mouth
  - location: Mananjary
  - coordinates: 21°15′25″S 48°20′40″E
  - elevation: 0 m (0 ft)
- Length: 212 km (132 mi)
- Basin size: 6,780 km^{2} (2,620 mi^{2}) to 6,992.5 km^{2} (2,699.8 mi^{2})
- Discharge
  - location: Near mouth
  - average: (Period: 1971–2000)190.6 m^{3}/s (6,730 cu ft/s)

Basin features
- River system: Mananjary River
- Tributaries
  - left: Ampasory, Saka, Maka
  - right: Ivoanana, Manaroko

The Mananjary River is located in southern Madagascar, in the region of Vatovavy.

It drains to the eastern coast, into the Indian Ocean. It serves as the southern edge of the territory known as Betsimisaraka.

Its mouth is situated in the city of Mananjary.

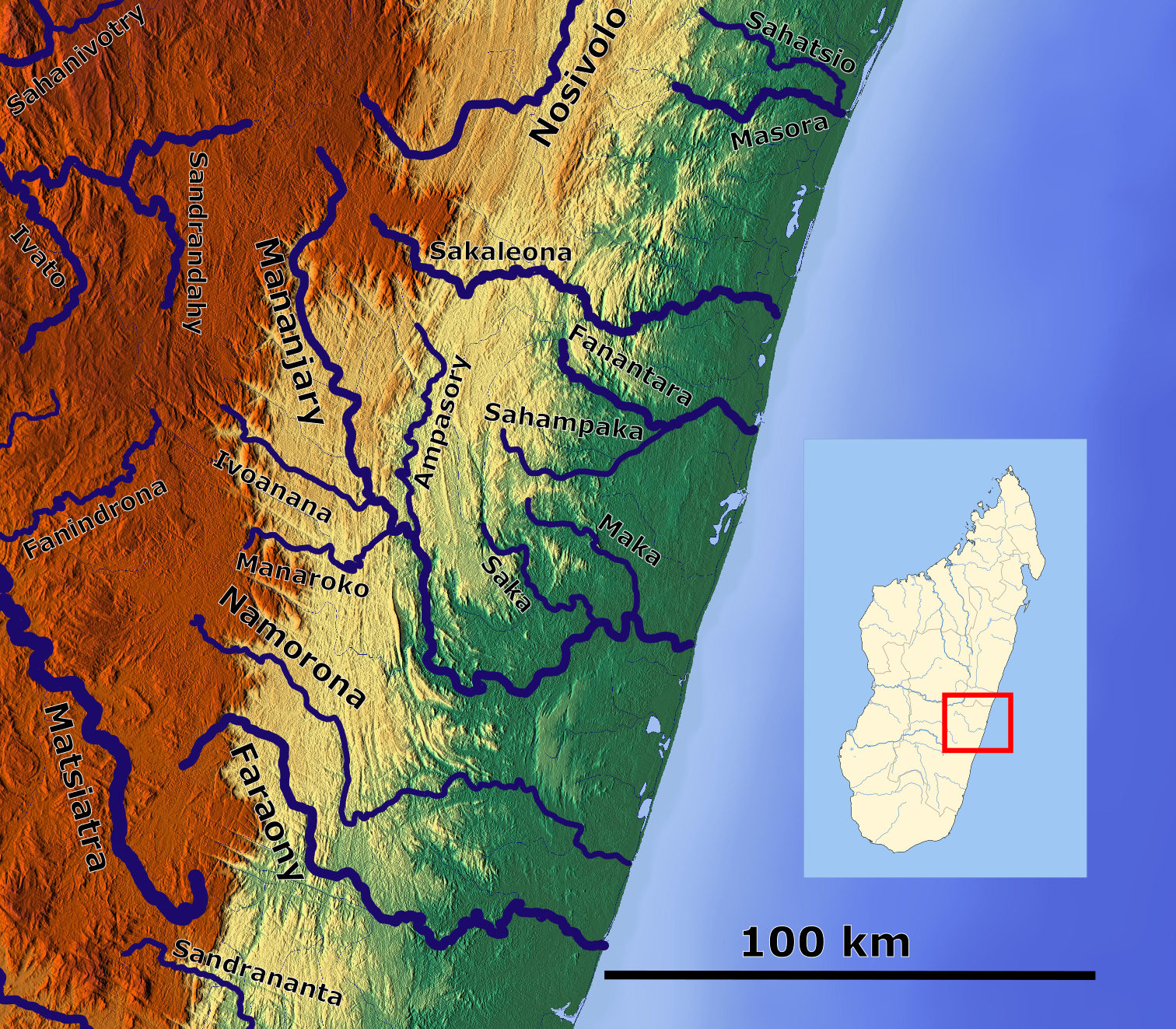
Mananjary river
