= Mananjary =

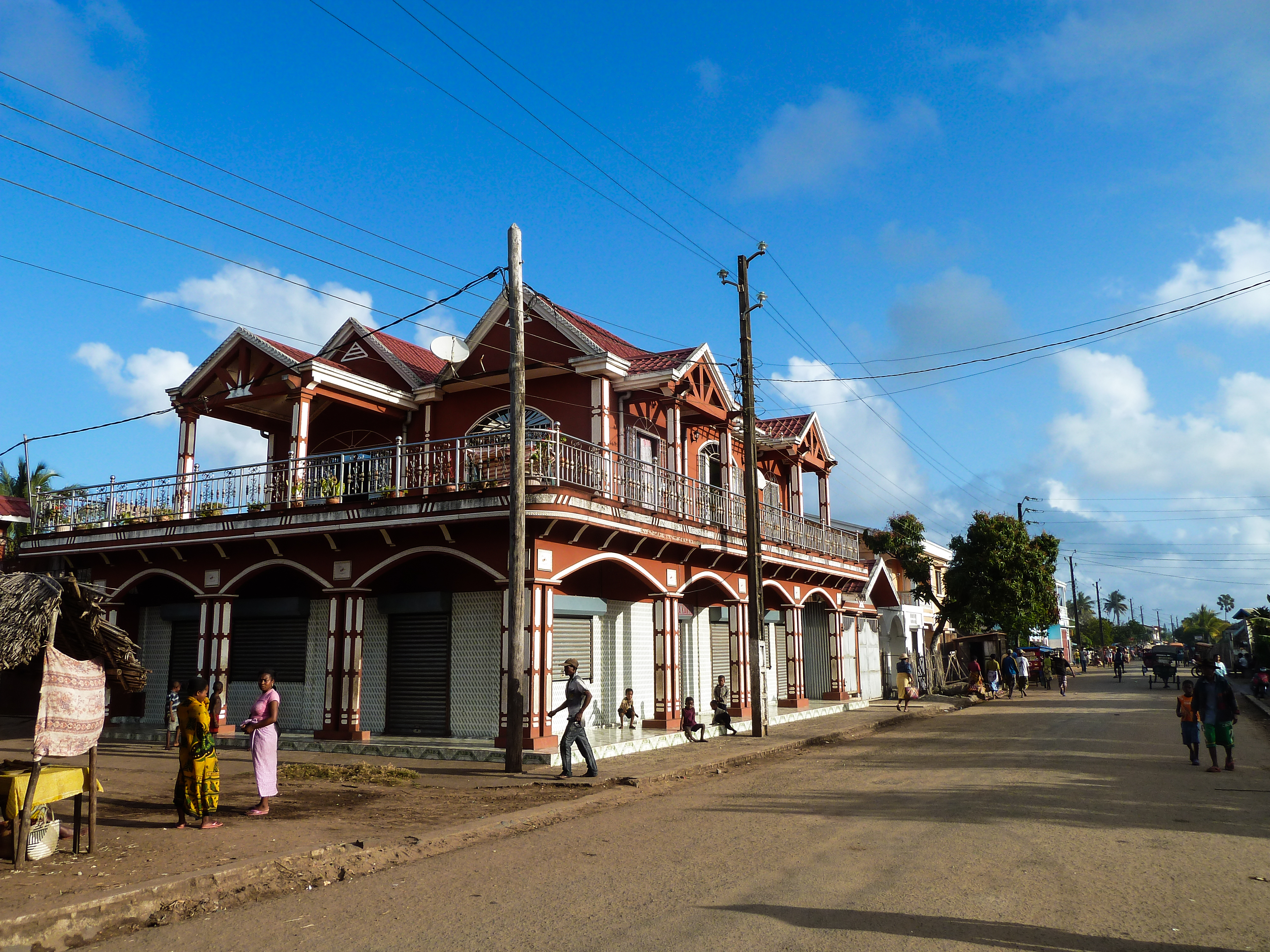
- Mananjary

- Location in Madagascar
- Coordinates: 20°14′S 48°21′E
- Country: Madagascar
- Region: Vatovavy
- District: Mananjary
- Elevation: 12 m (39 ft)

Population (2018)
  - Total: 25,222
- Time zone: UTC3 (EAT)
- Code postal: 317

Mananjary is a city on the East coast of Madagascar with a population of 25,222 inhabitants in 2018. It is the chief town of the Mananjary district and the Vatovavy region.

It contains a town of the same name, situated on the southern part of the east coast, where the Mananjary River flows into the Indian Ocean. There's a small port and an airport.

Mananjary is situated 130 km south of Nosy Varika on the RN 11 and 167 km north of Manakara by the National road 12 and National road 25. The Canal des Pangalanes divides the town into two sections.

In 2022 Cyclone Batsirai made landfall at Mananjary, leaving the city 90% destroyed.

== Economy ==
Agriculture production is focused on vanilla, coffee, and pepper production.

== Roads ==
- National road 24 - Mananjary - Vohilava, Mananjary (intersection with RN11)
- National road 25 - leading inlands (westwards) to RN7 and Fianarantsoa.
- National road 11 - Northwards from Mananjary to Nosy Varika.
- National road 12 - Southwards, to Manakara

== Religion ==
It is the seat of the Roman Catholic Diocese of Mananjary.

The small Antambahoaka tribe holds a ceremonial mass circumcision rite every seven years in the village, called "Sambatra."

== Education ==
- École primaire française de Mananjary

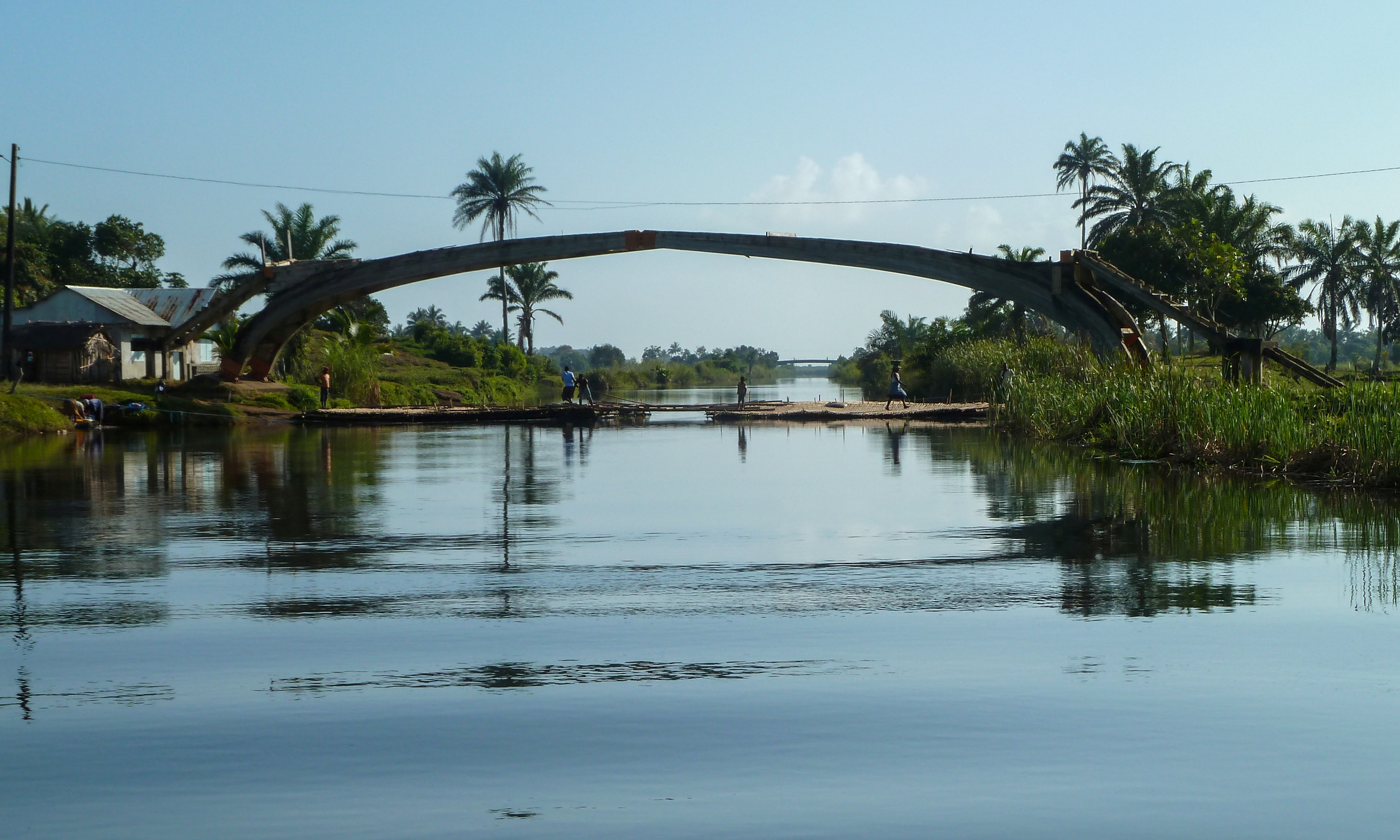
An inoperative bridge on Canal des Pangalanes in Mananjary in 2013, which was damaged by a typhoon. Underneath the bridge, a makeshift bamboo bridge was built, which is removed for passing ships upon payment of a fee.

== Climate ==
Climate data for Mananjary (1991–2020)
Month	Jan	Feb	Mar	Apr	May	Jun	Jul	Aug	Sep	Oct	Nov	Dec	Year
Record high °C (°F)	33.8 (92.8)	37.4 (99.3)	33.5 (92.3)	34.0 (93.2)	31.8 (89.2)	29.5 (85.1)	30.0 (86.0)	31.0 (87.8)	31.0 (87.8)	30.0 (86.0)	32.8 (91.0)	33.0 (91.4)	37.4 (99.3)
Mean daily maximum °C (°F)	29.4 (84.9)	29.4 (84.9)	28.7 (83.7)	27.6 (81.7)	26.0 (78.8)	24.3 (75.7)	23.5 (74.3)	24.2 (75.6)	25.1 (77.2)	26.6 (79.9)	27.9 (82.2)	29.1 (84.4)	26.8 (80.2)
Daily mean °C (°F)	26.5 (79.7)	26.5 (79.7)	25.9 (78.6)	24.8 (76.6)	23.0 (73.4)	21.3 (70.3)	20.5 (68.9)	20.8 (69.4)	21.8 (71.2)	23.4 (74.1)	24.9 (76.8)	26.1 (79.0)	23.8 (74.8)
Mean daily minimum °C (°F)	23.5 (74.3)	23.5 (74.3)	23.1 (73.6)	21.9 (71.4)	20.0 (68.0)	18.3 (64.9)	17.3 (63.1)	17.3 (63.1)	18.4 (65.1)	20.1 (68.2)	21.7 (71.1)	23.0 (73.4)	20.7 (69.3)
Record low °C (°F)	18.5 (65.3)	20.0 (68.0)	18.0 (64.4)	16.9 (62.4)	12.1 (53.8)	11.5 (52.7)	11.4 (52.5)	12.9 (55.2)	13.2 (55.8)	13.2 (55.8)	16.5 (61.7)	18.6 (65.5)	11.4 (52.5)
Average precipitation mm (inches)	324.0 (12.76)	374.3 (14.74)	398.5 (15.69)	234.7 (9.24)	212.7 (8.37)	200.9 (7.91)	192.4 (7.57)	121.3 (4.78)	80.4 (3.17)	118.1 (4.65)	120.0 (4.72)	213.2 (8.39)	2,590.5 (101.99)
Average precipitation days (≥ 1.0 mm)	17.0	17.2	18.2	13.6	13.3	13.4	16.3	10.8	9.0	8.7	8.4	13.4	159.3
Source: NOAA
