= Vatovavy =

- Region
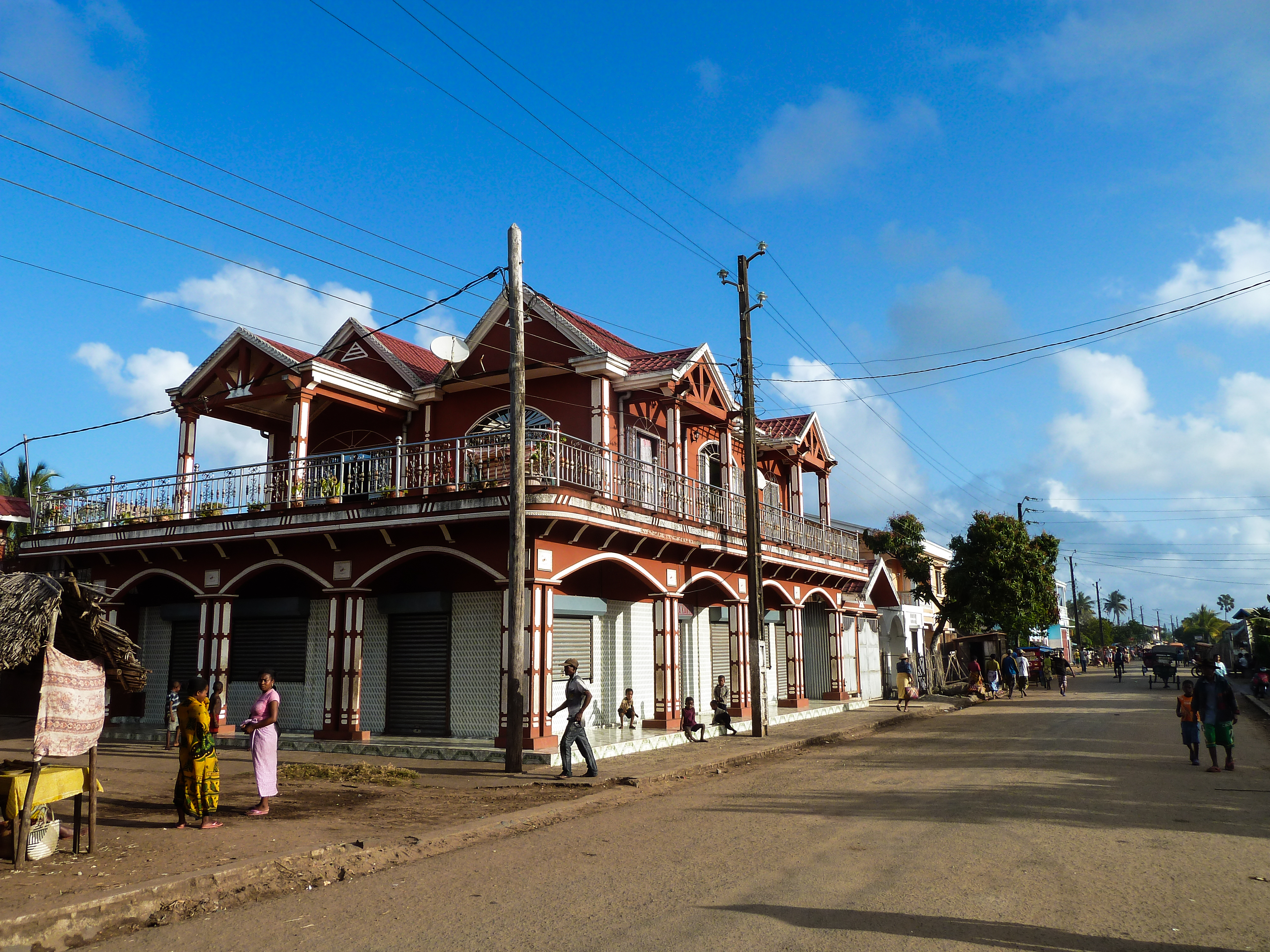
- Mananjary

- Location in Madagascar
- Country: Madagascar
- Creation: 16.06.2021
- Capital: Mananjary

Government
  - Gouverneur: Lucien Randriarison

Population (2018)
  - Total: 705,675
- Time zone: UTC3 (EAT)

Vatovavy is a region of Madagascar. Its capital is Mananjary. It was created by dividing the former region of Vatovavy-Fitovinany on 16 June 2021.

Cyclone Batsirai made landfall at Mananjary in 2022, leaving 90 percent of the city destroyed.

== Administrative divisions ==
Vatovavy Region is divided into three districts, which are sub-divided into 58 communes.

- Ifanadiana District - 14 communes
- Mananjary District - 25 communes
- Nosy Varika District - 19 communes

== Transportation ==
- Train - 180 km (from Fianarantsoa)
- Car Taxi-Brousse
- One airport: Mananjary Airport

== Bodies of water ==
- the Namorona River
- the Mananjary River
- the Sakaleona River and the Sakaleona Falls, the highest waterfall in Madagascar (200m)

== Protected areas ==
- Part of Ranomafana National Park
