= Ambohitrova =

- Location in Madagascar
- Coordinates: 22°10′S 47°44′E
- Country: Madagascar
- Region: Fitovinany
- District: Vohipeno
- Elevation: 17 m (56 ft)

Population (2018)
  - Total: 3,659
- Time zone: UTC+3 (EAT)
- Postal code: 316

Ambohitrova is a rural municipality in Madagascar. It belongs to the district of Vohipeno, which is a part of the region of Fitovinany. The population of the municipality was 3,659 in 2018.

== Rivers ==
The municipality is situated on the banks of the Sandrananta River.
