= Ivato (disambiguation) =

Ivato may stand for:

- Ivato International Airport - the airport of Antananarivo, Madagascar.
- Ivato, a commune in Analamanga, in Madagascar.
- Ivato, Ambositra (=Ivato Centre), a commune in Amoron'i Mania, in Madagascar.
- Ivato, Vohipeno, a commune in Fitovinany, in Madagascar.
- Ivato, Vondrozo, a commune in Atsimo-Atsinanana, in Madagascar.
