= Mahazoarivo =

Mahazoarivo may refer to the following places in Madagascar:

- Mahazoarivo, Fandriana, a town and commune in Amoron'i Mania Region
- Mahazoarivo, Fianarantsoa II, a town and commune in Haute Matsiatra Region
- Mahazoarivo palace, official residence of the Prime minister
- Mahazoarivo, Vohipeno, a town and commune in Vatovavy-Fitovinany Region
- Mahazoarivo, Vondrozo, a rural municipality in Atsimo-Atsinanana Region
