= Ivato, Vohipeno =

Coordinates: 22°23′16.8″S 47°52′3.5″E

Ivato
- Interactive map of Ivato
- Country: Madagascar
- Region: Fitovinany
- District: Vohipeno

Population (2018)
  - Total: 2,698
- Time zone: UTC3 (EAT)
- postal code: 321

Ivato is a town and commune in Madagascar. It belongs to the district of Vohipeno, which is a part of the region of Fitovinany. The population of the commune was 2,698 in 2018.

It is situated at 40km from Manakara and 4 km from Vohipeno. It lies at the Matitanana river. It is the heart of the Antemoro people, particularly of its subtribe Anteony.

Primary and junior level secondary education are available in town. The majority 85% of the population of the commune are farmers. The most important crops are rice and oranges, while other important agricultural products are coffee and lychee. Services provide employment for 10% of the population. Additionally fishing employs 5% of the population.
