= Vohitrindry =

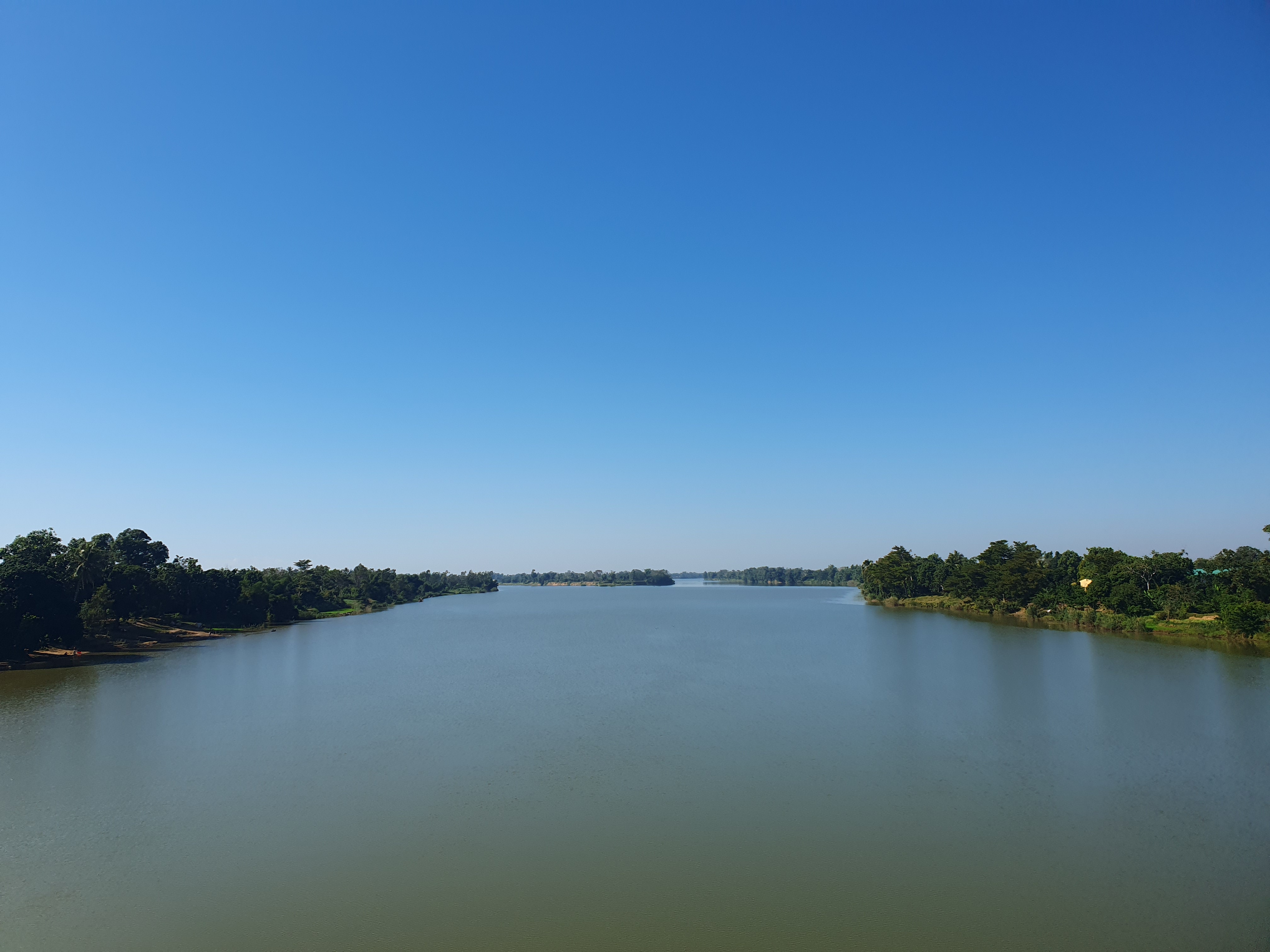
- The Matitanana at Vohitrindry

- Location in Madagascar
- Coordinates: 22°23′S 47°51′E
- Country: Madagascar
- Region: Fitovinany
- District: Vohipeno
- Elevation: 5 m (16 ft)

Population (2001)
  - Total: 13,000
- Time zone: UTC3 (EAT)
- Postal code: 321

Vohitrindry is a rural municipality in Madagascar on the East coast of Madagascar. It belongs to the district of Vohipeno, that is in Fitovinany. The population of the municipality was estimated to be approximately 13,000 in 2001.

Primary and junior level secondary education are familiar in this sector.The majority 98% of the population of the commune are depends on the agricultural activities. The most important crops are rice and coffee; also cassava is an important agricultural product. Services provide employment for 2% of the population.

== Infrastructure ==
Vohitrindry is situated at the banks of the Matitanana river and the crossroads of the National road 12 and National road 14
