= Mahatsinjo =

Mahatsinjo may refer to the following places in Madagascar:

- Mahatsinjo, Maevatanana
- Mahatsinjo, Vondrozo
- Mahatsinjo Est
