= Lucien Botovasoa =

Madagascan member of the Third order of Saint Francis

Blessed Lucien Botovasoa TOFS
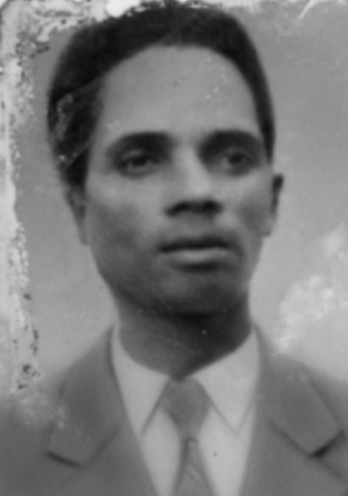

Martyr
- Born: 1908; Vohipeno, Madagascar
- Died: 14 April 1947 (aged 38–39); Ambohimanarivo, Manakara, Madagascar
- Venerated in: Roman Catholic Church
- Beatified: 15 April 2018, Vohipeno, Madagascar by Cardinal Maurice Piat
- Feast: 14 April

Lucien Botovasoa, TOFS (1908 – 14 April 1947) was a Malagasy Catholic schoolteacher and a member of the Secular Franciscan Order.

Botovasoa served as a teacher for his entire life and was dedicated to both the religious and secular education of children. His thirst for the religious life led him to discover the Secular Franciscan Order in 1940 and he became part of it; he rallied others to know Francis of Assisi and enter the order themselves. Botovasoa likewise adopted the Franciscan charism for himself through his fasting and clothing habits.

Botovasoa was murdered in 1947, during a period of tumult in Madagascar. His cause for canonization opened on 11 October 2011 under Pope Benedict XVI in which he became titled as a Servant of God. Pope Francis confirmed in mid-2017 that Botovasoa was killed in hatred of his faith and decreed that he was to be beatified; the ceremony was celebrated in Vohipeno on 15 April 2018.

== Life ==
Lucien Botovasoa was born sometime in 1908 in Madagascar as the first of nine brothers and sisters. One brother was André. Botovasoa studied first in a public school from 1918 before being baptized and receiving his First Communion in 1922,. He later completed his studies from 1922 until 1928 at the Jesuits' College of Saint Joseph before becoming an instructor there with his new teaching diploma. Botovasoa made it a practice after each lesson to read about the lives of the saints to those students who wanted to hear about them and he often added his own comments and words of encouragement to the students.

On 10 October 1930, Botovasoa married Suzanna Soazana (b. 1914) in his local parish and the pair had five children; his wife was pregnant with their final child at the time of Lucien's murder. His firstborn Vincent de Paul Hermann was born on 12 September 1931. One nun once said to him that he'd made a fine priest and asked him if he had ever regretted marriage. Botovasoa replied without hesitation: "I do not have the slightest regret at all" and further added it allowed him to serve God through that particular vocation.

Botovasoa was among the first to enter the Crusaders of the Heart of Jesus when the group arrived in his hometown of Vohipeno. He was received on 18 August 1935 before becoming the treasurer in 1936, a position he held until his death. In addition to his native tongue, Botovasoa had mastered the Chinese language as well as German and French. He was an exceptional singer and musician and even served as the director of the parish choir. He was described as an agile singer who never ceased smiling.

Botovasoa desired to become a religious, though was well aware of the fact that he could not while still married. He had no desire to leave his wife and children and instead sought to became a secular religious. He also looked for books on married saints but did not find any. In 1940, he discovered a handbook on the Secular Franciscan Order, which appealed to him immediately.

Secular orders were not present in Madagascar, so Botovasoa sought out people to join him in establishing a branch of the order in the region. He rallied one local woman and other companions to set up a branch. Botovasoa was vested in the habit and the order on 18 December 1944. His wife feared that he would abandon her to become a religious but he burst out laughing and assured her that this would not happen. Botovasoa often fasted and dressed in plain beige trousers and a khaki shirt, stressing that "it's the color of the clothes that tertiaries wear". His wife reproached him for not wearing black trousers, as was traditional for teachers, but he continued to tell her that this was insignificant in the face of his religious practices.

Into the New Year in 1947, a political organization wanted to present him as a candidate in an election but he refused, saying he deemed politics to be a strange and different realm that he did not want to associate himself with. However, there soon came great unrest in the region, in which priests and nuns were rounded up before a full uprising broke out. He accepted his father's invitation to return to his hometown on 30 March 1947, but returned home on 9 April after hearing of massacres near his home and the rounding up of the religious. Botovasoa was well aware that he could be captured and killed due to his status as a religious educator, but did not fear what would happen to him.

On 14 April Botovasoa was at home having lunch with his wife and children when a pious woman came and told him of rumors that a teacher was to be summoned before the chief, which prompted his wife to weep since she knew that it would be Botovasoa. He remained unmoved at the news and spoke with his wife of what might happen to him. He gave her last instructions for the care of their children and their unborn child. Four men knocked on his door at 9:00pm, requesting he go with them to see the chief who wished to judge him. He went with them and offered himself up for death without complaints. He was invited to sit and speak with the chief for half an hour. The chief pronounced the death sentence at 10:00pm and Botovasoa was led off to be executed.

Botovasoa was to be killed at the edge of the Matitanana river and en route asked to stop and reflect. He knelt for sometime in deep reflection before continuing along the path. Upon their arrival, his captors wanted to tie his hands together though he offered to do that himself in the form of a cross. He knelt at the edge of the water in contemplation, noting that the executioners were men that he himself had taught at school as students at some stage. The chief executioner beheaded Botovasoa with his sword and the others took turns striking a blow or wetting the sword in his blood before tossing his remains into the waters. Botovasoa died in his beige khaki jacket and trousers with a black cord for a belt.

== Beatification ==
The beatification process opened under Pope Benedict XVI on 11 October 2011 after the Congregation for the Causes of Saints issued the official "nihil obstat" (nothing against) to the cause and titled him as a Servant of God. The diocesan process of investigation opened in Farafangana on 7 September 2011 and was concluded there on 17 April 2013. The C.C.S. validated this process in Rome on 21 March 2014 before receiving the Positio in 2015 for investigation. Historians approved this dossier on 4 September 2015 as did the theologians on 8 November 2016 and the C.C.S. themselves on 2 May 2017.

Pope Francis approved the fact that Botovasoa was killed in hatred of his faith on 4 May 2017 and decreed that the late Franciscan was to be beatified which shall occur on 15 April 2018. Reports indicated that Botovasoa could be beatified that November but the national episcopal conference of Madagascar announced on 15 November that Botovasoa would be beatified on 15 April 2018; Cardinal Angelo Amato was to preside over the beatification in Vohipeno but Air France strikes prevented his presence. The cardinal's absence from the celebration enabled the Mauritian cardinal Maurice Piat to preside over the beatification on the pope's behalf in light of Amato not being able to preside himself.

The current postulator for this cause is Carlo Calloni.
