= Ankarimbelo =

- Location in Madagascar
- Coordinates: 22°8′S 47°20′E
- Country: Madagascar
- Region: Fitovinany
- District: Ikongo
- Elevation: 180 m (590 ft)

Population (2018)Census
  - Total: 1,995
- Time zone: UTC3 (EAT)
- Postal code: 310

Ankarimbelo is a rural municipality in Madagascar. It belongs to the district of Ikongo, which is in the Fitovinany region. The municipality has a population of 1,995 in 2018.

Primary and junior level secondary education are available in town. The majority 97% of the population of the commune are farmers. The most important crops are coffee and rice, while other important agricultural products are bananas and cassava. Services provide employment for 3% of the population.

== Rivers ==
It is situated at the Matatana river, an affluent of the Matitanana.
