= Ikongo District =

Ikongo
- District
- Country: Madagascar
- Region: Fitovinany

Area
  - Total: 2,795 km^{2} (1,079 sq mi)

Population (2018)
  - Total: 204,475
- postal code: 310

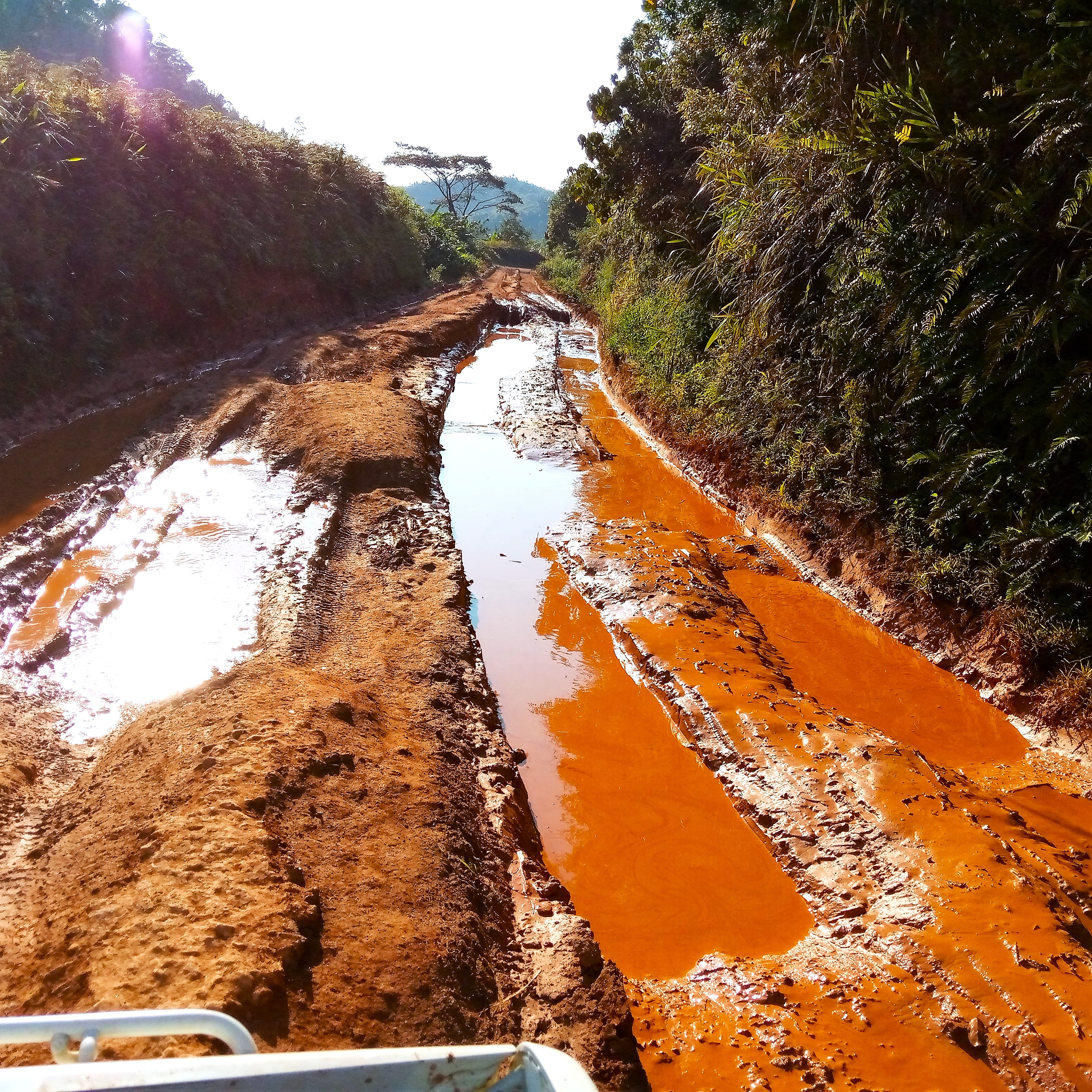
RN 14 between Ambiabe - Andefapony

Ikongo (formerly Fort Cannot) is a district of Fitovinany in Madagascar.

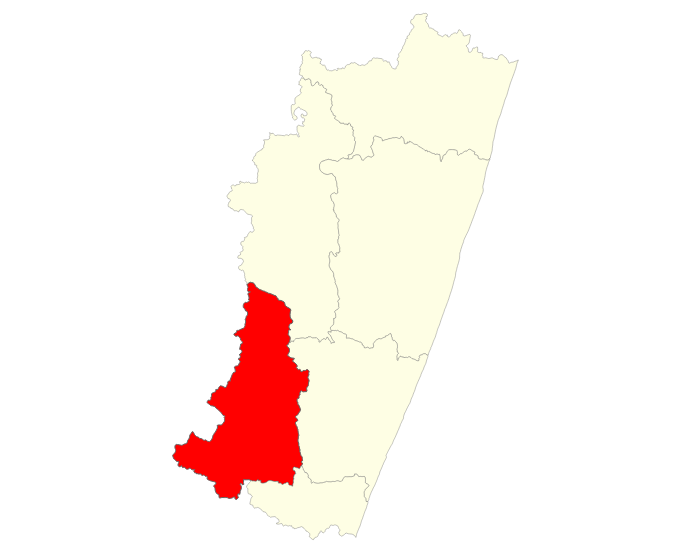
Ikongo District

== Communes ==
The district is further divided into 17 communes:

- Ambatofotsy
- Ambinanitromby
- Ambohimisafy
- Ambolomadinika
- Andefapony
- Ankarimbelo
- Antodinga
- Belemoka
- Ifanirea
- Ikongo
- Kalafotsy
- Manampatrana
- Maromiandra
- Sahalanona
- Tanakambana
- Tolongoina
- Tsifenokataka
