= Andefapony =

- Location in Madagascar
- Country: Madagascar
- Region: Fitovinany
- District: Ikongo

Population (2018)
  - Total: 5,053
- Time zone: UTC3 (EAT)
- Postal code: 310

21°28′01″S 47°32′20″E

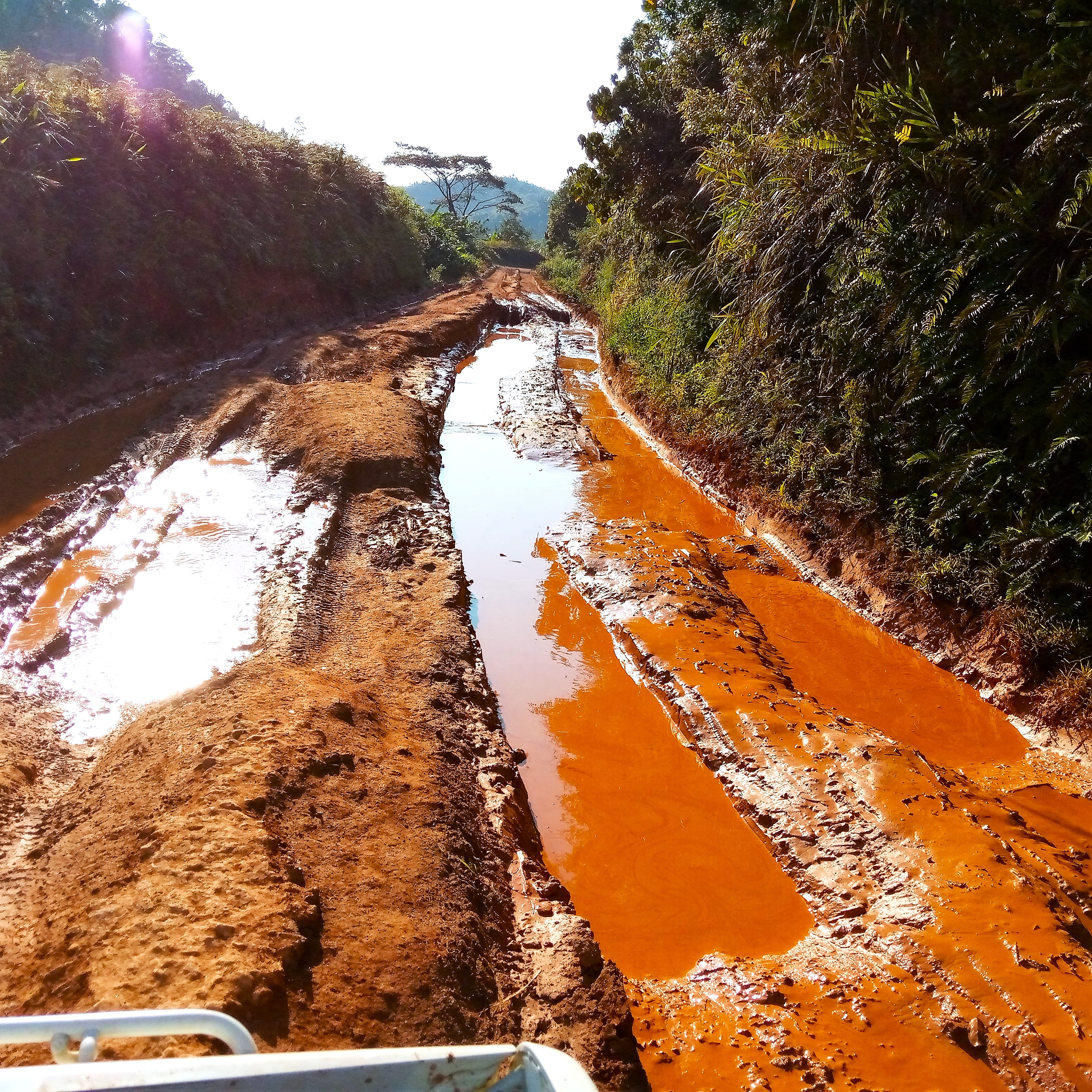
RN 14 Ambiabe - Andefapony

Andefapony is a rural commune in the region of Fitovinany eastern Madagascar. It has a population of 5,053 inhabitants.

This town is situated along the unpaved RN 14 and the Ionaivo River
