= Ikongo =

Ikongo Fort Canot
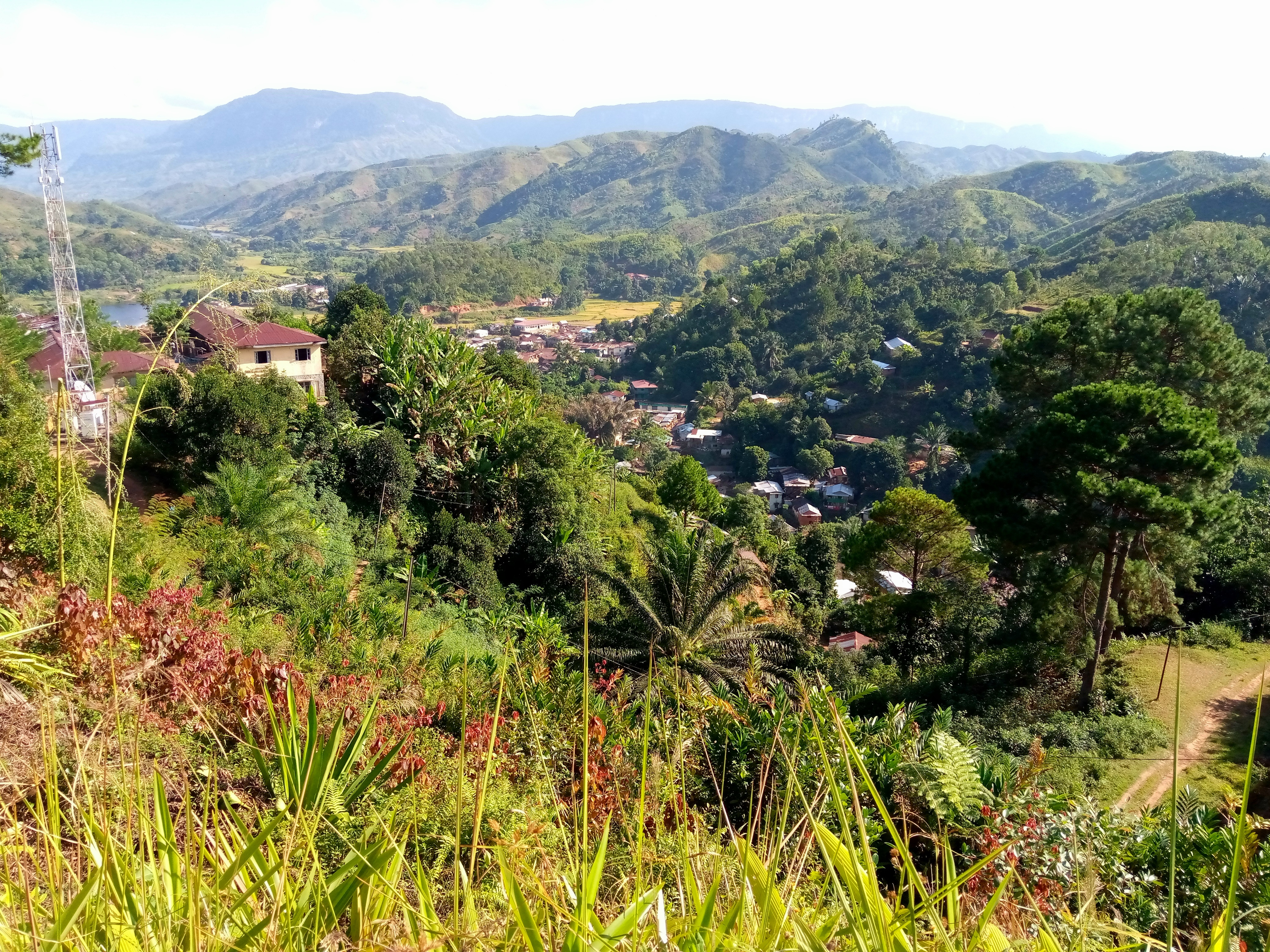
- Ikongo

- Location in Madagascar
- Coordinates: 21°53′S 47°26′E
- Country: Madagascar
- Region: Fitovinany
- District: Ikongo

Area
  - Total: 616 km^{2} (238 sq mi)
- Elevation: 310 m (1,020 ft)

Population (2018)
  - Total: 36,684
- Time zone: UTC3 (EAT)
- Postal code: 310

Ikongo (formerly: Fort Canot ) is a town in the region of Fitovinany eastern Madagascar. It is approximately 90 km south-east of the provincial capital Fianarantsoa. It has a population of 36,684 inhabitants.

== Rivers ==
The town lies at the Sandrananta River.

== Roads ==
Ikongo is situated on the unpaved National Road 14 between Ifanadiana (92 km) and Vohipeno.
