= Antananabo =

Village in Vohipeno District, Madagascar

- Rural municipality
- Location within Madagascar
- Coordinates: 22°25′28″S 47°43′34″E
- Country: Madagascar
- Region: Fitovinany
- District: Vohipeno
- Elevation: 24 m (79 ft)

Population (2018)
  - Total: 4,688
- Time zone: UTC+3 (EAT)
- Postal code: 321

Antananabo is a rural municipality in Vohipeno District, Fitovinany, Madagascar. As of the year 2018, there are 4,688 inhabitants within its borders.

== Geography ==
Antananabo is situated near the regional border with Atsimo-Atsinanana, about 43 kilometers southwest of the regional capital Manakara, and 14 kilometers southwest of the district capital Vohipeno. Its average elevation is at 24 meters above the sea level.

== Demographics ==
According to the 2018 census, Antananabo has a total of 846 households, with a 5.5 average household size. Out of the total 4,688 inhabitants, 2,332 are male and 2,356 are female.

== See also ==
- Vohipeno
