= Amborobe =

- Location in Madagascar
- Coordinates: 22°16′S 47°52′E
- Country: Madagascar
- Region: Fitovinany
- District: Vohipeno
- Elevation: 31 m (102 ft)

Population (2018)
  - Total: 4,586
- Time zone: UTC3 (EAT)
- Postal code: 321

Amborobe is a rural municipality in Madagascar. It belongs to the district of Vohipeno, which is a part of the region of Fitovinany. The population of the municipality was 4,586 in 2018.

This municipality is situated alongside National Road 12 North of Vohipeno.
