= Sahalava =

- Location in Madagascar
- Coordinates: 22°16′S 47°39′E
- Country: Madagascar
- Region: Fitovinany
- District: Vohipeno
- Elevation: 31 m (102 ft)

Population (2018)Census
  - Total: 1,414
- Time zone: UTC3 (EAT)
- Postal code: 321

Sahalava is a rural municipality in Madagascar. It belongs to the district of Vohipeno, which is a part of the region of Fitovinany. The population of the municipality was 1,414 inhabitants in 2018.

Only primary schooling is available. The majority 99.5% of the population of the commune are farmers. The most important crops are coffee and rice, while other important agricultural products are beans, lychee and cassava. Services provide employment for 0.5% of the population.

== Rivers ==
It is located on the banks of the river Matitanana.
