= Karianga =

- Location in Madagascar
- Coordinates: 22°25′S 47°22′E
- Country: Madagascar
- Region: Atsimo-Atsinanana
- District: Vondrozo
- Elevation: 263 m (863 ft)

Population (2001)
  - Total: 21,000
- Time zone: UTC3 (EAT)

Karianga is a town and commune in Madagascar. It belongs to the district of Vondrozo, which is a part of Atsimo-Atsinanana Region. The population of the commune was estimated to be approximately 21,000 in the 2001 commune census.

Primary and junior level secondary education are available in town. The majority 99.5% of the population of the commune are farmers. The most important crops are coffee and rice, while other important agricultural products are sugarcane and cassava. Services provide employment for 0.5% of the population.
