= Ilakatra =

- Location in Madagascar
- Coordinates: 22°21′S 47°40′E
- Country: Madagascar
- Region: Vatovavy-Fitovinany
- District: Vohipeno
- Elevation: 27 m (89 ft)

Population (2001)
  - Total: 17,000
- Time zone: UTC3 (EAT)

Ilakatra is a town and commune in Madagascar. It belongs to the district of Vohipeno, which is a part of Vatovavy-Fitovinany Region. The population of the commune was estimated to be approximately 17,000 in 2001 commune census.

Primary and junior level secondary education are available in town. The majority 99% of the population of the commune are farmers. The most important crop is rice, while other important products are coffee and cassava. Services provide employment for 1% of the population.
