= Vohilany =

- Interactive map of Vohilany
- Country: Madagascar
- Region: Vatovavy-Fitovinany
- District: Vohipeno

Population (2001)
  - Total: 8,000
- Time zone: UTC3 (EAT)

Vohilany is a town and commune in Madagascar. It belongs to the district of Vohipeno, which is a part of Vatovavy-Fitovinany Region. The population of the commune was estimated to be approximately 8,000 in 2001 commune census.

Only primary schooling is available. The majority 98.5% of the population of the commune are farmers. The most important crops are rice and cloves, while other important agricultural products are coffee and sweet potatoes. Services provide employment for 0.5% of the population. Additionally fishing employs 1% of the population.
