= Vondrozo District =

Vondrozo
- Location in Madagascar
- Coordinates: 22°49′S 47°20′E
- Country: Madagascar
- Region: Atsimo-Atsinanana
- District: Vondrozo

Area
  - Total: 3,200 km^{2} (1,200 sq mi)
- Elevation: 437 m (1,434 ft)

Population (2020)
  - Total: 174,769
  - Density: 55/km^{2} (140/sq mi)
- Time zone: UTC3 (EAT)
- Postal code: 322

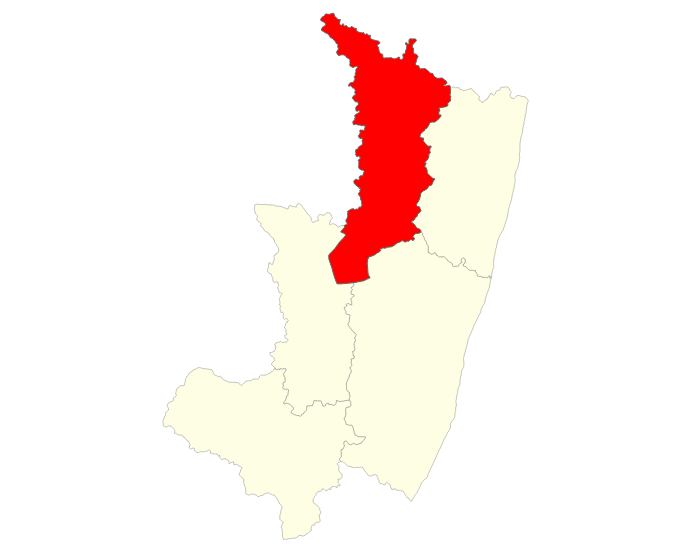
Map of the Vondrozo District

Vondrozo is a district of Atsimo-Atsinanana in Madagascar. The area is 3,200 km^{2} (1,236 sq mi) and the population was estimated to be 174,769 in 2020.

== Communes ==
The district is further divided into 16 communes:

- Ambohimana
- Anandravy
- Andakana
- Antokonala
- Iamonta
- Ivato
- Karianga
- Mahatsinjo
- Mahavelo
- Mahazoarivo
- Manambidala
- Manato
- Maroteza
- Vohiboreka
- Vohimary
- Vondrozo
