= Manambidala =

- Location in Madagascar
- Coordinates: 22°45′S 47°16′E
- Country: Madagascar
- Region: Atsimo-Atsinanana
- District: Vondrozo
- Elevation: 264 m (866 ft)

Population (2001)
  - Total: 13,000
- Time zone: UTC3 (EAT)

Manambidala is a town and commune in Madagascar. It belongs to the district of Vondrozo, which is a part of Atsimo-Atsinanana Region. The population of the commune was estimated to be approximately 13,000 in 2001 commune census.

Only primary schooling is available. The majority 98% of the population of the commune are farmers. The most important crops are coffee and beans, while other important agricultural products are peanuts, cassava and rice. Services provide employment for 2% of the population.
