= Tsifenokataka =

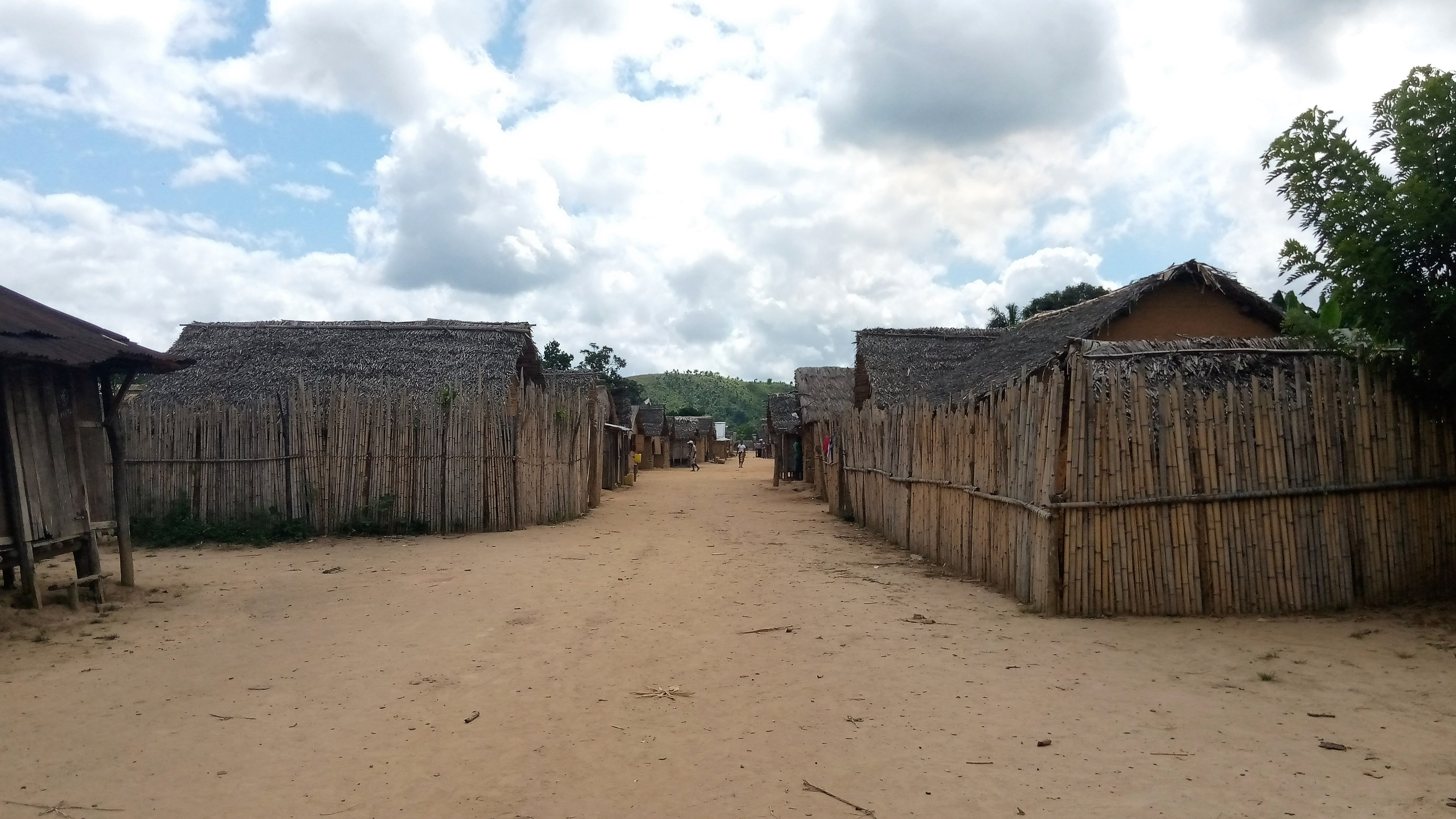
- The village of Tsifenokataka.

- Location in Madagascar
- Country: Madagascar
- Region: Fitovinany
- District: Ikongo

Population (2018)
  - Total: 2,604
- Time zone: UTC3 (EAT)
- Postal code: 310

Tsifenokataka is a rural commune in the region of Fitovinany eastern Madagascar in the former province of Fianarantsoa. It has a population of 2,604 inhabitants.
