= Savana =

- Location in Madagascar
- Coordinates: 22°23′S 47°54′E
- Country: Madagascar
- Region: Vatovavy-Fitovinany
- District: Vohipeno
- Elevation: 12 m (39 ft)

Population (2001)
  - Total: 4,000
- Time zone: UTC3 (EAT)

Savana is a town and commune in Madagascar. It belongs to the district of Vohipeno, which is a part of Vatovavy-Fitovinany Region. The population of the commune was estimated to be approximately 4,000 in the 2001 commune census.

Only primary schooling is not available. The majority (99% of the population) of the commune are farmers. The most important crop is rice, while other important products are coffee, lychee and cassava. Services provide employment for 0.1% of the population. Additionally, fishing employs 25% of the population.
