= Sahalanona =

- Location in Madagascar
- Coordinates: 22°3′S 47°37′E
- Country: Madagascar
- Region: Vatovavy-Fitovinany
- District: Ikongo
- Elevation: 167 m (548 ft)

Population (2001)
  - Total: 14,000
- Time zone: UTC3 (EAT)

Sahalanona is a town and commune in Madagascar. It belongs to the district of Ikongo, which is a part of Vatovavy-Fitovinany Region. The population of the commune was estimated to be approximately 14,000 in 2001 commune census.

Only primary schooling is available. The majority 95% of the population of the commune are farmers. The most important crops are coffee and rice; also cassava is an important agricultural product. Services provide employment for 5% of the population.
