= Zafindrafady =

Zafindrafady Ambodimanga
- Location in Madagascar
- Coordinates: 22°26′S 47°37′E
- Country: Madagascar
- Region: Fitovinany
- District: Vohipeno
- Elevation: 34 m (112 ft)

Population (2018)
  - Total: 8,395
- Time zone: UTC3 (EAT)
- Postal code: 321

Zafindrafady is a rural municipality in Madagascar. It belongs to the district of Vohipeno, which is a part of the region of Fitovinany. The population of the municipality was 8.395 in 2018.

Its seat is in Ambodimanga.
