= Antodinga =

- Location in Madagascar
- Coordinates: 22°09′S 47°25′E
- Country: Madagascar
- Region: Fitovinany
- District: Ikongo
- Elevation: 176 m (577 ft)

Population (2018)
  - Total: 15,977
- Time zone: UTC3 (EAT)
- Postal code: 310

Antodinga is a rural commune in the region of Fitovinany eastern Madagascar. It has a population of 15,979 inhabitants.
