= Vohipeno District =

Vohipeno
- Location in Madagascar
- Coordinates: 22°21′S 47°50′E
- Country: Madagascar
- Region: Fitovinany
- District: Vohipeno

Area
  - Total: 70 km^{2} (27 sq mi)
- Elevation: 6 m (20 ft)

Population (2018)
  - Total: 292,880
  - Ethnicities: Antemoro
- Time zone: UTC3 (EAT)
- Postal code: 321

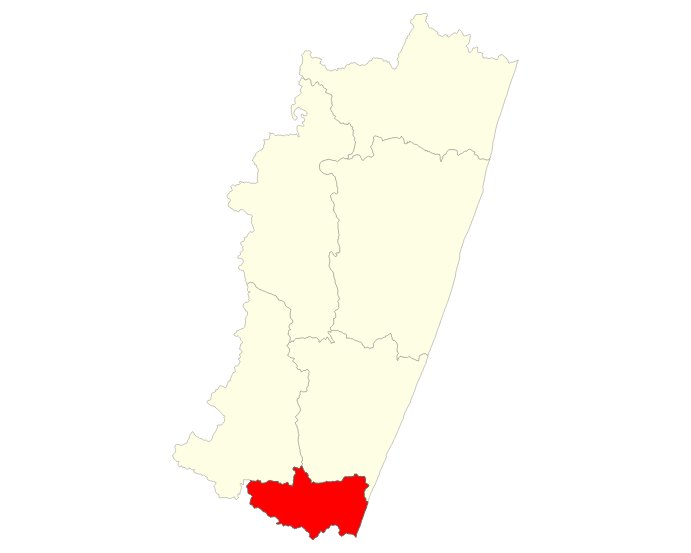
Location of the Vohipeno district in the Vatovavy-Fitovinany region

Vohipeno is a district of Vohipeno, which is a part of the region of Fitovinany, which is part of Madagascar. The population of the town was 14,751 in 2018, the population of the district was 292,880.

== Geography ==
Vohipeno is situated at 42 km from Manakara on the national road to Farafangana (RN 12). It is alongside the Matitanana river, also known as Matitana River.

== Communes ==
The district is further divided into 21 communes:

- Amborobe
- Andemaka
- Ankarimbary
- Anoloka
- Antananabo
- Ifatsy
- Ilakatra
- Ivato
- Lanivo
- Mahabo
- Mahasoabe
- Mahazoarivo
- Nato
- Onjatsy
- Sahalava
- Savana
- Vohilany
- Vohindava
- Vohipeno
- Vohitrindry
- Zafindrafady
