= Andakana =

- Location in Madagascar
- Coordinates: 22°31′S 47°27′E
- Country: Madagascar
- Region: Atsimo-Atsinanana
- District: Vondrozo
- Elevation: 111 m (364 ft)

Population (2001)
  - Total: 6,000
- Time zone: UTC3 (EAT)

Andakana is a town and commune in Madagascar. It belongs to the district of Vondrozo, which is a part of Atsimo-Atsinanana Region. The population of the commune was estimated to be approximately 6,000 in 2001 commune census.

Only primary schooling is available. The majority 99.5% of the population of the commune are farmers. The most important crop is rice, while other important products are bananas, coffee and cassava. Services provide employment for 0.5% of the population.
