= Ambinanitromby =

- Location in Madagascar
- Coordinates: 21°40′S 47°31′E
- Country: Madagascar
- Region: Fitovinany
- District: Ikongo
- Elevation: 215 m (705 ft)

Population (2018)
  - Total: 9,748
- Time zone: UTC3 (EAT)
- Postal code: 310

Ambinanitromby is a rural commune in the region of Fitovinany eastern Madagascar. It has a population of 9,748 inhabitants.

== Rivers ==
It is situated at the Faraony River.
