= Iamonta =

- Location in Madagascar
- Coordinates: 22°41′S 47°26′E
- Country: Madagascar
- Region: Atsimo-Atsinanana
- District: Vondrozo
- Elevation: 67 m (220 ft)

Population (2001)
  - Total: 6,000
- Time zone: UTC3 (EAT)

Iamonta is a town and commune in Madagascar. It belongs to the district of Vondrozo, which is a part of Atsimo-Atsinanana Region. The population of the commune was estimated to be approximately 6,000 in the 2001 commune census.

Only primary schooling is available. The majority (99%) of the population of the commune are farmers. The most important crops are rice and pepper, while other important agricultural products are coffee and cassava. Services provide employment for 1% of the population.
