= Lanivo =

- Location in Madagascar
- Coordinates: 22°17′S 47°49′E
- Country: Madagascar
- Region: Vatovavy-Fitovinany
- District: Vohipeno
- Elevation: 9 m (30 ft)

Population (2001)
  - Total: 9,000
- Time zone: UTC3 (EAT)

Lanivo is a town and commune in Madagascar in the district of Vohipeno, which is a part of Vatovavy-Fitovinany Region. The population of the commune was estimated to be approximately 9,000 in the 2001 commune census.

Primary is the only schooling available. 95% of the population are farmers and 4.7% raise livestock. The most important crop is coffee, followed by sugarcane, lychee, and rice. 0.2% of the population works in the service industry and 0.1% works in the fishing industry.
