= Ambolomadinika =

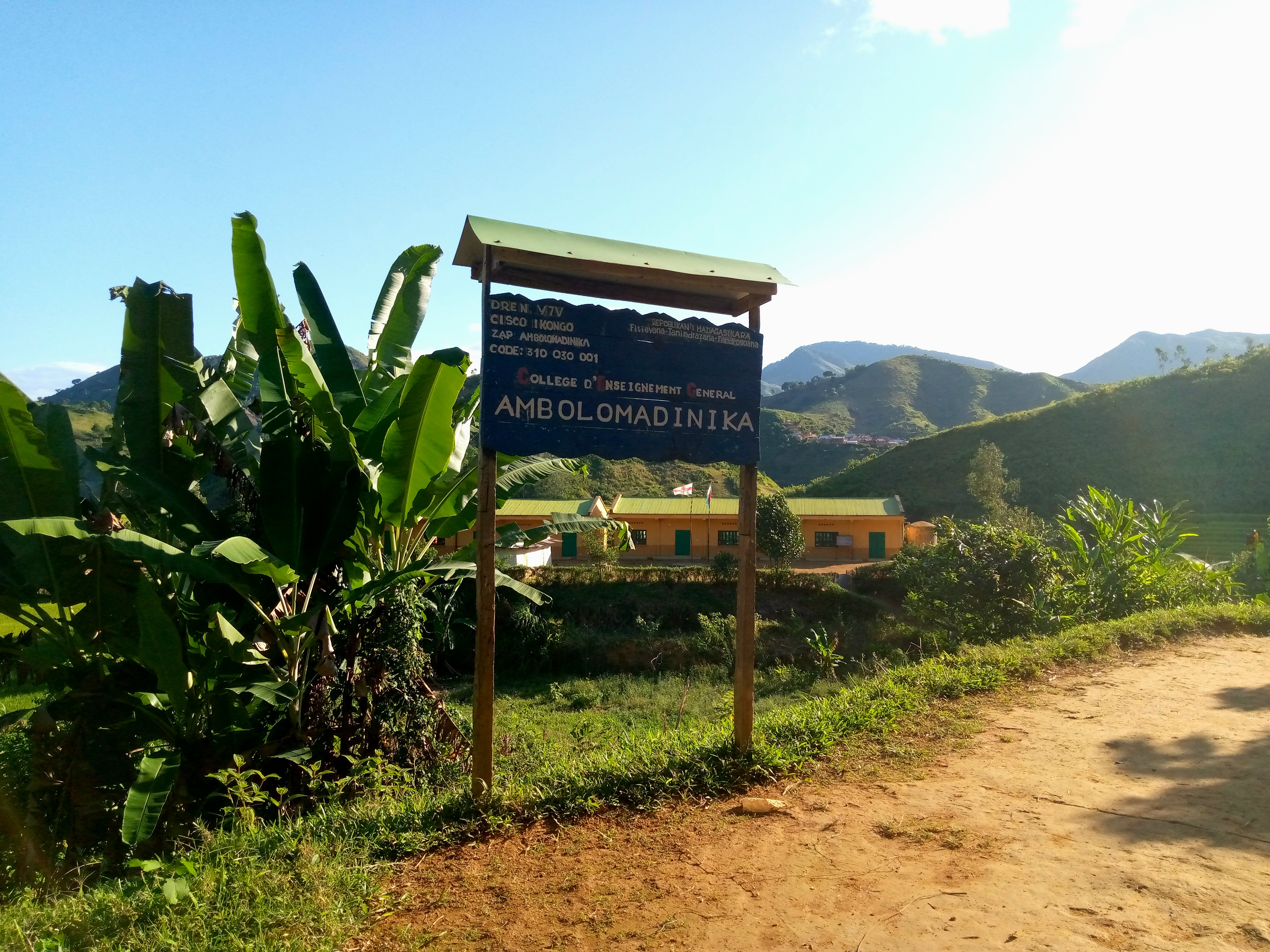
- The college of Ambolomadinika

- Location in Madagascar
- Coordinates: 21°57′S 47°26′E
- Country: Madagascar
- Region: Fitovinany
- District: Ikongo
- Elevation: 265 m (869 ft)

Population (2018)Census
  - Total: 17,616
- Time zone: UTC3 (EAT)
- Postal code: 310

Ambolomadinika is a rural municipality in Madagascar. It belongs to the district of Ikongo, which is a part of Fitovinany. The population numbered to 17,616 inhabitants in 2018.

Only primary schooling is available. The majority 98% of the population of the commune are farmers. The most important crops are coffee and rice, while other important agricultural products are bananas and cassava. Services provide employment for 2% of the population.

== River ==
It lies at the Sandrananta River.
