= Vohiboreka =

- Location in Madagascar
- Coordinates: 22°19′S 47°17′E
- Country: Madagascar
- Region: Atsimo-Atsinanana
- District: Vondrozo
- Elevation: 161 m (528 ft)

Population (2001)
  - Total: 4,000
- Time zone: UTC3 (EAT)

Vohiboreka is a town and commune in Madagascar. It belongs to the district of Vondrozo, which is a part of Atsimo-Atsinanana Region. The population of the commune was estimated to be approximately 4,000 in 2001 commune census.

Only primary schooling is available. The majority 99.5% of the population of the commune are farmers. The most important crops are coffee and cassava, while other important agricultural products are sugarcane and rice. Services provide employment for 0.5% of the population.
