= Ifatsy =

- Location in Madagascar
- Coordinates: 22°24′S 47°45′E
- Country: Madagascar
- Region: Fitovinany
- District: Vohipeno
- Elevation: 20 m (66 ft)

Population (2001)
  - Total: 15,000
- Time zone: UTC3 (EAT)
- Postal code: 321

Ifatsy is a rural municipality in Madagascar. It belongs to the district of Vohipeno, which is a part of Fitovinany. The population of the commune was estimated to be approximately 15,000 in 2001 commune census.

Primary and junior level secondary education are available in town. The majority 93% of the population of the commune are farmers, while an additional 5% receives their livelihood from raising livestock. The most important crops are coffee and oranges, while other important agricultural products are cassava, rice and cloves. Services provide employment for 2% of the population.
