= Vohindava =

- Location in Madagascar
- Coordinates: 22°25′S 47°52′E
- Country: Madagascar
- Region: Vatovavy-Fitovinany
- District: Vohipeno
- Elevation: 11 m (36 ft)

Population (2001)
  - Total: 12,000
- Time zone: UTC3 (EAT)

Vohindava is a town and commune in Madagascar. It belongs to the district of Vohipeno, which is a part of Vatovavy-Fitovinany Region. The population of the commune was estimated to be approximately 12,000 in 2001 commune census.

Primary and junior level secondary education are available in town. The majority 78% of the population of the commune are farmers. The most important crops are rice and sugarcane, while other important agricultural products are coffee, lychee and cassava. Services provide employment for 2% of the population. Additionally fishing employs 20% of the population.
