= Kalafotsy =

- Location in Madagascar
- Coordinates: 22°17′S 47°19′E
- Country: Madagascar
- Region: Vatovavy-Fitovinany
- District: Ikongo
- Elevation: 305 m (1,001 ft)

Population (2001)
  - Total: 11,000
- Time zone: UTC3 (EAT)

Kalafotsy is a town and commune in Madagascar. It belongs to the district of Ikongo, which is a part of Vatovavy-Fitovinany Region. The population of the commune was estimated to be approximately 11,000 in 2001 commune census.

Only primary schooling is available. The majority 99% of the population of the commune are farmers. The most important crops are coffee and rice, while other important agricultural products are sugarcane and cassava. Services provide employment for 1% of the population.
