= Tanakambana =

- Location in Madagascar
- Coordinates: 22°3′S 47°29′E
- Country: Madagascar
- Region: Vatovavy-Fitovinany
- District: Ikongo
- Elevation: 150 m (490 ft)

Population (2001)
  - Total: 9,000
- Time zone: UTC3 (EAT)

Tanakambana is a town and commune in Madagascar. It belongs to the district of Ikongo, which is a part of Vatovavy-Fitovinany Region. The population of the commune was estimated to be approximately 9,000 in 2001 commune census.

Only primary schooling is available. The most important crops are coffee and rice, while other important agricultural products are bananas, sugarcane and cassava.
