= Vohimary =

- Location in Madagascar
- Coordinates: 22°58′S 47°17′E
- Country: Madagascar
- Region: Atsimo-Atsinanana
- District: Vondrozo
- Elevation: 200 m (660 ft)

Population (2001)
  - Total: 5,000
- Time zone: UTC3 (EAT)

Vohimary is a town and commune in Madagascar. It belongs to the district of Vondrozo, which is a part of Atsimo-Atsinanana Region. The population of the commune was estimated to be approximately 5,000 in 2001 commune census.

Only primary schooling is available. The most important crop is rice, while other important products are bananas, coffee and cassava. Services provide employment for 1% of the population.
