= Ifanirea =

- Location in Madagascar
- Coordinates: 22°11′S 47°28′E
- Country: Madagascar
- Region: Vatovavy-Fitovinany
- District: Ikongo
- Elevation: 85 m (279 ft)

Population (2001)
  - Total: 19,000
- Time zone: UTC3 (EAT)

Ifanirea is a town and commune in Madagascar. It belongs to the district of Ikongo, which is a part of Vatovavy-Fitovinany Region. The population of the commune was estimated to be approximately 19,000 in 2001 commune census.

Primary and junior level secondary education are available in town. The majority 95% of the population of the commune are farmers. The most important crops are coffee and rice, while other important agricultural products are bananas and cassava. Services provide employment for 5% of the population.

== Rivers ==
Ifanirea is located at the Matitanana river.
