= Antokonala =

- Location in Madagascar
- Coordinates: 23°0′S 47°22′E
- Country: Madagascar
- Region: Atsimo-Atsinanana
- District: Vondrozo
- Elevation: 150 m (490 ft)

Population (2001)
  - Total: 3,870
- Time zone: UTC3 (EAT)

Antokonala is a town and commune in Madagascar. It belongs to the district of Vondrozo, which is a part of Atsimo-Atsinanana Region. The population of the commune was estimated to be approximately 3,870 in 2001 commune census.

The commune has its own ministry of education, but it only offers primary schooling services. The commune also has a private clinic, as well as a provincial road that runs through it. According to the commune census, 99% of the population are farmers. The most produced and valuable crop is rice, while bananas, coffee and cassava are also harvested. Services provide employment for an estimated 1% of the population.
