= Andemaka =

- Location in Madagascar
- Coordinates: 22°18′S 47°45′E
- Country: Madagascar
- Region: Vatovavy-Fitovinany
- District: Vohipeno
- Elevation: 11 m (36 ft)

Population (2001)
  - Total: 16,000
- Time zone: UTC3 (EAT)

Andemaka is a town and commune in Madagascar. It belongs to the district of Vohipeno, which is a part of Vatovavy-Fitovinany Region. The population of the commune was estimated to be approximately 16,000 in 2001 commune census.

Primary and junior level secondary education are available in town. The majority 73% of the population of the commune are farmers, while an additional 15% receives their livelihood from raising livestock. The most important crop is rice, while other important products are coffee and sugarcane. Industry and services provide employment for 0.1% and 9.9% of the population, respectively. Additionally fishing employs 2% of the population.

== Rivers ==
In Andemaka the Sandrananta River flows into the Matitanana.
