= Ankarimbary =

- Location in Madagascar
- Coordinates: 22°25′S 47°53′E
- Country: Madagascar
- Region: Vatovavy-Fitovinany
- District: Vohipeno
- Elevation: 4 m (13 ft)

Population (2001)
  - Total: 8,000
- Time zone: UTC3 (EAT)

Ankarimbary is a town and commune in Madagascar. It belongs to the district of Vohipeno, which is a part of Vatovavy-Fitovinany Region. The population of the commune was estimated to be approximately 8,000 in 2001 commune census.

Only primary schooling is available. The majority 94% of the population of the commune are farmers, while an additional 4% receives their livelihood from raising livestock. The most important crops are rice and coffee, while other important agricultural products are lychee and cassava. Services provide employment for 1% of the population. Additionally fishing employs 1% of the population.
