= Mahabo, Vohipeno =

Mahabo
- Location in Madagascar
- Coordinates: 22°20′S 47°46′E
- Country: Madagascar
- Region: Vatovavy-Fitovinany
- District: Vohipeno
- Elevation: 14 m (46 ft)

Population (2001)
  - Total: 4,000
- Time zone: UTC3 (EAT)

Mahabo is a town and commune in Madagascar. It belongs to the district of Vohipeno, which is a part of Vatovavy-Fitovinany Region. The population of the commune was estimated to be approximately 4,000 in 2001 commune census.

There are just elementary school options. 99% of the people living in the commune are farmers, while a further 0.5% make their living by keeping cattle. The most important crop is coffee, while other important products are cabbage, cassava and rice. Services provide employment for 0.4% of the population. Additionally fishing employs 0.1% of the population.
