= Ambohimisafy =

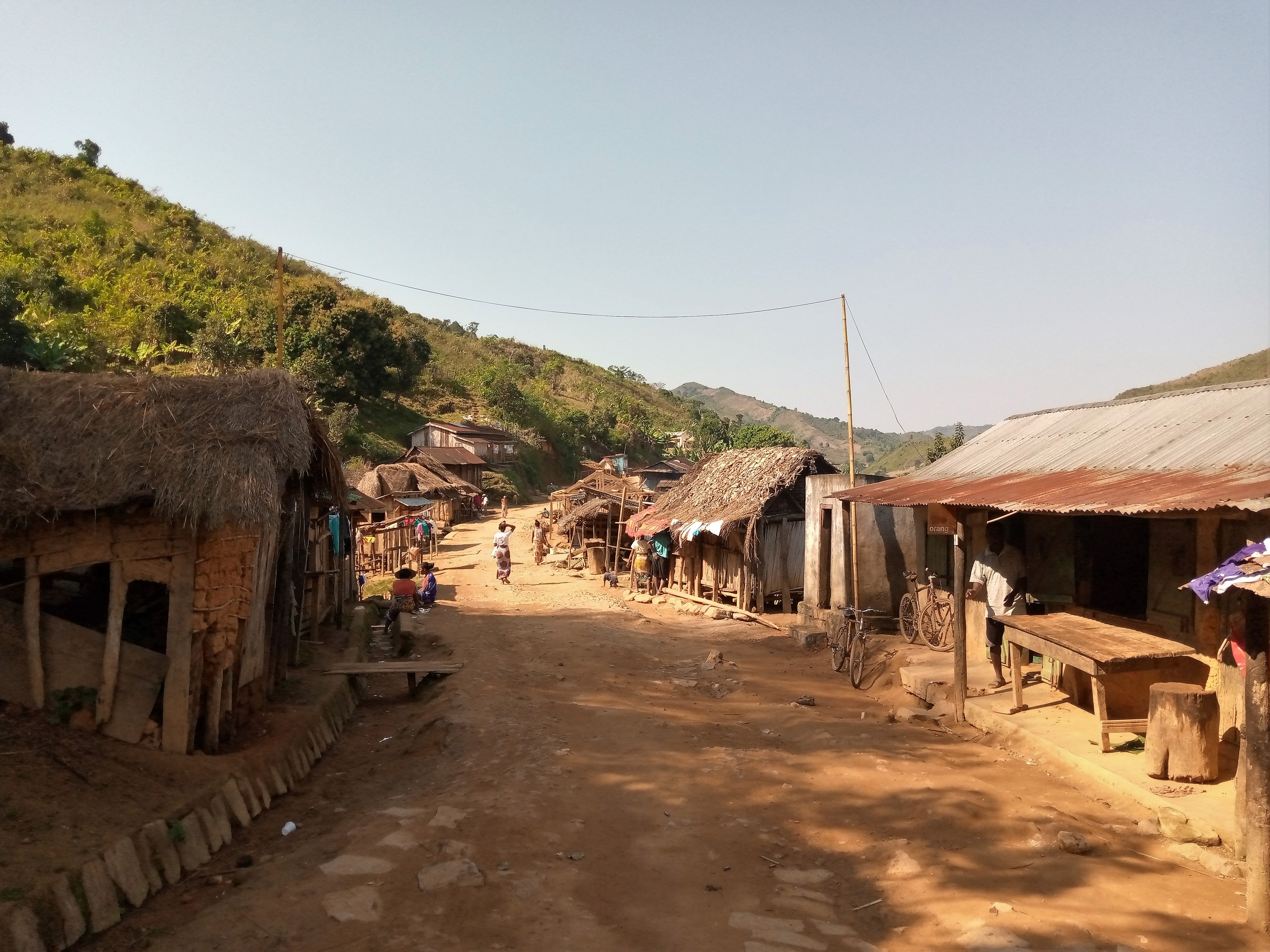
- Ambohimisafy

- Location in Madagascar
- Coordinates: 21°31′S 47°32′E
- Country: Madagascar
- Region: Fitovinany
- District: Ikongo
- Elevation: 459 m (1,506 ft)

Population (2018)Census
  - Total: 3,281
- Time zone: UTC3 (EAT)

Ambohimisafy is a rural municipality in Madagascar. It belongs to the district of Ikongo, which is a part of Fitovinany. The population of this municipality is 3,281 inhabitants in 2018.

Only primary schooling is available. The majority 98% of the population of the commune are farmers. The most important crops are coffee and bananas, while other important agricultural products are cassava and rice. Services provide employment for 2% of the population.

It is situated at the Faraony River.
