= Maroteza =

- Location in Madagascar
- Coordinates: 22°18′S 47°12′E
- Country: Madagascar
- Region: Atsimo-Atsinanana
- District: Vondrozo
- Elevation: 256 m (840 ft)

Population (2001)
  - Total: 18,000
- Time zone: UTC3 (EAT)

Maroteza is a town and commune in Madagascar. It belongs to the district of Vondrozo, which is a part of Atsimo-Atsinanana Region. The population of the commune was estimated to be approximately 18,000 in 2001 commune census.

Only primary schooling is available. The majority 99% of the population of the commune are farmers. The most important crops are coffee and rice, while other important agricultural products are bananas, sugarcane and cassava. Services provide employment for 1% of the population.
