= Mahasoabe, Vohipeno =

Mahasoabe
- Location in Madagascar
- Coordinates: 22°16′S 47°46′E
- Country: Madagascar
- Region: Fitovinany
- District: Vohipeno

Government
  - Mayor: Michel Rakotonirina
- Elevation: 12 m (39 ft)

Population (2001)
  - Total: 7,000
- Time zone: UTC3 (EAT)
- Postal code: 321

Mahasoabe is a municipality in Madagascar. It belongs to the district of Vohipeno, which is a part of Fitovinany. The population of the commune was estimated to be approximately 7,000 in 2001 commune census.

Only primary schooling is available. The majority 90% of the population of the commune are farmers, while an additional 2% receives their livelihood from raising livestock. The most important crop is coffee, while other important products are sugarcane, cassava and rice. Services provide employment for 1% of the population. Additionally fishing employs 7% of the population.
