= Mahazoarivo, Vohipeno =

Mahazoarivo
- Location in Madagascar
- Coordinates: 22°19′S 47°35′E
- Country: Madagascar
- Region: Vatovavy-Fitovinany
- District: Vohipeno
- Elevation: 77 m (253 ft)

Population (2001)
  - Total: 19,000
- Time zone: UTC3 (EAT)

Mahazoarivo is a town and commune in Madagascar. It belongs to the district of Vohipeno, which is a part of Vatovavy-Fitovinany Region. The population of the commune was estimated to be approximately 19,000 in 2001 commune census.

Only primary schooling is available. The majority 90% of the population of the commune are farmers. The most important crops are rice and beans, while other important agricultural products are pineapple, bananas and coffee. Services provide employment for 10% of the population.
