= Ambiabe =

- Location in Madagascar
- Coordinates: 21°23′S 47°36′E
- Country: Madagascar
- Region: Vatovavy
- District: Ifanadiana

Population (2018)
  - Total: 7,945
- Time zone: UTC3 (EAT)
- postal code: 312

Ambiabe is a town and commune in Madagascar. It belongs to the district of Ifanadiana, which is a part of the region Vatovavy. The population of the commune was estimated 7,945 in 2018.
