= Sandrananta River =

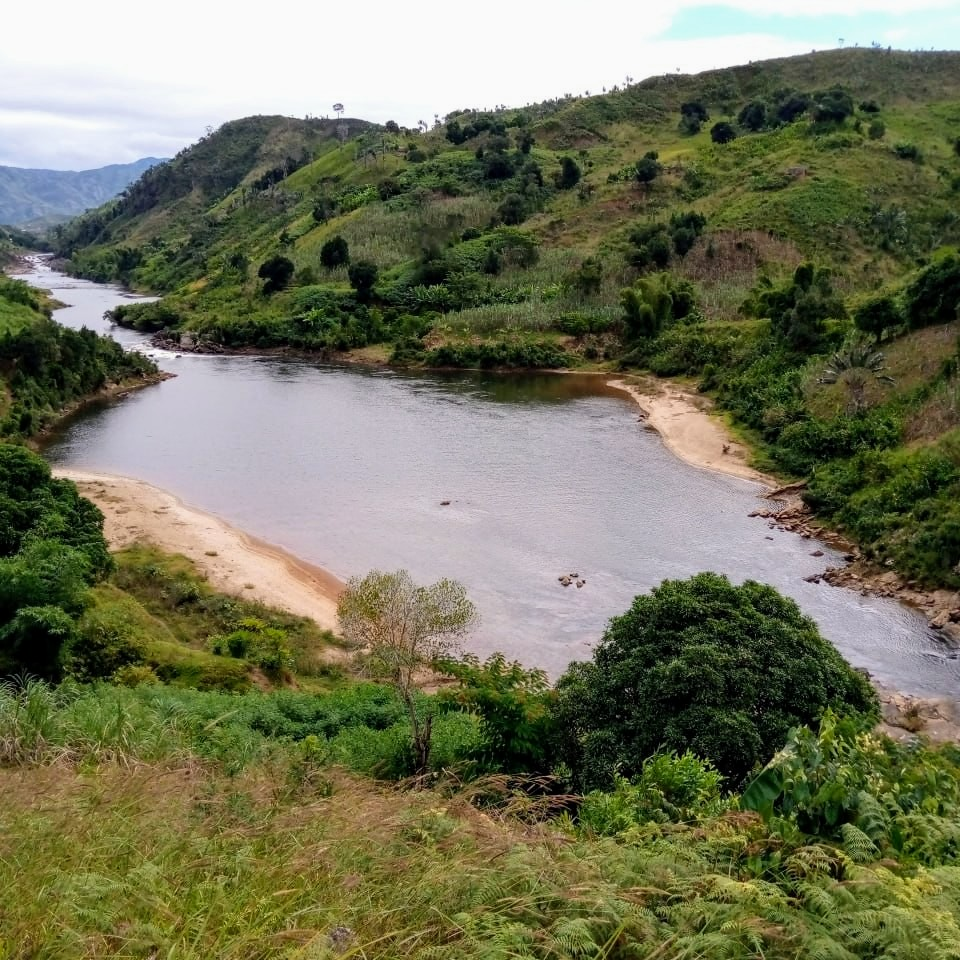
- The Sandranata river east of Ambolomadinika

Location
- Country: Madagascar

Physical characteristics
- Mouth
  - location: Matitanana
  - coordinates: 22°25′53.4″S 47°54′38″E
  - elevation: 0 m (0 ft)

Basin features
- Progression: Ikongo, Andemaka

The Sandrananta River is a river on the east coast of Madagascar. Its mouth is located on the Matitanana river near the town of Andemaka in the Fitovinany region.

The river is vulnerable to flooding after extreme weather events. In 2023, the river overflowed its banks after tropical storm "Freddy", flooding nearby agricultural fields. The following year, the river again flooded, after being impacted by tropical cyclone ALVARO‑24.
