= Vohipeno =

Vohipeno Ambohipeno
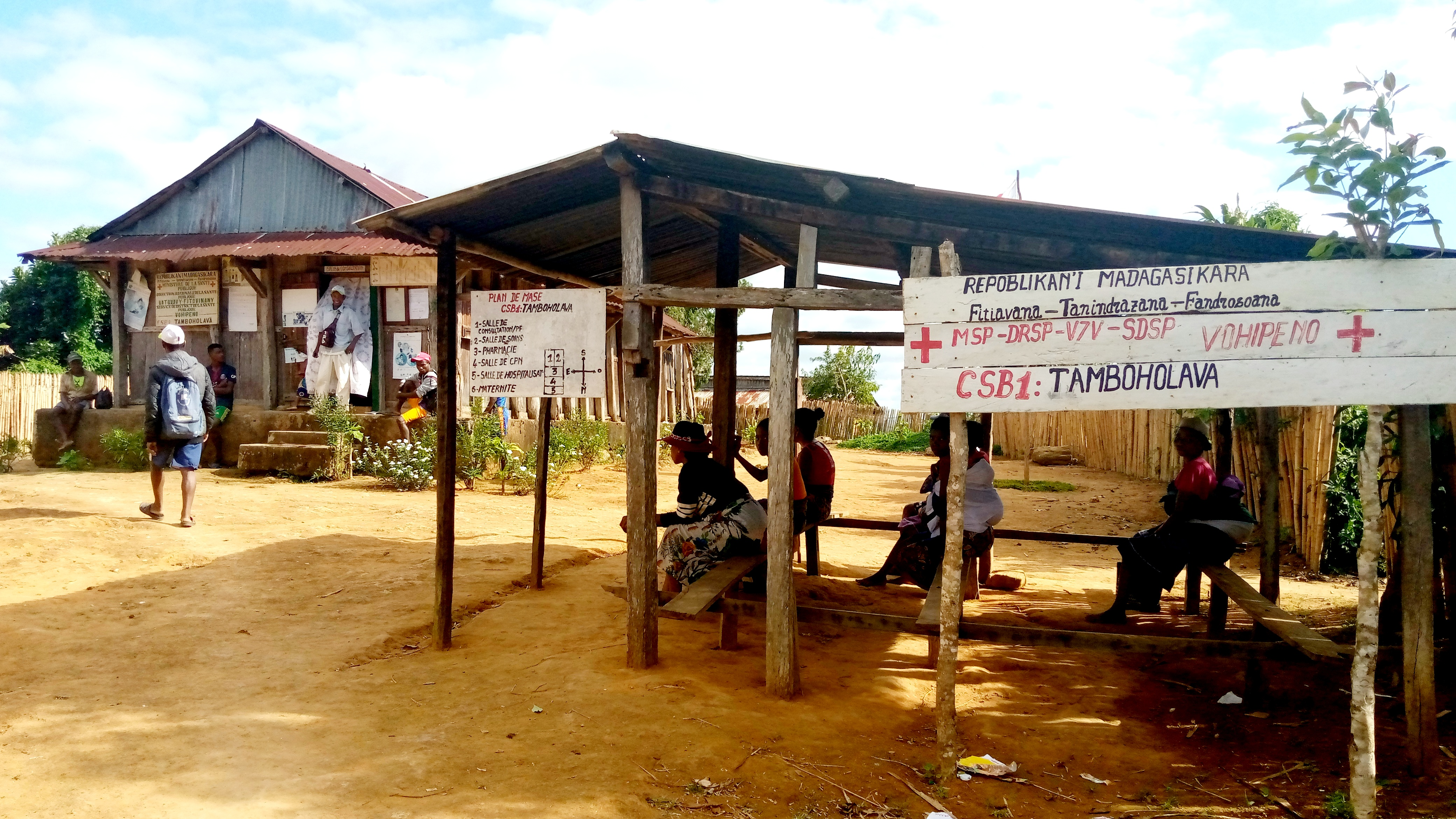
- The health center in Tamboholava, a village of Vohipeno

- Location in Madagascar
- Coordinates: 22°21′S 47°50′E
- Country: Madagascar
- Region: Fitovinany
- District: Vohipeno

Area
  - Total: 70 km^{2} (27 sq mi)
- Elevation: 6 m (20 ft)

Population (2018)
  - Total: 14,751
  - Ethnicities: Antemoro
- Time zone: UTC3 (EAT)
- Postal code: 321

Vohipeno is a rural municipality in Madagascar. It belongs to the district of Vohipeno, which is a part of the region of Fitovinany. The population of the commune was 14,751 in 2018.

In addition to primary schooling the town offers secondary education at both junior and senior levels. The town provides access to hospital services to its citizens. The majority 98% of the population of the commune are farmers. The most important crops are rice and coffee, while other important agricultural products are lychee and cassava. 1.6 percent of the population is employed in service industries, and 0.5 percent in fishing.

== Geography ==
Vohipeno is situated on the RN 12 at 42 km from Manakara and 22km from Farafangana. It is located at the Sandrananta River near its mouth into the Indian Ocean.

== Notable people ==
- Lucien Botovasoa, beatified schoolteacher, assassinated in 1947.
