= Matitanana =

River in Madagascar

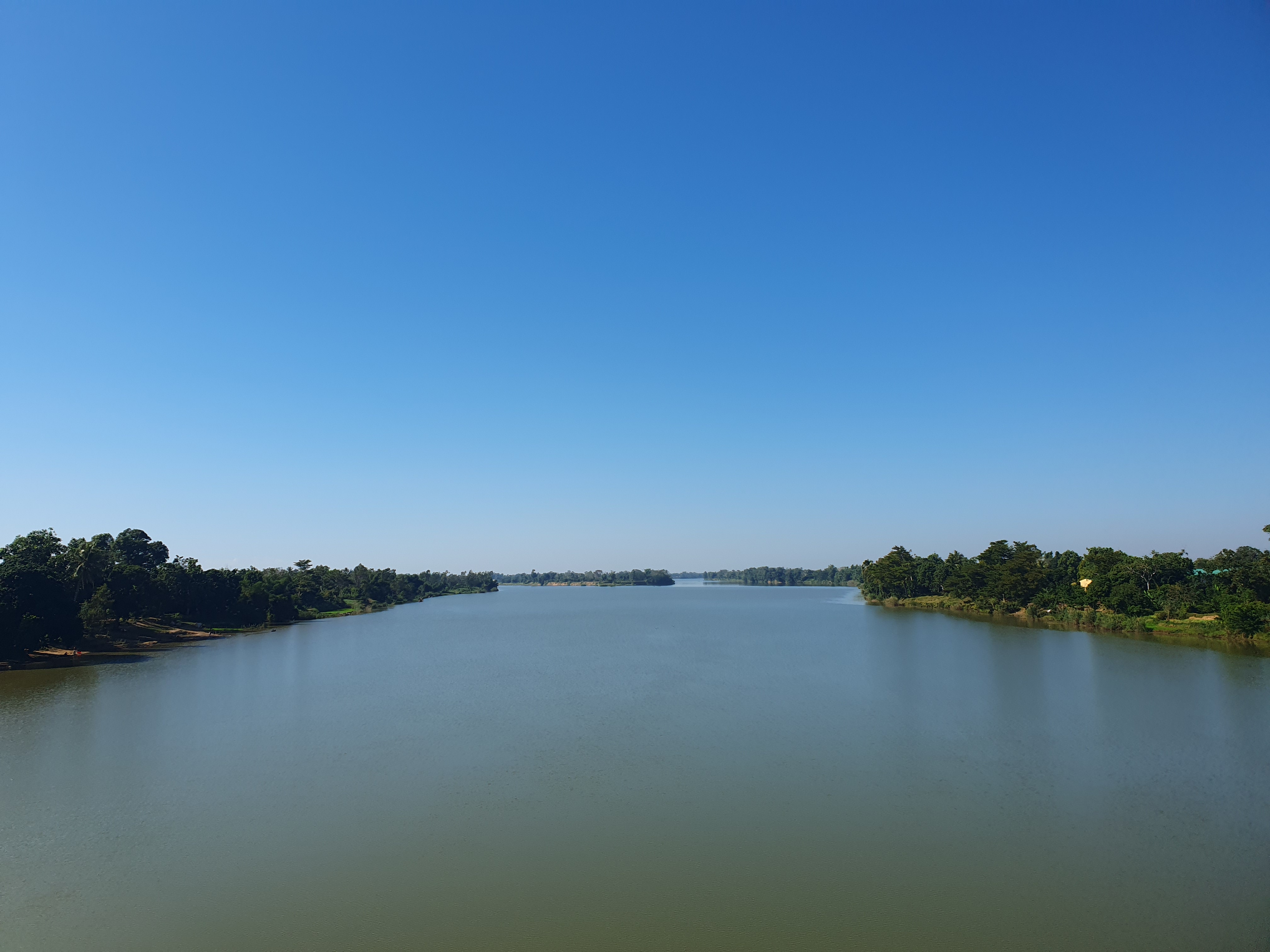
- Matitanana

- Map of Malagasy rivers.

Location
- Country: Madagascar
- Region: Fitovinany

Physical characteristics
- Mouth
  - location: Indian Ocean, near Vohipeno
  - coordinates: 22°25′00″S 47°55′00″E
- Length: 140 km (87 mi)
- Basin size: 4395 km2

Basin features
- Progression: Ifanirea, Andemaka, Vohipeno
- Tributaries
  - left: Sandrananta River
  - right: Rienana, Matatana

The Matitanana river in Fitovinany region, is located in eastern Madagascar. It flows into the Indian Ocean near Vohipeno.

== Falls ==
- Ankitso falls
