= Dyscophus antongilii =

Conservation status
- Least Concern (IUCN 3.1)
- CITES Appendix II

Scientific classification
- Kingdom: Animalia
- Phylum: Chordata
- Class: Amphibia
- Order: Anura
- Family: Microhylidae
- Genus: Dyscophus
- Species: D. antongilii

Binomial name
- Dyscophus antongilii Grandidier, 1877
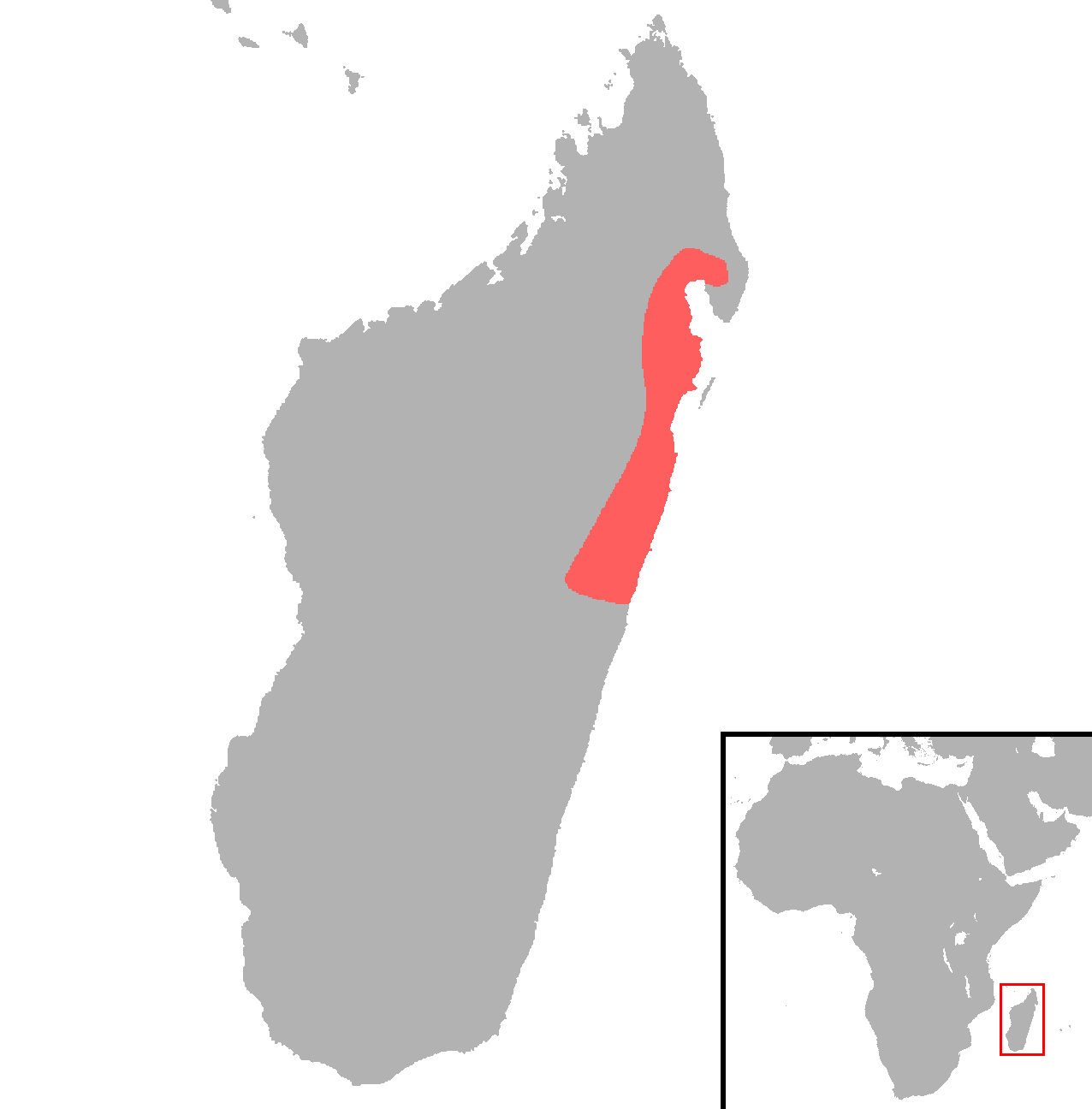

Species of frog

Dyscophus antongilii, the Madagascar tomato frog, or simply tomato frog, is a species of frog in the family Microhylidae.

== Description ==
Females are much larger than males, reaching up to 10.5 cm and 230 g in weight (6.5 cm and 41 g for males). Tomato frogs live up to their name by possessing a vibrant, orange-red colour. Females have brighter tones of red or orange on their back, with a pale undersurface. Some individuals also have black spots on the throat. It is thought that the brilliant colours of the tomato frog act as a warning to potential predators that these frogs are toxic; a white substance secreted from the skin acts as a glue to deter predators (such as colubrid snakes) and can produce an allergic reaction in humans.

== Habitat and distribution ==
Endemic to Madagascar, tomato frogs are found in the northeast of the island around Antongil Bay (from which they gain their specific name, antongilii), and south to Andevoranto. The exact distribution of this species is unclear however, due to confusion with the closely related D. guineti.

The tomato frog breeds in shallow pools, swamps and areas of slow-moving water. These frogs are found from sea level to elevations of around 200 metres. Its natural habitats are subtropical or tropical moist lowland forests, rivers, swamps, freshwater marshes, intermittent freshwater marshes, arable land, plantations, rural gardens, urban areas, heavily degraded former forest, ponds, and canals and ditches.

== Life cycle and ecology ==
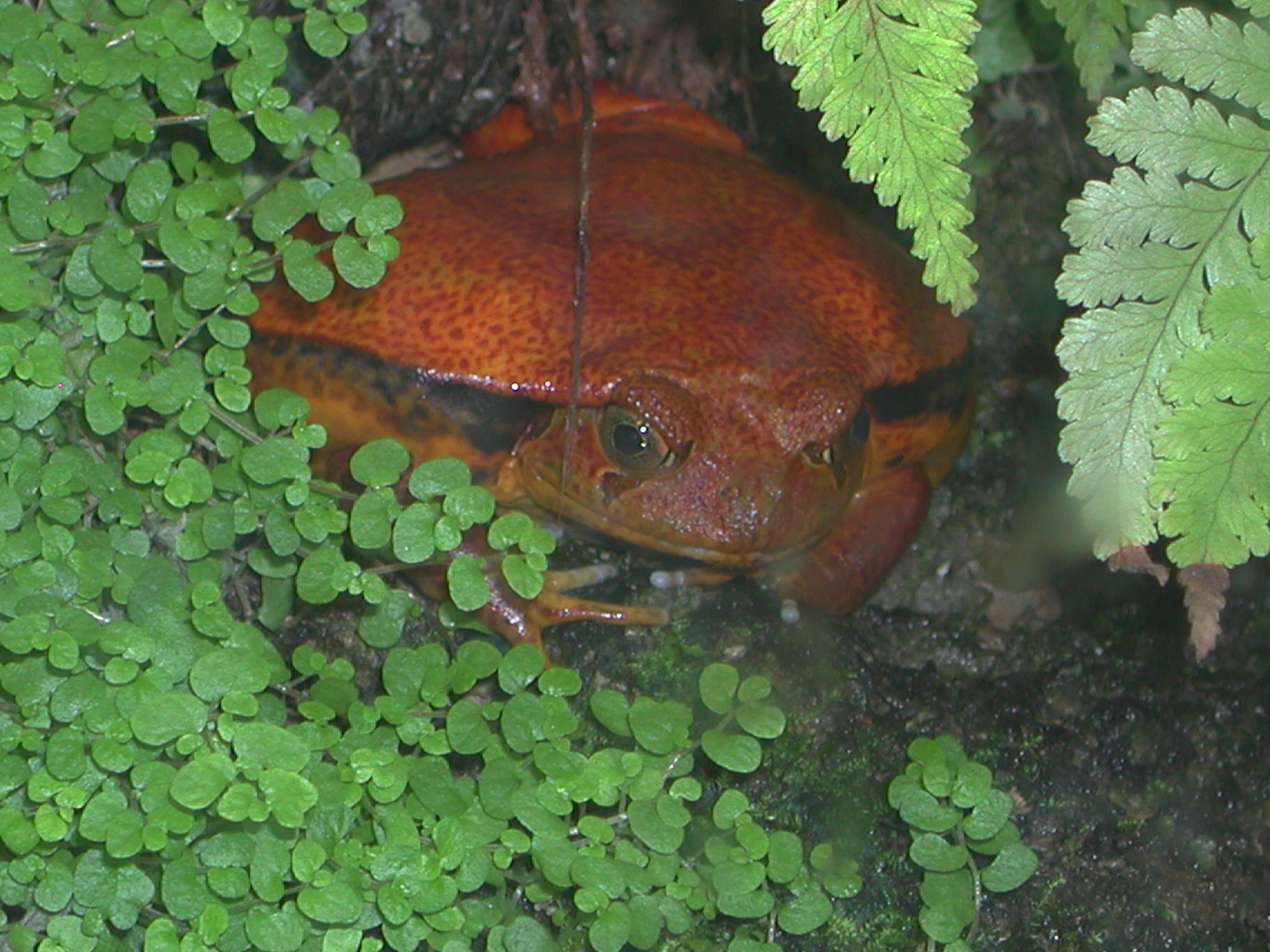
Tomato Frog at Dählhölzli Animal Park

Tomato frogs breed in February to March following heavy rainfall; the sounds of males calling to attract females can be heard around small water bodies in the dark Malagasy night. Following copulation, females will lay a clutch of 1,000 to 1,500 eggs on the surface of the water. Tadpoles hatch from these small black and white eggs about 36 hours later; they are only around six millimetres long and feed by filter-feeding. Tadpoles undergo metamorphosis into yellow juveniles and this stage is completed around 45 days after the eggs were laid.

Ambushing potential prey, adult tomato frogs feed on small invertebrates, such as beetles, mosquitoes, and flies. When threatened, these frogs can inflate themselves, giving the appearance of greater size.

== Threats and conservation ==
The tomato frog is classified as Least Concern (LC) on the IUCN Red List, and listed on Appendix II of CITES. Numbers of the tomato frog have been declining as a result of habitat degradation and pollution and the over-collection of these brightly coloured amphibians for the pet trade. Collecting activity, and the associated decline in population, was predominately focused near to the town of Maroantsetra. The tomato frog was rapidly included on Appendix I of the Convention on International Trade in Endangered Species (CITES) in response to this pressure.

Research into captive breeding techniques for the tomato frog has been carried out by Baltimore Zoo in the United States in an effort to boost the currently small and genetically deprived captive population that exists in that country. A consortium of U.S. zoos that form the Madagascar Fauna Group (MFG) have established an exhibit at the Parc Zoologique Ivoloina, Madagascar in an attempt to help educate local people about this attractive member of their natural heritage. Very little is known about the tomato frog and further research into its distribution, behaviour and potential threats is urgently needed before effective conservation measures can be put into place. It is currently listed on Appendix II of the Convention on International Trade in Endangered Species (CITES), but this move has been criticised by some authors as an ineffective strategy. Further research is also needed to determine if D. antongilii is in fact a separate species or merely a variant of D. guineti.
