= Healthcare in Madagascar =

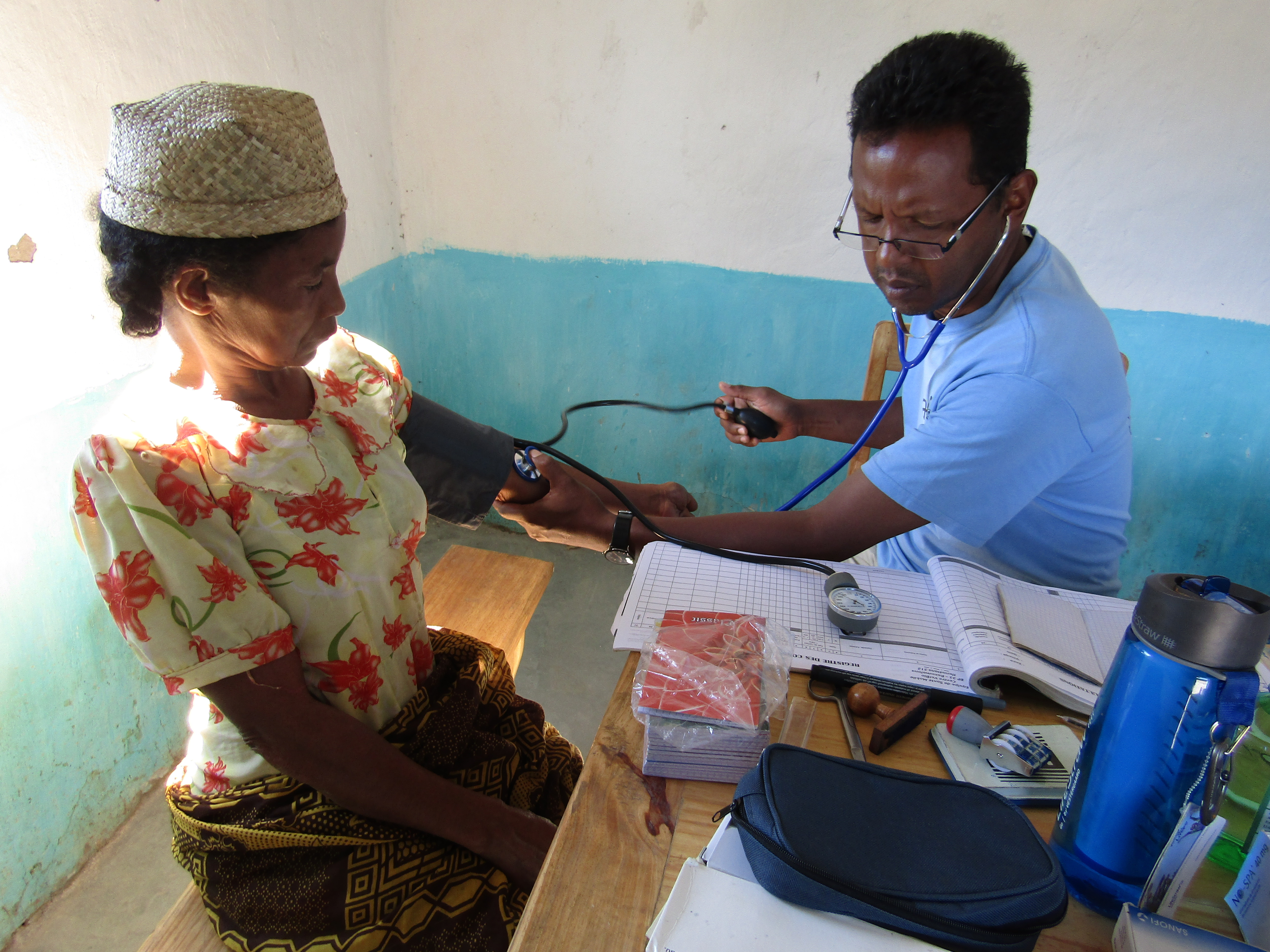
Free consultation with a doctor of mobile health team

In Madagascar, the healthcare system has seen slow progress. The Human Rights Measurement Initiative finds that Madagascar is fulfilling 90.8% of what it should be fulfilling for the right to health based on its level of income. When looking at the right to health with respect to children, Madagascar achieves 99.0% of what is expected based on its current income. In regards to the right to health amongst the adult population, the country achieves 96.8% of what is expected based on the nation's level of income. Madagascar falls into the "bad" category when evaluating the right to reproductive health because the nation is fulfilling only 76.6% of what the nation is expected to achieve based on the resources (income) it has available.

Hospitals and small medical centers and posts are found throughout the island of Madagascar, although they are concentrated in urban areas and particularly in Antananarivo. In addition to the high expense of medical care relative to the average Malagasy income, the prevalence of trained medical professionals remains extremely low.

== Access to health care ==
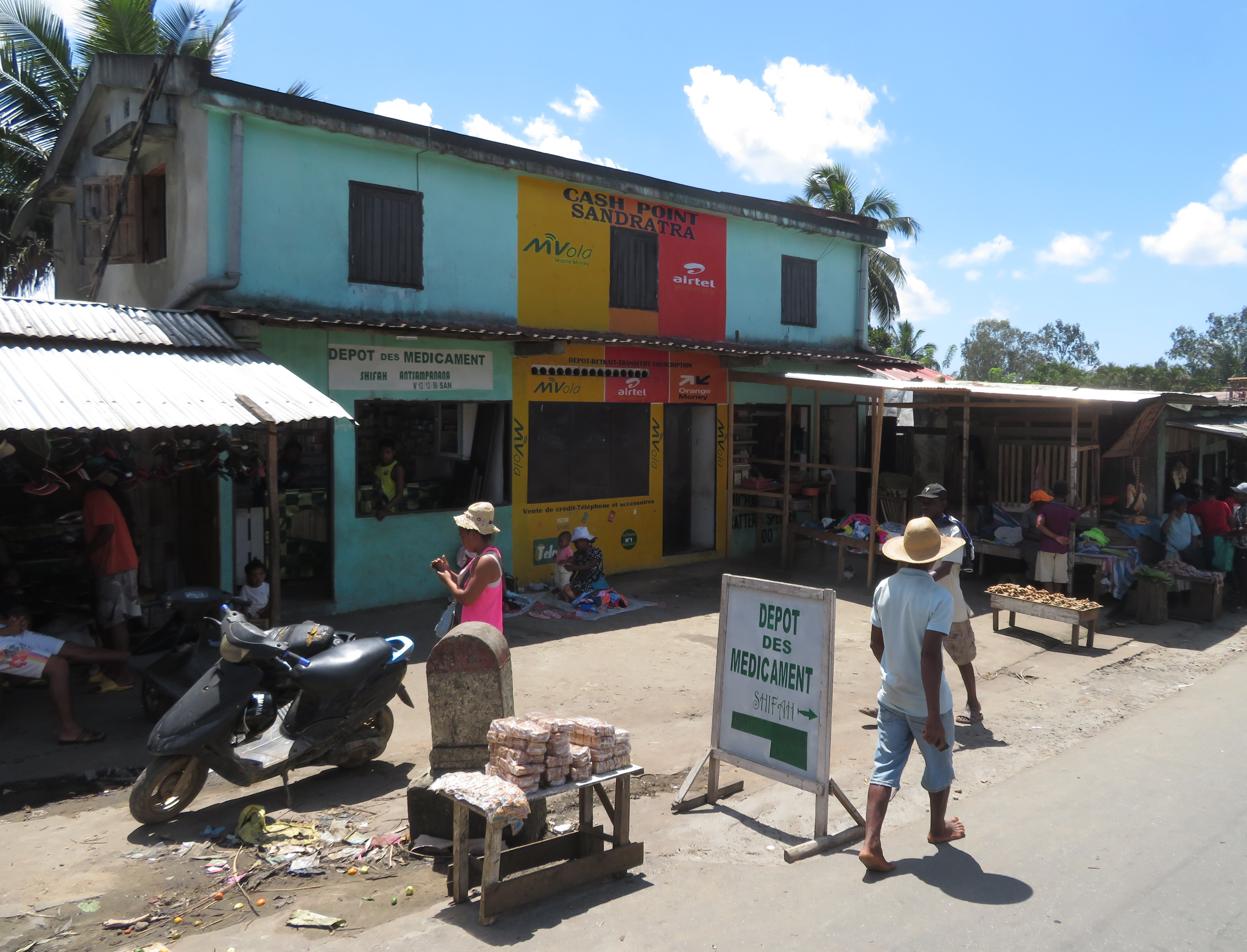
Medical store (Dépot de médicaments) in Antsampanana

Since most of the hospitals, health centers and health posts are located in urban areas, access to medical care remains beyond the reach of many. Around 35% of the population live more than 10 km (6.2 mi) from a health facility. Many people go to a medical store ("Dépot de médicaments"), which is not operated by a pharmacist or a doctor, where many medicaments are freely available. Primary health center utilization remains lower for more remote Malagasys.

In 2013, the healthcare structure in Madagascar consisted of different levels of care. 2,536 primary healthcare facilities existed, consisting of 947 Centres de Sante de Base Level 1, which are equivalent to health posts, and 1616 CSB Level 2, which are comparable to health centers. CSBs in Madagascar provide the lowest level of care. In 2013, Madagascar also had 86 district hospitals and 18 regional referral hospitals that provided diagnostics and surgical obstetric services. Madagascar also has twelve university teaching hospitals. These hospitals provide higher levels of care than CSBs.

== Health situation ==
Health services have shown a trend toward improvement over the past twenty years. There has been improved access to drinking water, intense malaria pre-elimination efforts and they have started campaigns to improve children's health. Child immunizations against such diseases as hepatitis B, diphtheria and measles increased an average of 60% in this period, indicating low but increasing availability of basic medical services and treatments. Schistosomiasis, malaria and sexually transmitted diseases are common in Madagascar, although infection rates of AIDS remain low relative to many countries in mainland Africa, at only 0.2% of the adult population. The malaria mortality rate is also among the lowest in Africa at 8.5 deaths per 100,000 people, in part due to the highest frequency use of insecticide treated nets in Africa. Adult life expectancy in 2009 was 63 years for men and 67 years for women.

== Maternal Health and trends in under-5 and infant mortality ==
Maternal Health

In 2020, the maternal mortality ratio in Madagascar was 392 deaths per 100,000 live births. The mortality rate in Madagascar has steadily decreased over the past 20 years. In 2000 the rate was 658 deaths per 100,000 live births, in 2005 the rate was 568 deaths per 100,000, in 2010 the rate was 484 deaths per 100,000 and in 2015 there were 482 deaths per 100,000. The current trend is a steady decline. The percentage of adolescent pregnancy has decreased in Madagascar. In 2022, 132 of 1000 girls ages 15-19 gave birth in Madagascar. In 2000, 2005, 2010, and 2015, the rates were 147.7, 143.5, 143, and 135.6 per 1000 girls aged 15-19. Madagascar is above the sub-saharan, low-income, and world averages of adolescent pregnancy, however, they have seen a steady decrease in these numbers. The stillbirth rate has consistently been about 18 deaths per 1000 total births. In 2022, the stillbirth rate was 18.36 per 1000 live births. The total number of stillbirths in Madagascar in 2021 was 16,743. Female genital mutilation is not practiced in Madagascar.

Overall, Maternal rates in Madagascar are seeing improvements, however, the availability of specific medical supplies needed in maternal, newborn, and child health has remained low. Improvements with public health facilities and the resources they need are currently being made.

Levels and trends in under-5 and infant mortality

In 2022, the under-five mortality rate in Madagascar was 65.76 per 1000 live births. The under-5 mortality rate has steadily decreased over the past 20 years. In 2000, 2005, 2010, and 2015, the rates were 104.9, 84.3, 70.6, and 65.8 per 1000 live births. The neonatal mortality rate (per 1000 live births has also been on a steady decline. In 2022, the neonatal mortality rate was 24. In 2000, the neonatal mortality rate was 31.1 deaths per 1000 live births, and it consistently has been decreasing. Although it is higher than the world average, it is lower than the African average (24 deaths per 1000 live births). In 2022, the number of infant deaths was 40,388. The trend between 1994 and 2014 was a steady decline, however, Madagascar is now seeing a steady increase in the number of infant deaths.

== Malnutrition ==
Madagascar has a malnutrition burden among its under-5 population. Numbers between June 2023 and April 2024 show that malnutrition among the group will increase. About 458,700 children under-5 will be likely to face acute malnutrition. Among the 458,700 children, 121,000 of them will experience Severe Acute malnutrition. 338,000 of the under-5 population will experience Moderate Acute Malnutrition.

The adult population in Madagascar also face a malnutrition burden. 37.8% of Malagasy women of reproductive age have anaemia, and around 7.4% of adult Malagasy men have diabetes while 5.4% of women have diabetes.

In rural areas of Madagascar, malnutrition poses a larger issue. A third of rural populations in Madagascar face food insecurity, mainly due to limited finances. However, organizations in Madagascar are currently trying to combat the number, including Scaling up Nutrition.

== Measles ==
In 2018 a measles epidemic struck the island, with more than 117,000 people infected. Only 58% of people on the main island were vaccinated against measles. More than 1,200 people died, most of them children. Malnutrition, which is widespread, increased the rate of fatalities.

== See also ==
- Malaria in Madagascar
- List of hospitals in Madagascar
