= Solages =

Solages is a French surname. It may refer to:

- Gabriel de Solages (1711–99), French soldier and industrialist
- Henri de Solages (1786–1832), French Catholic missionary
- Michaelle C. Solages (b. 1985), New York State representative
- Solage (or Soulage) (fl. late 14th century), French composer
