= Fetraomby =

- Location in Madagascar
- Coordinates: 18°35′00″S 48°55′00″E
- Country: Madagascar
- Region: Atsinanana
- District: Vohibinany (district)

Area
  - Total: 320 km^{2} (120 sq mi)

Population (Census)2019
  - Total: 16,894
  - Ethnicities: Betsimisaraka
- Time zone: UTC3 (EAT)
- Postal code: 508

Fetraomby is a village and rural commune in the Brickaville district (or: Vohibinany (district)) in Atsinanana, Madagascar.

The village can be accessed by following the Rianila River by canoe.

== Economy ==
The economy is based on agriculture. Rice and coffee are grown in Fetraomby. The Sahamamy graphite mine has operated there since 2019.

== Population ==
- Betsimisaraka
