= Vohibinany District =

Brickaville Ampasimanolotra/Vohibinany
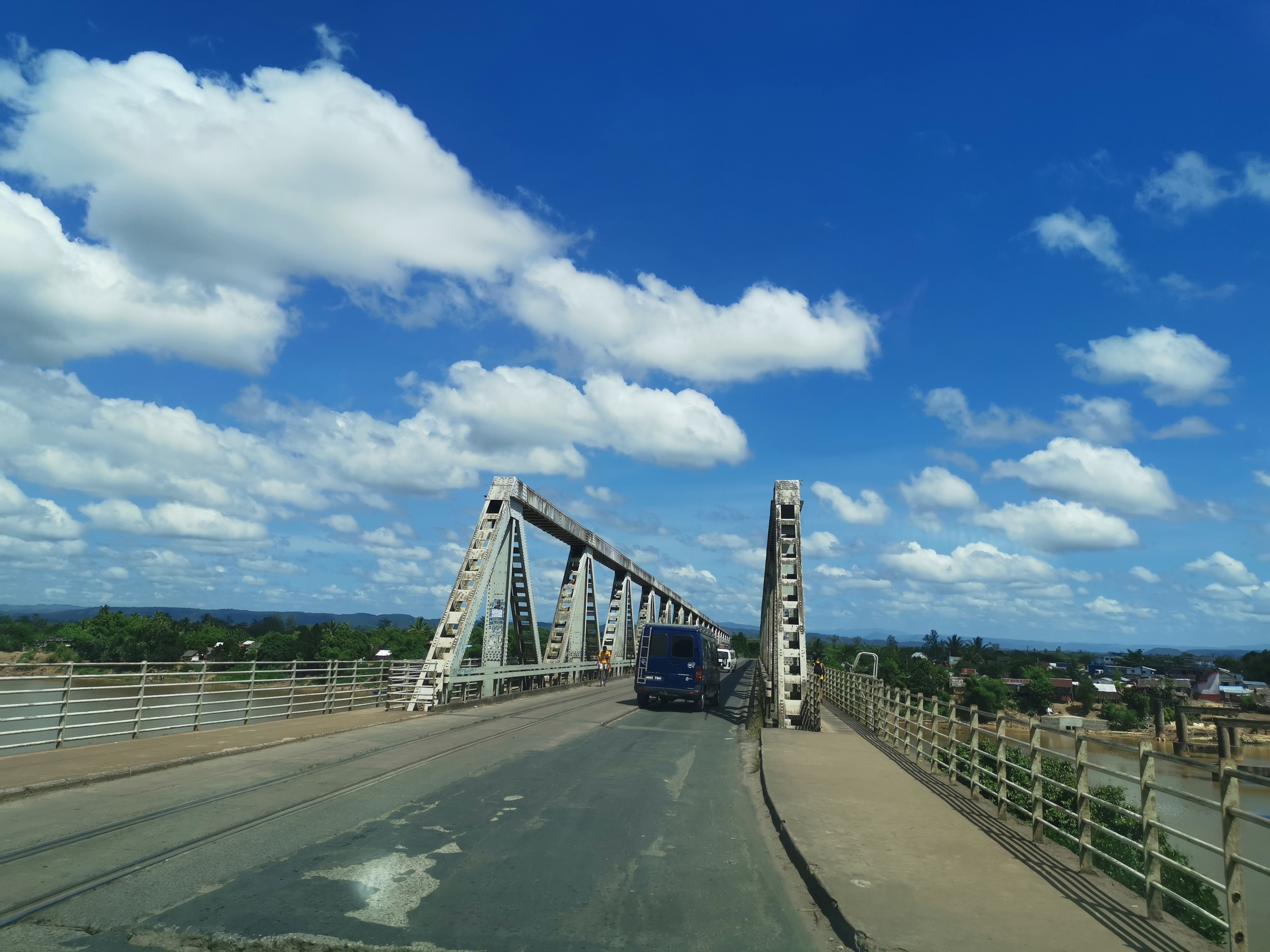
- Brickaville

- Location in Madagascar
- Coordinates: 18°49′10″S 49°04′25″E
- Country: Madagascar
- Region: Tamatave
- District: Vohibinany (district)

Area
  - Total: 5,385 km^{2} (2,079 sq mi)

Population (2020)
  - Total: 218,727
  - Density: 40.62/km^{2} (105.2/sq mi)
- Time zone: UTC3 (EAT)

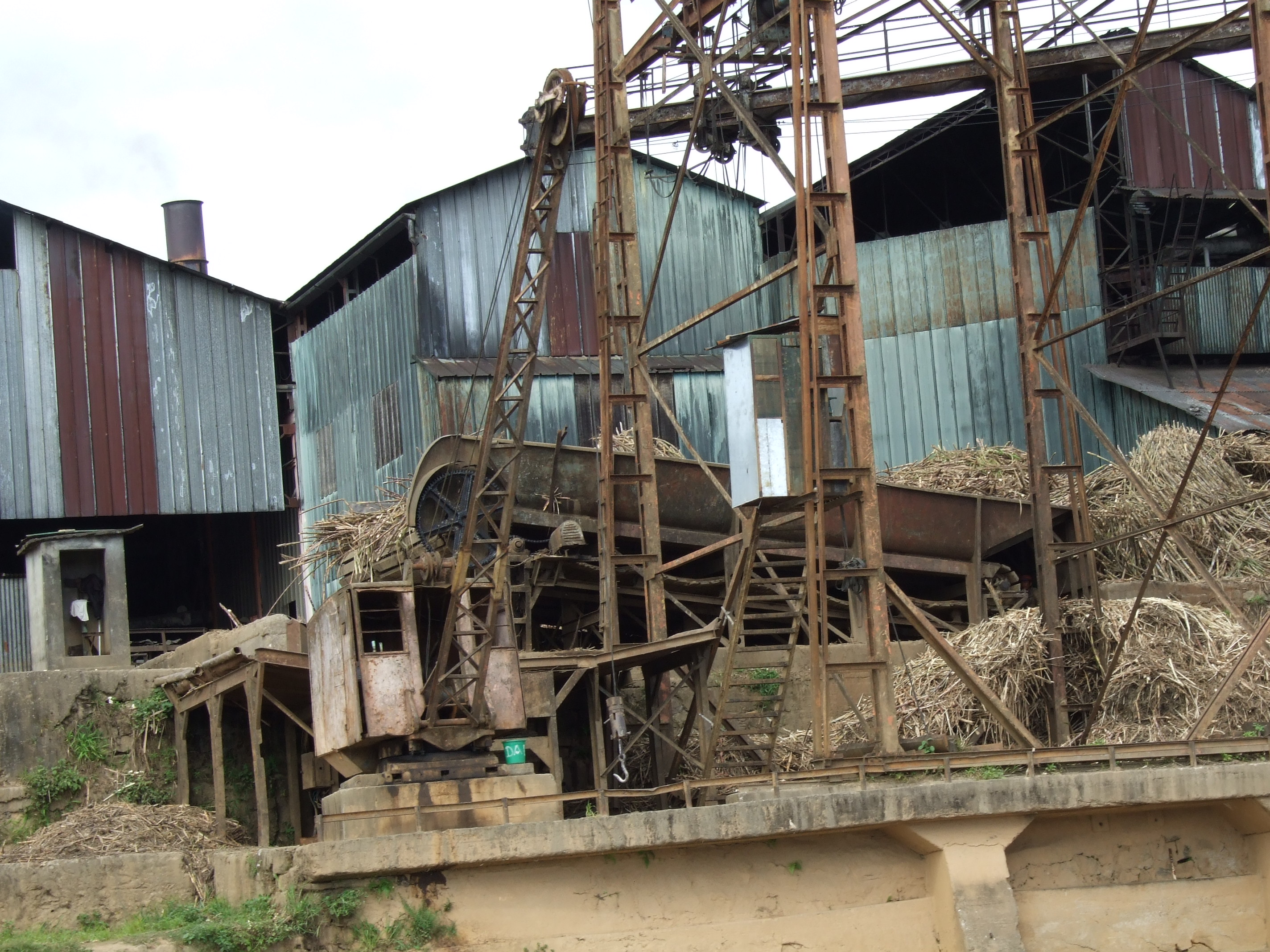
Sugarcane factory in Brickaville in 2007

Brickaville District is an administrative district in Atsinanana Region, Madagascar; also known as Ampasimanolotra and Vohibinany. Brickaville is located along Route nationale 2 (RN 2), 105 km south of Toamasina (the primary seaport of the country) and 220 km east of Antananarivo (the capital). It is also situated alongside the Rianila river. It is a railway station on the Antananarivo - East Coast line. Its main industries revolve around sugar. The district has an estimated population in 2020 was 218,727.

== Communes ==
The district is further divided into 17 communes; which are further sub-divided into 180 villages (fokontany):

- Ambalarondra
- Ambinaninony
- Ambohimanana
- Ampasimbe
- Andekaleka
- Andevoranto
- Anivorano Est
- Anjahamana
- Brickaville (Vohibinany)
- Fanasana
- Fetraomby
- Lohariandava
- Mahatsara
- Maroseranana
- Ranomafana Est
- Razanaka
- Vohitranivona

== Economy ==
The economy is based on agriculture. Lychee, Rice, coconuts and coffee are grown. Since 2019 there is also a graphite mine in Fetraomby, the Sahamamy graphite mine.

== Roads ==
There are two mayor roads: the National Road 2 that leads from the capitol Antananarivo to Toamasina and the National Road 11a that leads from its junction with the national road 2 at Antsampanana south to Vatomandry.
