= Mahatsara =

Mahatsara Mahatsara Est
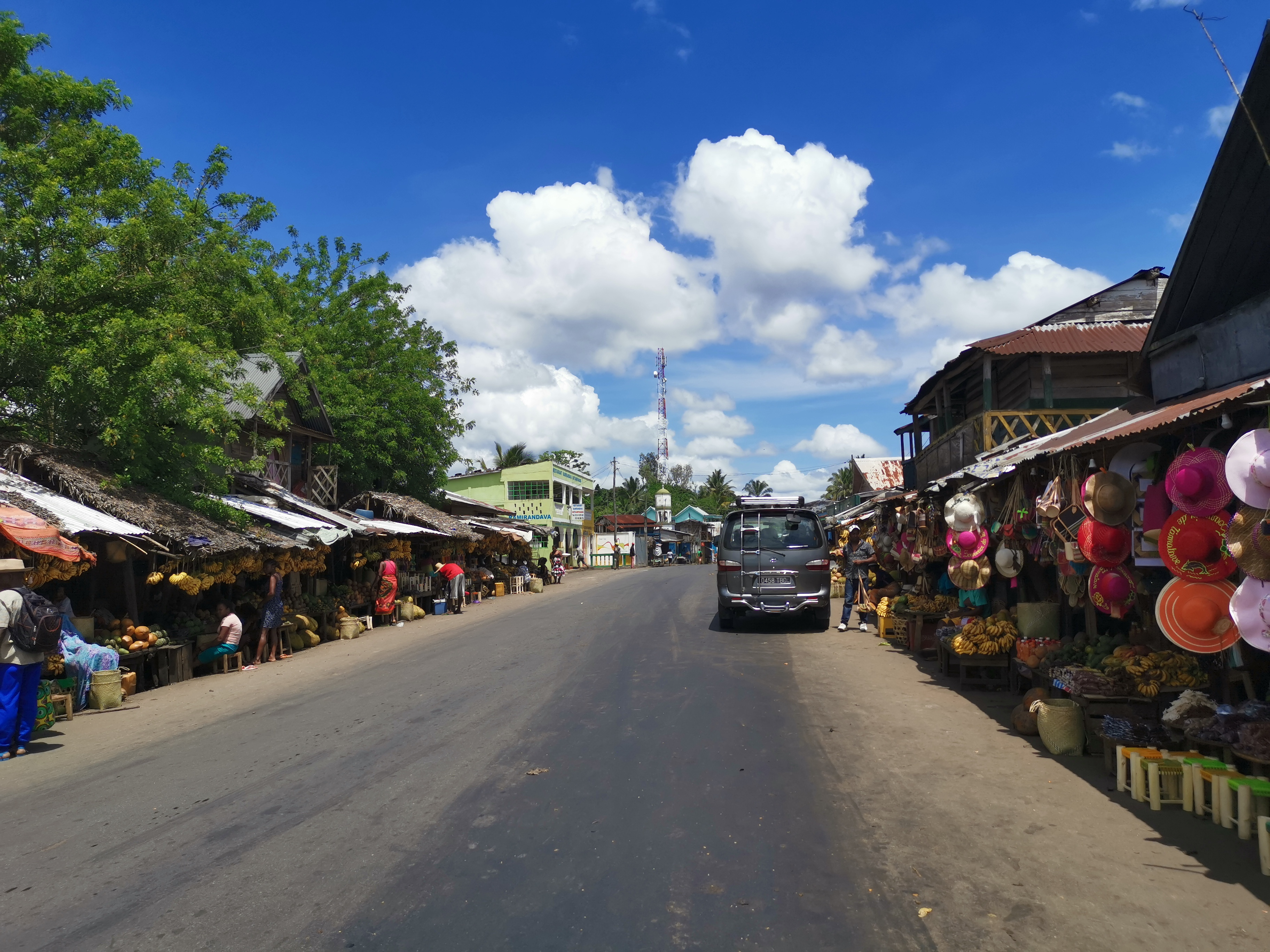
- RN at Antsampana

- Location in Madagascar
- Coordinates: 18°57′00″S 49°01′00″E
- Country: Madagascar
- Region: Atsinanana
- District: Vohibinany (district)

Area
  - Total: 525 km^{2} (203 sq mi)
- Elevation: 10 m (33 ft)

Population (2015)
  - Total: 2,500
- Time zone: UTC3 (EAT)
- Postal code: 508

18°16′S 49°20′E

Mahatsara or Mahatsara Est is a village and commune in the district of Brickaville Vohibinany (district), Atsinanana Region, Madagascar. The RN 2 it crosses the territory of the commune in Antsampanana.

It is located near the coast and near the mouth of the Laroka river, shortly before it flows into the Rianila river.

The following Fokontany (villages) also belong to the commune of Mahatsara:

- Anatsara
- Antsampanana
- Mahavory
- Menatsara
