= Lohariandava =

- Location in Madagascar
- Coordinates: 18°47′00″S 48°40′30″E
- Country: Madagascar
- Region: Atsinanana
- District: Vohibinany (district)
- Elevation: 75 m (246 ft)

Population (2018)Census
  - Total: 10,670
  - Ethnicities: Betsimisaraka
- Time zone: UTC3 (EAT)
- Postal code: 508

Lohariandava is a village and commune in the Brickaville district (or: Vohibinany (district)) in the Atsinanana Region, Madagascar.

It is located near on the banks of the Vohitra river. This town can be accessed only by train.
