= Razanaka =

Razanaka Vohipeno Razanaka
- Location in Madagascar
- Coordinates: 18°46′10″S 48°52′54″E
- Country: Madagascar
- Region: Atsinanana
- District: Vohibinany (district)
- Elevation: 24 m (79 ft)

Population (2018 Census)
  - Total: 5,592
- Time zone: UTC3 (EAT)
- Postal code: 508

Razanaka or Vohipeno Razanaka is a rural municipality in the Brickaville district (or Vohibinany) in the Atsinanana Region, Madagascar.

It is located near on the banks of the Vohitra river.

== Agriculture ==
Curcuma is widely planted in this municipality.
