= Moraingy =

Fighting style of Madagascar

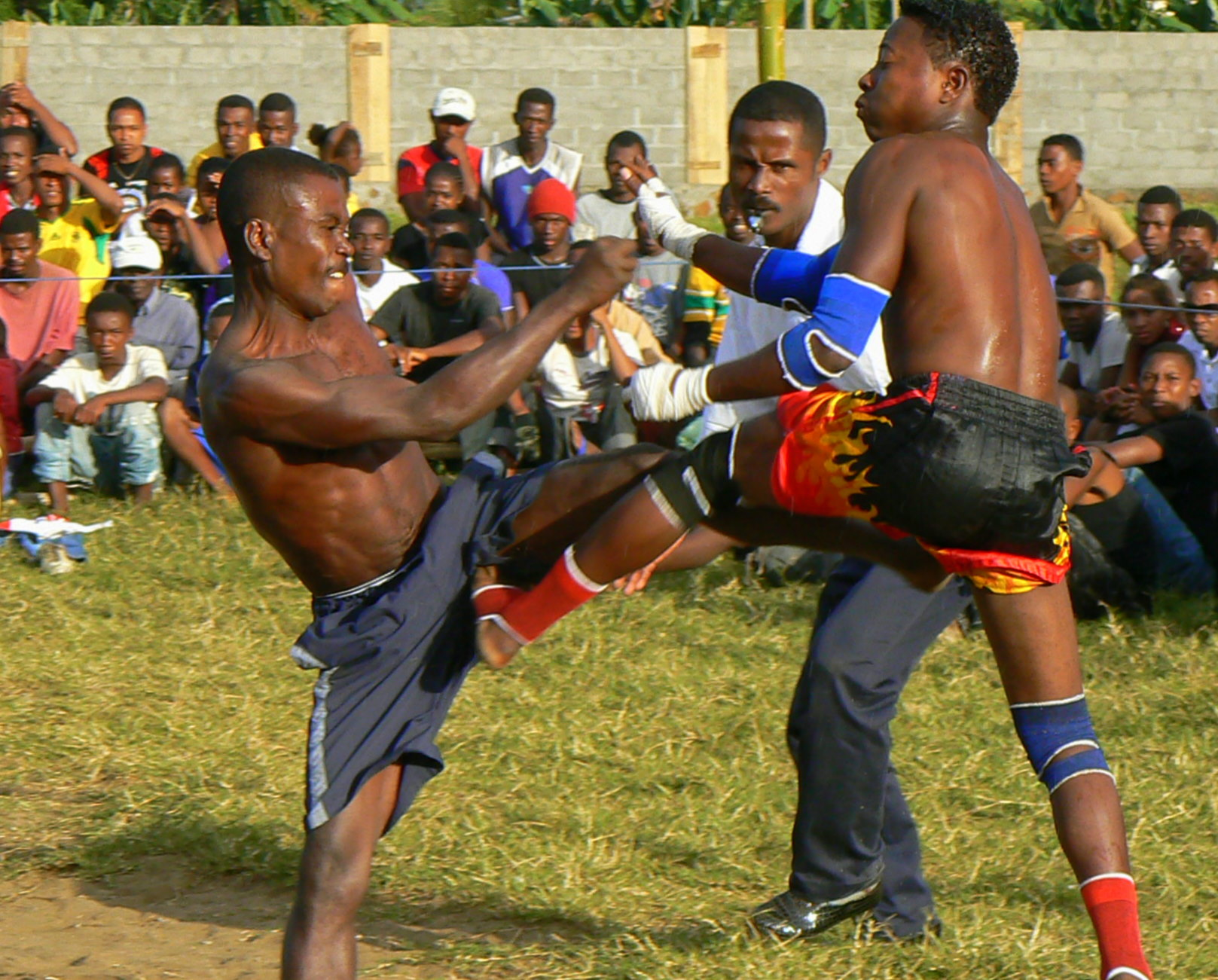
Moraingy is a traditional martial art of Madagascar.

Moraingy is an unarmed, bare-fisted striking style of traditional martial art from Madagascar. It is also known as Malagasy boxing.

Participation in this combat form was originally limited to young men, providing them opportunity to gain prestige and test their abilities, while allowing elders to judge their physical skills. Participants are called kidabolahy (young men) or kidabo mpanao moraingy (young people who practice moraingy) and are widely respected by fellow villagers. In the North, they are called Fagnorolahy, and the assistants, magnafo. Today, the sport is no longer restricted by gender.

The forms of this combat game is known as mrengé in Comoros, morengy in Madagascar, and moringue in Réunion. Mrengé, believed to be the oldest, is a furious fight using fists, kicks, grabbing and headbutts.

There is only one other known African combat game that uses similar kicking techniques to moraingy: engolo, which is played in Angola.

== History ==
Moraingy originated during the Maroseranana dynasty (ruled from 1675) of the Sakalava Kingdom of western coastal Madagascar. It was widely practiced in the 17th century, especially during the reign of King Andrianapoimerina. Moraingy was a ritual contest of virility between men, typically performed at celebrations and circumcision ceremonies. It has since become popularized throughout Madagascar, but particularly in coastal regions, and has spread to neighboring Indian Ocean islands including Réunion, Mayotte, Comoros, Seychelles and Mauritius.

The fact that the martial art is associated with slaves in Comoros, Réunion, and Madagascar (where they are practiced by ethnic groups from Mozambique) suggests that they originated as a result of the slave trade.

=== Spread to Réunion ===
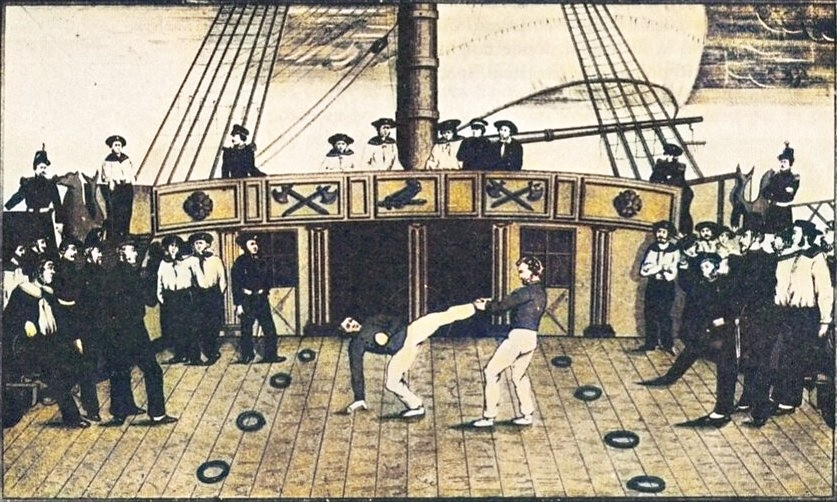
Illustration from 1847 of French sailors practicing Savate on a ship.

Although moraingy is primarily concentrated in the coastal regions of Madagascar where it was historically popularized, Malagasy migrants took the sport with them when traveling overseas. In Reunion Island, a French territory 500 kilometers east of Madagascar, where a large number of Malagasy people were brought by the French to work as slave laborers, the sport took root under the name moringue, or batay kreol. Originally limited to the slave's quarters of the sugar plantations, in the 19th century the moringue included other ethnic groups, such as Indians and the mixed population.

In 2005 it was recognized by the Reunion government as an official sport of the island. The popularization of the sport is in part due to a growing acknowledgement of the Malagasy and African origins of the island's Creole community. Moringue is now organized like other mainstream sports, with about 1000 licensees, and receives local media attention. The most celebrated Reunionais moringue athlete is Jean-Rene Dreinaza.

== Music ==
Moraingy matches must by tradition be accompanied by music (often salegy) to induce a trance-like state in the fighters and participants, contributing to the spiritual and communal experience of the fight. As part of this experience, participants typically engage in dances during and between the matches that are meant to provoke the supporters of the opposing party, while the crowd cheers and jeers loudly.

== Rules ==
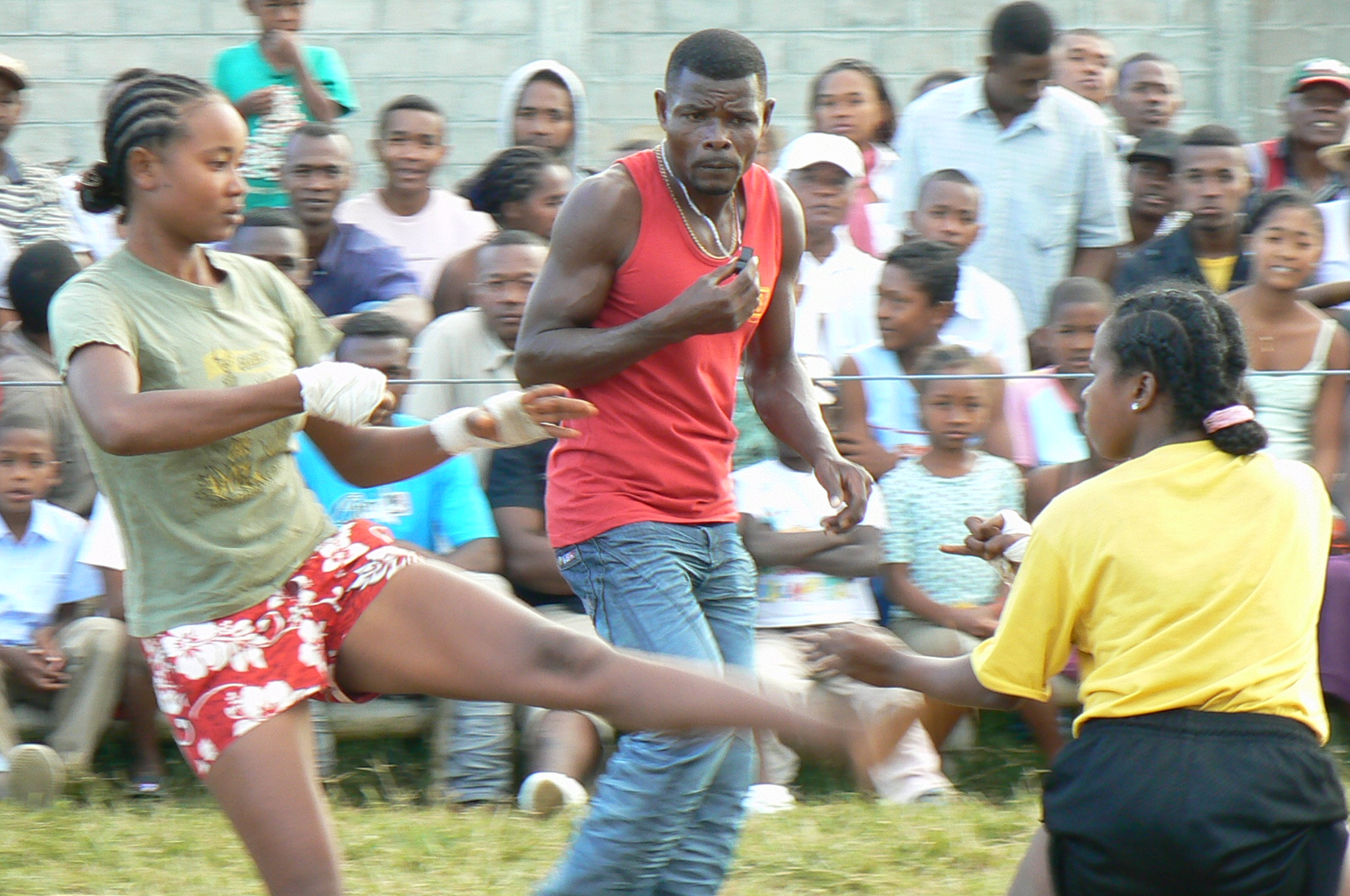
Moraingy, female fight

A typical moraingy competition consists of a series of matches pitting two fighters, typically from different villages, against one another. Prior to the fight, all the fighters parade around in the outdoor arena (typically a soccer field) to size up and select their potential adversaries, while the spectators who ring the field cheer, sing and attempt to provoke the fighters. The matches are announced and each clan sings its own chant in support of the fighter from its village. Each match lasts only one round and ends when one of the fighters exits the arena, faints, is no longer able to defend himself, is clearly unequal to the other, or is determined to be seriously injured. The judges of the match declare a victor and no contesting of the determination is permitted; both participants are cheered by the spectators for their efforts in the match.

== Moraingy techniques ==
Moraingy is considered a half-distance or long-range fighting sport with punches predominating but with some kicks permitted. Types of punches include straight punches (mitso), hooks (mandraoky), downward slanting punches (vangofary) and a punch similar to an uppercut (vangomioriky). Defenses include guarding and sidesteps, but neither the attacks nor defenses are standardized, creating higher variability among individual fighters and between regions than in international boxing.

== Moringue (Reunionais) techniques ==
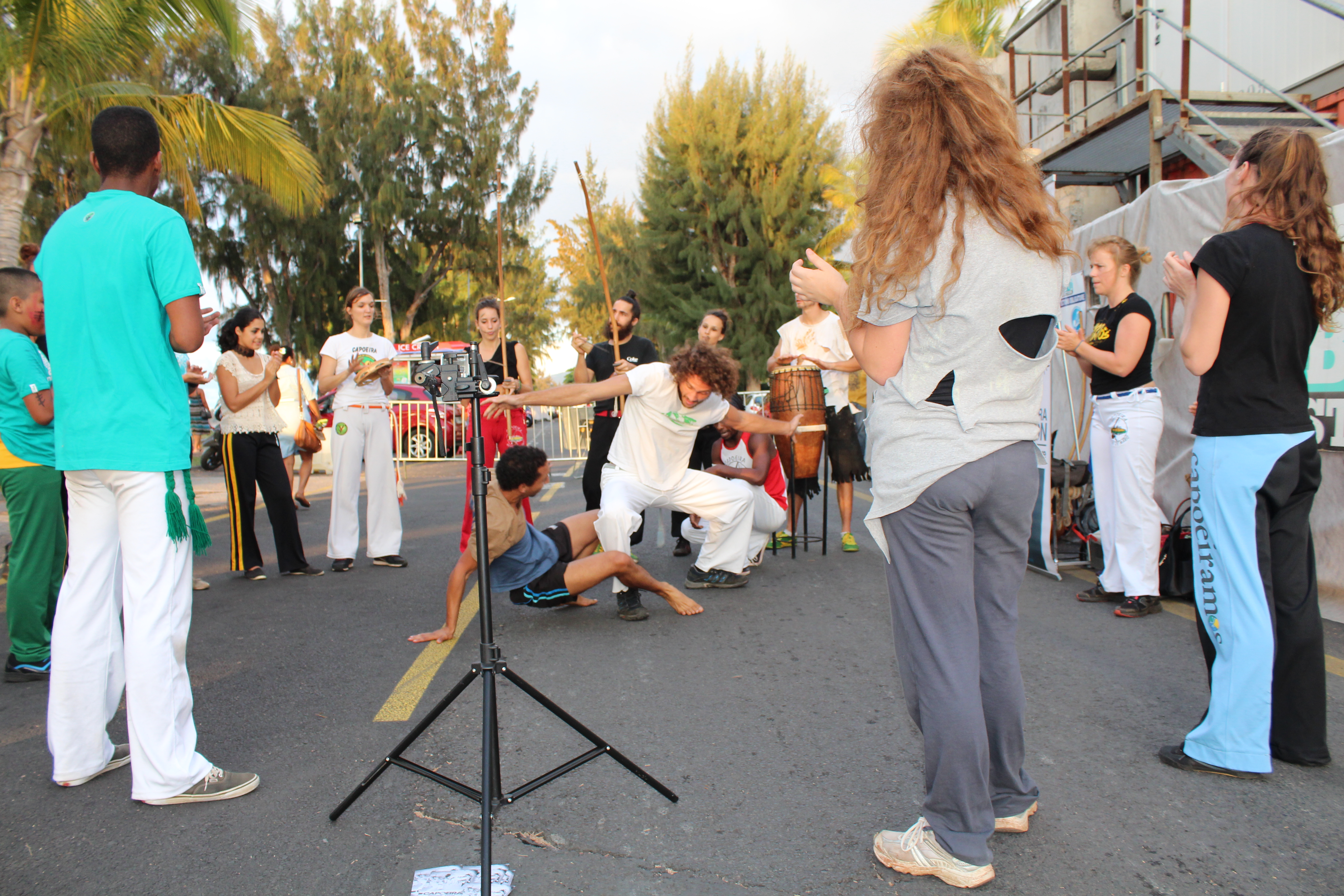
Demonstration of Moringue in Réunion.

Unlike its counterparts in Comoros and Madagascar, moringue exclusively relies on kicks and does not incorporate punches into its techniques.

The Reunionais form of moraingy is less violent and more resembled the choreography and acrobatics of Brazilian capoeira than the original Malagasy form (which resembled that of Polynesian Kapu Kuialua). For example, the heel strike called talon zirondelles in moringue is equivalent to the technique known as rabo de arraia in capoeira.

The use of jumps and stomping makes it spectacular. As in Madagascar, music is played throughout moringue matches, typically consisting of percussion or Reunionais maloya music.

== Influence on other martial arts ==
According to historians, French martial art savate was brought by the sailors on their trips to the countries of the Indian Ocean and the China Sea. Some authors believe that French savate then influenced Brazilian capoeira, through sailors who often sailed between Africa, France and Brazil.

== See also ==
- Kapu Kuialua, a Hawaiian martial art that the Malagasy form was inspired from
- Limalama
- Capoeira
- Bare-knuckle boxing
- Karate

== Literature ==
- Assunção, Matthias Röhrig (2002). Capoeira: The History of an Afro-Brazilian Martial Art. Routledge. ISBN 978-0-7146-8086-6.
- Ratsimbazafy, Ernest (2010). "Moraingy". In Green, Thomas; Svinth, Joseph (eds.). Martial Arts of the World: An Encyclopedia of History and Innovation, Volume 2. Santa Barbara, CA: ABC CLIO. ISBN 978-1-59884-243-2.
