= Andekaleka =

Andekaleka Gare Andekaleka
- Location in Madagascar
- Coordinates: 18°48′S 48°36′E
- Country: Madagascar
- Region: Atsinanana
- District: Vohibinany (district)

Area
  - Total: 118 km^{2} (46 sq mi)
- Elevation: 600 m (2,000 ft)

Population (2018)Census
  - Total: 5,457
- Time zone: UTC3 (EAT)

Andekaleka (also Gare Andekaleka) is a town and commune (Malagasy: kaominina) in Madagascar. It belongs to the district of Vohibinany (district), which is a part of Atsinanana Region.

== Geography ==
The town lies has a railway station on the East Coast line from Antananarivo – Toamasina.

== Economy ==
- the Andekaleka Dam, a hydraulic power station on the Vohitra river.

== Rivers ==
The town is crossed by the Vohitra river.

== See also ==
- Railway stations in Madagascar
