= Andekaleka Dam =

Dam in Andekaleka, Madagascar

- Location within Madagascar
- Country: Madagascar
- Location: Andekaleka, Analamanga Region
- Coordinates: 18°47′39.02″S 48°37′09.49″E
- Purpose: Power
- Status: Operational
- Construction began: 1978
- Opening date: 1982
- Construction cost: US$142.1 million
- Owner: Jirama

Dam and spillways
- Type of dam: Gravity
- Impounds: Vohitra River
- Height: 10 m (33 ft)
- Length: 125 m (410 ft)

Andekaleka Hydroelectric Power Station
- Coordinates: 18°48′12.20″S 48°39′20.03″E
- Commission date: 1982, 2012
- Hydraulic head: 235 m (771 ft)
- Turbines: 2 x 29 MW (39,000 hp), 1 x 33 MW (44,000 hp) Francis-type
- Installed capacity: 91 MW (122,000 hp)

The Andekaleka Dam is a gravity dam on the Vohitra river near Andekaleka in eastern Madagascar. The primary purpose of the dam is hydroelectric power generation and it diverts water from the Vohitra east into a 4 kilometres (2.5 mi) headrace tunnel where it reaches a 91 megawatts (122,000 hp) underground power station. After water charges the turbine-generators, it travels down a 500 metres (1,600 ft) tailrace tunnel before it reenters the Vohitra River. The drop in elevation between the dam and power station affords a hydraulic head of 235 metres (771 ft). The dam and power station were funded by the World Bank at a cost of US$142.1 million. It was constructed between 1978 and 1982. The power station can house up to four generators. The first two were operational in 1982 and a third in 2012. Generator one and two host Vevey and Jeumont turbines while the third is made by HEC. They all use Francis reaction turbines which typically range from 10 to 700MW and with water head operating from 10 to 600 meters.

== Fire ==
On 2 January 2022 a fire broke out in its power plant. This caused many black-outs in Antananarivo and its surroundings. The power units will be again functional around mid-June 2022.

== Video ==
- Zahatany 25 Mai 2024 |Aire Protégée et le barrage d'Andekaleka |Grotte d'Ambatolatabatra, Manasamena
