= Anjahamana =

- Location in Madagascar
- Coordinates: 18°22′00″S 48°58′00″E
- Country: Madagascar
- Region: Atsinanana
- District: Vohibinany (district)
- Elevation: 700 m (2,300 ft)

Population (2019)Census
  - Total: 9,846
- Time zone: UTC3 (EAT)

Anjahamana is a village and rural municipality in the district of Brickaville Vohibinany (district), Atsinanana Region, Madagascar.
