= Ambohimanana =

- Location in Madagascar
- Coordinates: 19°32′00″S 48°59′00″E
- Country: Madagascar
- Region: Atsinanana
- District: Vohibinany (district)
- Elevation: 414 m (1,358 ft)

Population (2019)Census
  - Total: 4,616
- Time zone: UTC3 (EAT)

Ambohimanana is a village and rural commune in the Brickaville district (or: Vohibinany (district)) in the Atsinanana Region, Madagascar.
