= Ambinaninony =

- Location in Madagascar
- Coordinates: 18°36′00″S 49°07′00″E
- Country: Madagascar
- Region: Atsinanana
- District: Vohibinany (district)

Government
  - Mayor: Cécilien Ranaivo
- Elevation: 78 m (256 ft)

Population (2019)Census
  - Total: 12,392
- Time zone: UTC3 (EAT)
- Postal code: 508

Ambinaninony is a village and rural commune in the Brickaville district (or: Vohibinany (district)) in the Atsinanana Region, Madagascar.

It is located near on the banks of the Rongaronga river and on the National Road 2 (RN2).
