= Ranomafana Est =

Village in Madagascar

- Location in Madagascar
- Coordinates: 18°57′30″S 48°50′30″E
- Country: Madagascar
- Region: Atsinanana
- District: Vohibinany (district)
- Elevation: 45 m (148 ft)

Population (2018)Census
  - Total: 14,672
- Time zone: UTC3 (EAT)

Ranomafana Est is a village and commune in the district of Brickaville Vohibinany (district), Atsinanana Region, Madagascar. The RN 2 passes through the town.
