= Ampasimbe =

- Location in Madagascar
- Coordinates: 16°49′00″S 49°00′00″E
- Country: Madagascar
- Region: Atsinanana
- District: Vohibinany (district)
- Elevation: 946 m (3,104 ft)

Population (2019)Census
  - Total: 12,122
- Time zone: UTC3 (EAT)

Ampasimbe is a village and rural commune in the Brickaville district (or Vohibinany (district)) in the Atsinanana Region, Madagascar.
