= Andevoranto =

Andevoranto Andovoranto
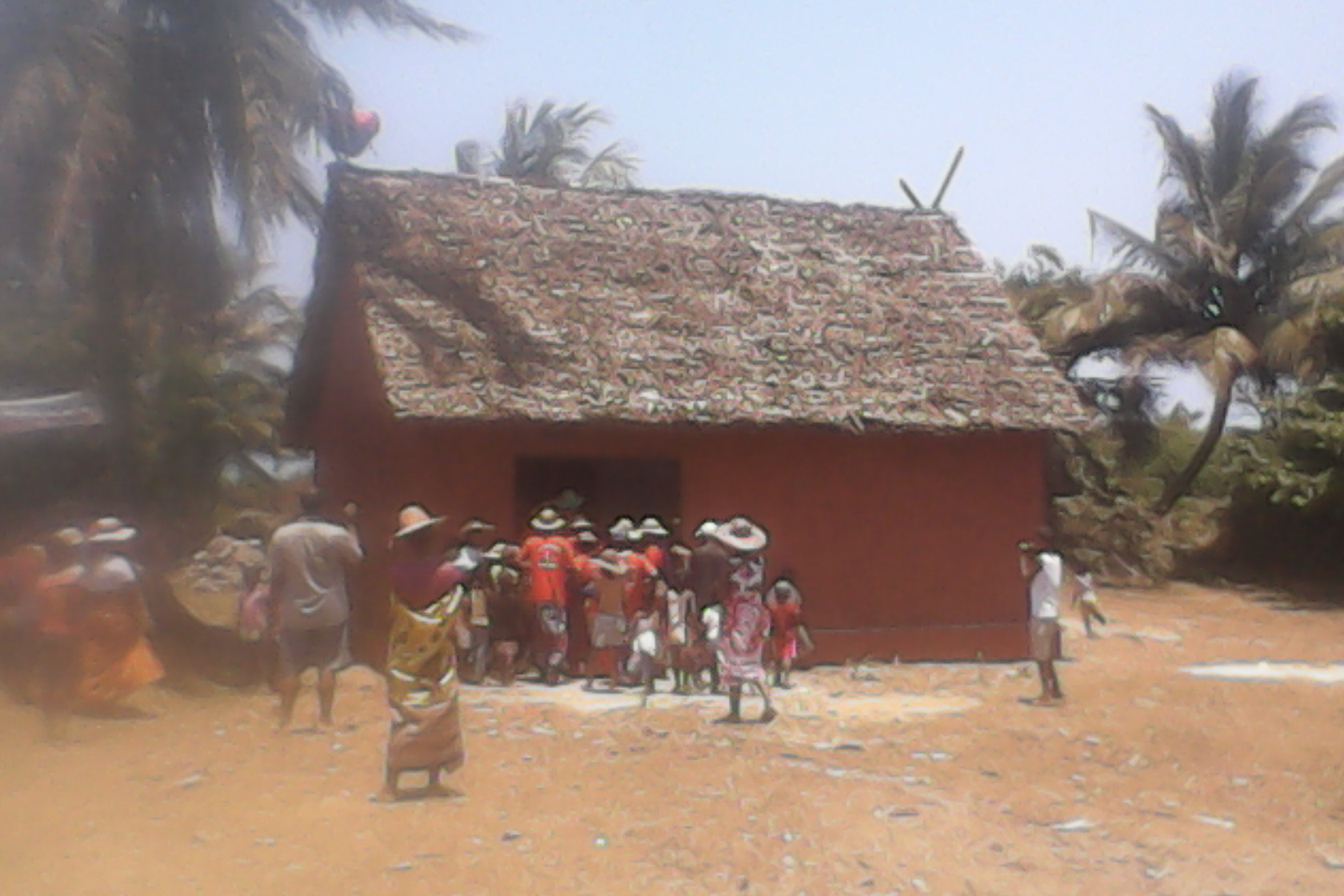
- Andevoranto

- Location in Madagascar
- Coordinates: 18°57′16″S 49°6′34″E
- Country: Madagascar
- Region: Atsinanana
- District: Vohibinany (district)

Government
  - Mayor: Maxime Laro

Area
  - Total: 325 km^{2} (125 sq mi)

Population (2018)Census
  - Total: 10,723
- Time zone: UTC3 (EAT)
- Postal code: 508

Andevoranto [andevʷˈrantʷ] is a rural municipality in the Brickaville District, Atsinanana Region, Madagascar.

It is located near the coast and near the mouth of the Rianila River at a distance of 20 km from Brickaville.

During the French colonial rule of the island, Andrevoranto was the capital of Andevoranto Province, and sources also described it as a former capital of the Betsimisaraka people in the region. The town was at that point also the junction of a number of important roads, including the key road from the coast to the capital, Antananarivo. Today, the key route of Route nationale 2 from the capital is located west of Andevoranto.

== Railroad ==
There is a train station at Ambila-Lemaitso (Train DIA SOA) on the line from Toamasina-Antananarivo.

== Geography ==
It is situated 20 km South of Brickaville and 100 km from Toamasina.

== Bodies of Waters ==
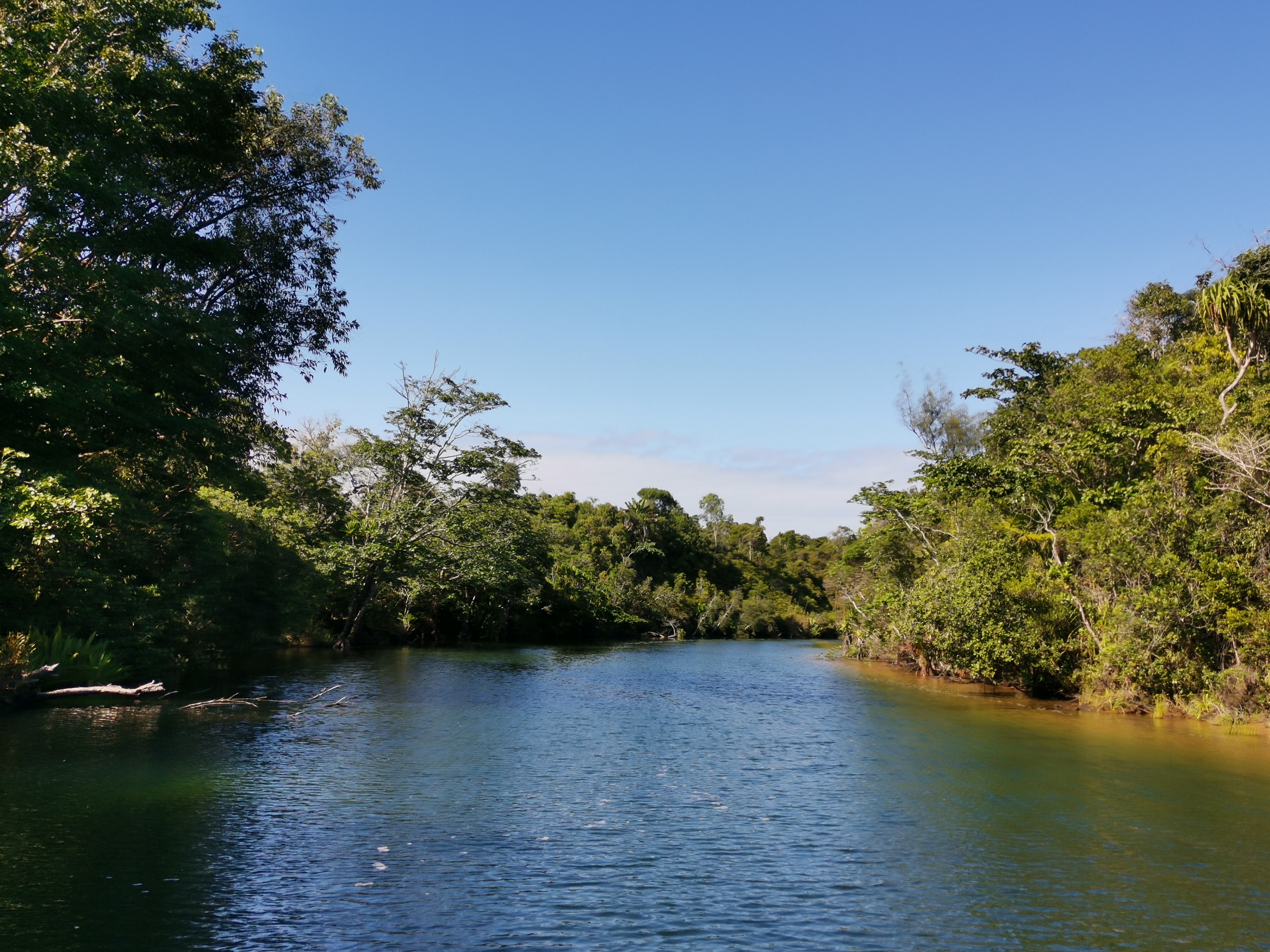
the Canal des Pangalanes

The Canal des Pangalanes follows the coastline a few hundred meters distance from North to South. This is a channel that connects the lakes of the region, as the Anjamborona Lake that is the largest in the municipality.

== Fokontany ==
12 Fokontany (villages) are part of this municipality: Andovoranto, Ambatobe, Ianakonitra, Andavakimena, Sondrara, Manakambahiny, Ambodivoara, Vohitrampasina, Vavony, Ambila Lemaitso, Manaratsandry and Manerinerina.

== Nature ==
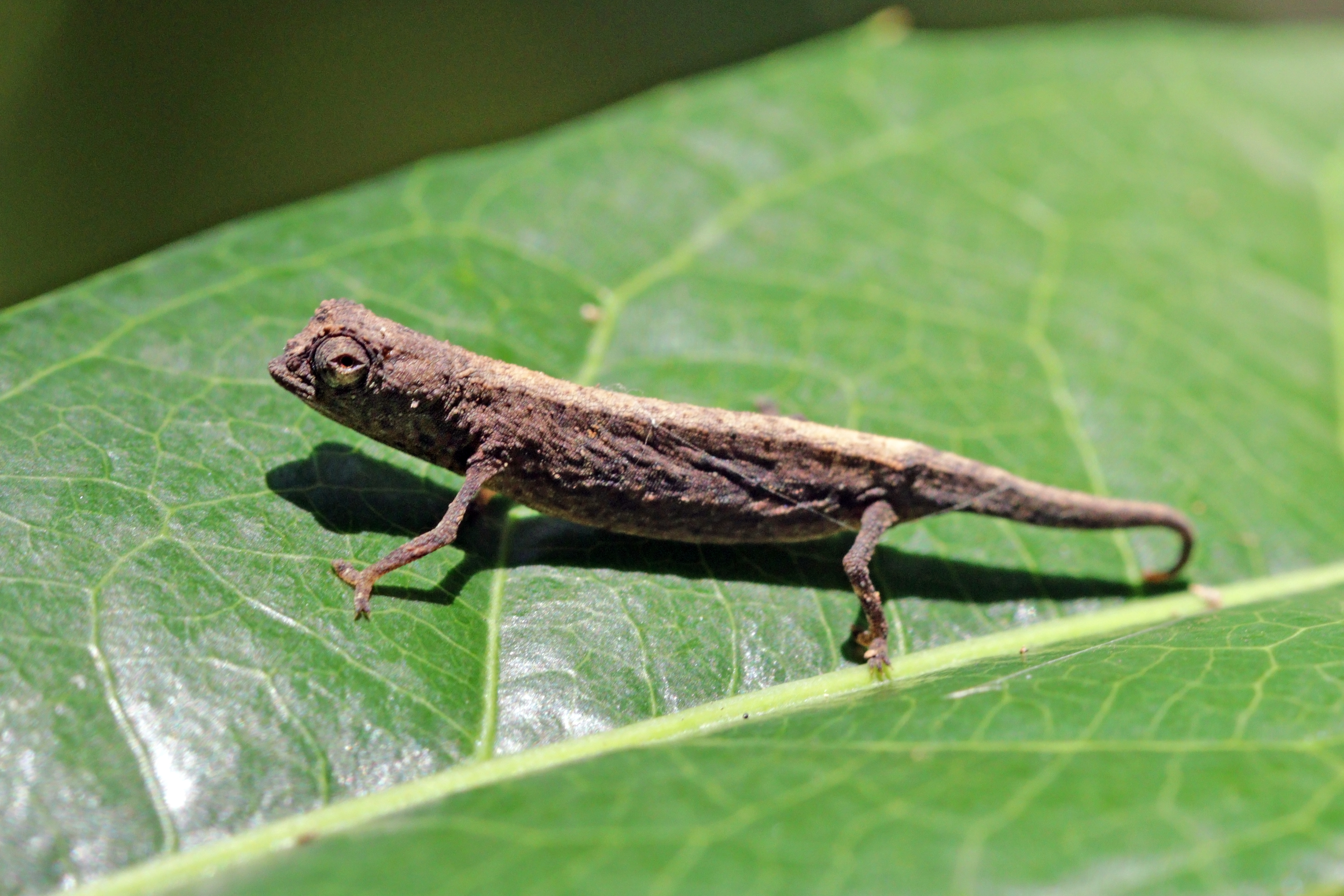
Minute leaf chameleon (Brookesia minima)

- The Vohibola Reserve that also is found the smallest frog on earth, Stumpffia pygmaea and Stumpffia vohibolensis but also the smallest cameleon Brookesia minima of this planet and Calumma vohibola, another species of cameleons.

== Personalities ==
- Henri de Solages
