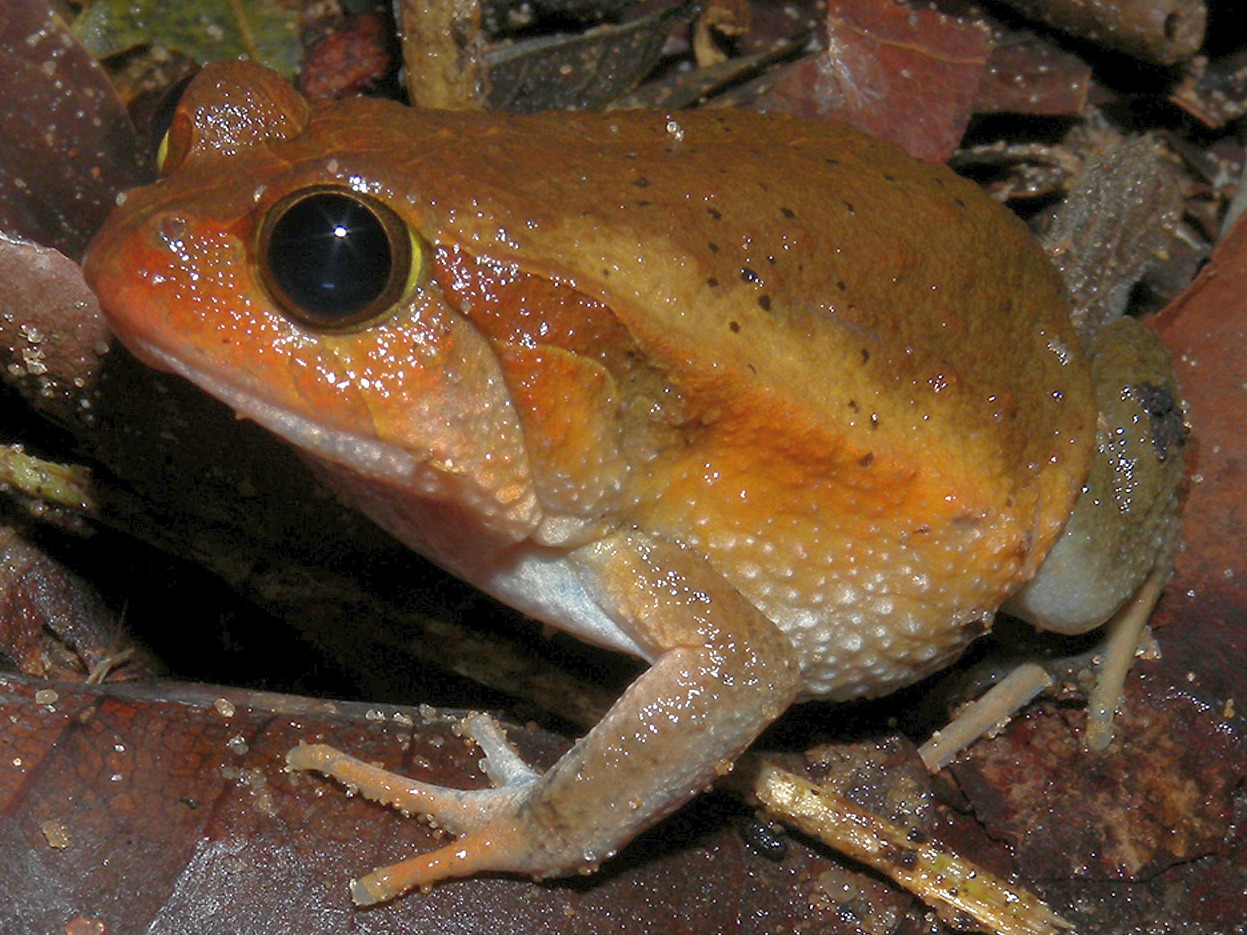

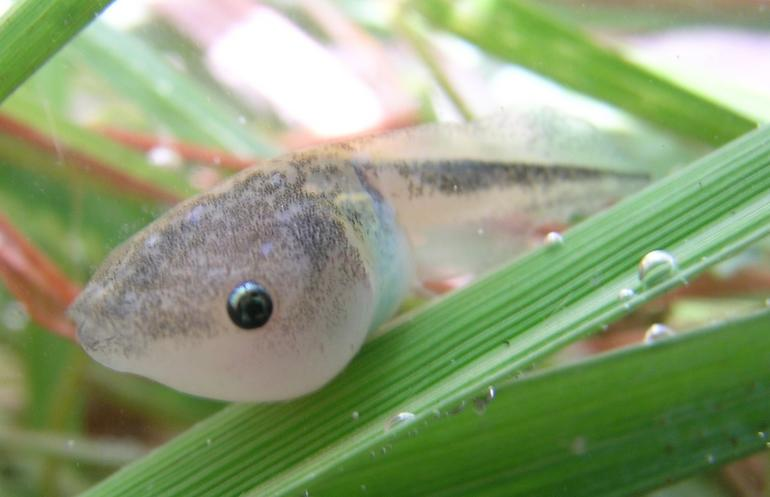
- Adult above, tadpole below

Conservation status
- Least Concern (IUCN 3.1)
- CITES Appendix II (CITES)

Scientific classification
- Kingdom: Animalia
- Phylum: Chordata
- Class: Amphibia
- Order: Anura
- Family: Microhylidae
- Genus: Dyscophus
- Species: D. insularis

Binomial name
- Dyscophus insularis Grandidier, 1872
- Range in brown

= Dyscophus insularis =

Species of frog

Dyscophus insularis is a species of frog in the family Microhylidae. It is endemic to western Madagascar (the two other Dyscophus species are from eastern Madagascar). Its natural habitats are subtropical or tropical dry forests, subtropical or tropical moist lowland forests, dry savanna, moist savanna, intermittent rivers, and intermittent freshwater marshes. It is threatened by habitat loss.
