= Fanasana =

- Location in Madagascar
- Coordinates: 18°50′10″S 48°47′14″E
- Country: Madagascar
- Region: Atsinanana
- District: Vohibinany (district)

Population (2019)Census
  - Total: 5,312
- Time zone: UTC3 (EAT)

Fanasana is a village and commune in the Brickaville district (or: Vohibinany (district)) in the Atsinanana Region, Madagascar.
