= Vohitranivona =

- Location in Madagascar
- Coordinates: 18°43′00″S 49°04′00″E
- Country: Madagascar
- Region: Atsinanana
- District: Vohibinany (district)
- Elevation: 32 m (105 ft)

Population (2019)Census
  - Total: 7,557
- Time zone: UTC3 (EAT)
- Postal code: 508

Vohitranivona is a village and commune in the Brickaville district (or: Vohibinany (district)) in the Atsinanana Region, Madagascar.

It is located near on the banks of the Rongoranga river and the former Route Nationale 2.
