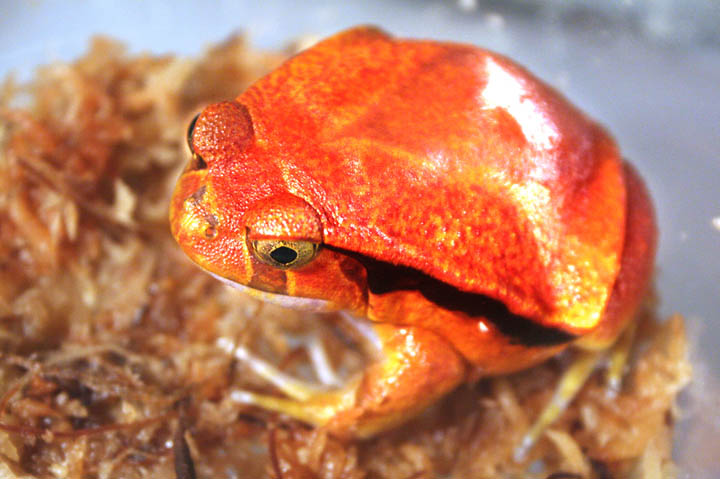
- Dyscophus antongilii

Scientific classification
- Kingdom: Animalia
- Phylum: Chordata
- Class: Amphibia
- Order: Anura
- Family: Microhylidae
- Subfamily: Dyscophinae; Boulenger, 1882
- Genus: Dyscophus; Grandidier, 1872

Diversity
- 3 species
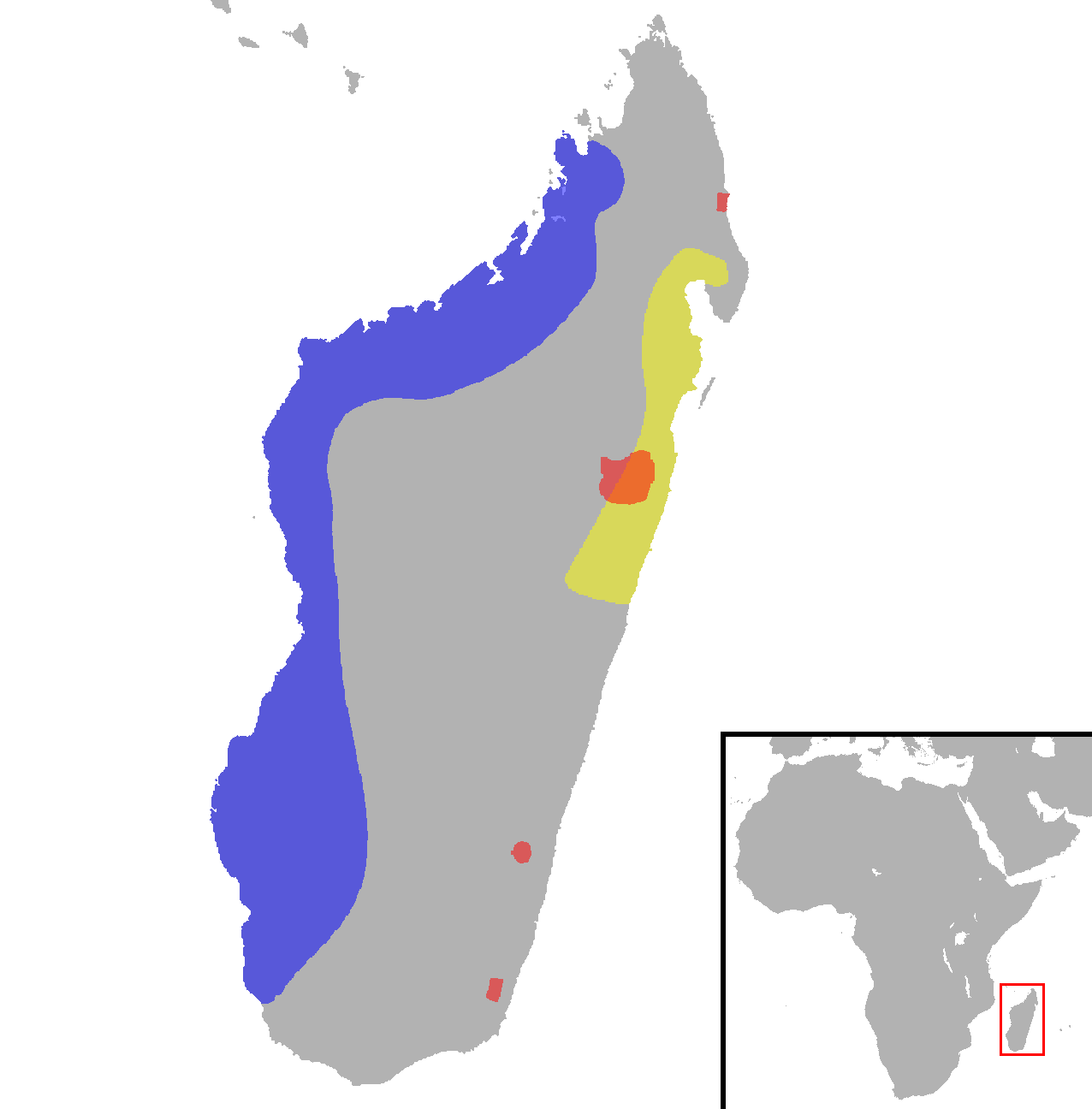
- Distribution of: Red: Dyscophus guineti; Yellow: Dyscophus antongilii; Blue: Dyscophus insularis

= Tomato frog =

Genus of amphibians

Tomato frogs are any of the three species of genus Dyscophus (family Microhylidae): D. antongilii, D. insularis, or D. guineti. Dyscophus is the only genus in subfamily Dyscophinae. They are endemic to Madagascar.

The common name comes from D. antongilii's bright red color. When threatened, a tomato frog puffs up its body. When a predator grabs a tomato frog in its mouth, the frog's skin secretes a thick substance that numbs the predator's eyes and mouth, causing the predator to release the frog to free up its eyes. This substance contains a toxin that occasionally causes allergic reactions in humans, although such allergic reactions are not deadly.

The lifespan of the tomato frog can be from 6 to 8 years. When adult, the colors may vary from yellowish orange to deep red. Tomato frogs will reach sexual maturity in 9–14 months. Females are larger than males and can reach 4 inches (10 cm) in length. Males can reach 2 to 3 inches (5 to 7.5 cm) in length. Most females range from reddish-orange to bright dark red. The bellies are usually more yellowish, and sometimes there are black spots on the throat. But males are not as brightly colored but more of a duller orange or brownish-orange. Juveniles are also dull in color and develop brighter coloration as they mature. According to the Smithsonian National Zoo tomato frog's conservation status has been updated to that of least concern. They breed in the rainy season and are nocturnal. They tend to eat small insects and invertebrates.

== Species ==
There are three different species:

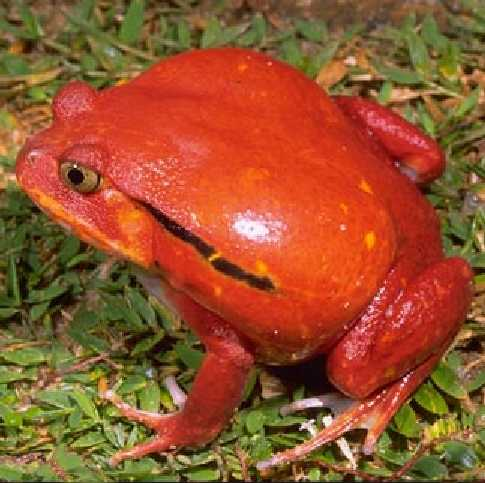
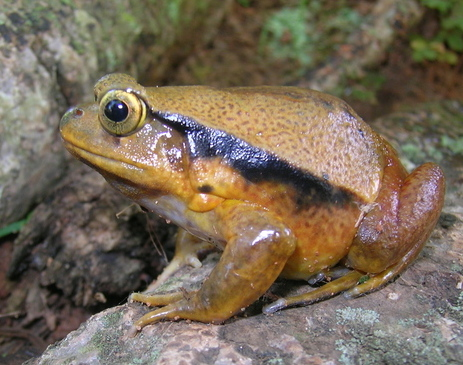
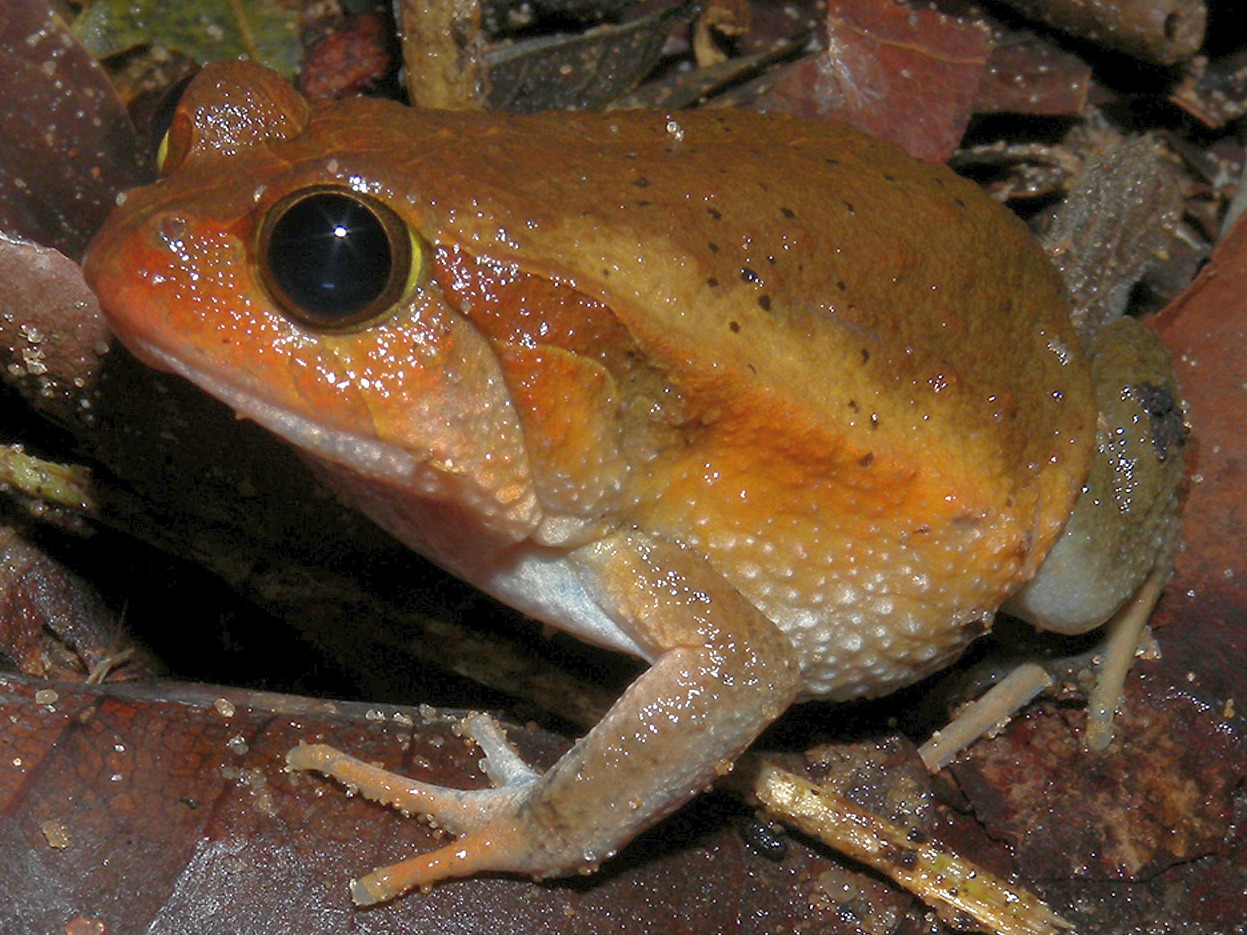
Image	Binomial name and author	Common name	Distribution
	Dyscophus antongilii Grandidier, 1877	Madagascar tomato frog, tomato frog	Madagascar
	Dyscophus guineti (Grandidier, 1875)	Sambava tomato frog	Madagascar
	Dyscophus insularis Grandidier, 1872	Antsouhy tomato frog	Madagascar

== Behavior ==
Tomato frogs target prey within narrow angles by aligning their heads towards it, while projecting their tongues rapidly by transferring momentum from the lower jaw. Elastic energy stored in mouth-opening muscles amplifies mouth and tongue velocities, contingent on the alignment of the lower jaw and tongue. However, for prey at wider angles, tomato frogs align both head and tongue towards it, utilizing a hydrostatic mechanism for tongue projection. This enables capturing prey over broader angle ranges.

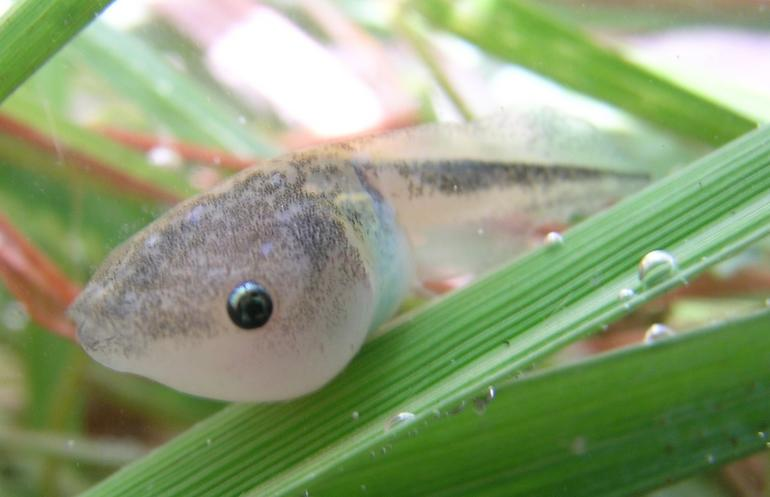
Dyscophus insularis tadpole

== Reproductive activity ==
Tomato frogs lay over 1,000 fresh eggs during every month of the year except for November. Their reproductive activity is high during the months January–May and low between the months June–December.

The tadpoles hatch after around 36 hours after being laid, becoming metamorphs (froglets) after about 45 to 60 days.
