= Ambalarondra =

- Location in Madagascar
- Coordinates: 18°28′00″S 48°59′00″E
- Country: Madagascar
- Region: Atsinanana
- District: Vohibinany (district)
- Elevation: 169 m (554 ft)

Population (2019)Census
  - Total: 12,884
- Time zone: UTC3 (EAT)
- Postal code: 508

Ambalarondra is a village and rural commune in the Brickaville district (or: Vohibinany (district)) in the Atsinanana Region, Madagascar.
