= Malaria in Madagascar =

Despite recent progress, malaria in Madagascar remains a major health problem, and severe malaria is among the top five causes of reported overall mortality. Malaria epidemiology varies considerably in different regions of Madagascar; however, the entire population is considered to be at risk for the disease. The majority of cases are caused by the parasite Plasmodium falciparum. In 2017, the 2018–2022 Malaria National Strategic Plan was drafted, stratifying the country into malaria epidemiologic clusters based on the intensity of malaria transmission. Malaria control and elimination interventions will be defined based on each epidemiologic cluster.

From 2003 to 2013, there were clear impacts observed from malaria control program investments, including decreases in malaria cases and deaths reported through the national Health Management Information System. This trend continued as 2016 MIS data showed a decrease in malaria diagnosed by rapid diagnostic test from 10 percent in 2013 to 5.2 percent in 2016 among children less than five years of age.

== See also ==
- Health in Madagascar
