= Brickaville =

Brickaville Ampasimanolotra
- Location in Madagascar
- Coordinates: 18°49′10″S 49°04′25″E
- Country: Madagascar
- Region: Tamatave
- District: Brickaville District

Population (2019)Census
  - Total: 27,865
- Time zone: UTC3 (EAT)
- Postal code: 508

Brickaville is a town and commune in Atsinanana Region, Madagascar.

Also known as Ampasimanolotra, Brickaville is located along Route nationale 2 (RN 2), 105 km south of Toamasina (the primary seaport of the country) and 220 km east of Antananarivo (the capital). It is also situated alongside the Rianila river. It is a railway station on the Antananarivo - East Coast line.

Its only industry is a sugar refinery plant. It had stopped its production for 13 years but took up operations in 2020.

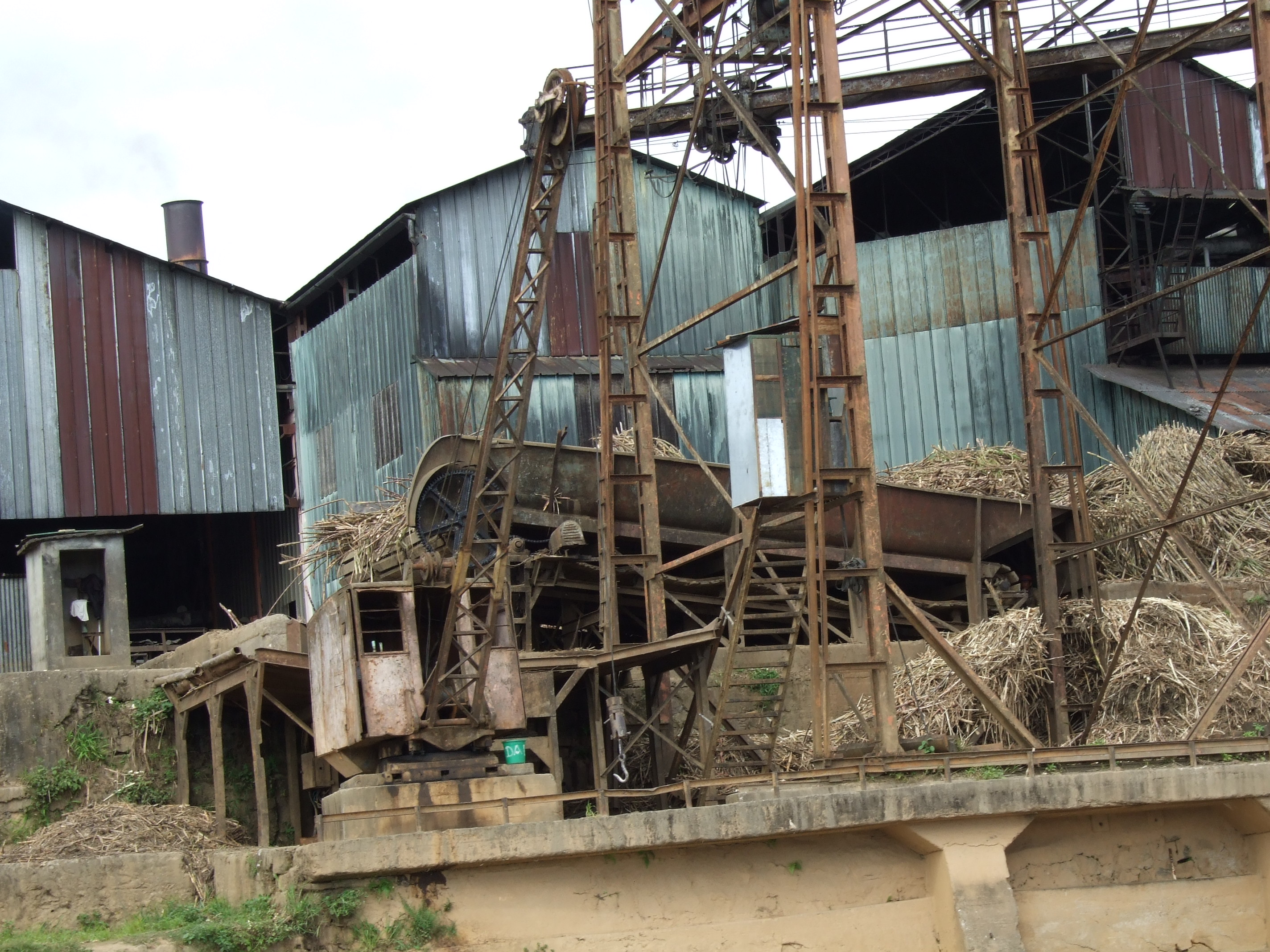
Sugarcane factory in Brickaville in 2007

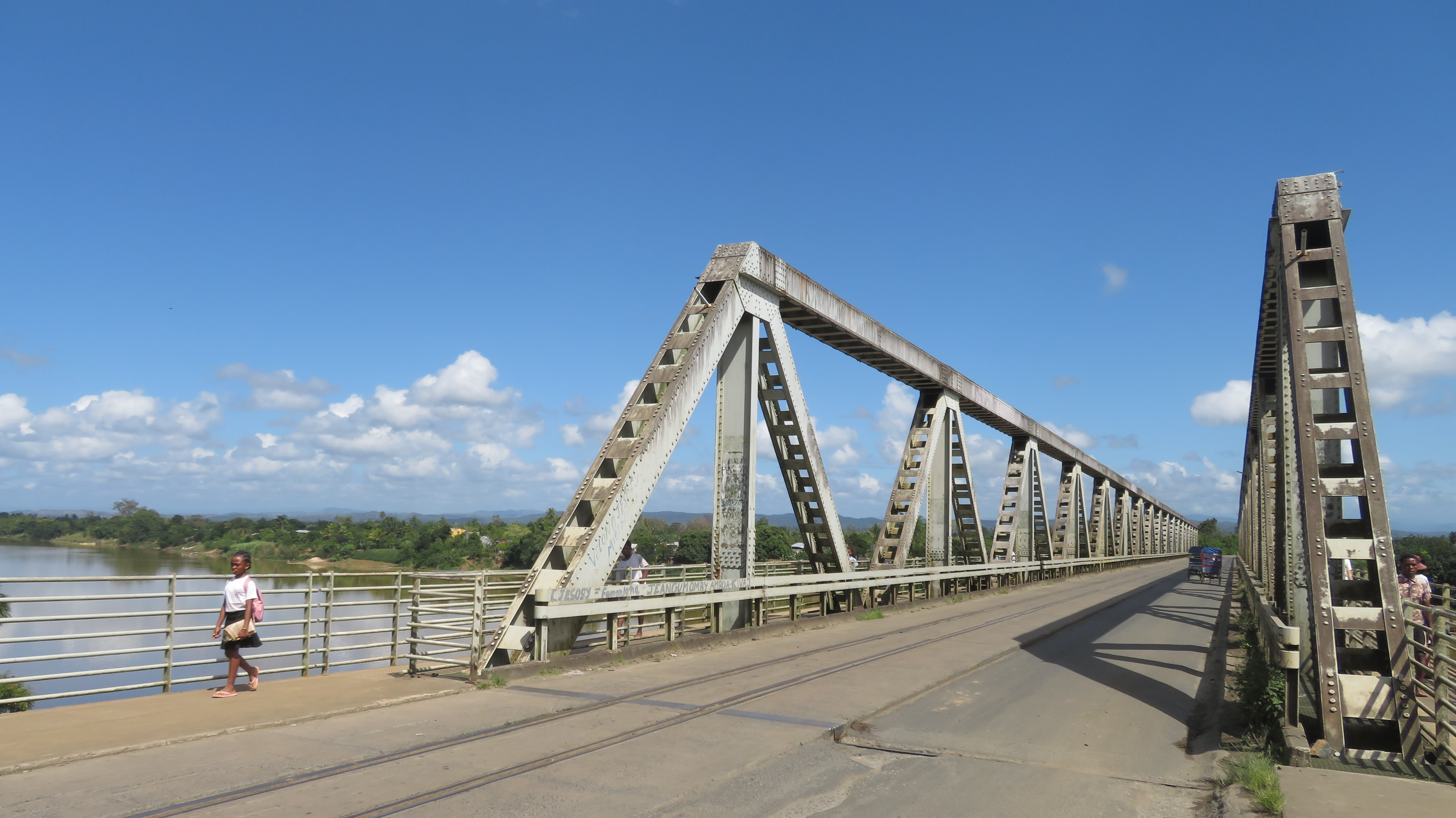
Bridge over Rianila river

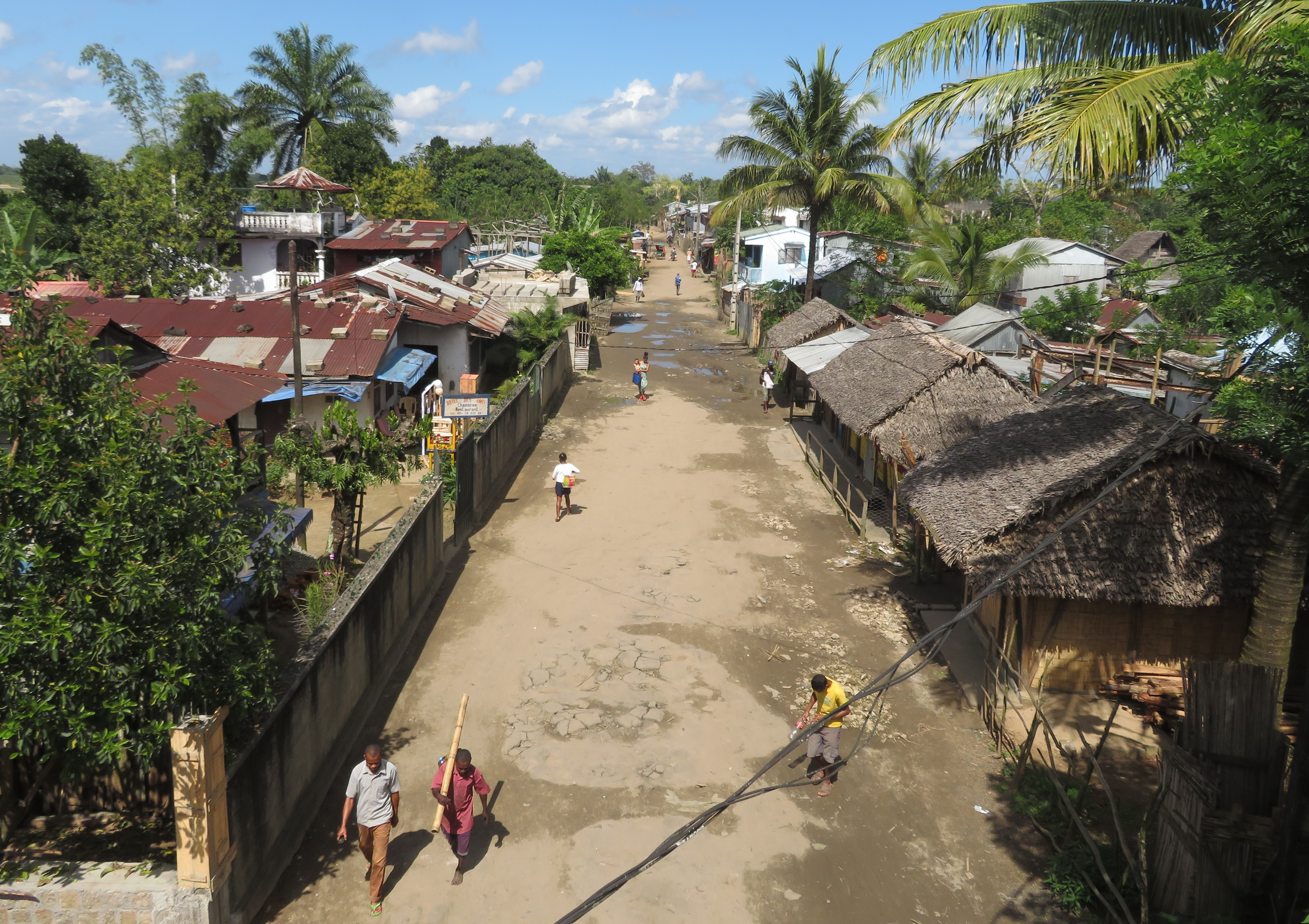
Typical residential area

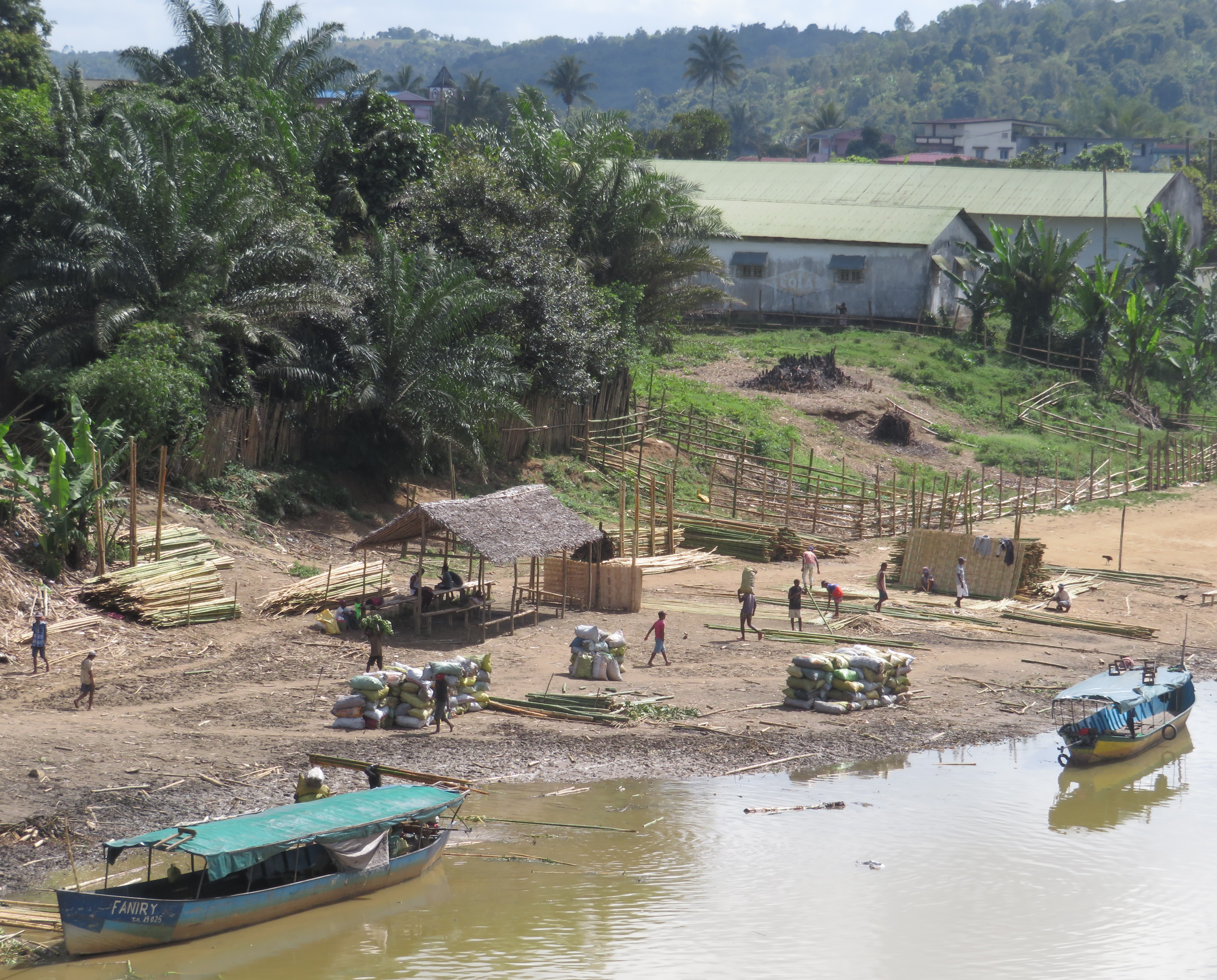
Inland harbour on river Rianila
