= Maroseranana =

- Location in Madagascar
- Country: Madagascar
- Region: Atsinanana
- District: Vohibinany (district)
- Elevation: 367 m (1,204 ft)
- Time zone: UTC3 (EAT)

''Maroseranana is a village and rural commune in the Brickaville district (or: Vohibinany (district)) in the Atsinanana Region, Madagascar.

c'est aussi le noms de la dynastie des 1ers Rois Sakalava de Madagascar, fondateurs des Royaumes Mena Be et Boeny...
