= Henri de Solages =

French Catholic missionary

Servant of God Henri de Solages
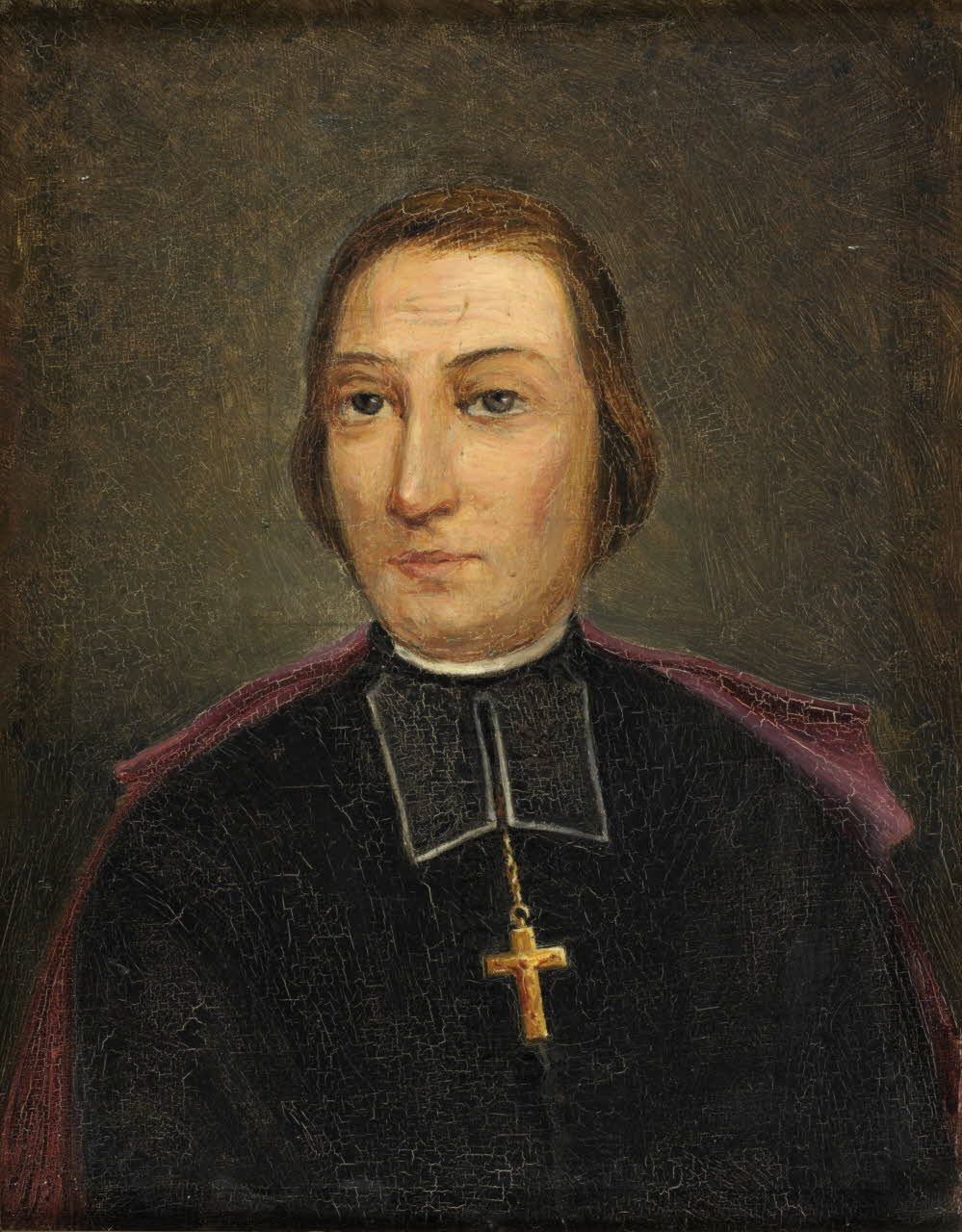

Apostolic prefect of Bourbon
- Born: 21 August 1786; Rabastens
- Residence: Réunion
- Died: 8 December 1832; Andevoranto
- Major shrine: Cathédrale Saint-Joseph de Toamasina

Henri de Solages (21 August 1786 – 8 December 1832) was a French Catholic missionary who advocated for missionary work in the Pacific. In 1829, he was named apostolic prefect to Réunion island. The next year he was named prefect of a very large geographic area in the South Pacific.

He was tortured and killed in Andevoranto, Madagascar in 1832.
