= Vohitra River =

River in Madagascar

Vohitra river
- Map of Malagasy rivers.

Location
- Country: Madagascar
- Region: Alaotra-Mangoro, Atsinanana

Physical characteristics
- Source
  - location: Andaingo
  - elevation: 1,200 metres (3,900 ft)
- Mouth
  - location: Rianila River, near Anivorano Est
  - coordinates: 18°43′40″S 48°57′50″E
- Length: 200 km (120 mi)
- Basin size: 2540 km2

Basin features
- Progression: Andasibe, Moramanga, Anivorano Est
- Tributaries
  - right: Sahatandra

The Vohitra river in Alaotra-Mangoro and Atsinanana regions, is located in central-eastern Madagascar. It drains to the eastern coast. It flows into the Rianila River near Anivorano Est.

It has a hydro-power station at Andekaleka, the Andekaleka Dam.
