= Anivorano Est =

- Location in Madagascar
- Coordinates: 18°44′00″S 48°59′00″E
- Country: Madagascar
- Region: Atsinanana
- District: Vohibinany (district)
- Elevation: 25 m (82 ft)

Population (2018)Census
  - Total: 6,664
- Time zone: UTC3 (EAT)
- Postal code: 508

Anivorano Est (also called Anivorano Gare) is a village and commune in the district of Brickaville Vohibinany (district), Atsinanana Region, Madagascar.
