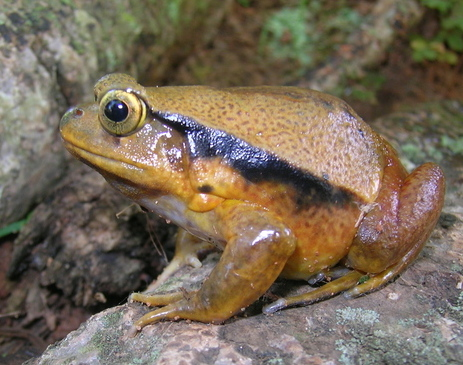

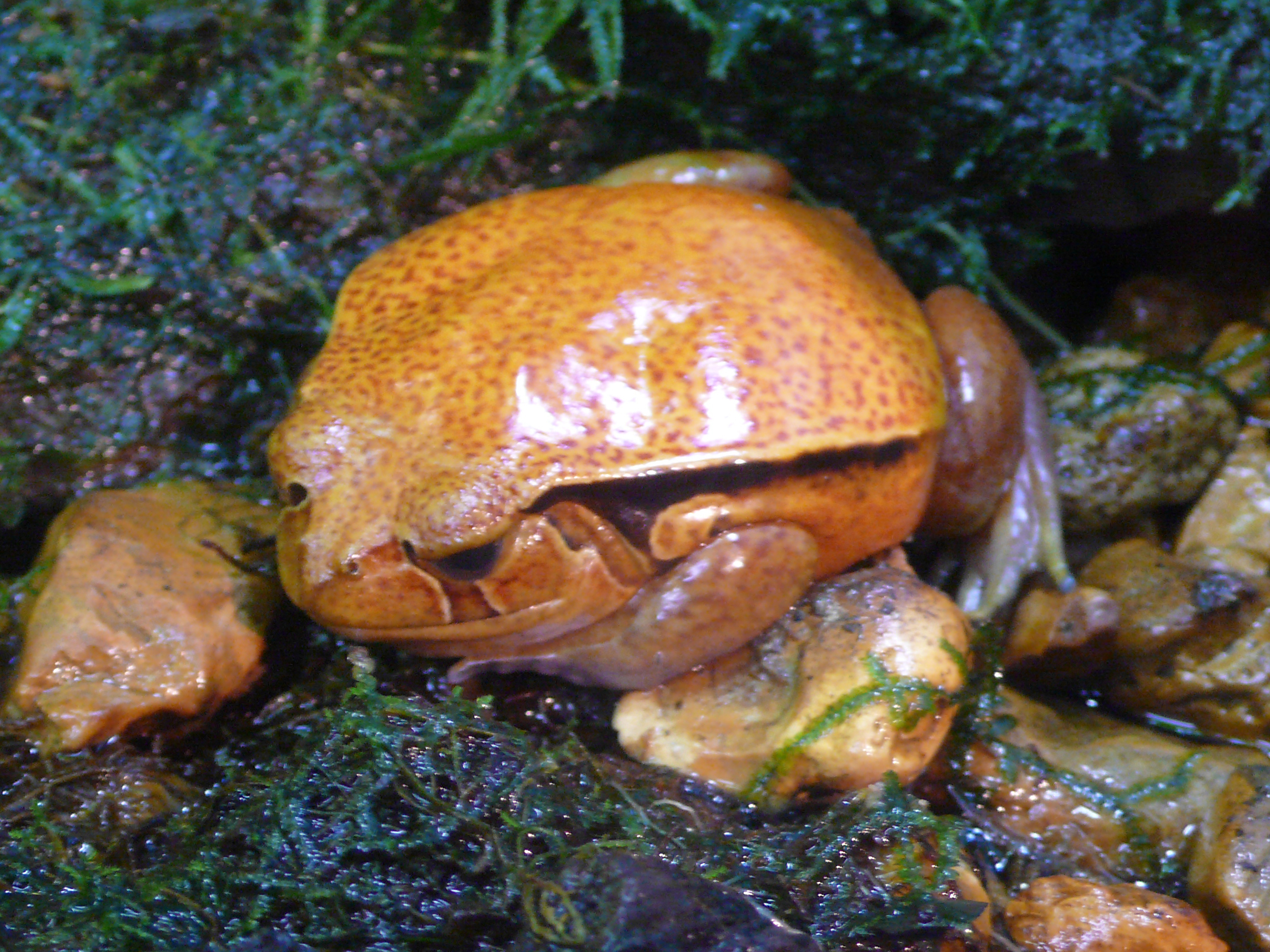

Conservation status
- Least Concern (IUCN 3.1)
- CITES Appendix II

Scientific classification
- Kingdom: Animalia
- Phylum: Chordata
- Class: Amphibia
- Order: Anura
- Family: Microhylidae
- Genus: Dyscophus
- Species: D. guineti

Binomial name
- Dyscophus guineti (Grandidier, 1875)
- Range in brown

= Dyscophus guineti =

Species of amphibian

Dyscophus guineti, the false tomato frog or the Sambava tomato frog, is a species of frog in the family Microhylidae. It is endemic to Madagascar. Its natural habitats are subtropical or tropical moist lowland forest, subtropical or tropical swamps, swamps, freshwater marshes, intermittent freshwater marshes, and heavily degraded former forest. It is threatened by habitat loss.

== Description ==
The Dyscophus guineti male frogs are yellowish, and in size 60-65mm. The female frogs are red- orange often with many small reticulations, in size 90-95mm. Some of these frogs have an Odontoma which are tumors from a tooth that also contain tissue. These cause bad tooth eruption and displacement of erupted teeth. Another aspect which concerns these frogs is the way they capture their prey using their tongues and mouth. It is based on how close their prey is to them, the way they capture it changes. If their prey is smaller and at an azimuthal location of less than 40A degrees, they will aim their heads at the prey and not their tongues. If their prey is larger and at an azimuthal location greater than 40A then they proceed to aim both their head and tongue at their prey. The process when the prey is larger is better known as hydrostatic elongation. The Dyscophus guinteti also has tongue movements separate of the lower jaw which changes their speed, momentum, and projection of their tongue in different situations.

== Ecology and Conservation ==
In addition to its unique appearance and feeding behaviors, Dyscophus guineti is an important species in the Malagasy ecosystem. They are commonly found in mid-altitude regions along the east coast of Madagascar. This species thrives in humid forests and marsh habitats. While this species is native to these environments, their unique coloring has left them highly sought after in pet trades. This highlights the importance of increasing conservation measures to ensure they continue to thrive in the wild. A morphologically similar microhylid frog species to D. guineti called Dyscophus antongili have been banned in Appendix I of the convention on the International Trade in Endangered Species, However, D. guineti are not included. This serves as an issue because due to their flashy coloring, they are highly sought after in pet trades and often sold as pets.

== Sources ==
- AmeyZoo: Frogs that are commonly kept as pets
- Giulia Tessa, Fabio M. Guarino, Jasmin E. Randrianirina & Franco Andreone (2011) Age structure in the false tomato frog Dyscophus guineti from eastern Madagascar compared to the closely related D. antongilii (Anura, Microhylidae), African Journal of Herpetology, 60:1, 84–88, DOI: 10.1080/21564574.2011.561881.

Chiari, Y., Orozco-terWengel, P., Vences, M. et al. Genetic identification of units for conservation in tomato frogs, genus Dyscophus. Conserv Genet 7, 473–482 (2006).
