= Antsampanana =

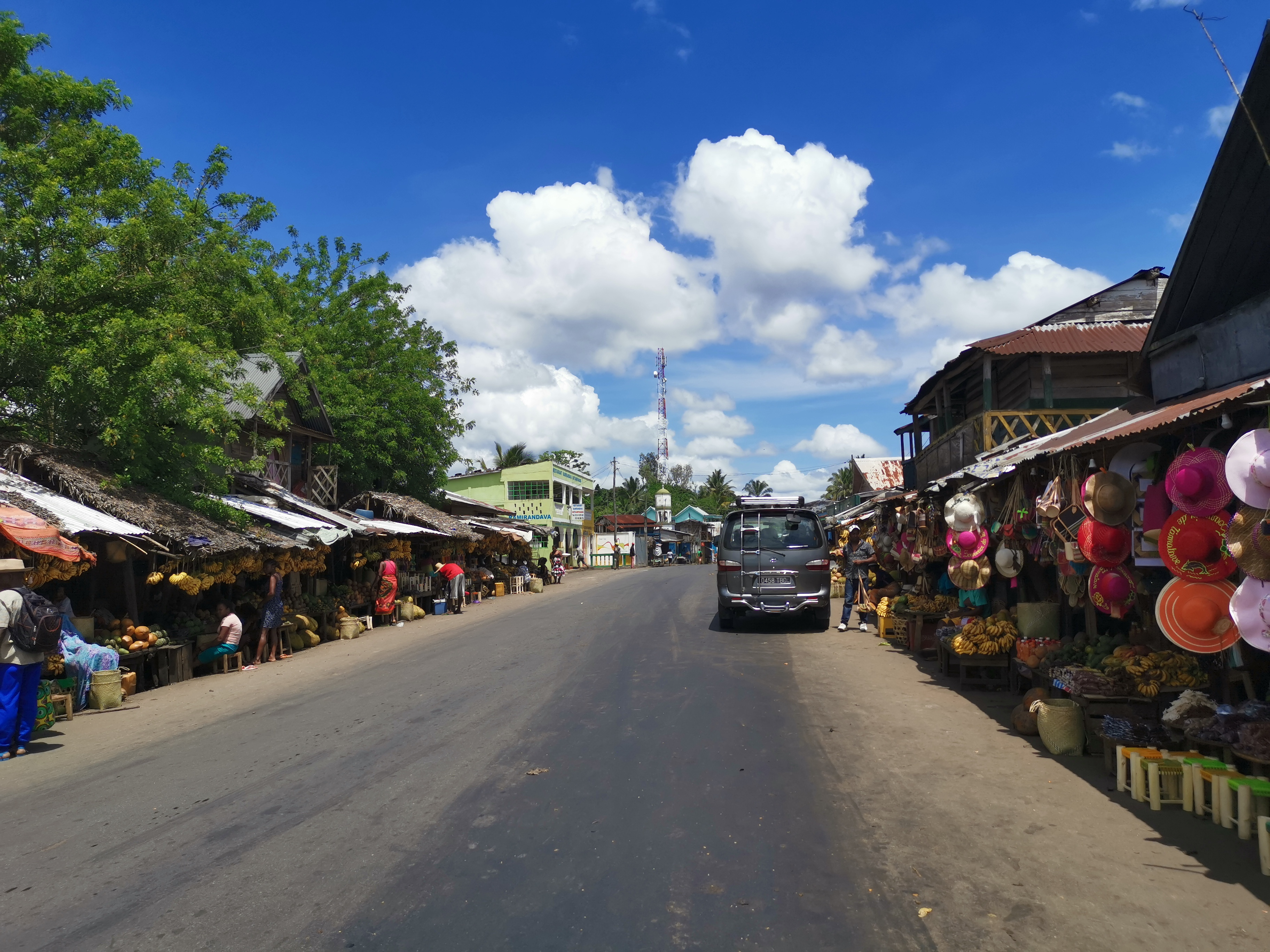
- RN at Antsampana

- Location in Madagascar
- Coordinates: 18°58′52″S 48°56′31″E
- Country: Madagascar
- Region: Atsinanana
- District: Brickaville District
- Municipality: Mahatsara

Government
  - Mayor: Eugène Rahavana
- Time zone: UTC3 (EAT)
- Postal code: 508

Antsampanana [vatʷˈmanɖʐʲ] is a village in Atsinanana Region, Madagascar. It belongs to the municipality of Mahatsara. It is located along Route Nationale (RN) 2, at the northern terminus of RN 11 (which heads south to Vatomandry). A memorial dedicated to the victims of the Malagasy Uprising of 1947 was erected in the village centre. There is a small mosque in Main Street. Antsampanana's market area is a common stopping point for trips.

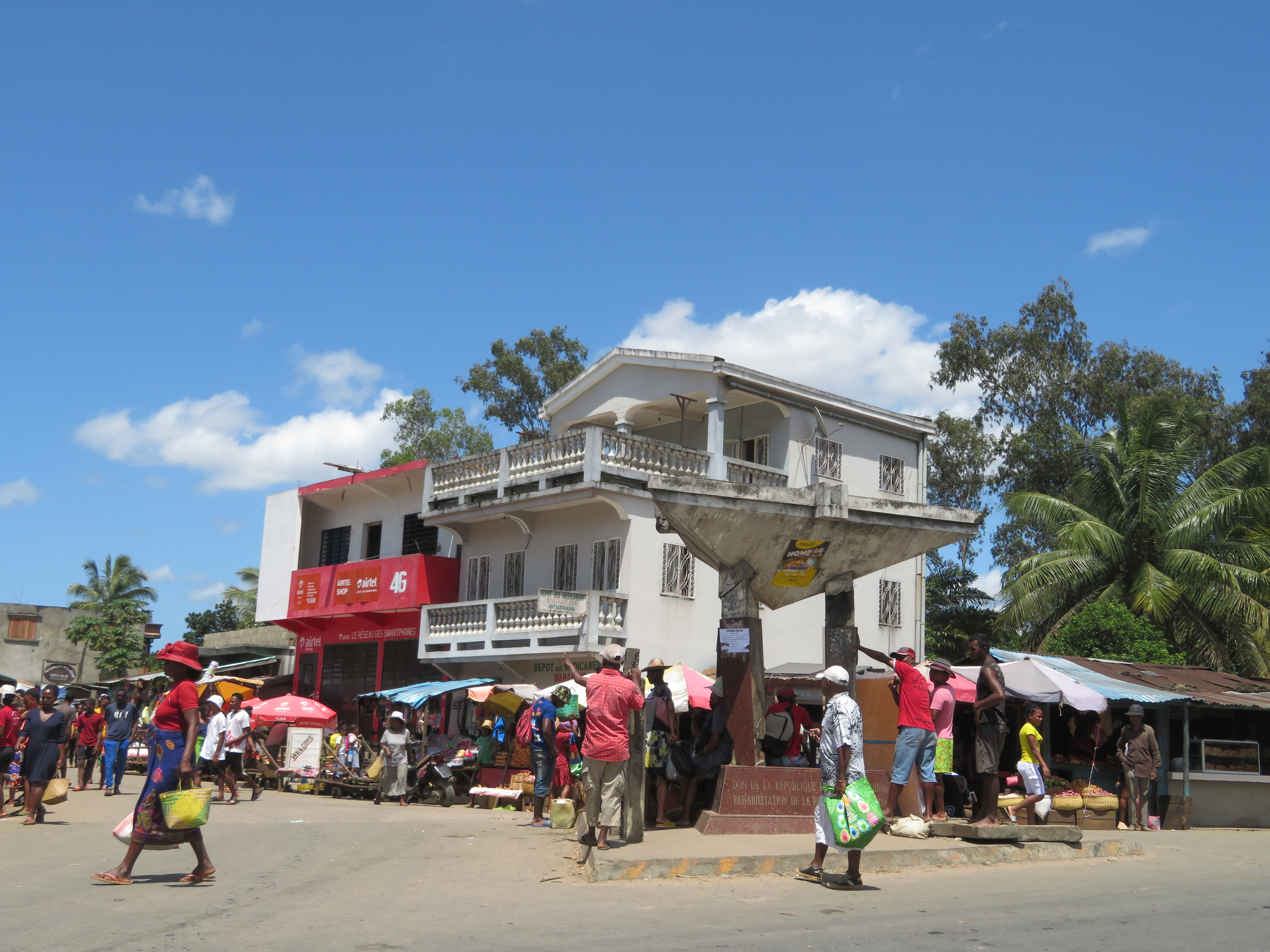
Memorial in the village centre

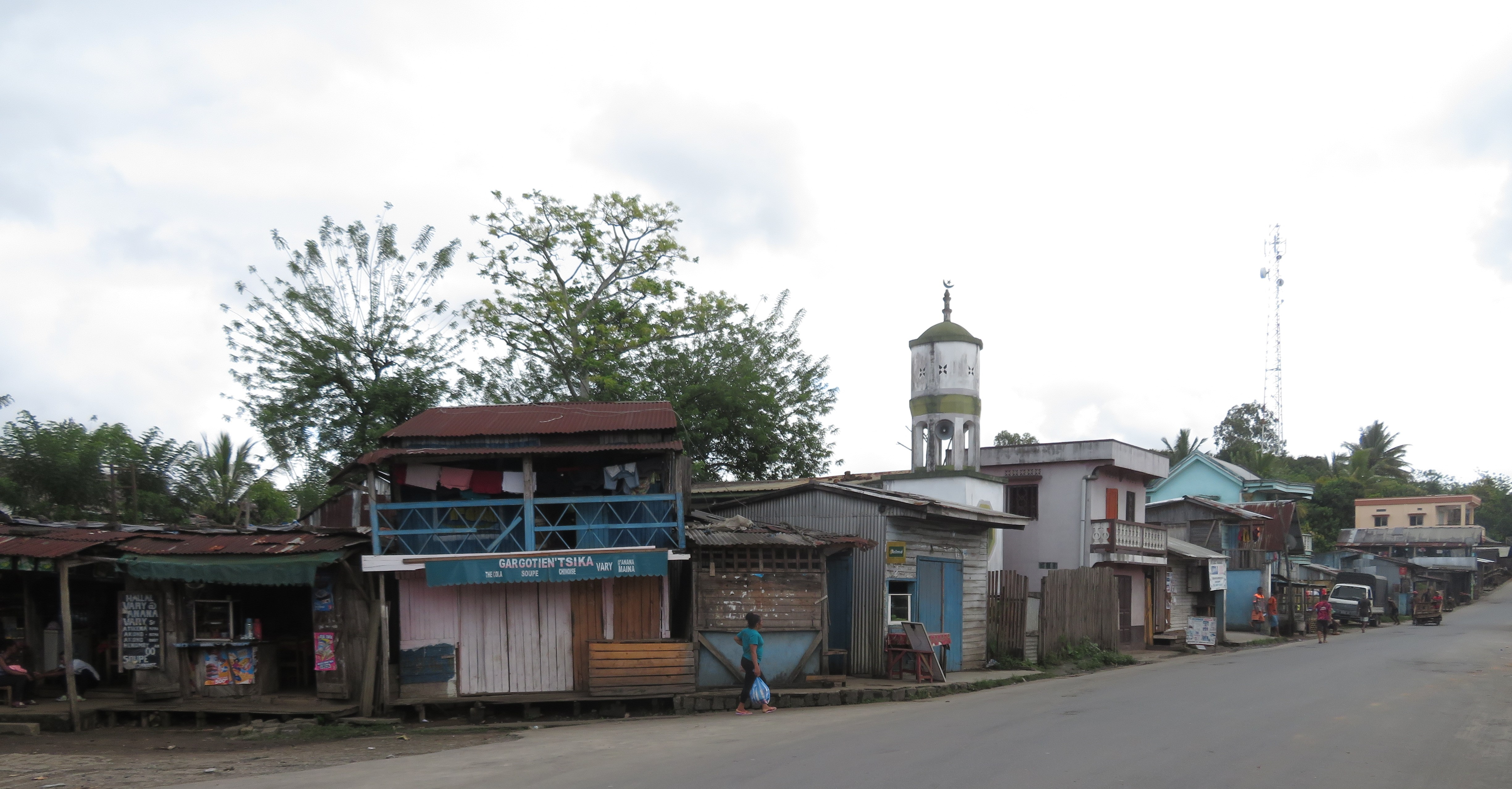
Mosque in Main Street
