= Rianila River =

River in Madagascar

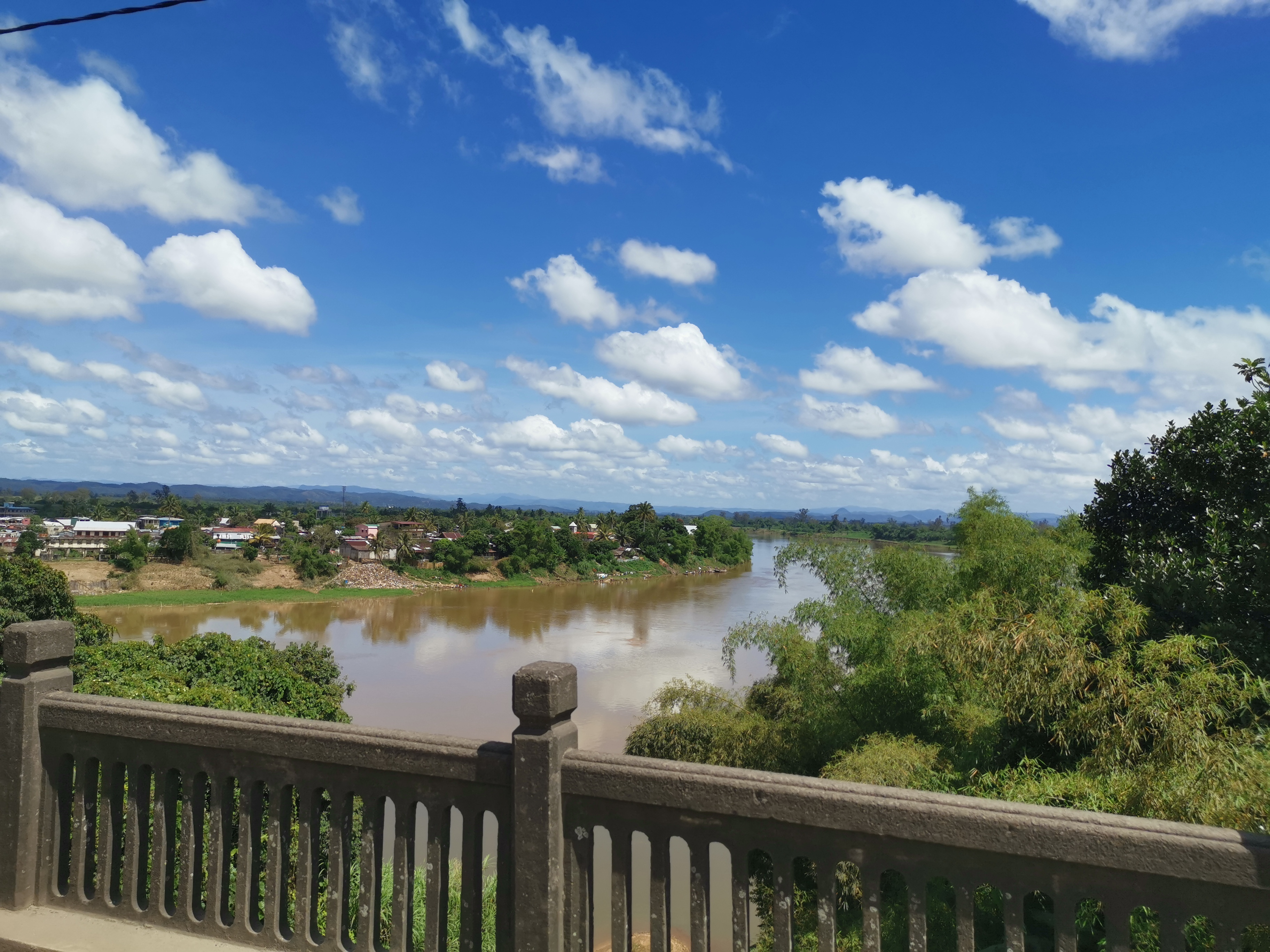

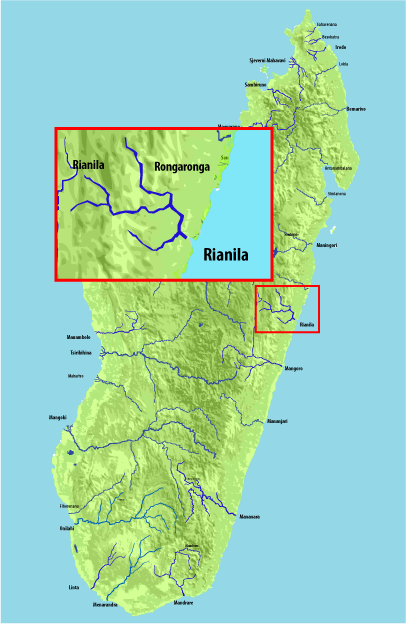
- Map of Malagasy rivers.

Location
- Country: Madagascar
- Region: Atsinanana
- City: Brickaville

Physical characteristics
- Source
  - location: Fahona Massif
  - elevation: 1,450 m (4,760 ft)
- Mouth
  - location: Andevoranto, Brickaville, Atsinanana
  - coordinates: 18°58′35″S 49°06′10″E
  - elevation: 0 m (0 ft)
- Length: 134 km (83 mi)
- Basin size: 7,820 km^{2} (3,020 sq mi)
- Discharge
  - location: Near mouth
  - average: (Period: 1971–2000)325.2 m^{3}/s (11,480 cu ft/s)

Basin features
- River system: Rianila River
- Tributaries
  - left: Rongaronga
  - right: Iaroka, Vohitra,

Rianila is a river in the Atsinanana region in eastern Madagascar. It flows down from the central highlands to flow into the Indian Ocean south of Brickaville at Andevoranto. Its largest tributary is the Rongaronga, which joins it near Brickaville as well as the Iaroka and Vohitra Rivers.

The river was previously called the Iharoka River by Western explorers (and the Jark River in a few sources).

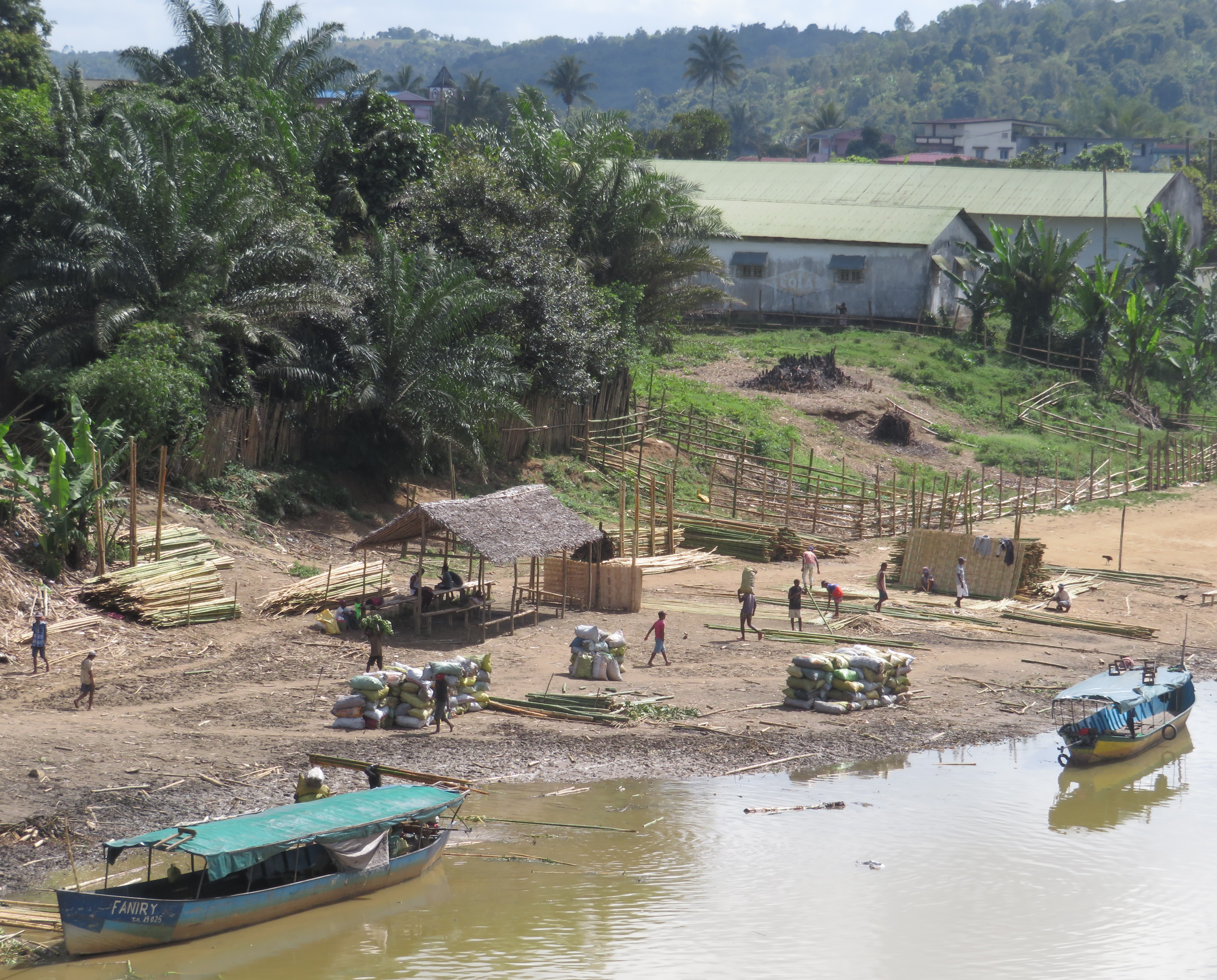
Inland harbour on Riaila river in Brickaville
