= Amboasary (disambiguation) =

Amboasary may refer to places in Madagascar:

- Amboasary-Antambolo, in Itasy
- Amboasary Sud, a town in Anosy
- Amboasary Gara, a town near Moramanga, in Alaotra-Mangoro
- Amboasary river, a river in Alaotra-Mangoro
- Amboasary Nord, a town in Ankazobe District in Analamanga, Madagascar
- Amboasary, Atsinanana, a rural municipality in Marolambo District, Atsinanana
