= Betampona, Marolambo =

Betampona (near Marolambo)
- Location in Madagascar
- Coordinates: 17°53′S 49°14′E
- Country: Madagascar
- Region: Atsinanana
- District: Marolambo District

Population (2019)Census
  - Total: 13,466
- Time zone: UTC3 (EAT)

Betampona (near Marolambo) is a rural commune located in the Atsinanana region of eastern Madagascar. It belongs to the Marolambo District.

== See also ==
- Betampona Reserve
