= Mangerivola Special Reserve =

Wildlife reserve

- IUCN category IV (habitat/species management area)
- Location within Madagascar
- Location: Eastern Madagascar
- Coordinates: 18°12′00″S 48°54′30″E
- Area: 270.47 km^{2} (104.43 sq mi)
- Established: 1958; 68 years ago
- Governing body: Parcs Nationaux Madagascar – ANGAP

Mangerivola Special Reserve is a wildlife reserve in the east of Madagascar. It was established in 1958 and is a hotspot for bird-watchers due to the one hundred species found there, including 63 endemics and many local endemics. There are also seven species of lemur and rare chameleons such as the Lance-nosed chameleon (Calumma gallus) which is registered as endangered on the IUCN Red List of Threatened Species.

== Geography ==
Mangerivola Special Reserve is a 13,005 hectares (32,140 acres) nature reserve in the Atsinanana region, to the west of Toamasina and south of Fito. The highest peak on the reserve is Mangerivola at 1,484 metres (4,869 ft) and the landscape consists of hills, deep valleys, waterfalls (up to 80 metres (260 ft)) and lakes. Two of rivers (Ambotohaka and Ivondro) provide water for the hydroelectric power at the Volobe dam, and along with the Marongolo, Ranomena and Sanalaotra rivers, irrigate the rice fields below the reserve and supply drinking water.

There are few visitors due to the steep terrain and impassable roads during the wet season.

== Flora and fauna ==
The natural vegetation on the reserve is dense, low- and mid-altitude, humid evergreen forest. Anthostema madagascariense, Myristicaceae and Sarcolaenaceae are the dominant trees in the low-altitude forest, and Burseraceae, Cunoniaceae, Ebenaceae, Monimiaceae and Myrtaceae in the mid-altitude forest. In the north and north-east the old-growth forest has been cleared and there is some secondary forest growth with Harungana madagascariensis and traveller's palm Ravenala madagascariensis. The reserve has 325 species of plant of which 170 are endemic.

One hundred species of birds have been recorded on the reserve, of which 63 are endemic to Madagascar, including the endangered Madagascar serpent eagle (Eutriorchis astur) and the red owl (Tyto soumagnei), which is a vulnerable species on the IUNC Red List. There are also nineteen species of reptiles and seven species of lemurs: Indri indri, Propithecus, Varecia variegata, Eulemur fulvus, Eulemur rubriventer, Hapalemur griseus and the aye-aye. Among the reptiles, there are nineteen species, including Calumma gallus, Calumma furcifer and the Madagascar tree boa Sanzinia madagascariensis.
