= Andonabe Sud =

Andonabe Sud Andonabe Atsimo
- Location in Madagascar
- Coordinates: 19°53′S 48°13′E
- Country: Madagascar
- Region: Atsinanana
- District: Marolambo District
- Elevation: 524 m (1,719 ft)

Population (2019)census
  - Total: 10,503
- Time zone: UTC3 (EAT)
- Postal code: 513

Andonabe Sud is a rural municipality located in the Marolambo District, Atsinanana region of eastern Madagascar
