= Ifito =

- Location in Madagascar
- Country: Madagascar
- Region: Atsinanana
- District: Toamasina II

Population (2019)Census
  - Total: 8,744
- Time zone: UTC3 (EAT)
- postal code: 502

Ifito is a rural municipality in the district of Toamasina II (district), in the region of Atsinanana, on east coast of Madagascar.

== Geography ==
It lies at the Ivondro River.

== Economy ==
The economy is based on agriculture. The municipality is famous for its hemp plantations.
