= Ambatofisaka II =

Coordinates: 20°05′S 47°54′E

- Location in Madagascar
- Country: Madagascar
- Region: Atsinanana
- District: Marolambo District

Area
  - Total: 277 km^{2} (107 sq mi)

Population (2019)census
  - Total: 11,724
  - Ethnicities: Betsimisaraka Betsileo and Merina
- Time zone: UTC3 (EAT)
- Postal code: 513

Ambatofisaka II is a rural municipality located in the Atsinanana region of eastern Madagascar. It belongs to the Marolambo District.

The majority of its inhabitants are Betsimisaraka.

Eleven Fokontany (villages) belong to this municipality: Ambatofisaka II, Vofilambo, Ampasimazava, Anosiato, Ankiboka, Sahanambo, Anakalotre, Ambolomadinika, Antanjomanga, Ambalafarihy, Anosy, Sandranamby and Ambinanimangabe.
