= Amporoforo (Toamasina) =

- Location in Madagascar
- Coordinates: 17°50′10″S 49°08′15″E
- Country: Madagascar
- Region: Atsinanana
- District: Toamasina II
- Elevation: 229 m (751 ft)

Population (2019)Census
  - Total: 5,769
- Time zone: UTC3 (EAT)
- Postal code: 501

Amporoforo is a rural commune in the district of Toamasina II (district), in the region of Atsinanana, on the east coast of Madagascar. It is situated 50 km north-west of Toamasina.

== Economy ==
The economy is based on agriculture. Rice, manioc & corn are grown, other crops are lychee, cloves, cacao, coffee, papaya, banana and sugar cane.
