= Androrangavola =

- Location in Madagascar
- Coordinates: 20°16′S 47°09′E
- Country: Madagascar
- Region: Atsinanana
- District: Marolambo District
- Elevation: 771 m (2,530 ft)

Population (2019)census
  - Total: 9,542
  - Ethnicities: Betsimisaraka
- Time zone: UTC3 (EAT)
- Postal code: 513

Androrangavola is a rural municipality located in the Marolambo District, Atsinanana region of eastern Madagascar
