= Lohavanana =

- Location in Madagascar
- Coordinates: 19°52′S 48°02′E
- Country: Madagascar
- Region: Atsinanana
- District: Marolambo District
- Elevation estim.: 750 m (2,460 ft)

Population (2019)census
  - Total: 7,952
- Time zone: UTC3 (EAT)
- Postal code: 513

Lohavanana is a commune located in the Atsinanana region of eastern Madagascar. It belongs to the Marolambo District.

== Religion ==
- FJKM - Fiangonan'i Jesoa Kristy eto Madagasikara (Church of Jesus Christ in Madagascar)
