= Sahakevo =

Sahakerevo
- Location in Madagascar
- Coordinates: 20°17′S 47°50′E
- Country: Madagascar
- Region: Atsinanana
- District: Marolambo District

Area
  - Total: 347 km^{2} (134 sq mi)
- Elevation estim.: 144 m (472 ft)

Population (2019)census
  - Total: 14,885
- Time zone: UTC3 (EAT)
- postal code: 513

Sahakevo is a municipality located in the Atsinanana region of eastern Madagascar. It belongs to the Marolambo District.

The commune is situated in a remote area of Madagascar. It is situated at 60km south of Marolambo on the Onive River.
