= Ambodinonoka =

- Location in Madagascar
- Country: Madagascar
- Region: Atsinanana
- District: Marolambo District

Population (2019)census
  - Total: 13,888
- Time zone: UTC3 (EAT)
- Postal code: 513

Ambodinonoka is a rural municipality located in the Atsinanana region of eastern Madagascar. It is in the Marolambo District.

The municipality is crossed by the Nosivolo River. The majority of its inhabitants are Betsimisaraka.
