= Ambohimilanja =

- Location in Madagascar
- Country: Madagascar
- Region: Atsinanana
- District: Marolambo District

Population (2019)census
  - Total: 15,208
- Time zone: UTC3 (EAT)

Ambohimilanja is a rural municipality located in the Atsinanana region of eastern Madagascar. It is located in the Marolambo District.
