= Andondabe =

Commune in Atsinanana, Madagascar

- Location in Madagascar
- Coordinates: 17°46′00″S 49°23′05″E
- Country: Madagascar
- Region: Atsinanana
- District: Toamasina II

Population (2019)Census
  - Total: 15,058
- Time zone: UTC3 (EAT)
- Postal code: 502

Andondabe is a rural commune in the district of Toamasina II (district), in the region of Atsinanana, on the east coast of Madagascar.

== Economy ==
The economy is based on agriculture. Rice is grown, other crops are lychee, cloves and coffee.

== Infra structure ==
Andondabe is connected to Foulepointe by the unpaved Provincial road 3A.
