= Ambodiriana =

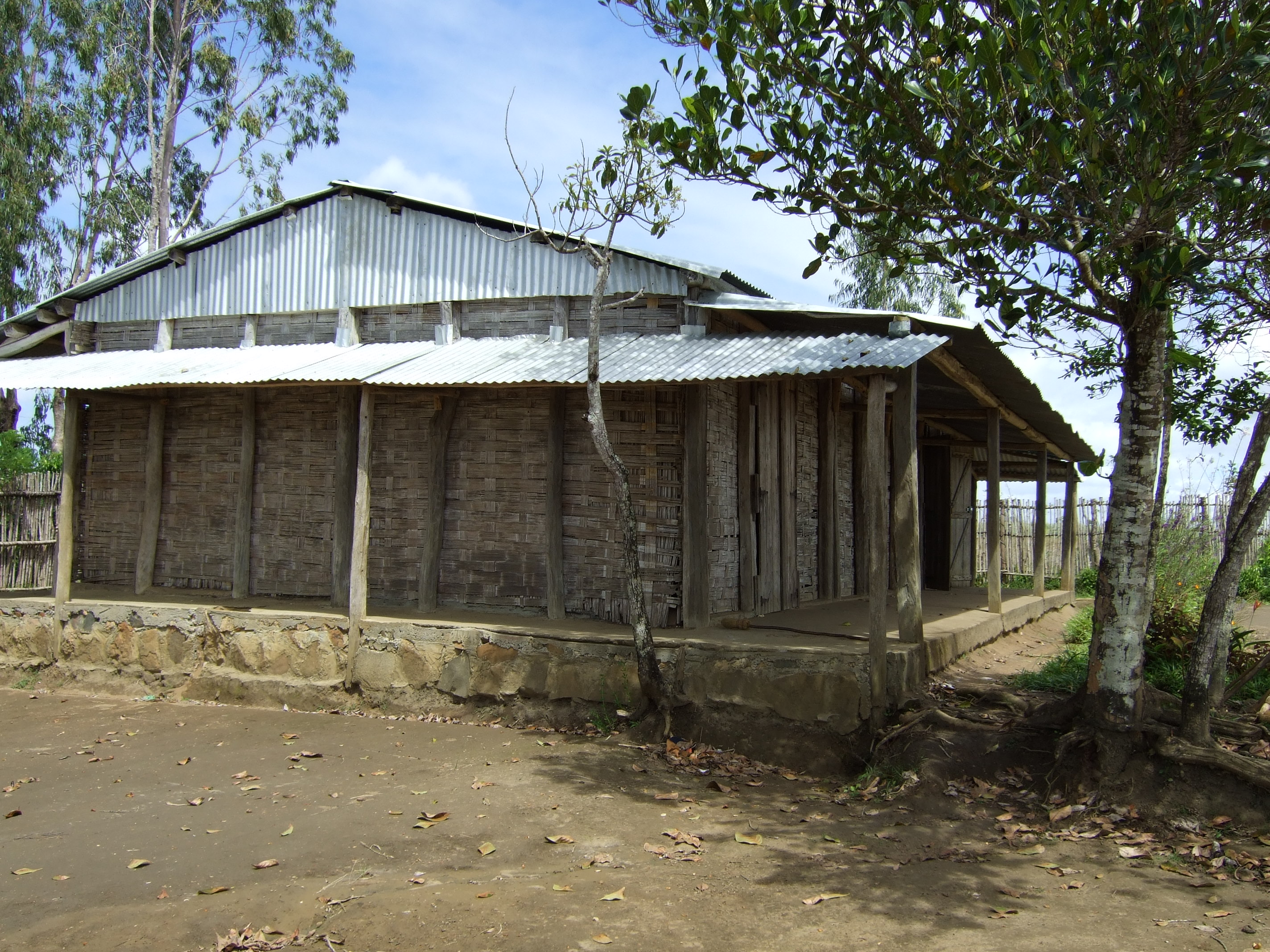
- The school of Ambodiriana

- Location in Madagascar
- Coordinates: 17°53′10″S 49°11′15″E
- Country: Madagascar
- Region: Atsinanana
- District: Toamasina II
- Established: 1960

Area
  - Total: 226 km^{2} (87 sq mi)

Population (2019)Census
  - Total: 9,861
- Time zone: UTC3 (EAT)
- Postal code: 501

Ambodiriana is a rural commune in the district of Toamasina II (district), in the region of Atsinanana, on the east coast of Madagascar.

== Economy ==
The economy is based on agriculture. Rice, manioc & corn are grown, other crops are lychee, cloves, cacao, coffee, papaya, banana and sugar cane.

== Rivers ==
Two rivers cross the municipality: Ivoloina and Ifontsy.

== Nature ==
- The Betampona Reserve is partly located in this municipality.
