= Anosiarivo =

Anosiarivo Anosiarivo I
- Location in Madagascar
- Country: Madagascar
- Region: Atsinanana
- District: Marolambo District

Area
  - Total: 140 km^{2} (54 sq mi)

Population (2019)census
  - Total: 8,101
- Time zone: UTC3 (EAT)
- Postal code: 513

Anosiarivo is a rural municipality located in the Atsinanana region of eastern Madagascar. It belongs to the Marolambo District.

The commune is situated in a remote area of Madagascar. It is still covered at 44% with native forests.

6 fokontany (villages) belong to the municipality: Anosiarivo I, Ambalapaiso, Ambalasavoka, Beanana, Befotaka and Maintimbato. 44% of the municipality is covered with forests.
