= Ambalapaiso II =

- Location in Madagascar
- Country: Madagascar
- Region: Atsinanana
- District: Marolambo District

Area
  - Total: 277 km^{2} (107 sq mi)

Population (2019)census
  - Total: 2,861
- Time zone: UTC3 (EAT)
- Postal code: 513

Ambalapaiso II is a rural municipality located in the Atsinanana region of eastern Madagascar. It belongs to the Marolambo District.

The majority of its inhabitants are Betsimisaraka.

4 Fokontany (villages) belong to this municipality: Ambalapaiso II, Ambatomitsangana, Ambohimalaza and Ambatomasina.

The municipality was created by splitting the former commune into two after the last communal elections: Ambodivoahangy and Ambalapaiso II. The surface of these municipalities had not yet been determined.
