= Ampasibe Onibe =

- Location in Madagascar
- Coordinates: 17°37′28″S 49°20′27″E
- Country: Madagascar
- Region: Atsinanana
- District: Toamasina II

Area
  - Total: 194 km^{2} (75 sq mi)
- Elevation: 57 m (187 ft)

Population ((2001))
  - Total: 18,095
- Time zone: UTC3 (EAT)
- Postal code: 502

Ampasibe Onibe is a rural municipality in the district of Toamasina II (district), in the region of Atsinanana, on the northern part of the east coast of Madagascar.

== Economy ==
The economy is based on agriculture.

== Rivers ==
Ampasibe Onibe is situated on the Onibe River but also the Fanifarana river crosses the municipality.
