= Leioproctus brochellus =

Scientific classification
- Kingdom: Animalia
- Phylum: Arthropoda
- Clade: Pancrustacea
- Class: Insecta
- Order: Hymenoptera
- Family: Colletidae
- Genus: Leioproctus
- Species: L. brochellus

Binomial name
- Leioproctus brochellus Batley, 2025

Species of bee

Leioproctus brochellus, or Leioproctus (Euryglossidia) brochellus, is a species of bee in the family Colletidae and subfamily Colletinae. It is endemic to Australia. It was described by entomologist Michael Batley in 2025.

== Etymology ==
The specific epithet brochellus (Latin: "projecting") alludes to an anatomical similarity (a rectangular tooth on the male clypeus) it shares with Leioproctus brochus.

== Description ==
The holotype male body length is 4.2 mm, female body length about 5.5 mm. Integumental colouration is mainly black, with the metasoma brown. The hair is white to brown.

== Distribution and habitat ==
The species occurs in south-west Western Australia. The type locality is 12 km north-east of Bungalbin Hill in the Helena and Aurora Range, some 100 km north of Southern Cross in the Great Western Woodlands.

== Behaviour ==
The adults are flying mellivores. Flowering plants visited by the bees include Androcalva crispa.

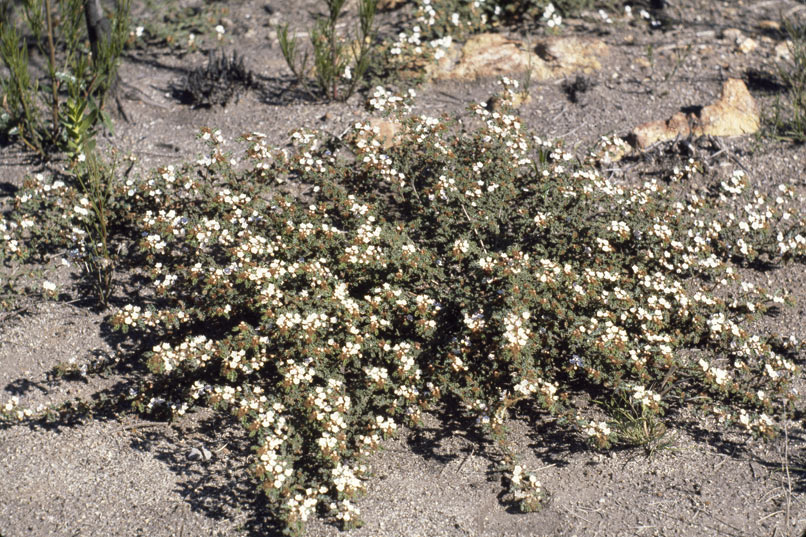
Androcalva crispa (crisped-leaf commersonia), a forage plant of the bees

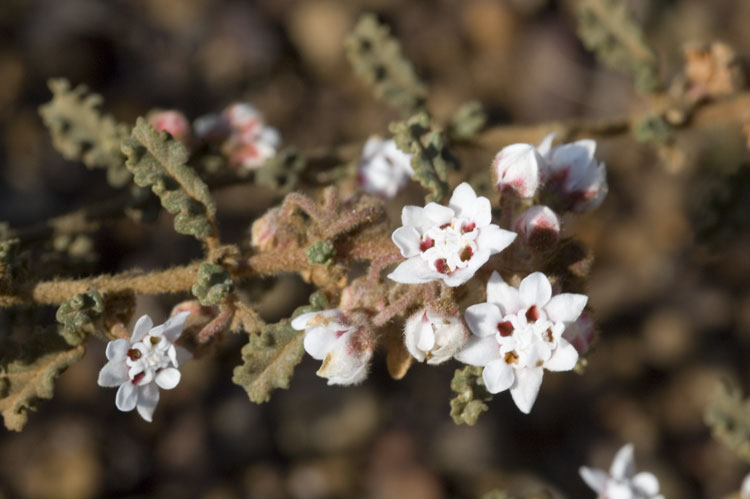
Flowers of Androcalva crispa
