= Antetezambaro =

- Location in Madagascar
- Coordinates: 17°03′00″S 49°24′00″E
- Country: Madagascar
- Region: Atsinanana
- District: Toamasina II
- Elevation: 12 m (39 ft)

Population (2019)Census
  - Total: 18,627
- Time zone: UTC3 (EAT)

Antetezambaro is a rural commune in the district of Toamasina II (district), in the region of Atsinanana, on the east coast of Madagascar. It is situated along the National road RN 5, 12 km north of Toamasina.
