= Antenina =

- Location in Madagascar
- Coordinates: 17°46′00″S 49°04′10″E
- Country: Madagascar
- Region: Atsinanana
- District: Toamasina II

Population (2019)Census
  - Total: 8,749
- Time zone: UTC3 (EAT)
- Postal code: 501

Antenina is a rural municipality in the district of Toamasina II (district), in the region of Atsinanana, on east coast of Madagascar.

This municipality has gained road access only in 2021. The unpaved road of 30 km to Miarinarivo, Toamasina was constructed by the villagers themselves.

== Economy ==
The economy is based on agriculture.
