= Amboditandroho =

- Location in Madagascar
- Coordinates: 19°11′40″S 49°00′45″E
- Country: Madagascar
- Region: Atsinanana
- District: Toamasina II
- Elevation: 15 m (49 ft)

Population (2019)Census
  - Total: 13,641
- Time zone: UTC3 (EAT)
- Postal code: 502

Amboditandroho is a rural commune in the district of Toamasina II (district), in the region of Atsinanana, on the east coast of Madagascar. It is situated at the National road RN 2 at 15 km from Toamasina.

== Economy ==
The economy is based on agriculture. Rice is grown, other crops are oil palms, manioc and sugar cane.

The palm grove of Savonnerie Tropicale is also situated in this municipality. In 2021 also the Brasseries Star moved to the commune.
