= Mangabe (disambiguation) =

Mangabe is a municipality in the Toamasina district, Atsinanana, Madagascar.

Mangabe may also refer to:

- Mangabe, Maevatanana, a municipality in Betsiboka
- Nosy Mangabe, an island in Analanjirofo
