= Amboasary, Atsinanana =

Amboasary
- Location in Madagascar
- Country: Madagascar
- Region: Atsinanana
- District: Marolambo District

Population (2019)census
  - Total: 8,288
  - Ethnicities: Betsimisaraka
- Time zone: UTC3 (EAT)
- Postal code: 513

Amboasary is a rural municipality located in the Marolambo District, Atsinanana region of eastern Madagascar. It borders West of the Marolambo National Park
