= Ampasimadinika =

- Location in Madagascar
- Coordinates: 18°28′00″S 49°08′00″E
- Country: Madagascar
- Region: Atsinanana
- District: Toamasina II

Population (2019)Census
  - Total: 4,890
- Time zone: UTC3 (EAT)

Ampasimadinika is a rural commune in the district of Toamasina II (district), in the region of Atsinanana, on the northern part of the east coast of Madagascar. It is situated along the National road RN 2.

== Economy ==
The economy is based on agriculture. Rice is grown, other crops are lychee, cloves and coffee.
