= Andranobolaha =

- Location in Madagascar
- Country: Madagascar
- Region: Atsinanana
- District: Toamasina II

Population (2019)
  - Total: 10,427
- Time zone: UTC3 (EAT)

Andranobolaha is a rural commune in the district of Toamasina II (district), in the region of Atsinanana, on the east coast of Madagascar.

== Economy ==
The economy is based on agriculture. Rice is grown, other crops include coffee.
