= Sahambala =

- Location in Madagascar
- Coordinates: 17°56′30″S 49°06′30″E
- Country: Madagascar
- Region: Atsinanana
- District: Toamasina II
- Elevation: 57 m (187 ft)

Population (2019)Census
  - Total: 15,850
- Time zone: UTC+03:00 (EAT)
- postal code: 502

Sahambala is a rural municipality in the district of Toamasina II (district), in the region of Atsinanana, on east coast of Madagascar.

== Economy ==
The economy is based on agriculture.
