= Fanandrana =

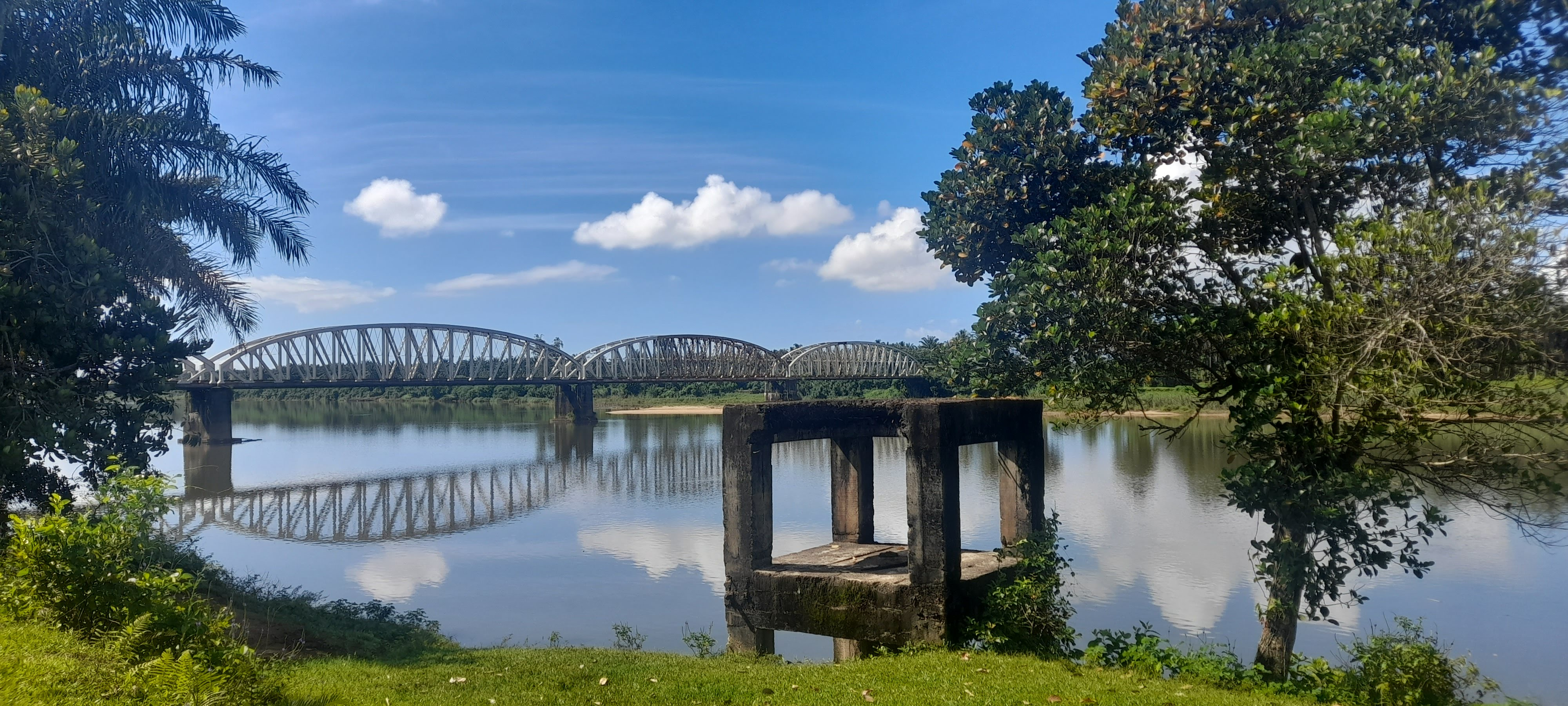
- Ivondro bridge at Fanandrana

- Location in Madagascar
- Coordinates: 18°11′40″S 49°22′45″E
- Country: Madagascar
- Region: Atsinanana
- District: Toamasina II

Area
  - Total: 292 km^{2} (113 sq mi)
- Elevation: 15 m (49 ft)

Population (2019)Census
  - Total: 17,644
- Time zone: UTC3 (EAT)
- Postal code: 501

Fanandrana is a rural commune in the district of Toamasina II (district), in the region of Atsinanana, on the east coast of Madagascar. It is situated at the National road RN 2 at 26 km from Toamasina. The Ivondro River flows through the center of Fanandrana, and the Fanandrana river in its south.

== Economy ==
The economy is based on agriculture. Rice is grown, other crops are oil palms, manioc, cloves, sugar cane and pepper.

In 2024 a prison of high security was inaugurated in Fanandrana, fokontany Antananambo.
