= Leioproctus flavimandibulatus =

Scientific classification
- Kingdom: Animalia
- Phylum: Arthropoda
- Clade: Pancrustacea
- Class: Insecta
- Order: Hymenoptera
- Family: Colletidae
- Genus: Leioproctus
- Species: L. flavimandibulatus

Binomial name
- Leioproctus flavimandibulatus Batley, 2025

Species of bee

Leioproctus flavimandibulatus, or Leioproctus (Euryglossidia) flavimandibulatus, is a species of bee in the family Colletidae and subfamily Colletinae. It is endemic to Australia. It was described by entomologist Michael Batley in 2025.

== Etymology ==
The specific epithet flavimandibulatus is an anatomical reference to the yellow mandible of the female.

== Description ==
The male body length is about 5.5 mm, female body length 6 mm. Integumental colouration is mainly black with the metasoma red-brown. The hair is white and brown.

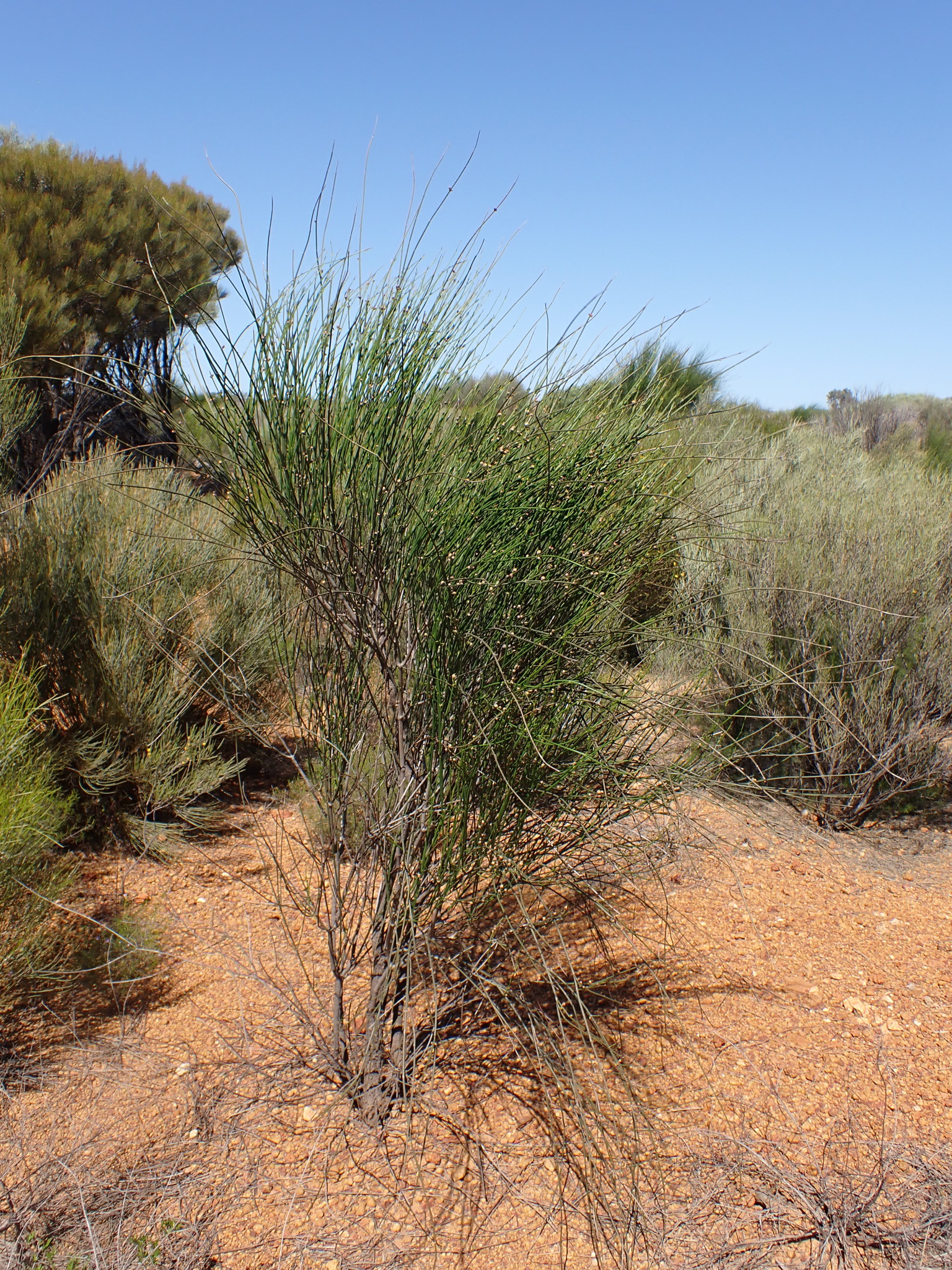
Calycopeplus paucifolius, a forage plant of the bees

== Distribution and habitat ==
The species occurs in south-west Western Australia. The type locality is Mount Gibson at the northern edge of the Wheatbelt.

== Behaviour ==
The adults are flying mellivores. Flowering plants visited by the bees include Calycopeplus paucifolius as well as Grevillea species.

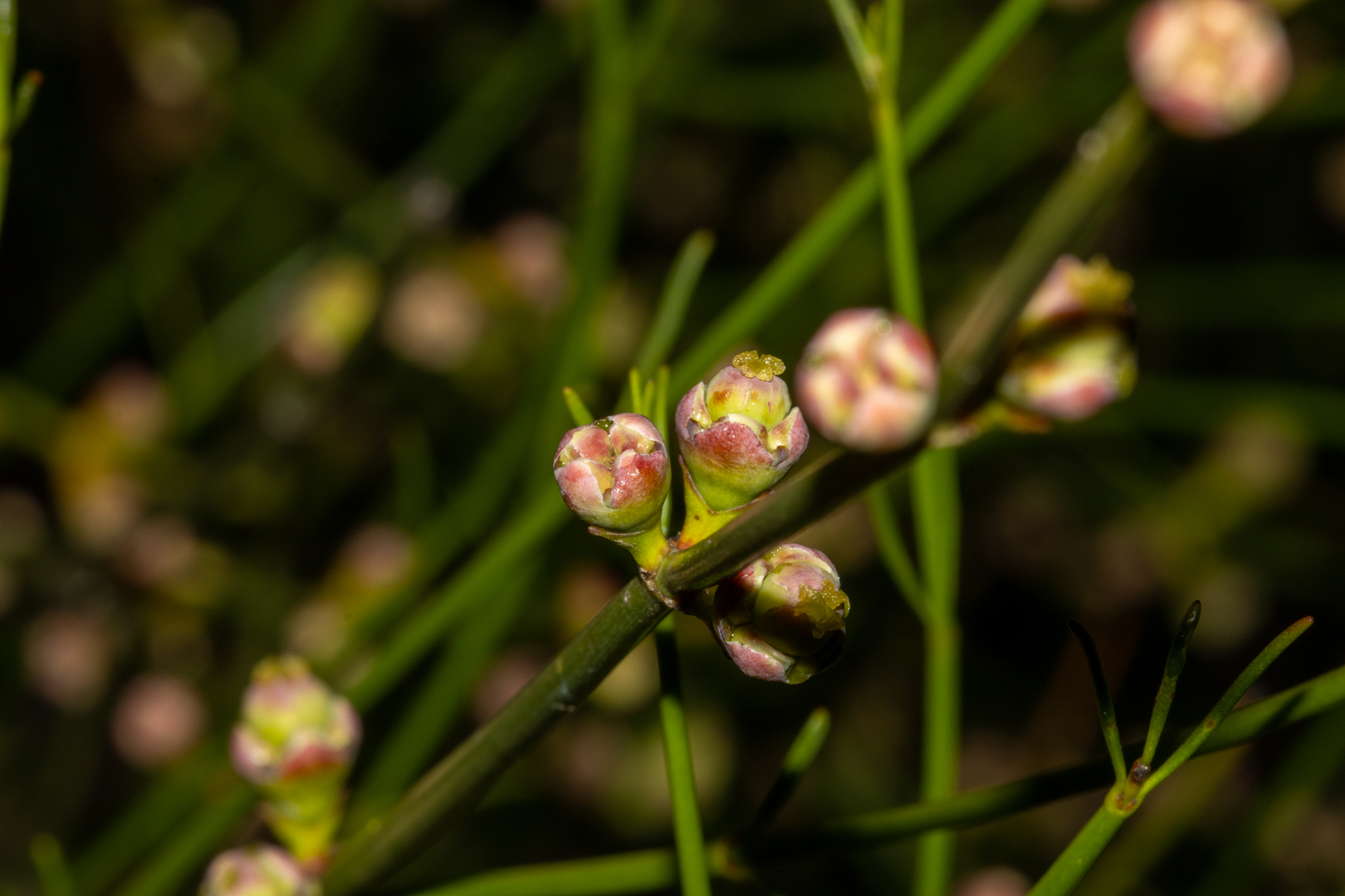
Flowers of Calycopeplus paucifolius
