= Toamasina suburbaine =

- Location in Madagascar
- Coordinates: 18°04′30″S 49°25′30″E
- Country: Madagascar
- Region: Atsinanana
- District: Toamasina II

Area
  - Total: 292 km^{2} (113 sq mi)
- Elevation: 15 m (49 ft)

Population (2019)Census
  - Total: 46,859
  - Ethnicities: Betsimisaraka
- Time zone: UTC3 (EAT)
- postal code: 502

Toamasina suburbaine is a municipality in the district of Toamasina II (district), in the region of Atsinanana, on east coast of Madagascar. It covers the rural villages in the surroundings of the city of Toamasina with 46,859 inhabitants (2019).

== Roads ==
Two national roads cross the territory of this municipality: the National road 5 north of Toamasina over 5 km and the National road 2 over 10km. Furthermore the Provincial road 7.
