= Onibe =

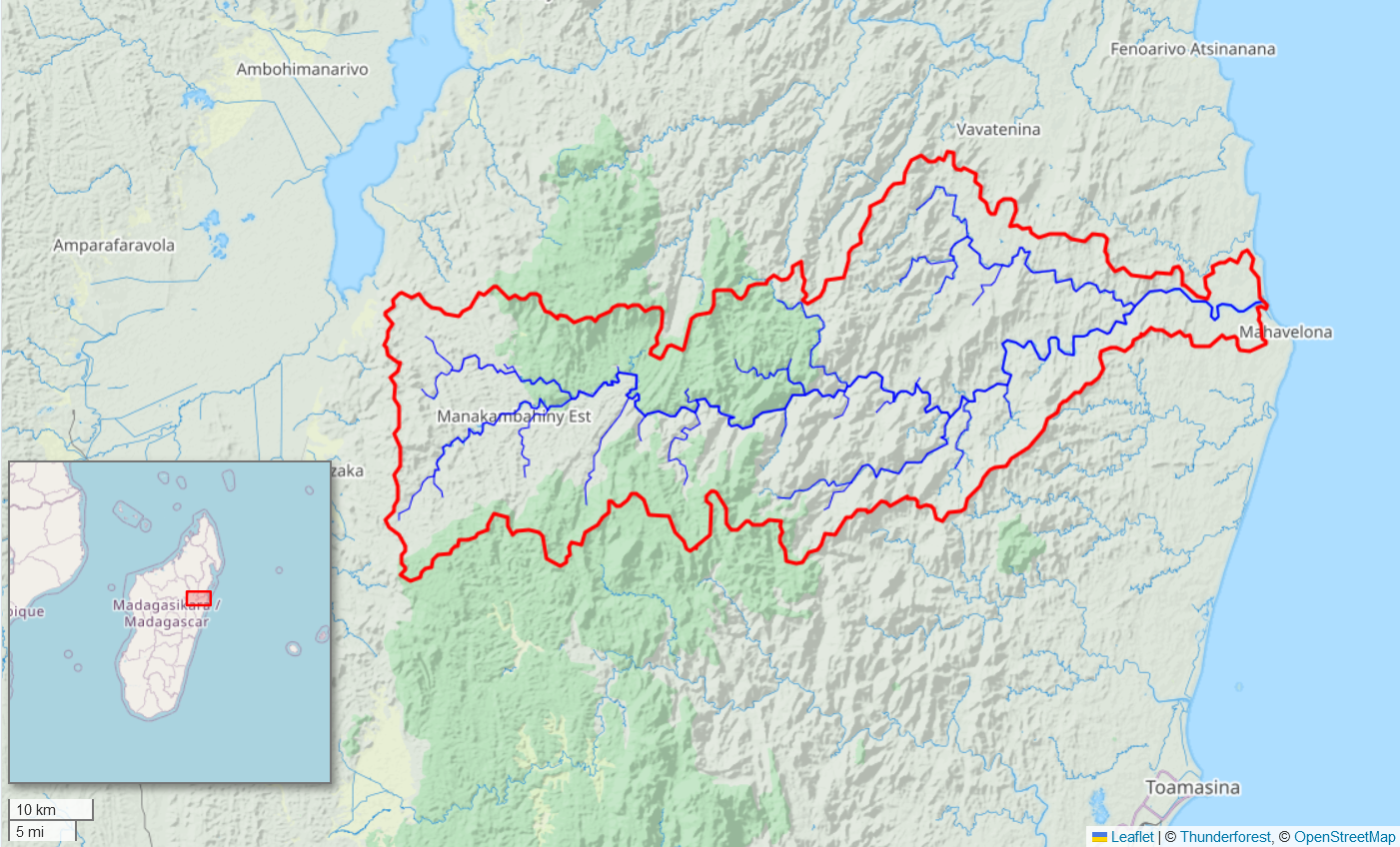
- Map of the Onibe River watershed

Location
- Country: Madagascar
- Region: Atsinanana

Physical characteristics
- Source
  - location: Atsinanana
  - elevation: 0 m (0 ft)
- Mouth: Indian Ocean
  - location: Mahavelona
  - coordinates: 17°38′00″S 49°29′00″E
  - elevation: 0 m (0 ft)
- Length: 0 km (0 mi)
- Basin size: 965 km^{2} (373 sq mi)

Onibe is a river in the east of Madagascar.

Its mouth is in the Indian Ocean at the city of Mahavelona (Foulpointe) in the region of Atsinanana.
