= Anthostema =

Scientific classification
- Kingdom: Plantae
- Clade: Tracheophytes
- Clade: Angiosperms
- Clade: Eudicots
- Clade: Rosids
- Order: Malpighiales
- Family: Euphorbiaceae
- Tribe: Euphorbieae
- Subtribe: Anthosteminae
- Genus: Anthostema; A.Juss.

Genus of plants

Anthostema is a flowering plant genus in the Family Euphorbiaceae (spurge family) first described as a genus in 1824. It is native to Africa and Madagascar.

Species

1. Anthostema aubryanum Baill. - W + C Africa from Ivory Coast to Cabinda
2. Anthostema madagascariense Baill. - Madagascar
3. Anthostema senegalense A.Juss. - W Africa from Senegal to Benin
