= Toamasina II District =

Toamasina II
- District
- Location in Madagascar
- Coordinates: 17°56′26″S 49°08′46″E
- Country: Madagascar

Area
  - Total: 1,935 sq mi (5,012 km^{2})

Population
  - Total: 276,478
  - Density: 142.9/sq mi (55.16/km^{2})

Toamasina II is a district of Atsinanana in Madagascar. It covers the outskirts of the city of Toamasina and the surrounding rural communes. The district has an area of 5,012 km^{2} (1,935 sq mi), and the estimated population in 2020 was 276,478.

== Communes ==
The district is further divided into 15 communes:

- Ambodilazana
- Ambodiriana
- Amboditandroho
- Ampasibe Onibe
- Ampasimadinika
- Andondabe
- Andranobolaha
- Antenina
- Antetezambaro
- Fanandrana
- Mahavelona (Foulpointe)
- Ifito
- Mangabe
- Sahambala
- Toamasina suburbaine

== Protected areas ==
- Part of the Ankeniheny-Zahamena Corridor, a natural resource reserve
- Analalava Special Reserve
- Betampona strict nature reserve
