= Dichostemma =

Scientific classification
- Kingdom: Plantae
- Clade: Tracheophytes
- Clade: Angiosperms
- Clade: Eudicots
- Clade: Rosids
- Order: Malpighiales
- Family: Euphorbiaceae
- Subfamily: Euphorbioideae
- Tribe: Euphorbieae
- Subtribe: Anthosteminae
- Genus: Dichostemma; Pierre

Genus of flowering plants

Dichostemma is a genus of flowering plants in the family Euphorbiaceae, first described as a genus in 1896. It is native to tropical western and central Africa.

Species

1. Dichostemma glaucescens Pierre - Nigeria, Cameroon, Gabon, Republic of the Congo, Central African Republic, Cabinda, Democratic Republic of the Congo
2. Dichostemma zenkeri Pax - Cameroon
