= Mangabe =

- Location in Madagascar
- Coordinates: 16°57′00″S 49°20′00″E
- Country: Madagascar
- Region: Atsinanana
- District: Toamasina II

Population (2019)Census
  - Total: 11,583
- Time zone: UTC3 (EAT)
- postal code: 502

Mangabe is a rural municipality in the district of Toamasina II (district), in the region of Atsinanana, on east coast of Madagascar.

== Economy ==
The economy is based on agriculture.
