= Neoguillauminia =

Conservation status
- Least Concern (IUCN 3.1)

Scientific classification
- Kingdom: Plantae
- Clade: Tracheophytes
- Clade: Angiosperms
- Clade: Eudicots
- Clade: Rosids
- Order: Malpighiales
- Family: Euphorbiaceae
- Subfamily: Euphorbioideae
- Tribe: Euphorbieae
- Subtribe: Neoguillauminiinae
- Genus: Neoguillauminia; Croizat
- Species: N. cleopatra

Binomial name
- Neoguillauminia cleopatra (Baill.) Croizat

Synonyms
- Cleopatra Pancher ex Croizat; Euphorbia cleopatra Baill.

Genus of flowering plants

Neoguillauminia is a genus of plants in the family Euphorbiaceae first described as a genus in 1938. It contains only one known species, Neoguillauminia cleopatra, endemic to New Caledonia. Its closest relative is Calycopeplus from Australia.

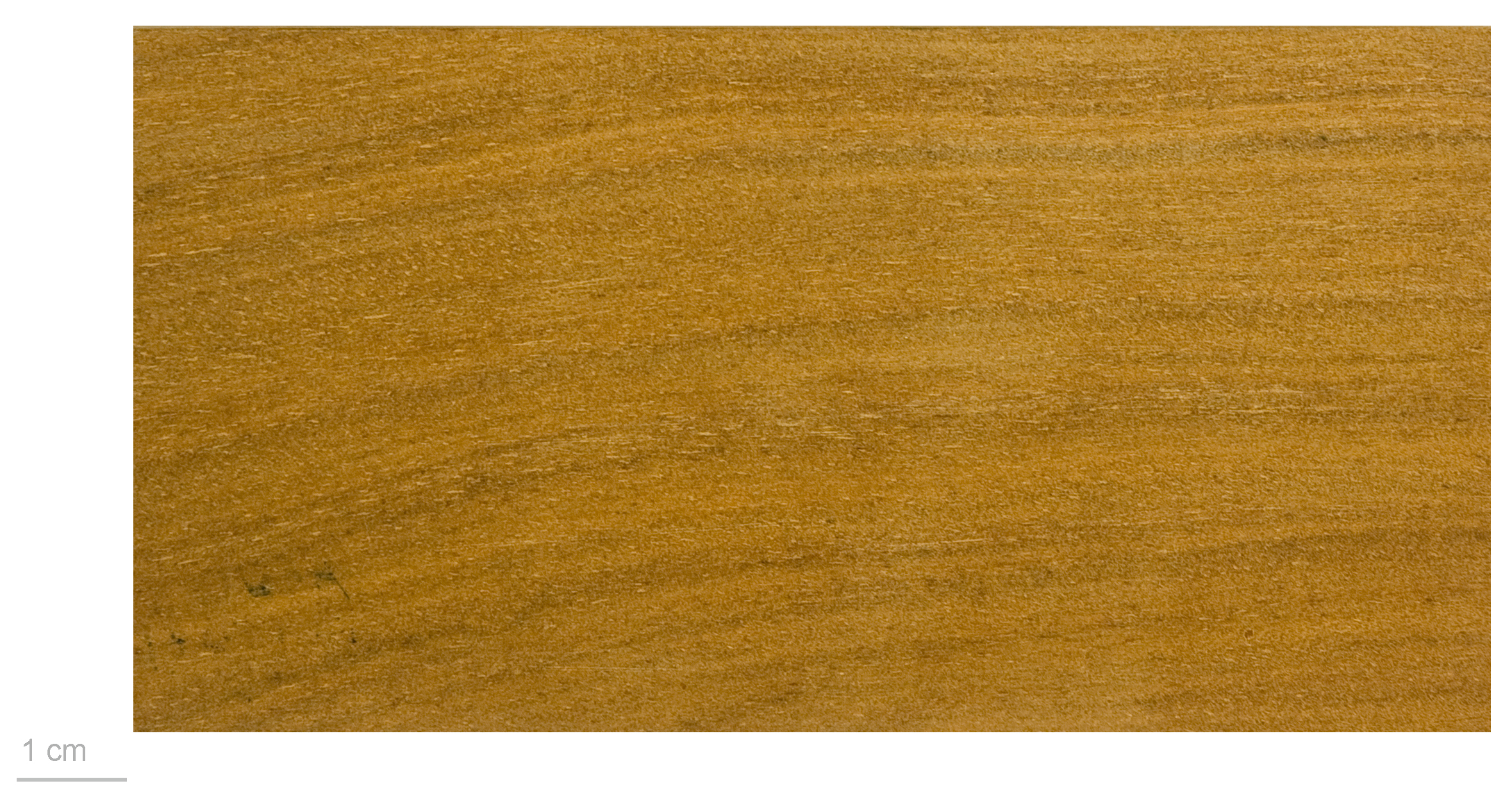
Neoguillauminia cleopatra - MHNT
