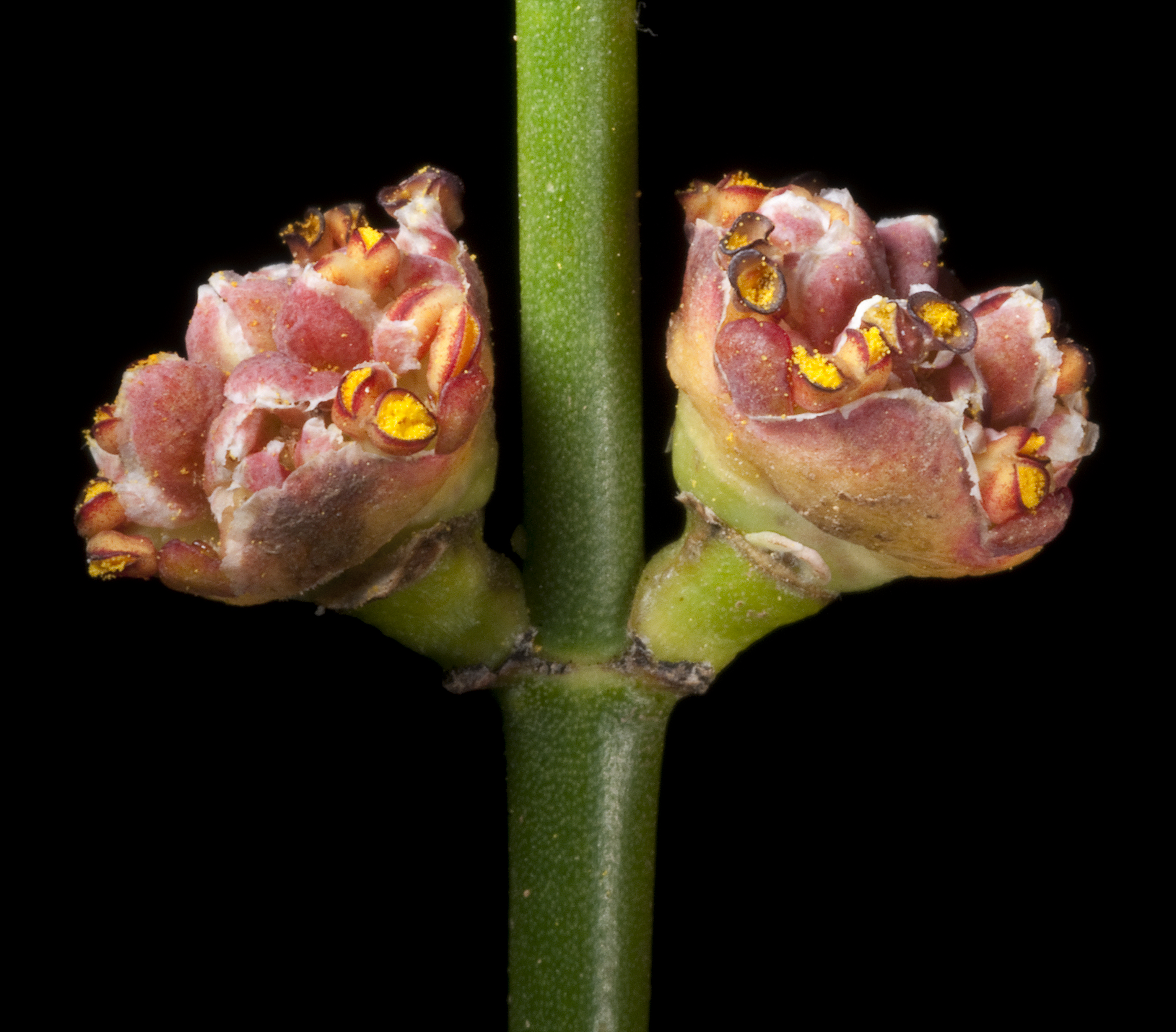
- Calycopeplus paucifolius

Scientific classification
- Kingdom: Plantae
- Clade: Tracheophytes
- Clade: Angiosperms
- Clade: Eudicots
- Clade: Rosids
- Order: Malpighiales
- Family: Euphorbiaceae
- Subfamily: Euphorbioideae
- Tribe: Euphorbieae
- Subtribe: Neoguillauminiinae
- Genus: Calycopeplus; Planch.

= Calycopeplus =

Genus of flowering plants

Calycopeplus is a plant genus of the family Euphorbiaceae first described by Jules Émile Planchon as a genus in 1861. The entire genus is endemic to Australia. Its closest relative is Neoguillauminia from New Caledonia.

The type species is Calycopeplus ephedroides, which is a synonym of Calycopeplus paucifolius.

Species

- Calycopeplus casuarinoides L.S.Sm. – Queensland
- Calycopeplus collinus P.I.Forst. – Northern Territory, Western Australia
- Calycopeplus marginatus Benth. – Western Australia
- Calycopeplus oligandrus P.I.Forst. – Western Australia
- Calycopeplus paucifolius (Klotzsch) Baill. – South Australia, Western Australia

== Description ==
The plants in this genus are monoecious, with the single sex flowers found in different parts of the same inflorescence. The female flowers are solitary and in the centre, while the male flowers are found in 4 clusters of 3–16 flowers within the involucre opposite the lobes. Each cluster is surrounded by bracts, with the outer one or two being enlarged and enclosing the cluster.
