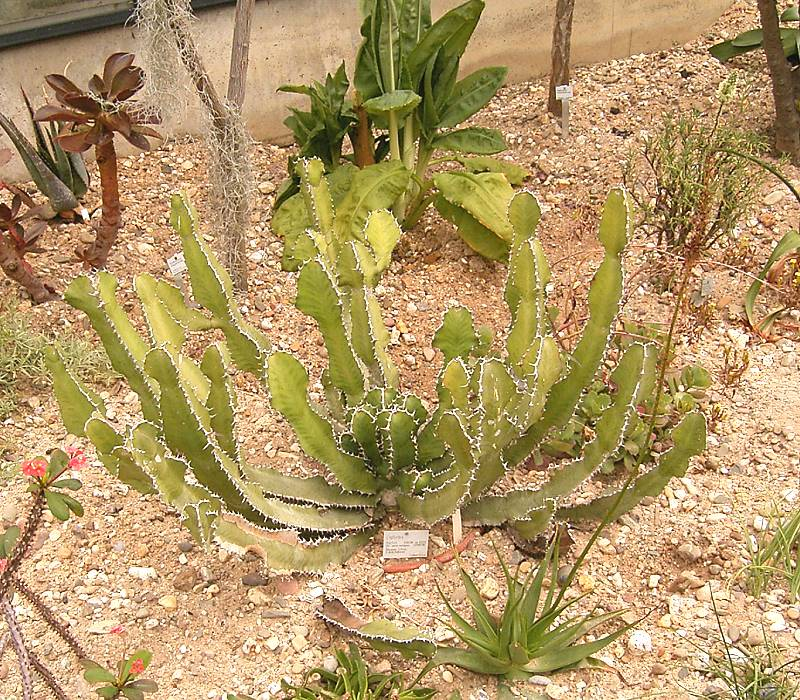
- Euphorbia cactus var. cactus

Scientific classification
- Kingdom: Plantae
- Clade: Tracheophytes
- Clade: Angiosperms
- Clade: Eudicots
- Clade: Rosids
- Order: Malpighiales
- Family: Euphorbiaceae
- Subfamily: Euphorbioideae
- Tribe: Euphorbieae

Subtribes
- Anthosteminae; Euphorbiinae; Neoguillauminiinae

= Euphorbieae =

Tribe of flowering plants

Euphorbieae is a tribe of flowering plants of the family Euphorbiaceae. It comprises three subtribes and five genera. The three subtribes are Euphorbiinae, Neoguillauminiinae and Anthosteminae.

Euphorbieae have many different species of plants including some in the tropic and nontropical areas of the world. Thanks to convergent evolution, these columnar, ribbed flowering plants appear to resemble cacti, although they have different forms and flowers to tell them apart; e.i. a cactus would have spines (leaf tissue) with a rose-like flower, whereas a euphorbieae would have a very basic, 3 petal shape with thorns (stem tissue). Euphorbieae (commonly called Euphorbia) has a sap inside of it - that when it breaks or is cut - comes out of it, and tends to irritate the skin.

Euphorbieae were thought to be a bisexual flower, however, research has shown that there are many male flowers surround one female flower.

== Genera ==
- Subtribe Anthosteminae
  - Anthostema A.Juss.
  - Dichostemma Pierre
- Subtribe Euphorbiinae
  - Euphorbia L.
- Subtribe Neoguillauminiinae
  - Calycopeplus Planch.
  - Neoguillauminia Croizat

== See also ==
- Taxonomy of the Euphorbiaceae
