= Ambalona River =

Location
- Country: Madagascar
- Region: Atsinanana

Physical characteristics
- Mouth
  - location: Atsinanana

Ambalona is a river in eastern Madagascar. It flows into the Indian Ocean south of Toamasina.

== See also ==
- List of rivers of Madagascar
