= Leioproctus brochus =

Scientific classification
- Kingdom: Animalia
- Phylum: Arthropoda
- Clade: Pancrustacea
- Class: Insecta
- Order: Hymenoptera
- Family: Colletidae
- Genus: Leioproctus
- Species: L. brochus

Binomial name
- Leioproctus brochus Batley, 2025

Species of bee

Leioproctus brochus, or Leioproctus (Euryglossidia) brochus, is a species of bee in the family Colletidae and subfamily Colletinae. It is endemic to Australia. It was described by entomologist Michael Batley in 2025.

== Etymology ==
The specific epithet brochus (Latin: "projecting") is an anatomical reference to the rectangular tooth on the male clypeus.

== Description ==
The holotype male body length is about 5.1 mm, female body length about 5.1 mm. Integumental colouration is mainly black, with the metasoma brown. The hair is mostly white.

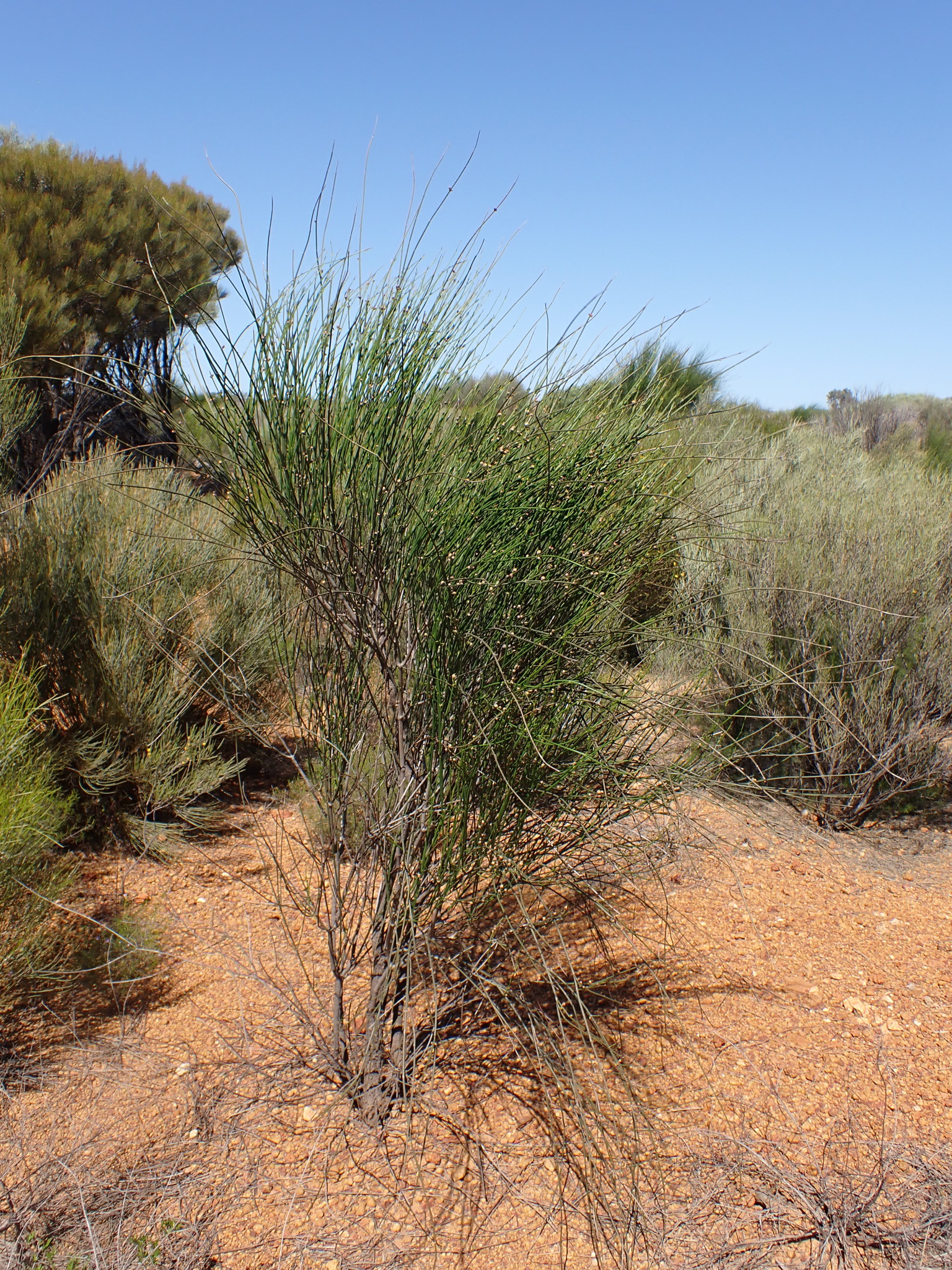
Calycopeplus paucifolius, a forage plant of the bees

== Distribution and habitat ==
The species occurs in south-west Western Australia. The type locality is Lochada, some 12 km east of Morawa.

== Behaviour ==
The adults are flying mellivores. Flowering plants visited by the bees include Calycopeplus paucifolius.

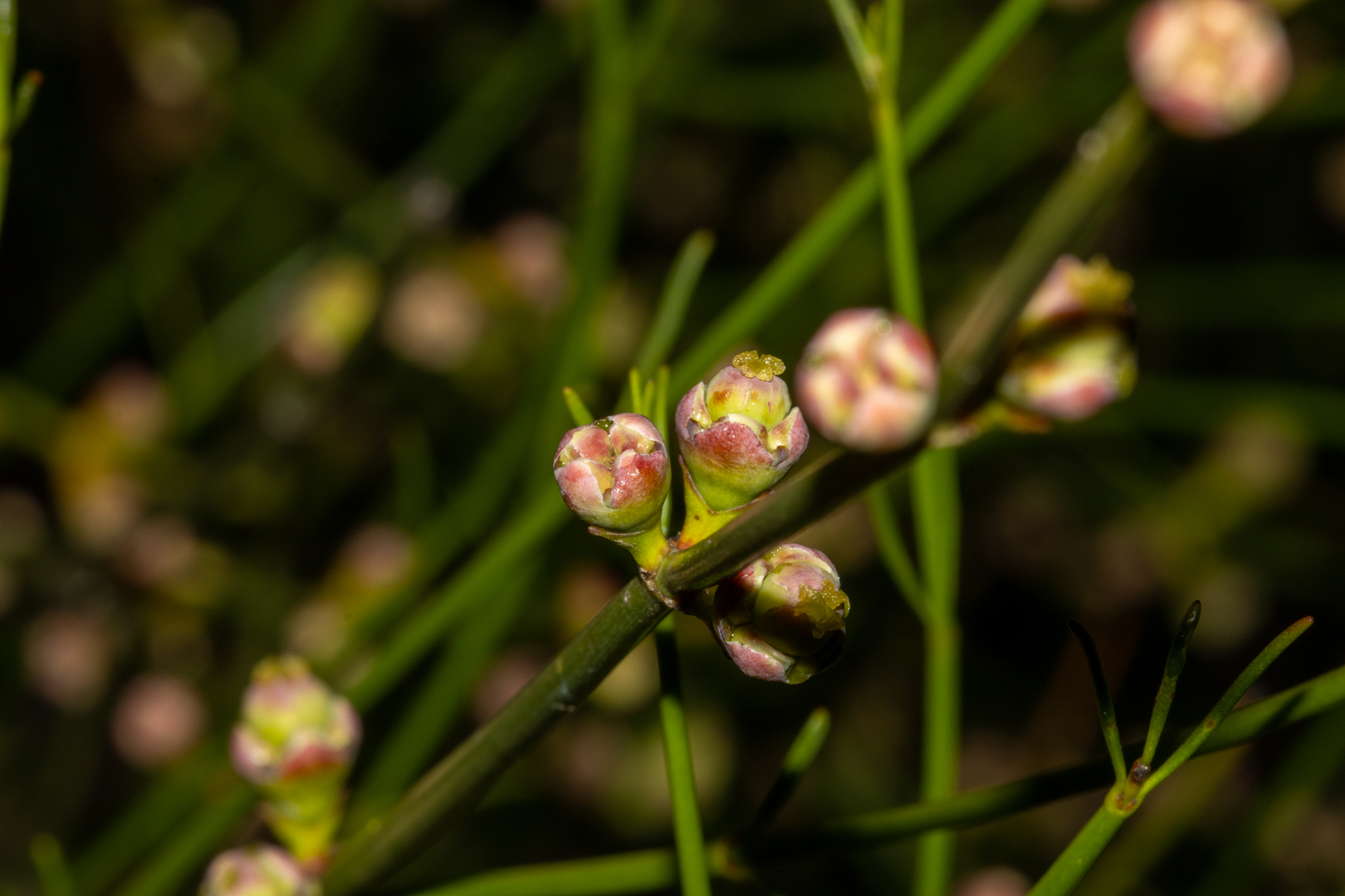
Flowers of Calycopeplus paucifolius
