= Anthostema madagascariense =

Scientific classification
- Kingdom: Plantae
- Clade: Tracheophytes
- Clade: Angiosperms
- Clade: Eudicots
- Clade: Rosids
- Order: Malpighiales
- Family: Euphorbiaceae
- Genus: Anthostema
- Species: A. madagascariense

Binomial name
- Anthostema madagascariense Baill.

Species of plant

Anthostema madagascariense is a species of flowering plant in the family Euphorbiaceae (spurge family). It is a small to medium-sized tree or large bush, endemic to Madagascar, the Comoro Islands and Mayotte.

== Description ==
Anthostema madagascariense is an evergreen tree, rich in latex in all its parts, which grows to a height of about 30 m (100 ft). The trunk is cylindrical and straight, and up to 70 cm (28 in) in diameter; the lower half is usually devoid of branches. The bark is dark red or blackish, and deeply fissured. The leaves are alternate. The leaf blades are leathery, obovate or elliptical, with entire margins, and are borne on short, grooved petioles. They measure up to 13 by 5 cm (5 by 2 in) and have wedge-shaped bases and either tapering or blunt apexes. The inflorescence is a cyme growing in the axil of a leaf. The individual flowers are either male or female. The female flower has a three or four-lobed perianth and a spreading style, and is surrounded by several male flowers, each with a three or four-toothed perianth, and a single stamen. The fruits are three-lobed capsules about 2 cm (0.8 in) in diameter, green at first but turning brown as they become dry and split open to reveal the three oval, flattened, brown seeds.

== Distribution and habitat ==
This tree grows naturally on the Comoro Islands, Mayotte and eastern Madagascar. It grows in tropical rainforest, including swamp forest, at altitudes of up to about 1,700 m (5,600 ft), being locally common below about 500 m (1,600 ft).

== Uses ==
The timber of Anthostema madagascariense is whitish when freshly cut, turning pink on exposure to the air. It is soft and non-durable, prone to rot and attack by insects, and is little used for construction, but can be worked by hand to make utensils. It may be used in light carpentry, to make boxes or for veneering. It is often a constituent of fibreboard and hardboard, and the latex is used as an adhesive.
