= Mahavelona =

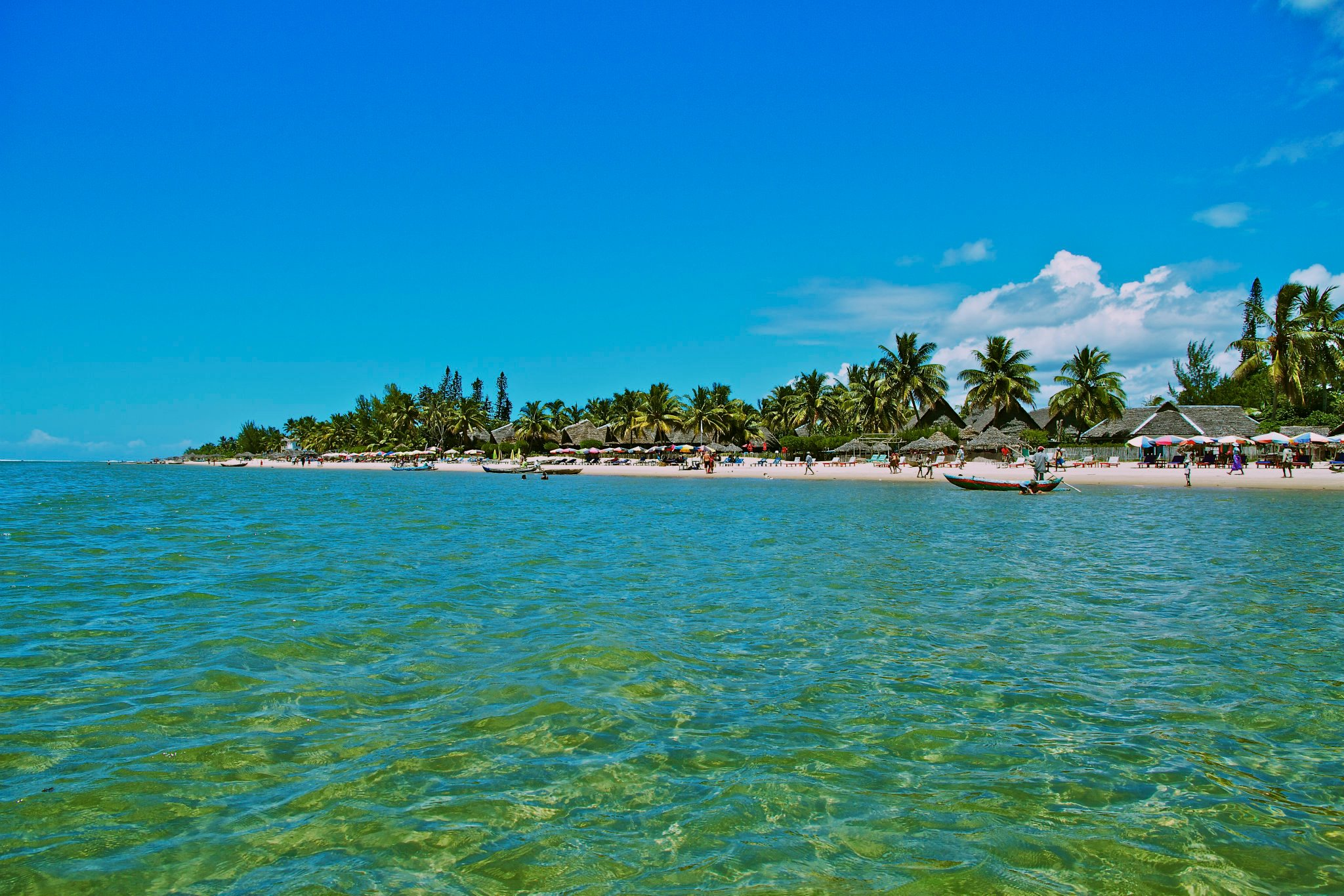
- Foulpointe
- Nickname: Foulpointe
- Location in Madagascar
- Coordinates: 17°41′10″S 49°31′6″E
- Country: Madagascar
- Region: Atsinanana
- District: Toamasina II

Government
  - Mayor: Tody Andriamaharo Lalatiana Jaona

Area
  - Total: 400 km^{2} (150 sq mi)
- Elevation: 9 m (30 ft)

Population (2002)
  - Total: 13 031
- Time zone: UTC4 (EAT)
- Postal code: 502

Mahavelona (commonly called Foulpointe), is a town in the district of Toamasina II, in the region of Atsinanana, on the northern part of the east coast of Madagascar.

== Geography ==
It is situated at the coast of the Indian Ocean south of the mouth of the Onibe River. The town is located at 60 km north of Toamasina on the RN 5 between Toamasina and Maroantsetra. There is a reef around 150 metres out to sea which prevents waves hitting the beach; the waters by the shoreline are completely calm as a result.

=== Rivers ===
The Onibe river has its mouth at Foulpointe.

== Economy ==
Its economy is based on tourism.

== Administration ==
Eleven Fokontany (villages) are part of this municipality : Foulpointe, Saranaina, Antenina, Vohitamboro, Antaratasy, Marofarihy, Bongabe, Ambohimarina, Morarano, Ambohimanarivo and Ambodivoarabe.

== International relations ==
Foulpointe is twinned with:

- Entre-Deux, Réunion (France).
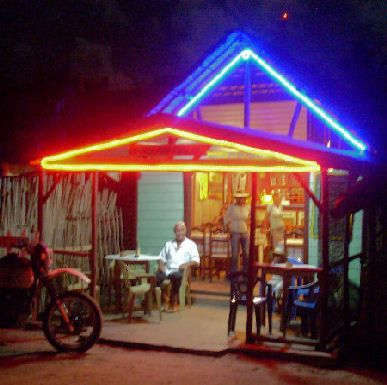
Nightlife

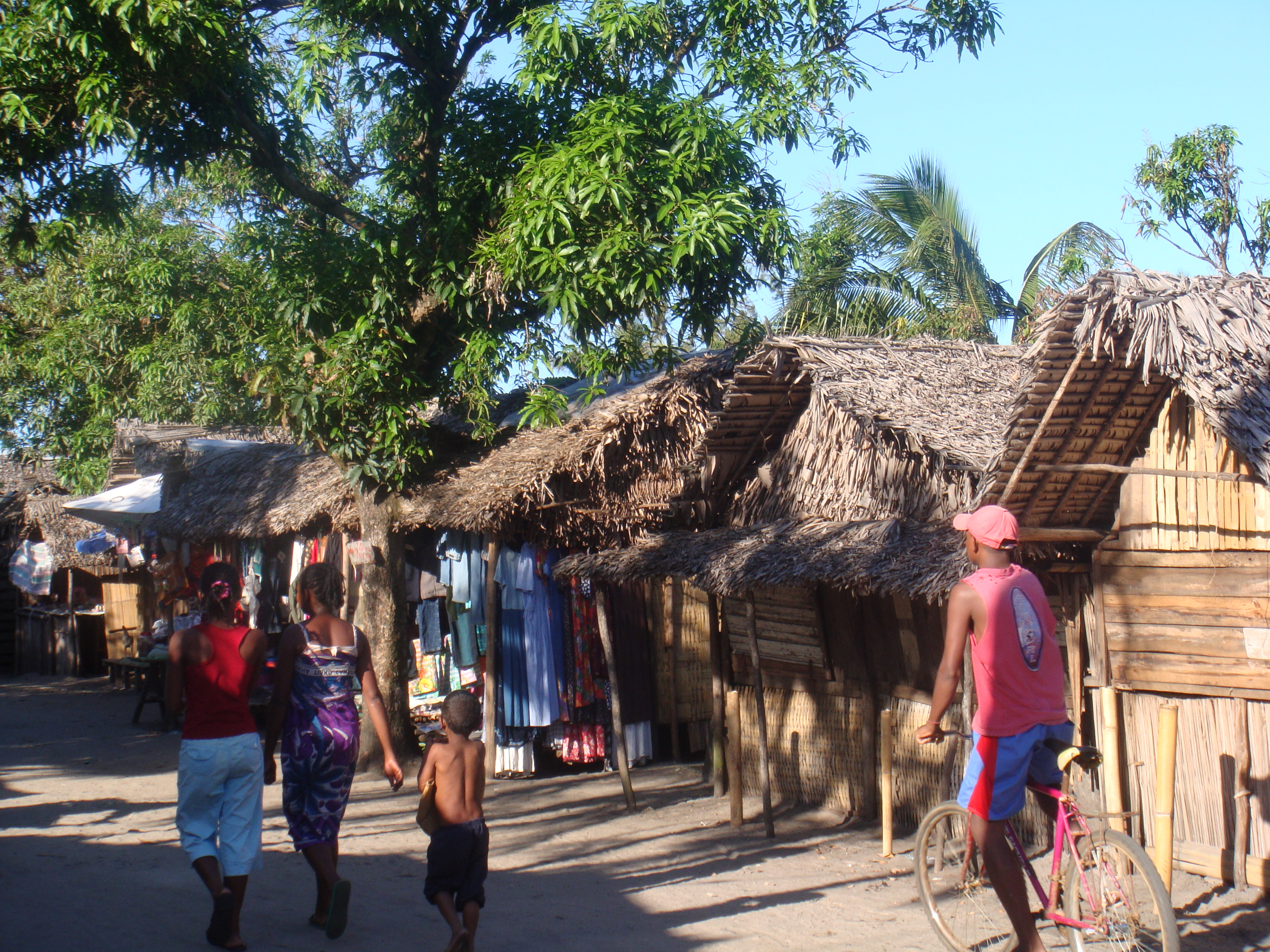
Main road

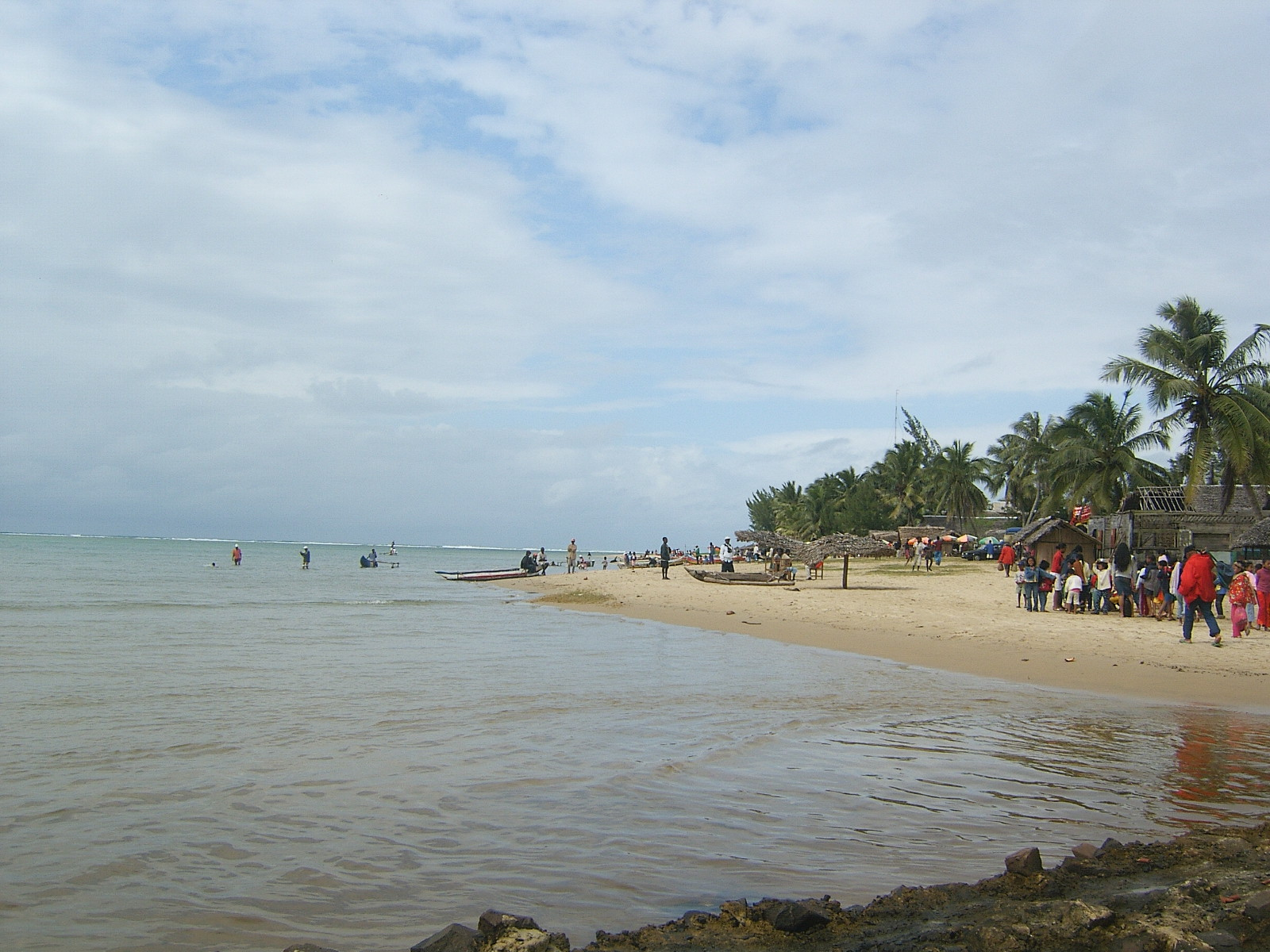
View of beach

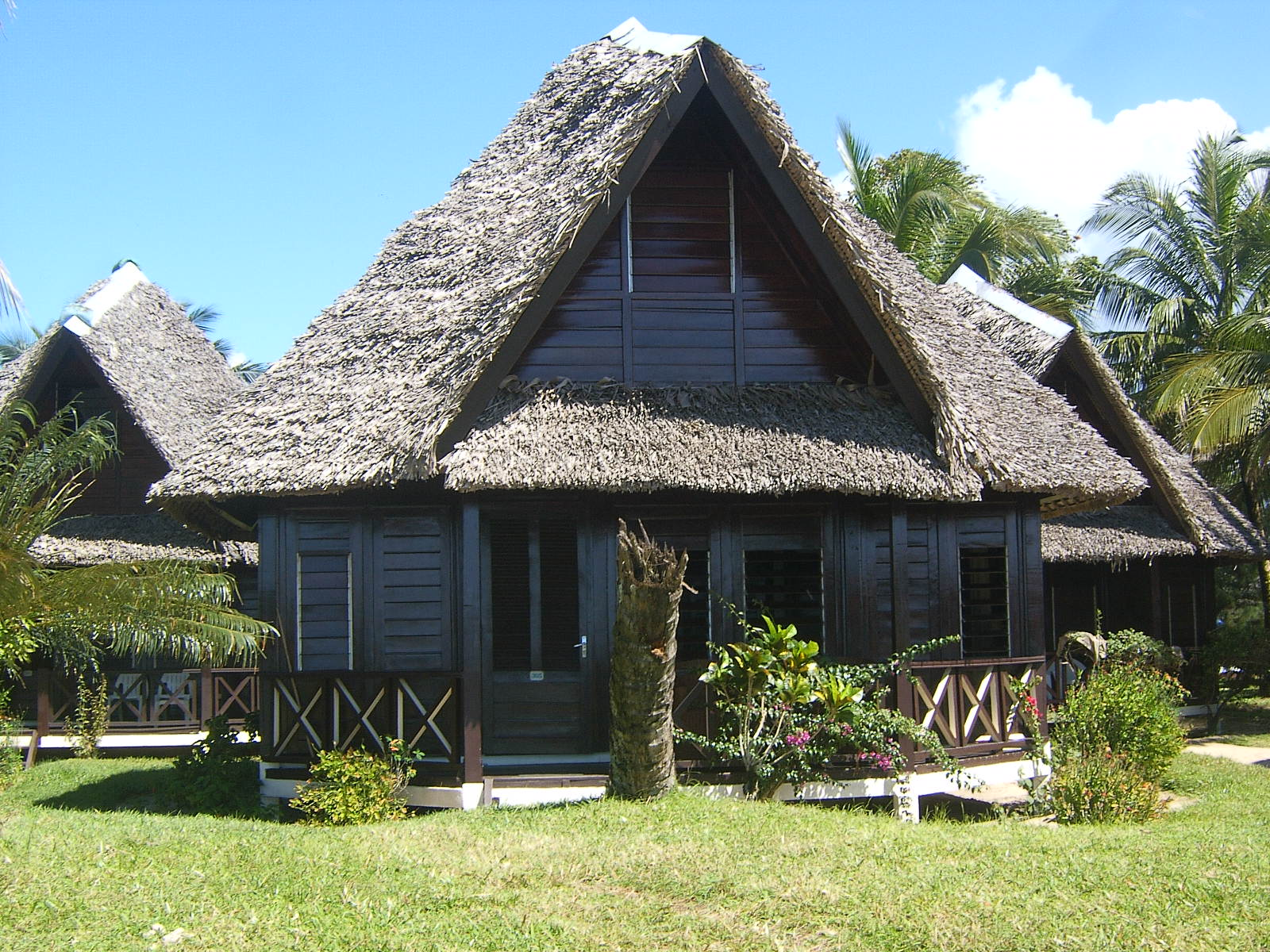
Bungalow at Manda beach

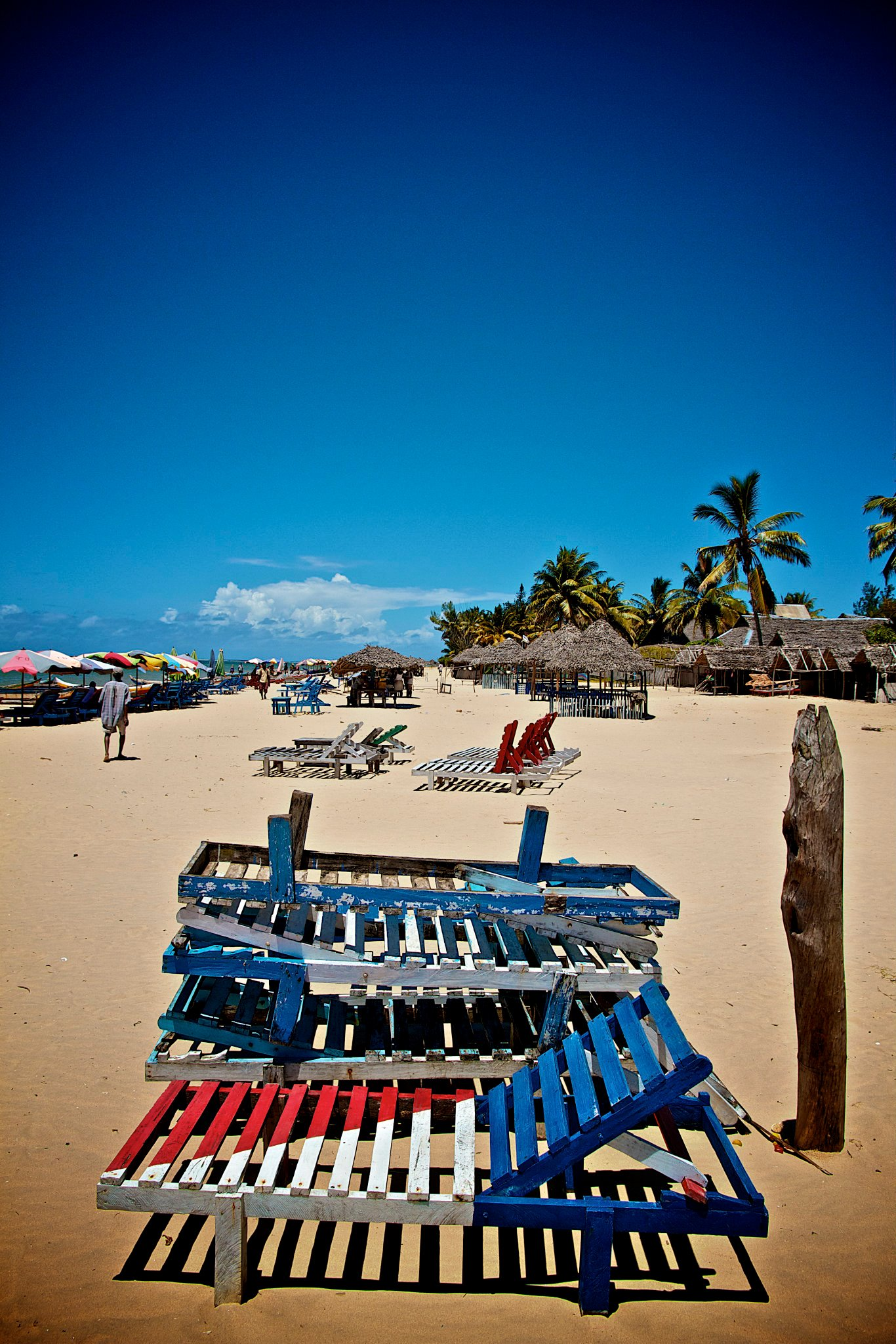
Beach of Foulpointe

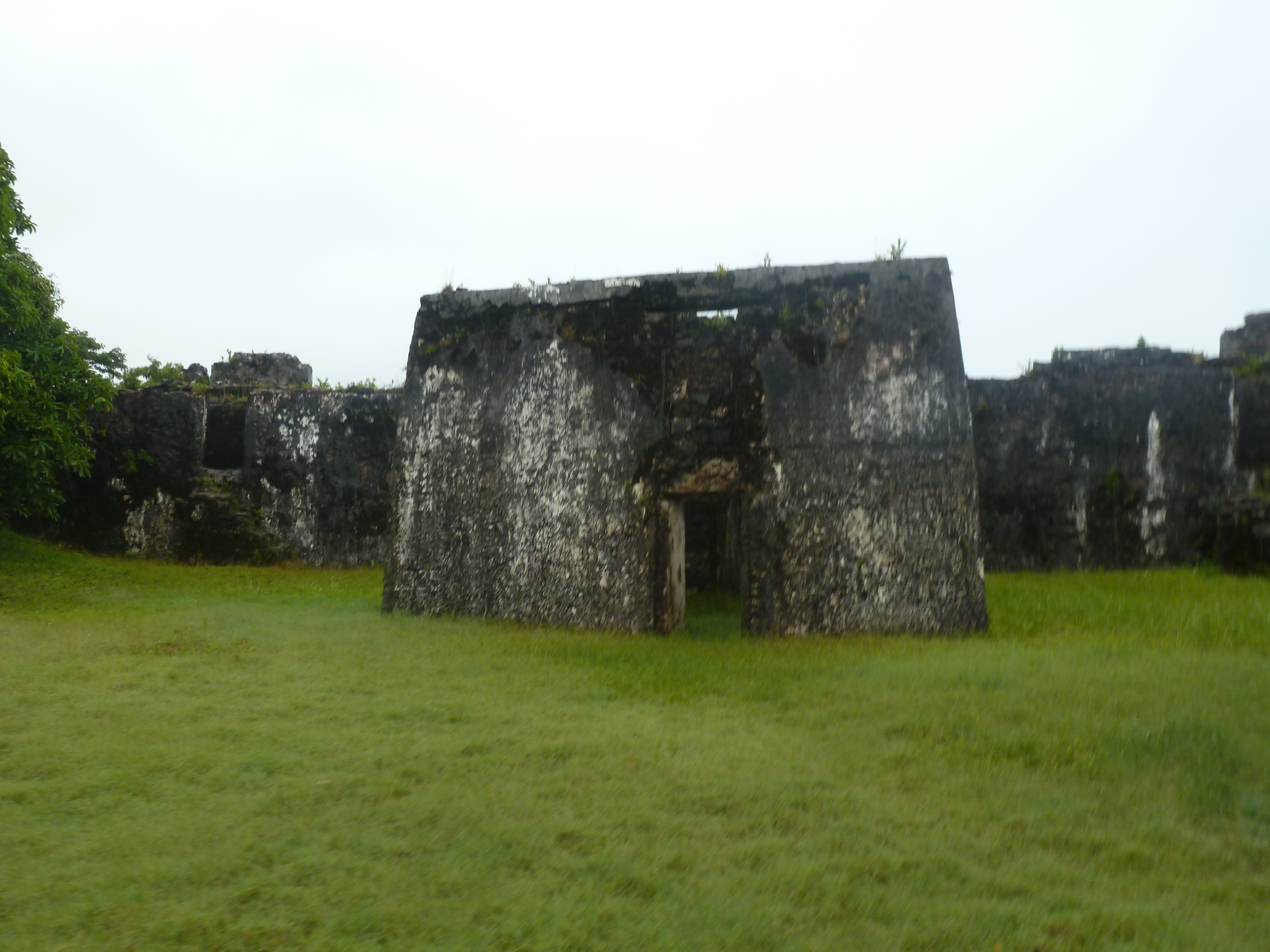
Manda Fort

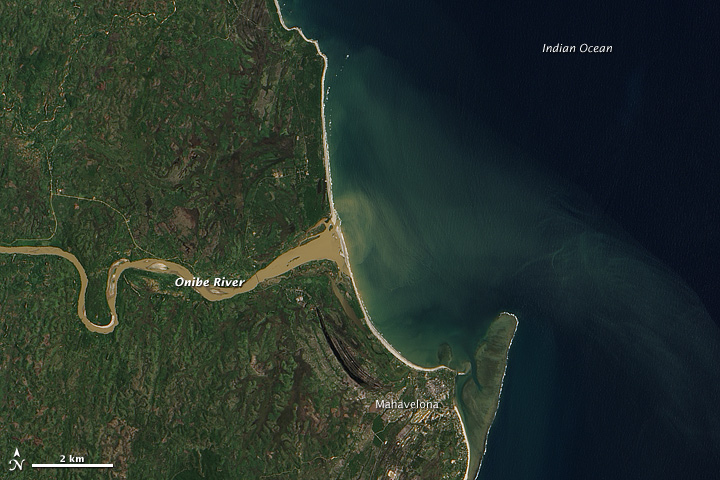
Satellite image
