= Amboasary Nord =

- Town
- Location within Madagascar
- Coordinates: 18°07′30″S 47°47′38″E
- Country: Madagascar
- Region: Analamanga
- District: Anjozorobe
- Elevation: 1,135 m (3,724 ft)

Population (2019)
  - Total: 8,255
- Time zone: UTC+3 (EAT)
- postal code: 107

Amboasary Nord is a rural village in the Analamanga Region, Madagascar, in the district of Anjozorobe.

It has a population of 8,255 inhabitants in 2019. Since 2016 the installation of a small water powered plant permits the supply of electricity to some 500 households. It is connected to Amparatanjona by an unpaved piste of 4.5 km.
