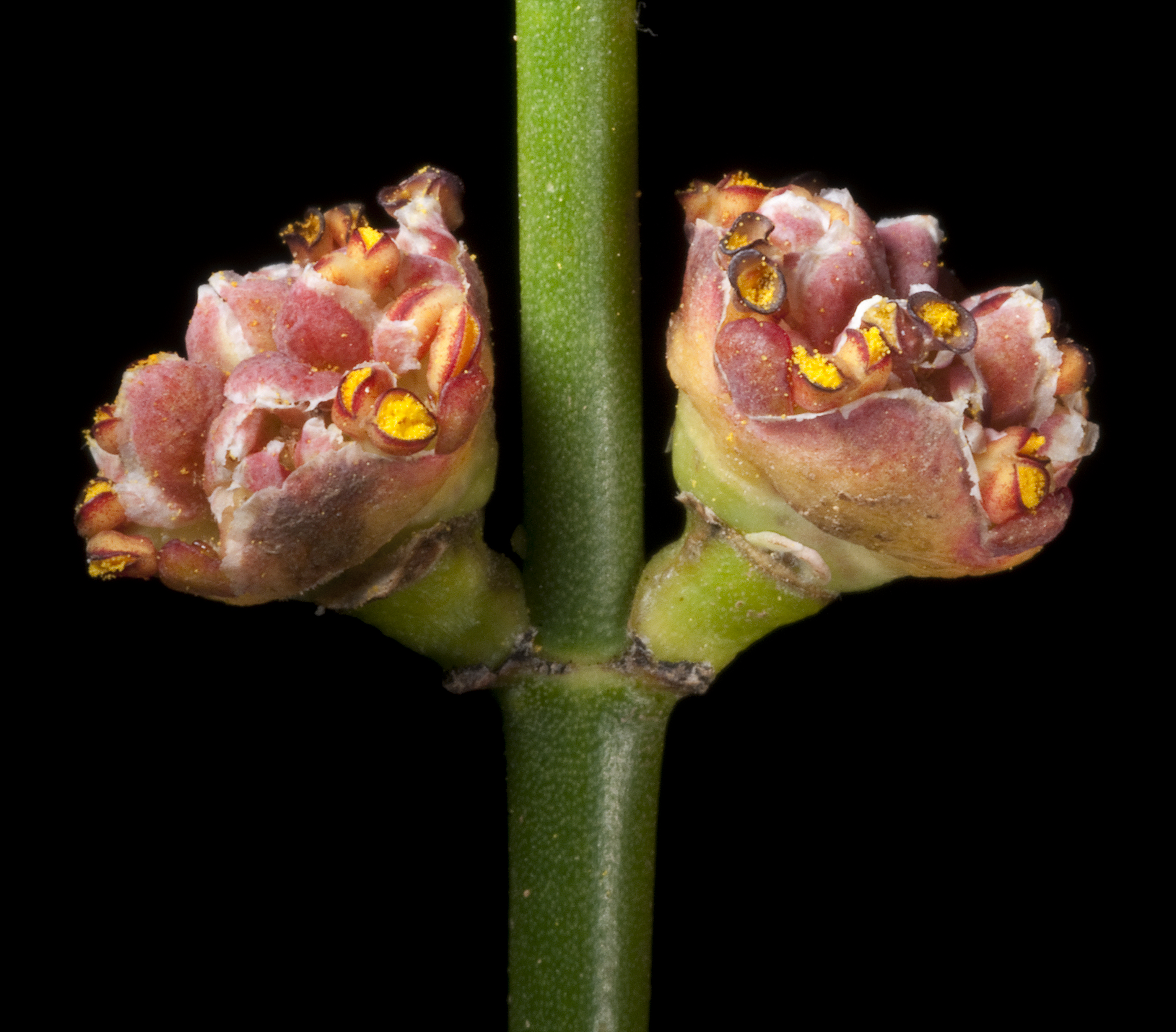

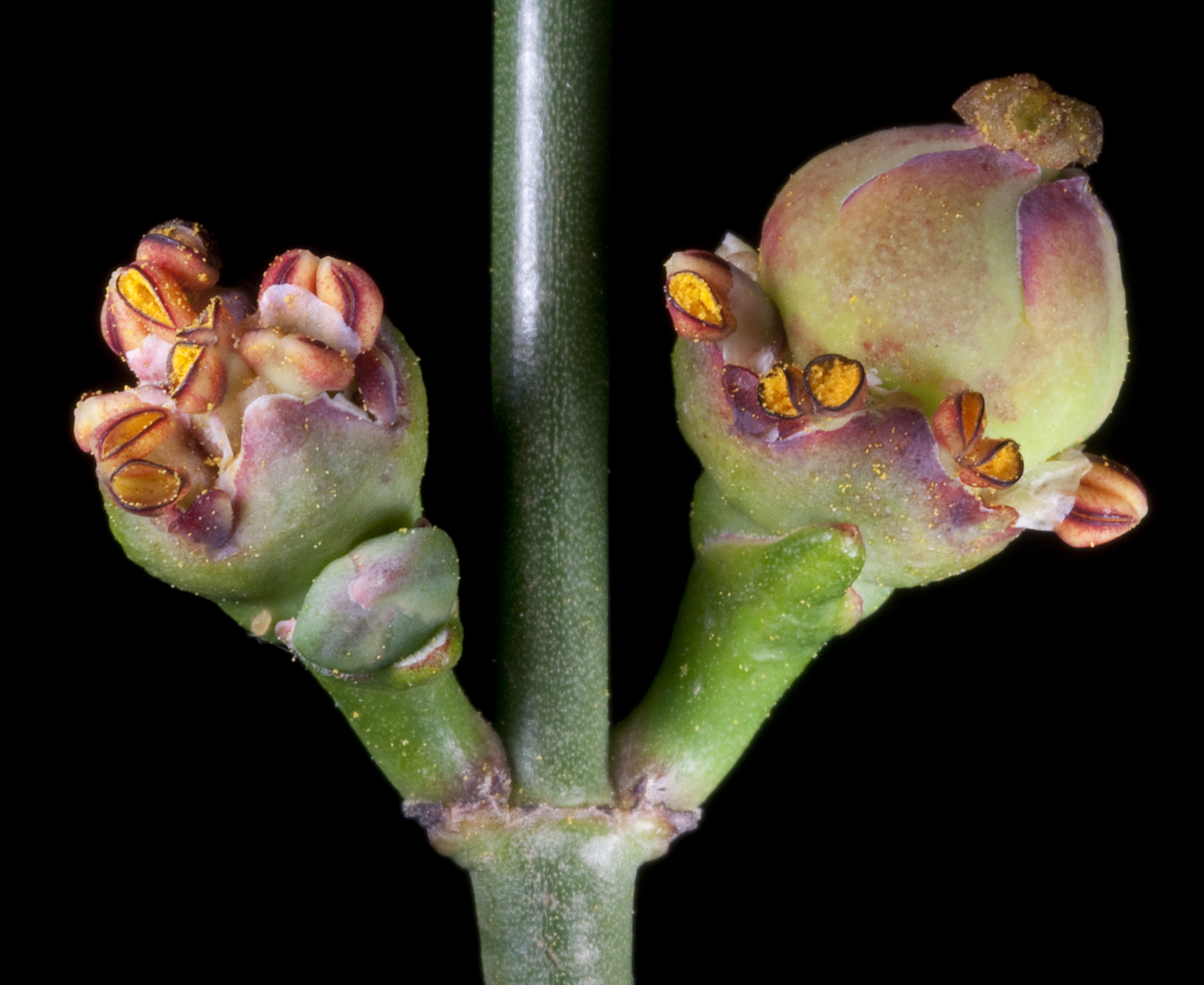

Scientific classification
- Kingdom: Plantae
- Clade: Tracheophytes
- Clade: Angiosperms
- Clade: Eudicots
- Clade: Rosids
- Order: Malpighiales
- Family: Euphorbiaceae
- Genus: Calycopeplus
- Species: C. paucifolius

Binomial name
- Calycopeplus paucifolius (Klotzsch) Baill.

Synonyms
- Ephedra arborea F.Muell. Calycopeplus ephedroides Planch. Calycopeplus helmsii F.Muell. & Tate; Euphorbia paucifolia Klotzsch

= Calycopeplus paucifolius =

Species of flowering plant

Calycopeplus paucifolius is an erect shrub species in the family Euphorbiaceae. It is found in South Australia & Western Australia.

Calycopeplus paucifolius is a broom-like shrub, growing from 60 cm to 5 m high. Its flowers are green-white, and seen from September to December on hillslopes and granite outcrops, growing on stony loams, sands and sandy clays.

The species was first described as Euphorbia paucifolia in 1845 by Johann Friedrich Klotzsch, but was transferred to the genus, Calycopeplus, by Henri Ernest Baillon in 1866.
