= Ivondro River =

River in Madagascar

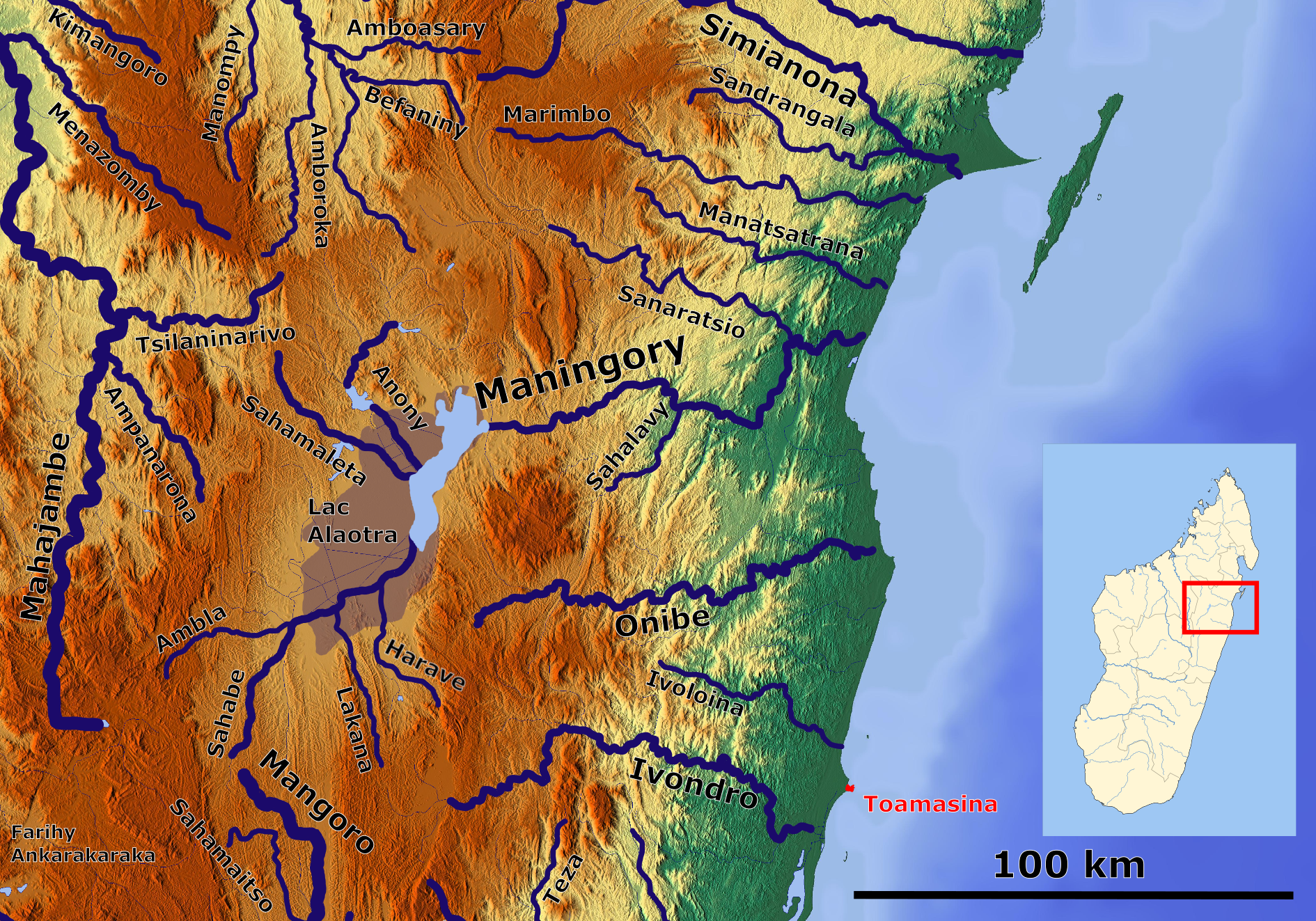
- Ivondro River

- Map of Malagasy rivers.

Location
- Country: Madagascar
- Region: Alaotra-Mangoro, Atsinanana

Physical characteristics
- Source
  - elevation: 1,200 m (3,900 ft)
- Mouth: Indian Ocean
  - location: south of Toamasina
  - elevation: 0 m (0 ft)
- Length: 150 km (93 mi)
- Basin size: 3,300 km^{2} (1,300 mi^{2}) to 3,884.5 km^{2} (1,499.8 mi^{2})
- Discharge
  - location: Near mouth
  - average: (Period: 1971–2000)233.7 m^{3}/s (8,250 cu ft/s)

The Ivondro River in Alaotra-Mangoro and Atsinanana regions, is located in central-eastern Madagascar. It drains to the eastern coast. It flows into the Canal des Pangalanes and the Indian Ocean south of Toamasina.

A hydro-power station will be built near Volobe.

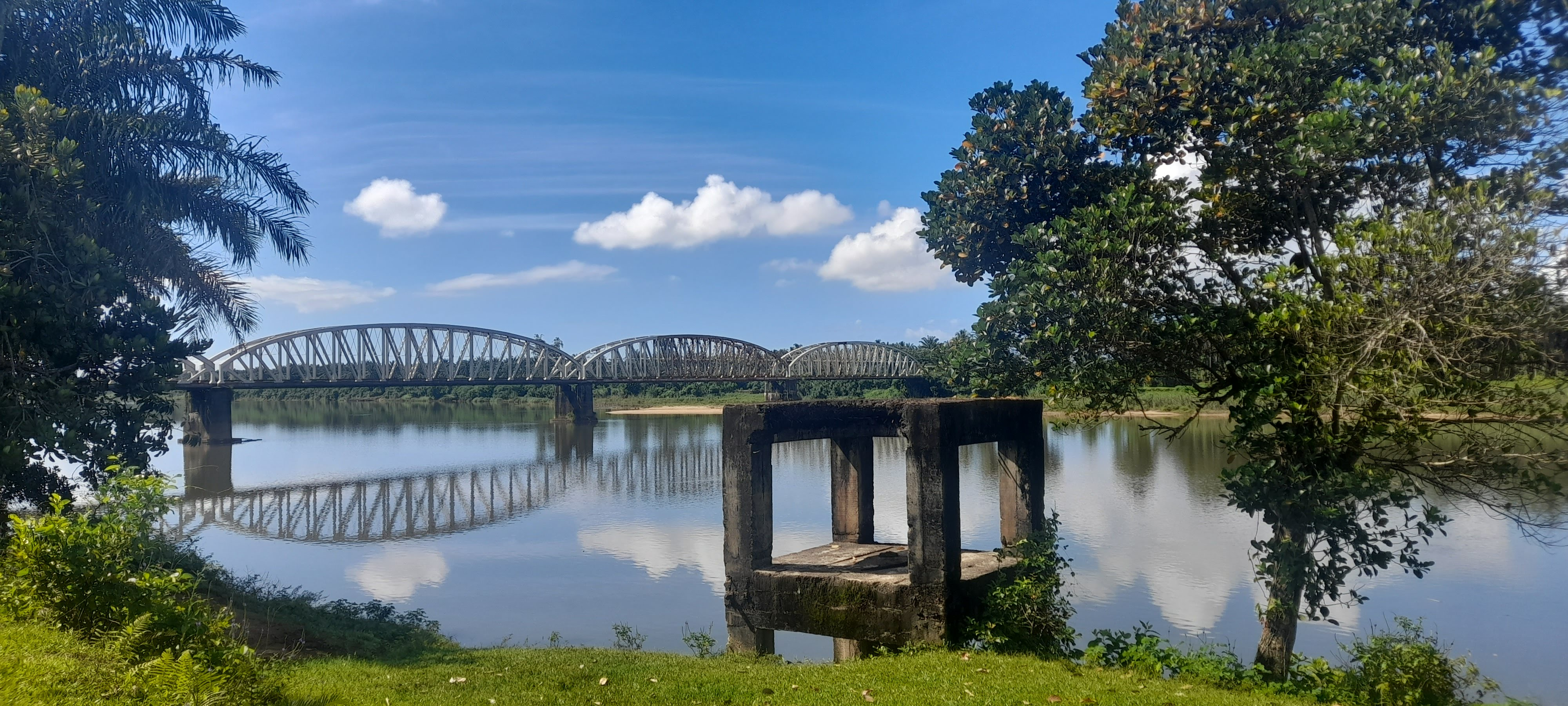
Bridge of RN 2 over the Ivondro

The National Road 2 crosses this river near Fanandrana, Toamasina.
