= Betampona Reserve =

Nature reserve in Madagascar

- IUCN category Ia (strict nature reserve)
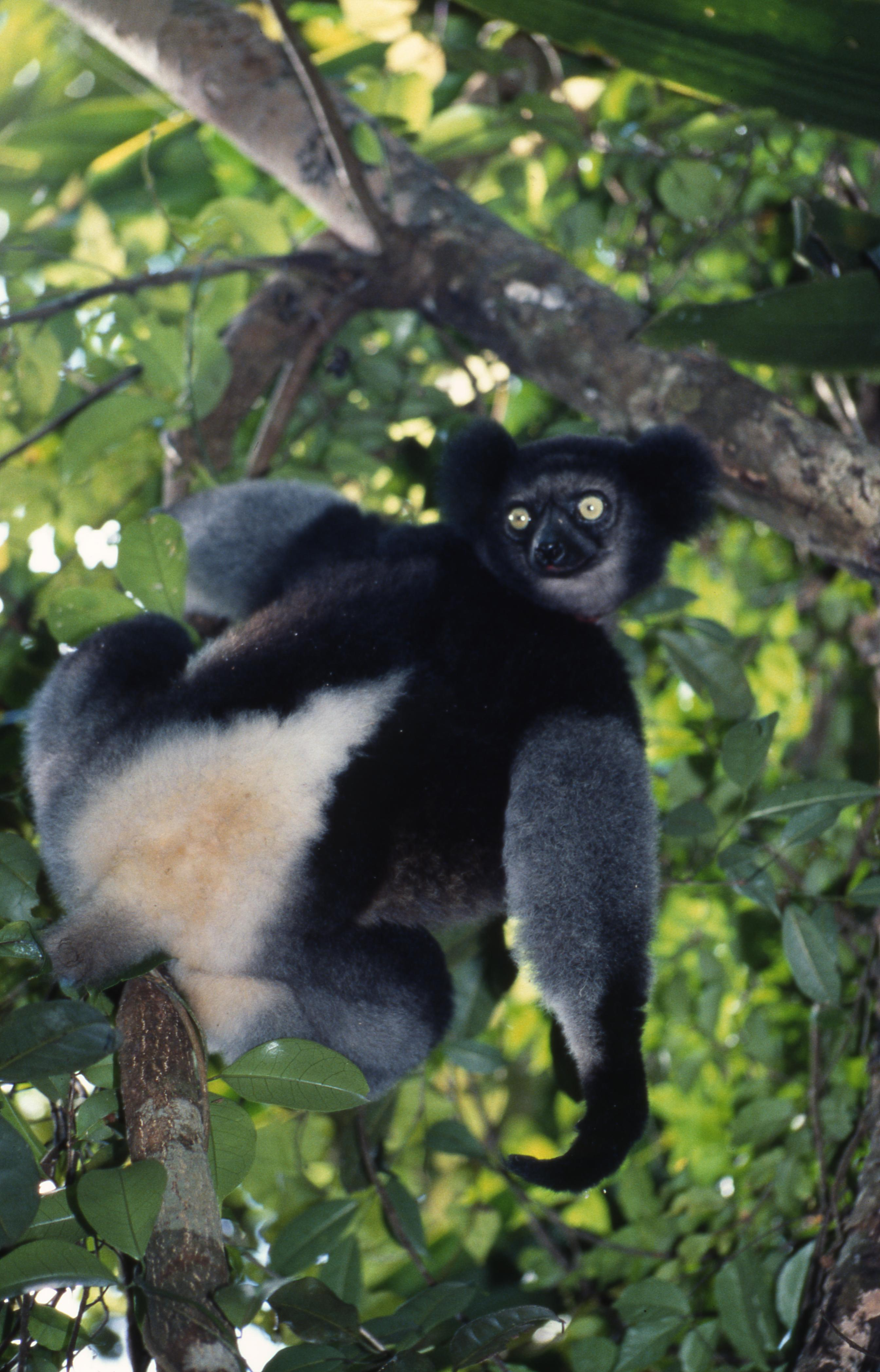
- Indri indri at Betampona Reserve

- Location within Madagascar
- Location: Atsinanana Region, Madagascar
- Coordinates: 17°53′18″S 49°13′30″E
- Area: 29.18 km^{2} (11.27 sq mi)
- Established: 31 December 1927
- Governing body: Madagascar National Parks
- Website: https://www.parcs-madagascar.com/parcs/betampona.php

Betampona Reserve is a nature reserve in the Atsinanana Region of Madagascar. It is located 40 km northwest of Toamasina and was established in 1927. The area of the reserve is 29.2 km^{2}.

Like most of the geology of the central and eastern coasts of Madagascar, Betampona consists of metamorphic and igneous rocks of the precambrian basement.

Betampona is typical of other Malagasy rainforests, which is characterized by a large variety of low canopies and small trees compared to rainforests in other parts of the world.

A hot and humid climate prevails.

== Access to the Reserve ==
11 km North of Toamasina until reaching Ivoloina, then following the Provincial road 7 for 35km.
