= Marolambo District =

- Location in Madagascar
- Coordinates: 20°03′S 48°07′E
- Country: Madagascar
- Region: Atsinanana
- District: Marolambo District

Area
  - Total: 3,581 km^{2} (1,383 sq mi)

Population (2020)
  - Total: 174,871
  - Density: 48.83/km^{2} (126.5/sq mi)
- Time zone: UTC3 (EAT)
- Postal code: 513

location map of Marolambo

Marolambo is a district of Atsinanana in Madagascar. The district has an area of 3,581 km^{2} (1,383 sq mi), and the estimated population in 2020 was 174,871.

== Rivers ==
The Nosivolo River, an affluent of the Mangoro River.

== Nature ==
- Marolambo National Park

== Access ==
Marolambo is difficult to access. Most of the year, only tractors pass the unpaved National road 23 of 130 km from Mahanoro.
