= Atsinanana =

Coordinates: 18°40′01″S 48°54′40″E

Atsinanana Region
- Region
- Location in Madagascar
- Country: Madagascar
- Capital: Toamasina

Government
  - Governor: Richard Rafidison

Area
  - Total: 21,934 km^{2} (8,469 sq mi)

Population (2018)
  - Total: 1,484,403
  - Density: 67.676/km^{2} (175.28/sq mi)
- Time zone: UTC3 (EAT)
- HDI (2018): 0.541 low · 5th of 22

Atsinanana is a coastal region in eastern Madagascar. It borders Analanjirofo region in the north, Alaotra-Mangoro in the west, Vakinankaratra and Amoron'i Mania in the southwest, and Vatovavy in the south. The region contains over 285 km of coastline, which includes many beaches and cultural heritage sites.

Atsinanana is known for its fish breeding and fishing near its ports, ore claims and mining activity, as well as its agriculture.

The capital of the region is Toamasina, and the population was 1,484,403 in 2018. The area of Atsinanana is 21,934 km^{2} (8,469 sq mi), almost exactly the same as its neighbor, Analanjirofo.

The current governor of Atsinanana is Richard Théodore Rafidison.

== Administrative divisions ==
Atsinanana Region is divided into seven districts, which are sub-divided into 82 communes.

- Antanambao Manampotsy District - 5 communes
- Mahanoro District - 11 communes
- Marolambo District - 12 communes
- Toamasina I District - 1 commune
- Toamasina II District - 15 communes
- Vatomandry District - 15 communes
- Vohibinany District - 17 communes; a.k.a. Brickaville; a.k.a. Ampasimanolotra

== Transport ==
Main highway is the road to the countries capital Antananarivo that is the National road 2. This road is continued North of Toamasina as the National road 5 in direction of Mahavelona and Maroansetra, and South, from near Brickaville as the National road 11a to Mahanoro.

=== Airports ===
There is only one international airport: Toamasina Airport, with regional flights. The remaining airports are unpaved pistes, without regular commercial flights:

- Ilaka-Atsinanana Airport
- Mahanoro Airport
- Vatomandry Airport

=== Railroads ===
There is only one railroad line that leads to the capitol Antananarivo via Brickaville by Madarail but passenger services are only available up to Moramanga.

== Protected areas ==
- Sahafina New Protected Area
- Part of Ankeniheny-Zahamena Corridor
- Nosivolo River
- Analalava Special Reserve
- Betampona Reserve
- Part of Zahamena National Park
- Mangerivola Reserve
- Part of Marolambo National Park

== Bodies of Water ==
- The Canal des Pangalanes
- the Ambalona River
- Mania River
- Ivondro River
- Nosivolo River (a tributary of the Mangoro)
- Rianila river
- Mangoro River (at Mahanoro)

== Gallery ==
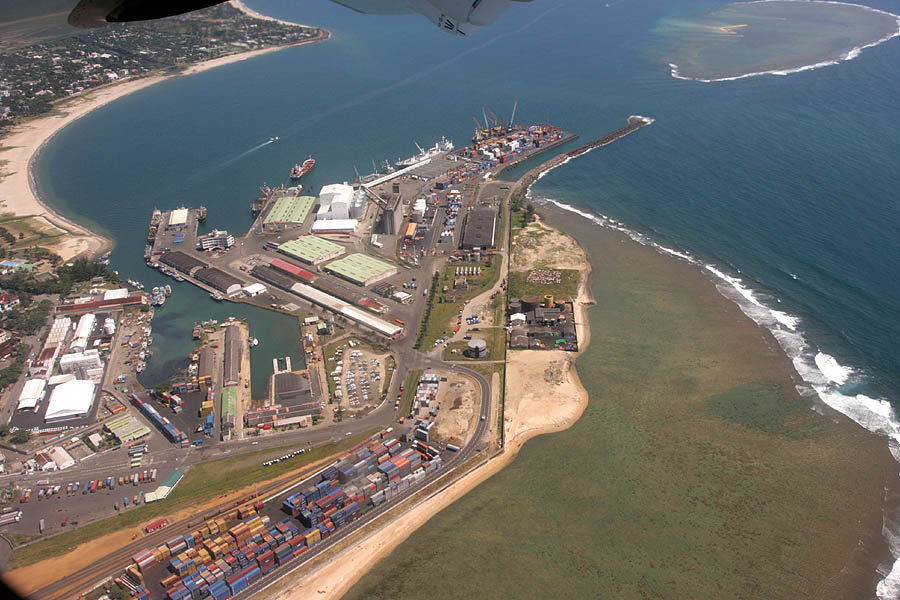
the Port of Toamasina

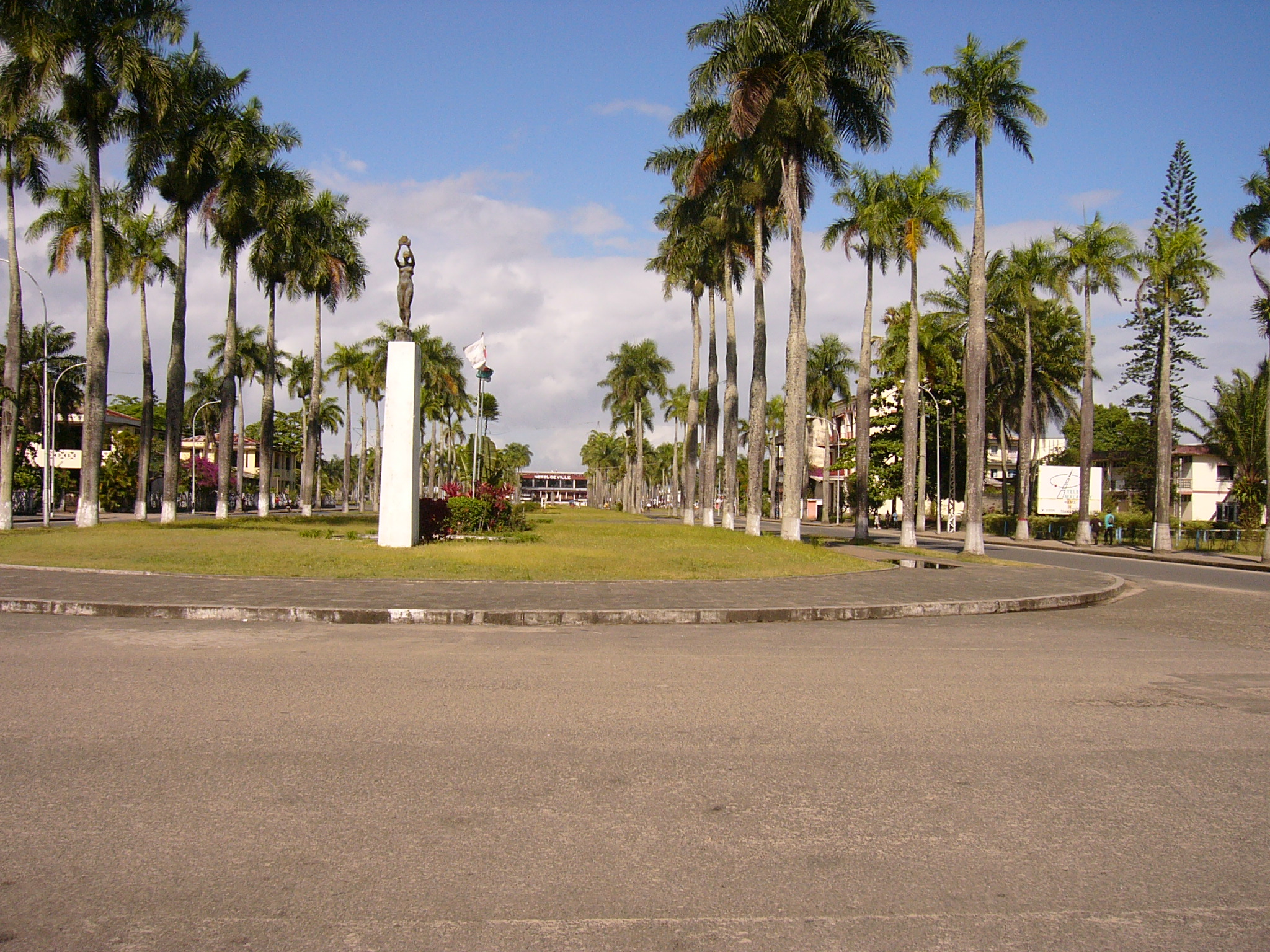
Toamasina, also called Tamatave

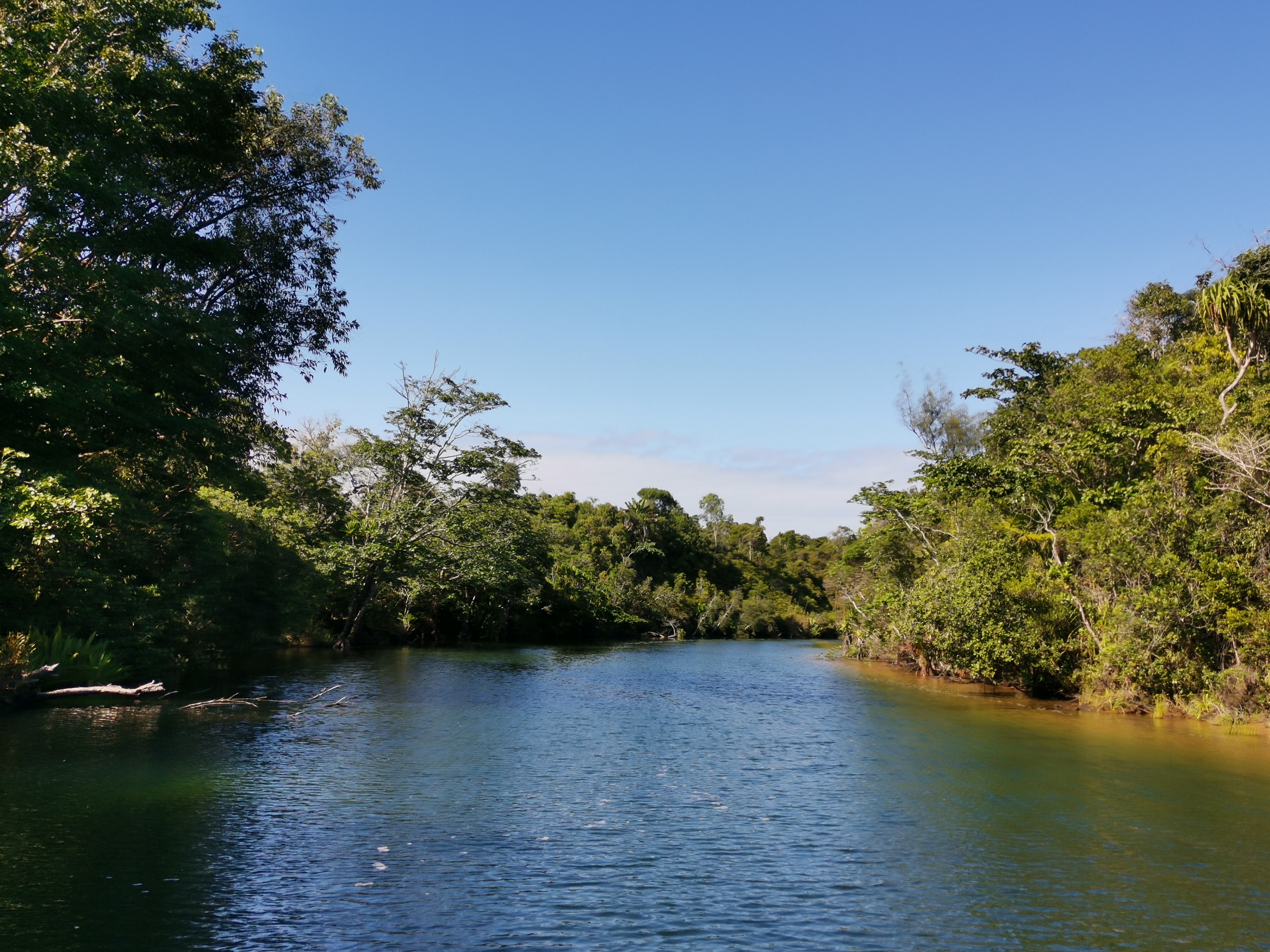
Canal des Pangalanes

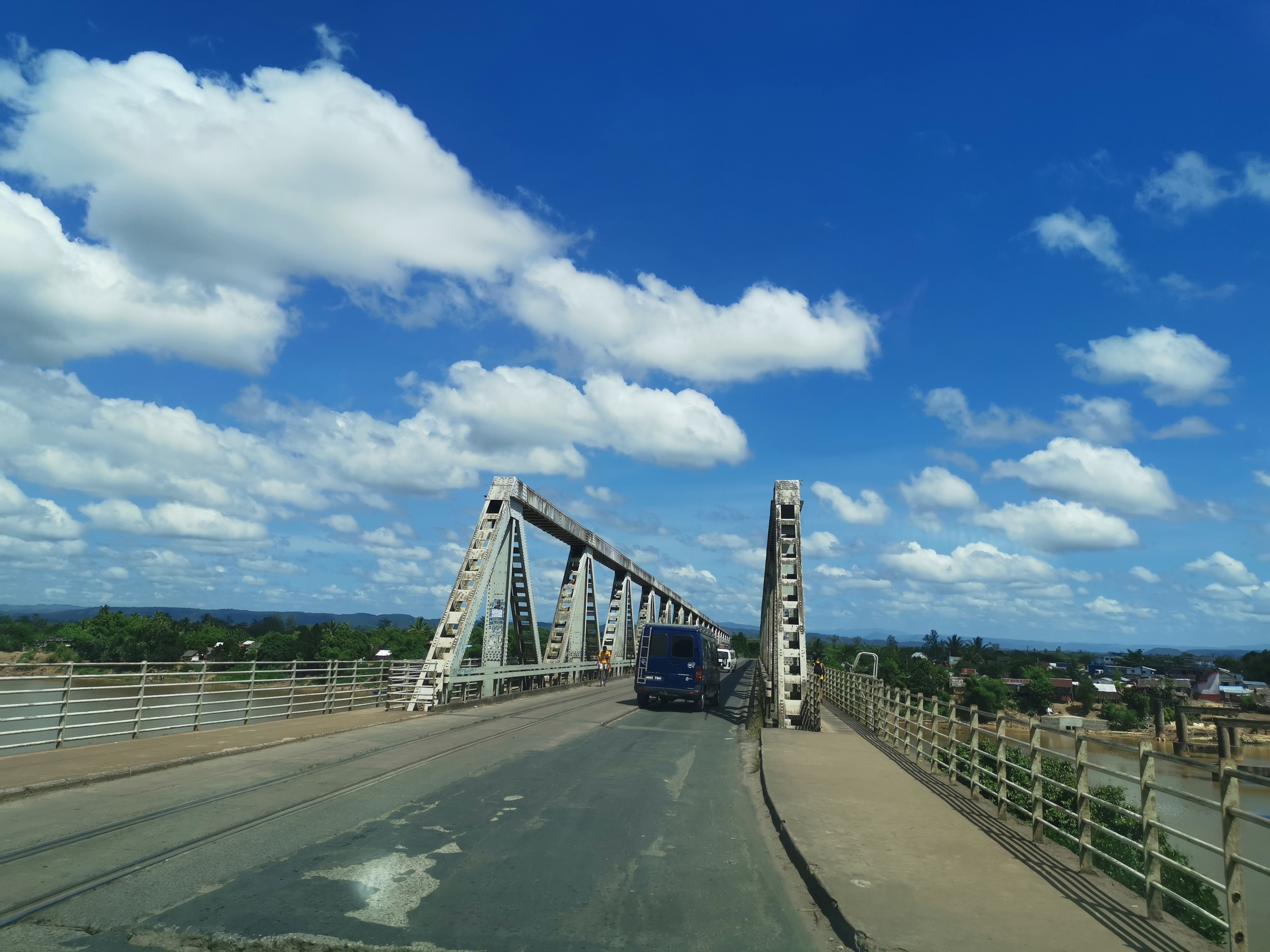
Rianila River Bridge

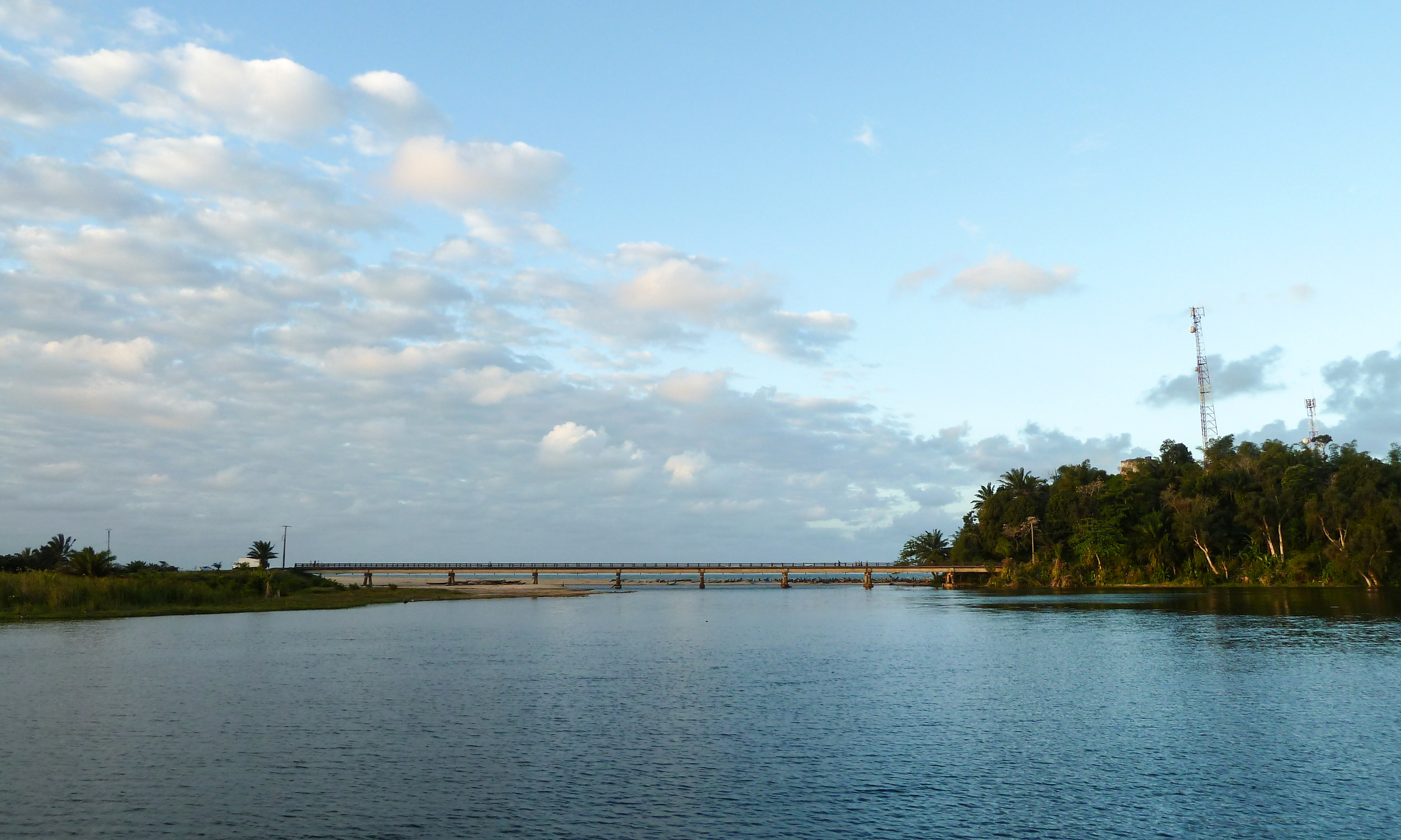
Mahanoro

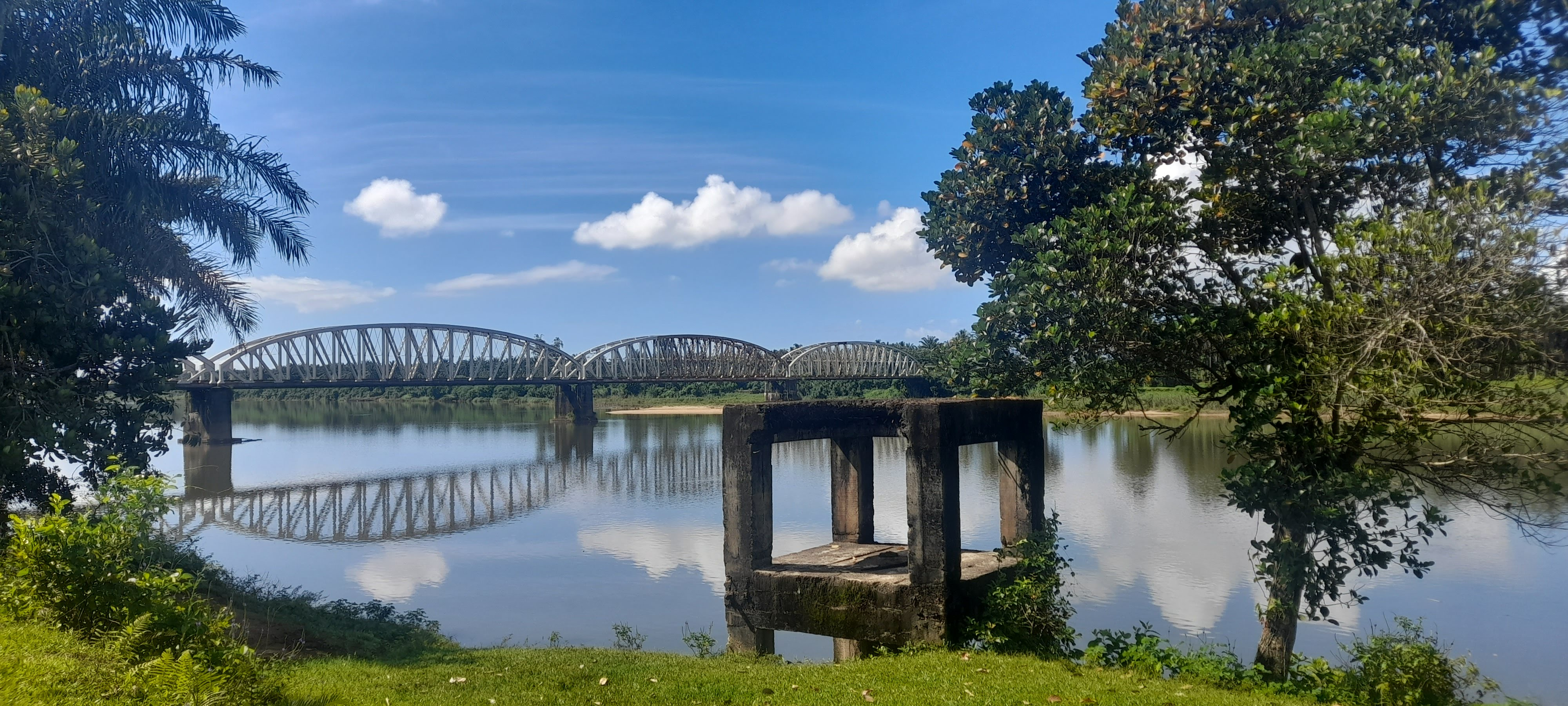
Ivondro River bridge

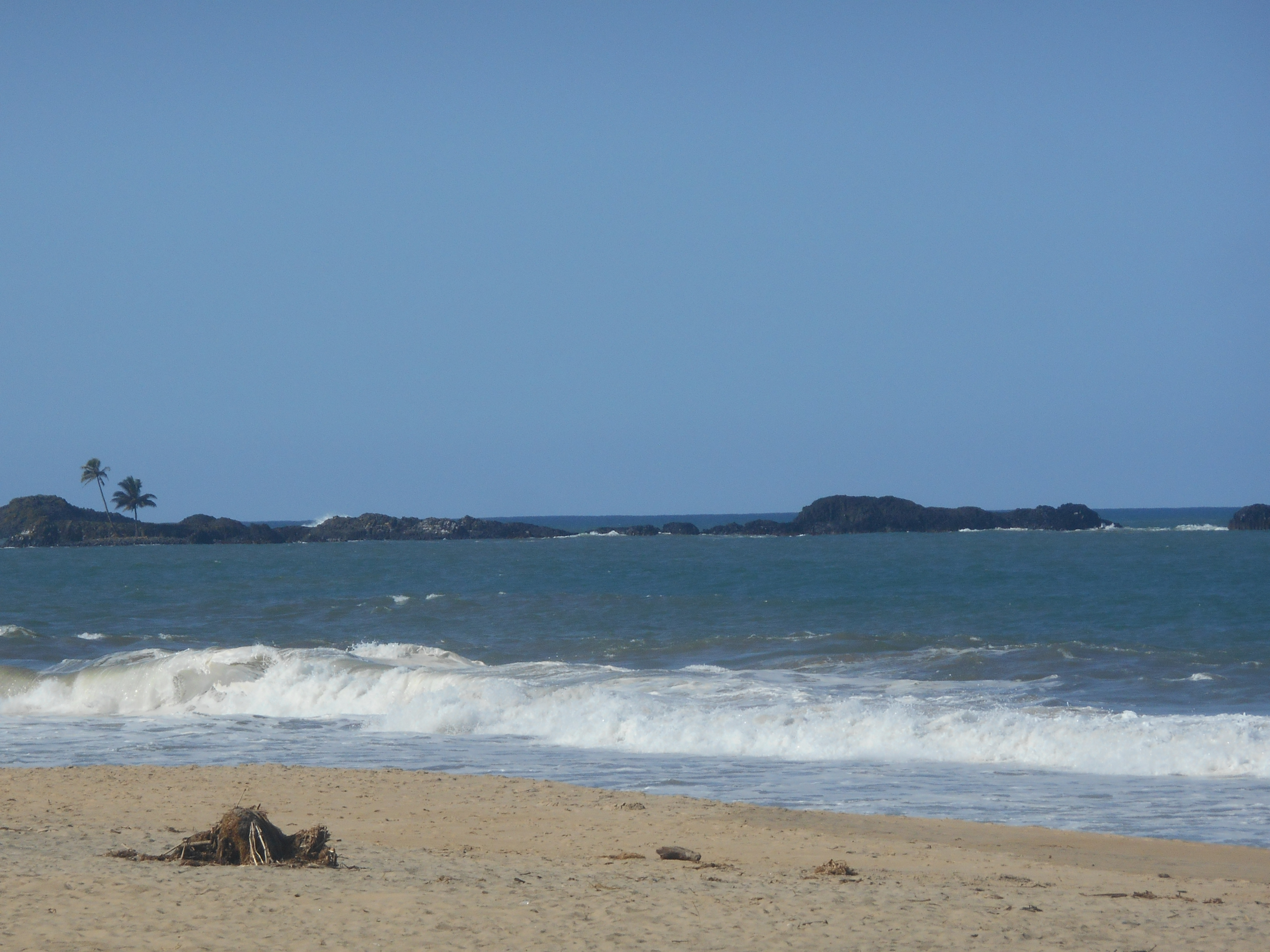
beach at Vatomandry

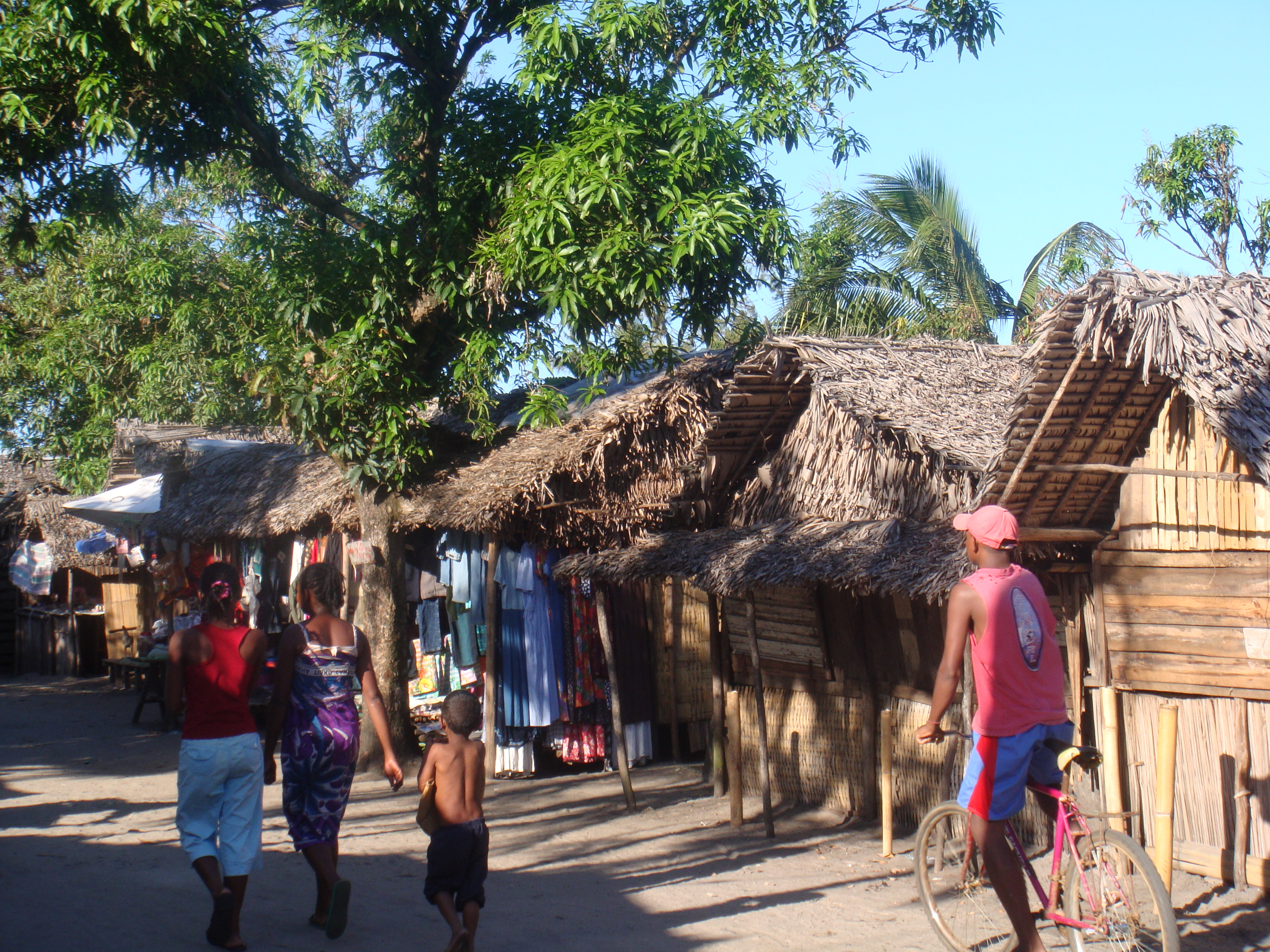
Foulpointe
