= 1999–2000 South-West Indian Ocean cyclone season =

Cyclone season in the Southwest Indian Ocean

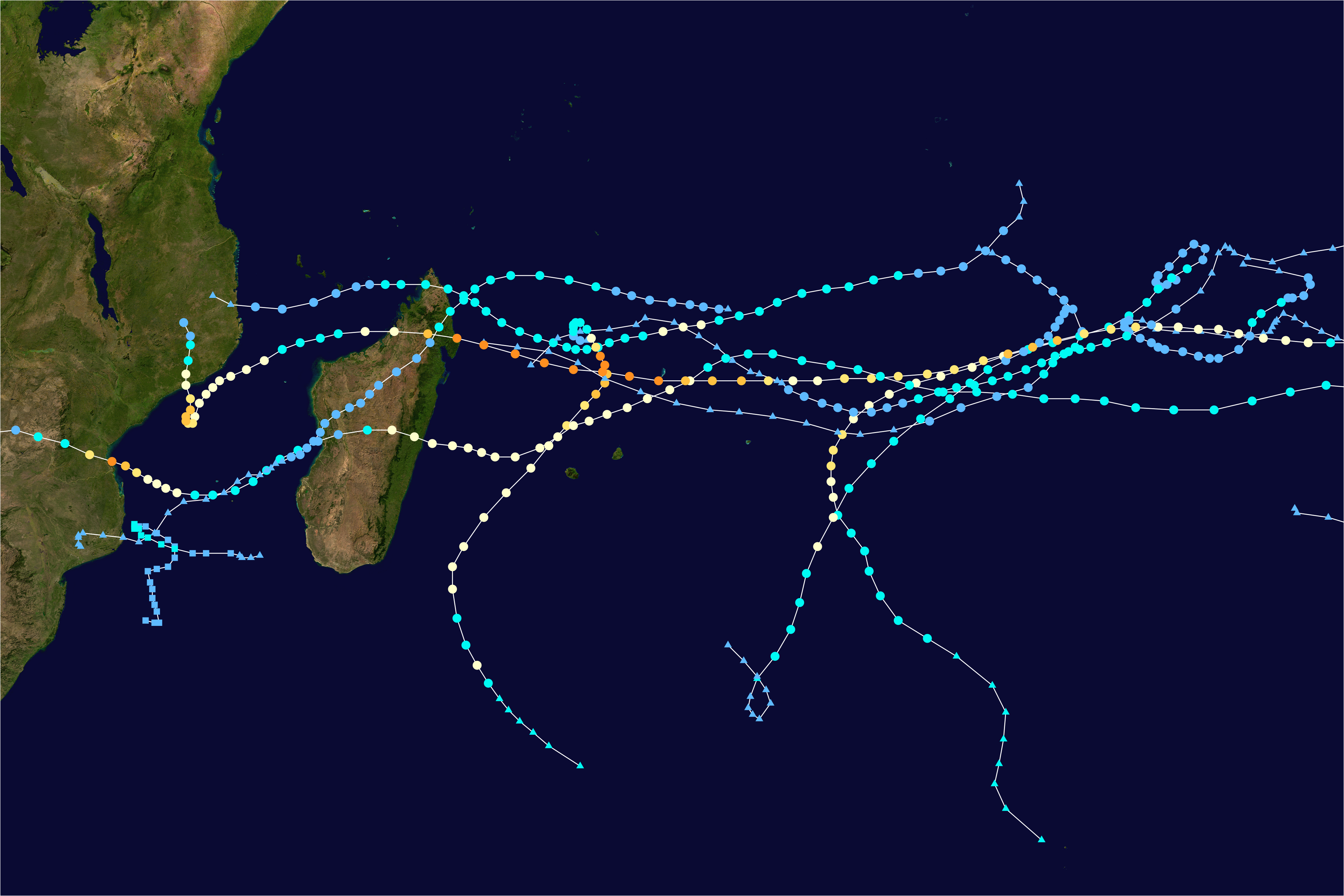
- Season summary map

Seasonal boundaries
- First system formed: December 23, 1999
- Last system dissipated: April 24, 2000

Strongest storm
- Name: Hudah
  - Maximum winds: 220 km/h (140 mph) (10-minute sustained)
  - Lowest pressure: 905 hPa (mbar)

Seasonal statistics
- Total disturbances: 14
- Total depressions: 11
- Total storms: 9
- Tropical cyclones: 4
- Intense tropical cyclones: 3
- Very intense tropical cyclones: 1
- Total fatalities: 1,044 total (Fourth-deadliest South-West Indian Ocean cyclone season on record)
- Total damage: $309 million (2000 USD)

Related articles
- 1999–2000 Australian region cyclone season; 1999–2000 South Pacific cyclone season

The 1999–2000 South-West Indian Ocean tropical cyclone season was the first on record in which two storms – Leon–Eline and Hudah – struck Mozambique at tropical cyclone intensity, or with maximum sustained winds of at least 120 km/h (75 mph). The most notable storm of the season was Eline, which was the third longest-lasting storm on record in the basin. It lasted for 29 days while traversing the southern Indian Ocean, making the strongest landfall in decades along eastern Madagascar in late February. The storm was the first in a series of three storms that struck the country in early 2000, along with Gloria in March and Hudah in April. Collectively, the three storms killed at least 316 people. The season started on November 1, 1999, and ended for most of the basin on April 30, 2000; for Mauritius and the Seychelles, the season continued until May 15. These dates conventionally delimit the period of each year when most tropical cyclones form in the basin.

Despite the destructive nature of the season, it began later than usual. Cyclone Astride originated toward the end of December, bringing rainfall and gusty winds to northern Madagascar while in the region. In January, Cyclones Babiola and Connie both formed east of Madagascar and took southerly tracks. Connie passed near Réunion island, producing 1,752 mm (69.0 in) of rainfall in the mountainous peaks and killing two people. Eline, the longest lasting storm of the season, struck Mozambique while the country was experiencing its worst flooding in 50 years, collectively causing around 700 deaths and about $500 million in damage. The storm also killed 12 people in Zimbabwe and 21 in South Africa. Just two weeks after Eline struck Madagascar, Tropical Storm Gloria affected the same general region, bringing additional deaths and damage. Cyclone Hudah in April was the strongest storm of the season, reaching peak 10‑minute winds of 220 km/h (140 mph). It caused three deaths in Mozambique, although its effects were worse in Madagascar, where there were 111 deaths. The final storm of the season was Tropical Storm Innocente, which dissipated on April 24. In addition to the named storms, there were four unnamed tropical disturbances or storms, as well as one subtropical cyclone that formed in the southern Mozambique Channel.

== Season summary ==
The Météo-France office (MFR) on Réunion island issued warnings in tropical cyclones within the basin during the season. The agency estimated intensity through the Dvorak technique, which utilized the continuous satellite imagery in the basin since May 1998. Wind estimates were sustained over 10 minutes, to be converted to 1‑minute winds by dividing by 0.88, as compared to a divisor of 0.80 in previous years. Warnings on tropical cyclones in the region were from the coast of Africa to 90° E, south of the equator. The Joint Typhoon Warning Center – a joint United States Navy – United States Air Force task force – also issued tropical cyclone warnings for the region. Beginning this season, the MFR changed their method for labeling tropical disturbances, classifying them sequentially by number. In previous years, the agency labeled disturbances by letter and number of the subsequent unnamed storm.

The season began later than usual, the third consecutive one to do so. There were no indications of tropical cyclogenesis before the middle of December, putting the season among the latest 20% since 1967 in terms of seasons' first storms. On December 26, the MFR utilized the QuikSCAT satellite for the first time in the basin to assess a storm's intensity. During the season, 14 tropical disturbances formed, which is near average, and they tended to last longer than normal. Eleven of these disturbances became tropical depressions, of which nine attained gale force winds and were named. In addition, four storms reached tropical cyclone intensity, or 10‑minute sustained winds of 120 km/h (75 mph). The 9 named storms and 4 tropical cyclones is also the basin average for each category in a given year. There were 61 days in which a storm was active, greater than the median of 48 and more than double than the previous season. In general, storms formed south of 10° S, with the exception of the first storm Astride, and most storms generally tracked east to west due to a strong ridge east of Madagascar.

== Systems ==
=== Severe Tropical Storm Astride ===
- Severe tropical storm (MFR)
- Category 1 tropical cyclone (SSHWS)
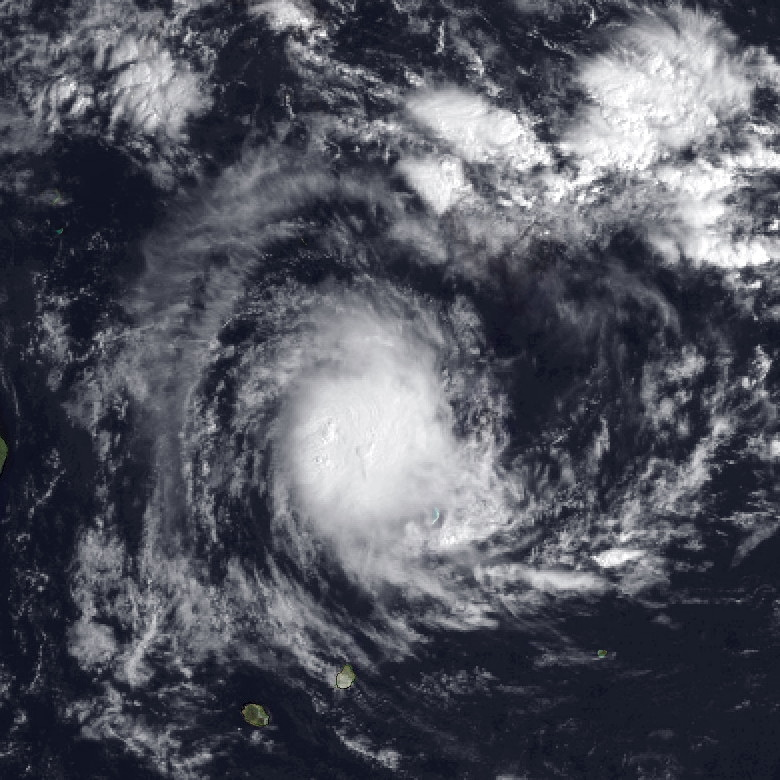
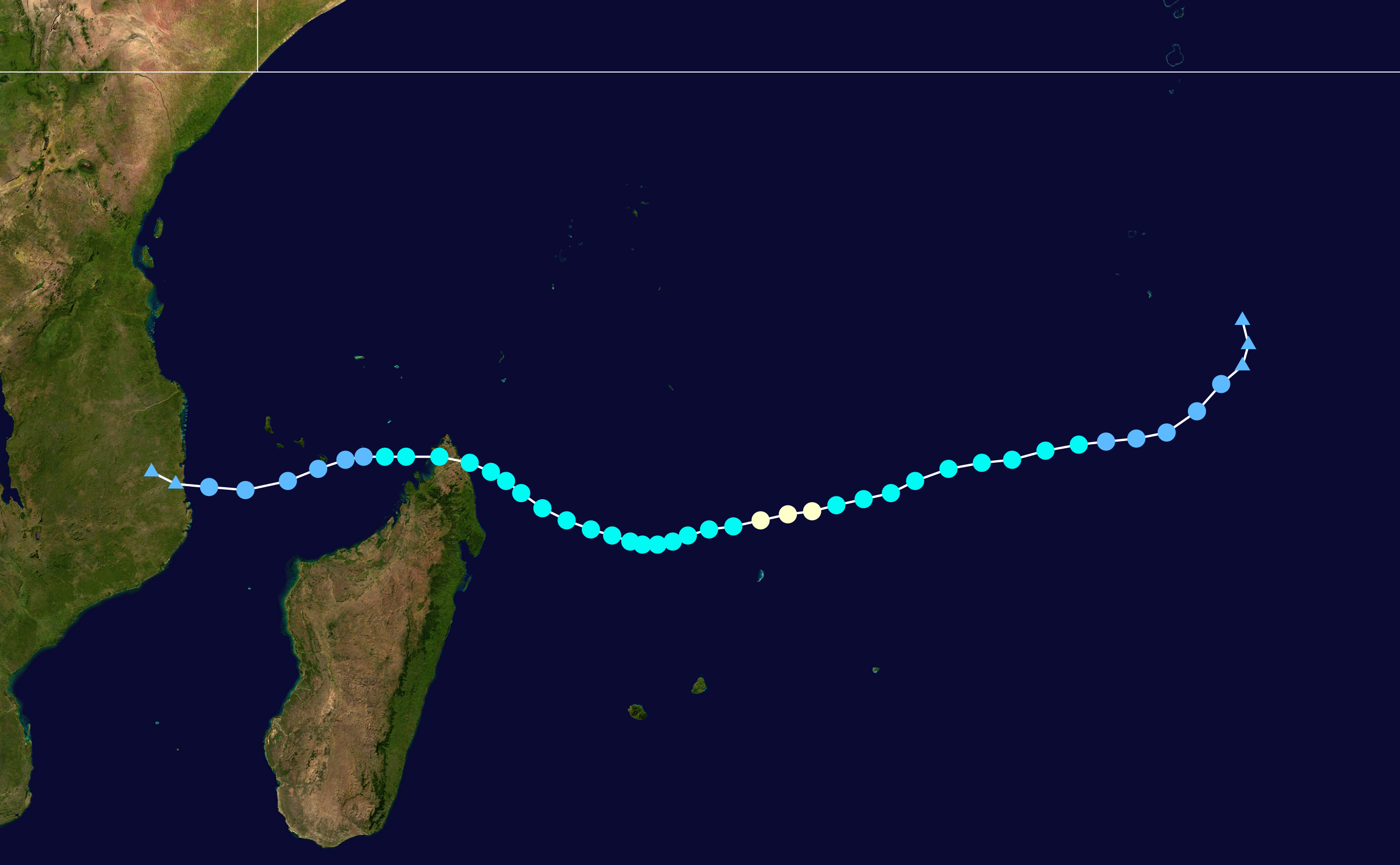
- Duration: December 23 – January 3
- Peak intensity: 95 km/h (60 mph) (10-min); 985 hPa (mbar)

On December 23, a circulation with accompanying convection became evident about 400 km (250 mi) southeast of Diego Garcia, becoming a tropical disturbance. While moving to the south, the thunderstorms organized more, aided by low wind shear, good outflow, warm waters, and its position beneath an anticyclone. Curving west-southwestward due to a ridge to the south, the system intensified into a tropical depression and later Tropical Storm Astride on December 25. That day, the JTWC classified the system as Tropical Cyclone 03S. The storm developed a large area of convection, prompting the MFR to upgrade it to a severe tropical storm on December 26, estimating 10‑minute winds of 95 km/h (59 mph). On December 27, the JTWC upgraded Astride to the equivalent of a minimal hurricane due to the appearance of an eye feature, estimating 1‑minute winds of 120 km/h (75 mph). Later that day, the storm weakened unexpectedly, perhaps related to wind shear from a trough to the south. The convection deteriorated markedly, and the weakening storm turned more to the west-northwest on December 29 due to a weaker ridge. Convection reorganized slightly, although it was dislocated from the center. Early on December 30, the storm passed about 70 km (43 mi) northeast of Tromelin Island. Curving back to the west, Astride struck northeastern Madagascar between Vohemar and Antsiranana on December 31 as a minimal tropical storm. It emerged into the Mozambique Channel as a tropical depression, and despite forecasts to the contrary, it reintensified into a tropical storm before passing near Mayotte on January 2. Early the next day, Astride weakened back to tropical depression status before moving ashore eastern Mozambique near Pemba, dissipating soon after.

On Tromelin, Astride brought strong winds, including 10‑minute sustained winds of 101 km/h (63 mph) and gusts to 127 km/h (79 mph). No damage was reported in Madagascar during the storm's passage there. When Astride passed just south of Mayotte, it brought gusts to 76 km/h (47 mph), strong enough to knock over some banana trees and to destroy a stone house. The storm also dropped 150 mm (5.9 in) of rainfall over 24 hours, including 41 mm (1.6 in) in one hour. Heavy rainfall accompanied Astride's final landfall, penetrating as far inland as Malawi.

=== Tropical Cyclone Babiola ===
- Tropical cyclone (MFR)
- Category 2 tropical cyclone (SSHWS)
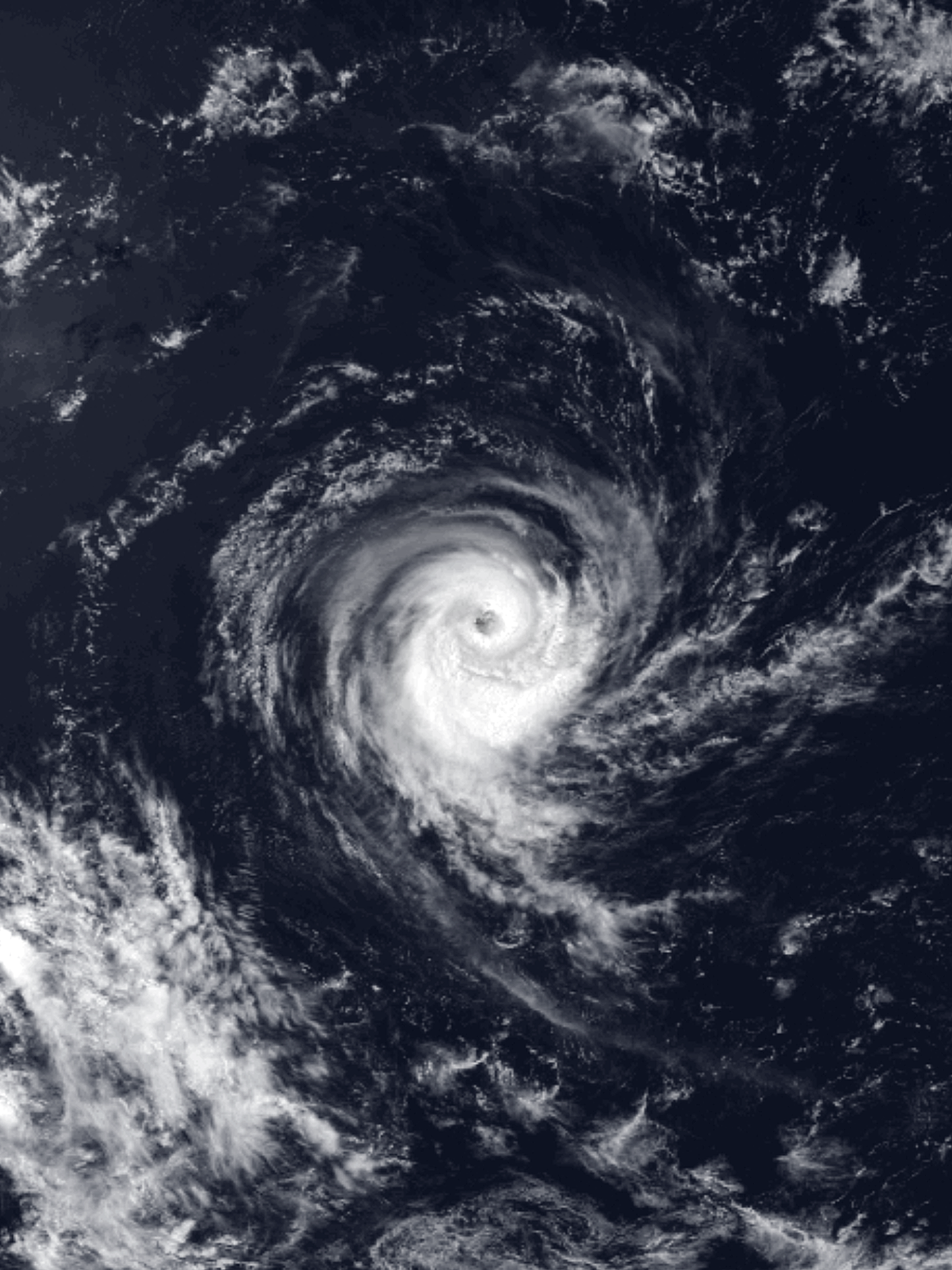
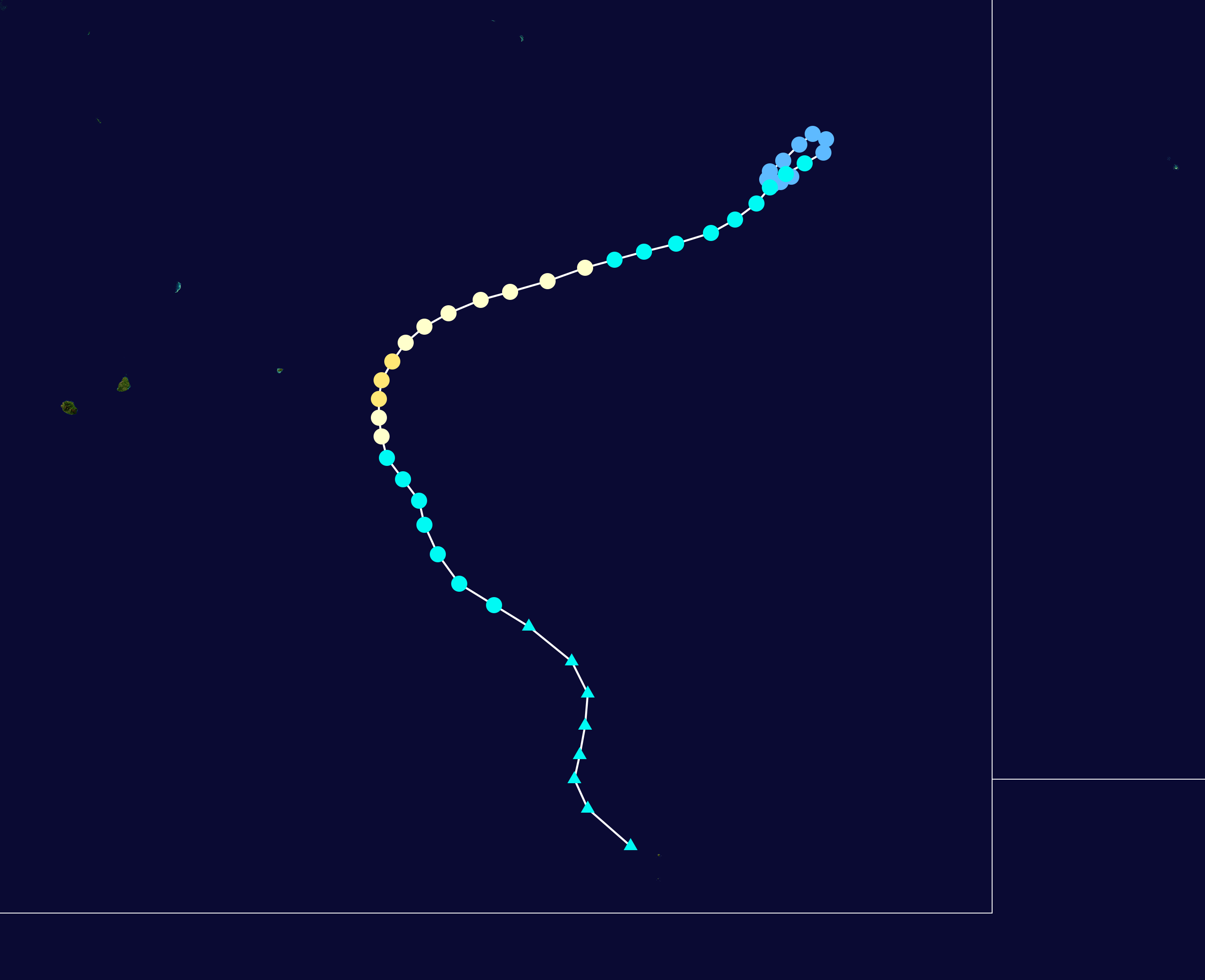
- Duration: January 3 – January 12
- Peak intensity: 155 km/h (100 mph) (10-min); 950 hPa (mbar)

Toward the beginning of January, the Intertropical Convergence Zone (ITCZ) remained active across much of the basin, with low pressure and widespread thunderstorms. One such area persisted southeast of Diego Garcia and organized sufficiently to be classified as a tropical disturbance on January 3. That day, the JTWC issued the first of three Tropical Cyclone Formation Alerts, noting the increase in convection. The system moved to the northeast along the southeastern edge of a ridge near the equator, but turned back to the southwest on January 5. That day, convection increased over the center, after having previously been dislocated due to wind shear. Late on January 5, the JTWC initiated advisories on Tropical Cyclone 02S, and on the next day, the MFR upgraded the system to Tropical Storm Babiola. The storm accelerated to the southwest and continued to intensity. An irregular eye formed on January 8, prompting the MFR to upgrade Babiola to tropical cyclone status. The outflow and the eye became more pronounced after further strengthening, and the cyclone attained peak 10‑minute winds of 155 km/h (96 mph) on January 9. The JTWC, by contrast, estimated peak 1‑minute winds of 165 km/h (103 mph).

Around the time of peak intensity, Babiola began turning more to the south due to an approaching trough. Late on January 9, the cyclone passed about 400 km (250 mi) east of Rodrigues. Increased shear weakened the eyewall and convection, and Babiola weakened below cyclone status on January 11. Early the next day, the JTWC discontinued advisories as the storm was beginning to become extratropical. The MFR followed suit later on January 12, although the agency continued to track Babiola. The storm shifted south-southwestward on January 13 before resuming its southeast trajectory, influenced by a ridge to the south. On January 14, the remnants of Babiola passed just west of Île Amsterdam, where gusts reached 90 km/h (56 mph). Later that day, the storm merged with the trough that had originally turned it to the southeast.

=== Intense Tropical Cyclone Connie ===
- Intense tropical cyclone (MFR)
- Category 4 tropical cyclone (SSHWS)
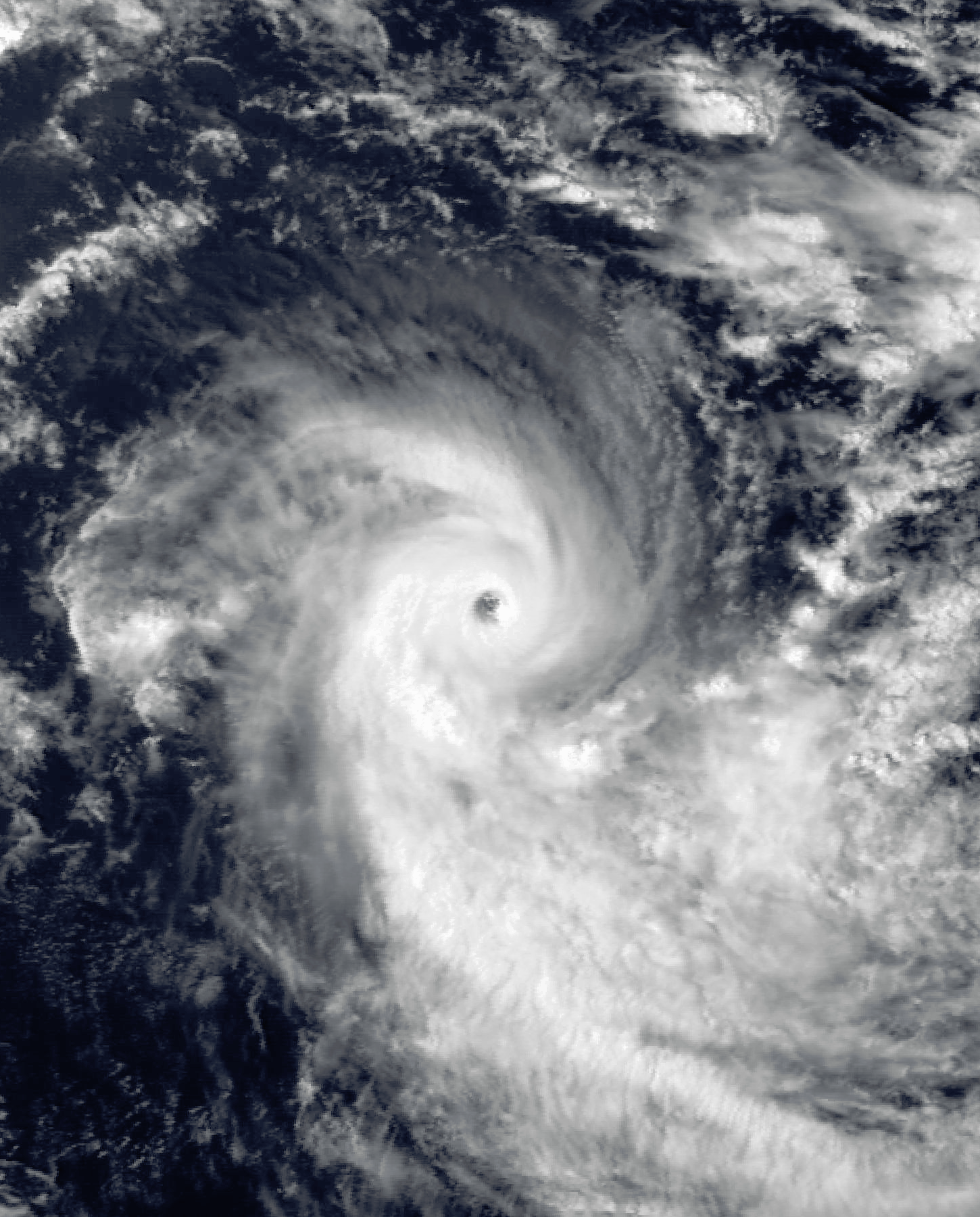
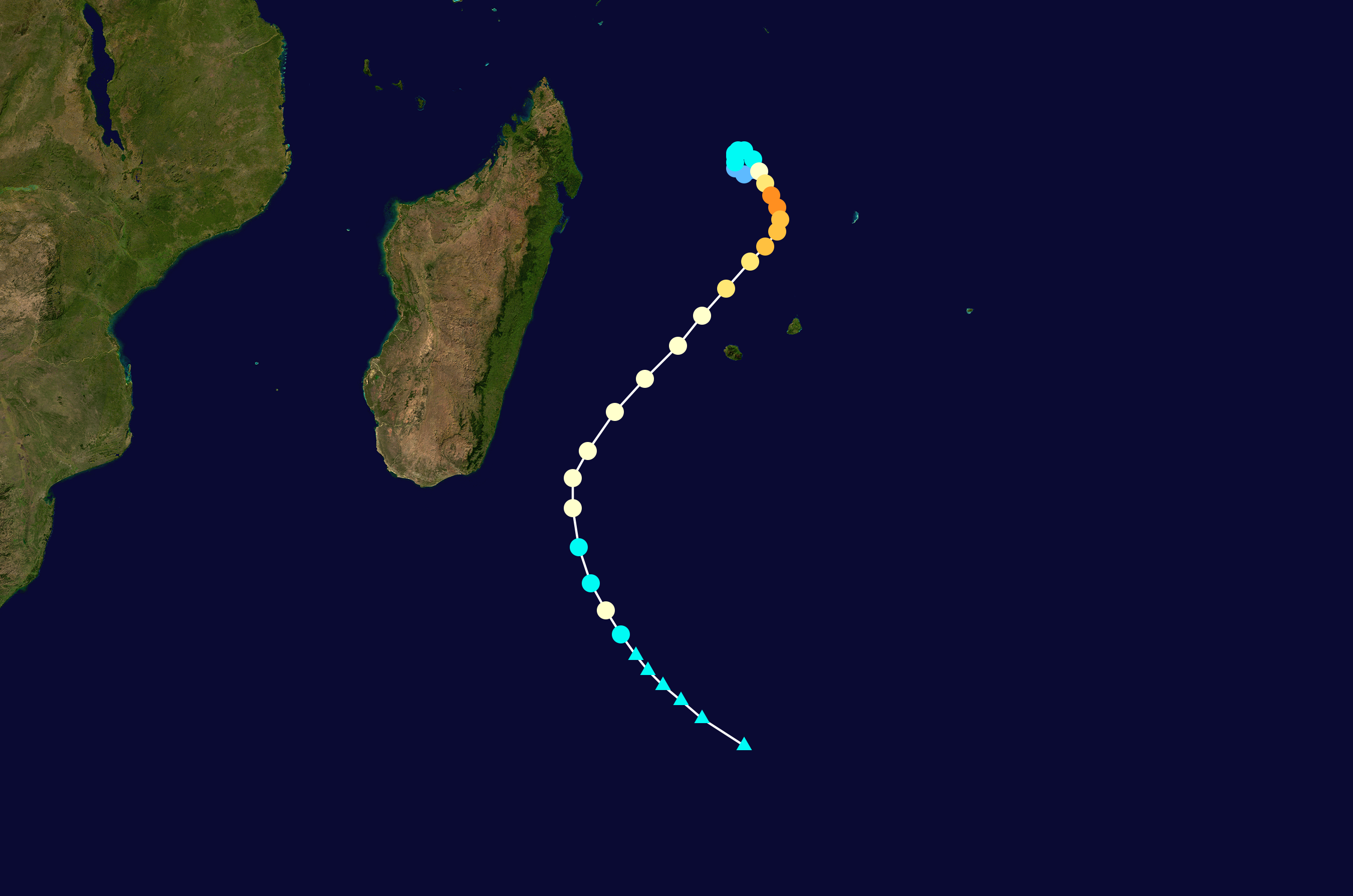
- Duration: January 25 – February 1
- Peak intensity: 185 km/h (115 mph) (10-min); 930 hPa (mbar)

An area of thunderstorms formed on January 22 east of the northern tip of Madagascar, organizing into a tropical disturbance three days later. By late on January 25, the MFR upgraded the system to Tropical Storm Connie, and on the same day the JTWC initiated advisories on the storm as Tropical Cyclone 08S. With favorable conditions, Connie gradually organized while initially stationary, later beginning a steady southeast motion on January 26. The JTWC upgraded the storm to the equivalent of a minimal hurricane on January 27, around the same time that the MFR upgraded Connie to tropical cyclone status. The storm's eye became well-defined as the winds increased, and the MFR estimated peak 10‑minute winds of 185 km/h (115 mph) on January 28; on the same day, the JTWC estimated peak 1‑minute winds of 220 km/h (140 mph). Increased shear weakened the storm as it curved southwestward, and late on January 29 Connie passed about 130 km (81 mi) northwest of Réunion. The storm turned to the southeast again and became extratropical on February 1, dissipating the next day.

While passing northwest of Mauritius, the outer fringes of Connie brought heavy rains peaking at 647 mm (25.5 in) over the span of six days, or equivalent to a month's worth of precipitation. These rains helped relieve extreme drought conditions. The storm also produced gusts of 134 km/h (83 mph), and one person died after falling off his roof. The storm also brought heavy rainfall to Réunion, totaling 1,752 mm (69.0 in), of which 1,296 mm (51.0 in) occurred in over 24 hours. Wind gusts there reached 155 km/h (95 mph) in Peite France. Many roads across the island were damaged, and about 40,000 people lost power, while more than 100 homes were destroyed. Two persons were killed, and 600 people were left homeless. Although the agriculture sector suffered the most significant damages, overall damage was minor.

=== Moderate Tropical Storm Damienne ===
- Moderate tropical storm (MFR)
- Tropical storm (SSHWS)
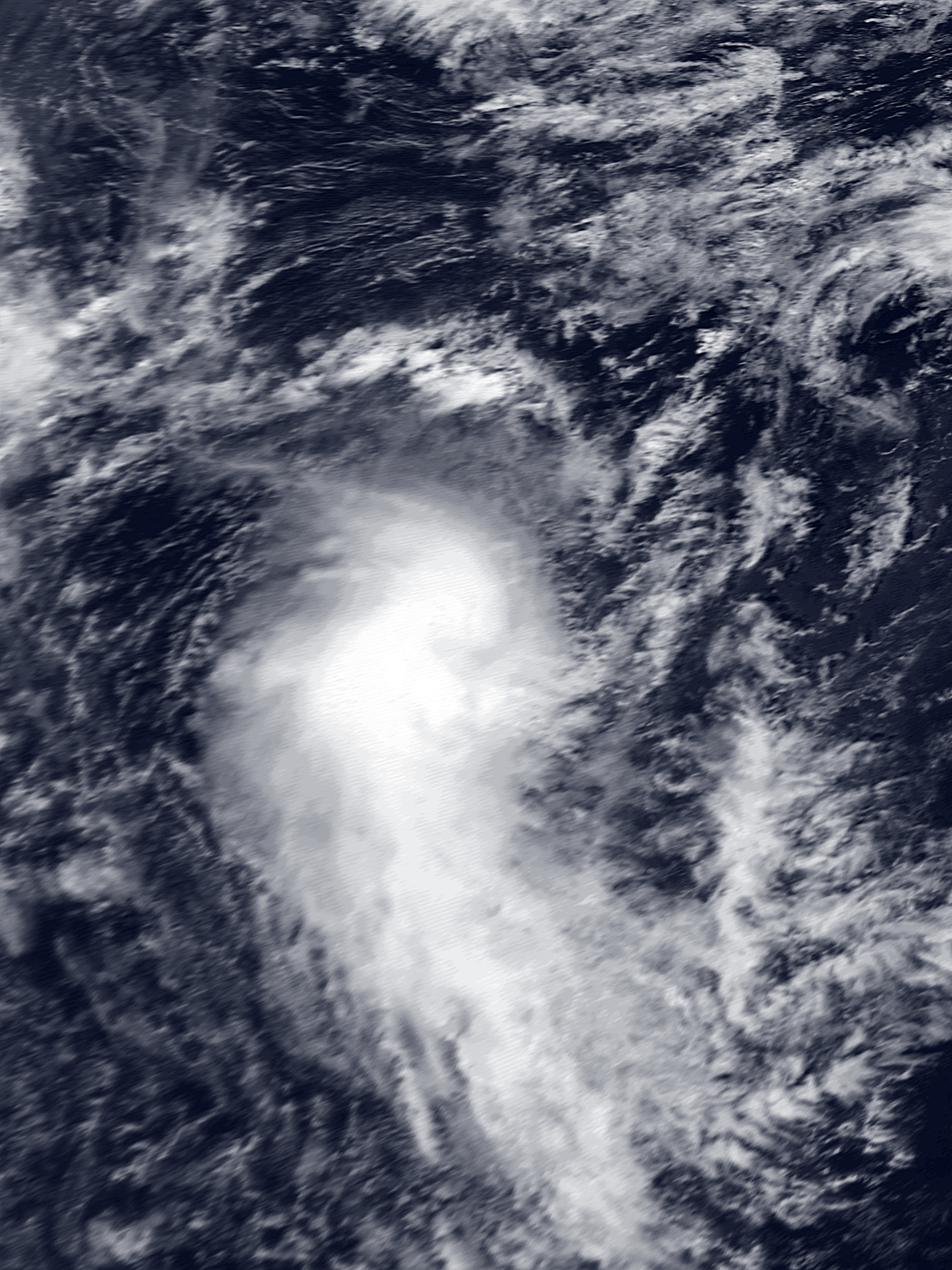
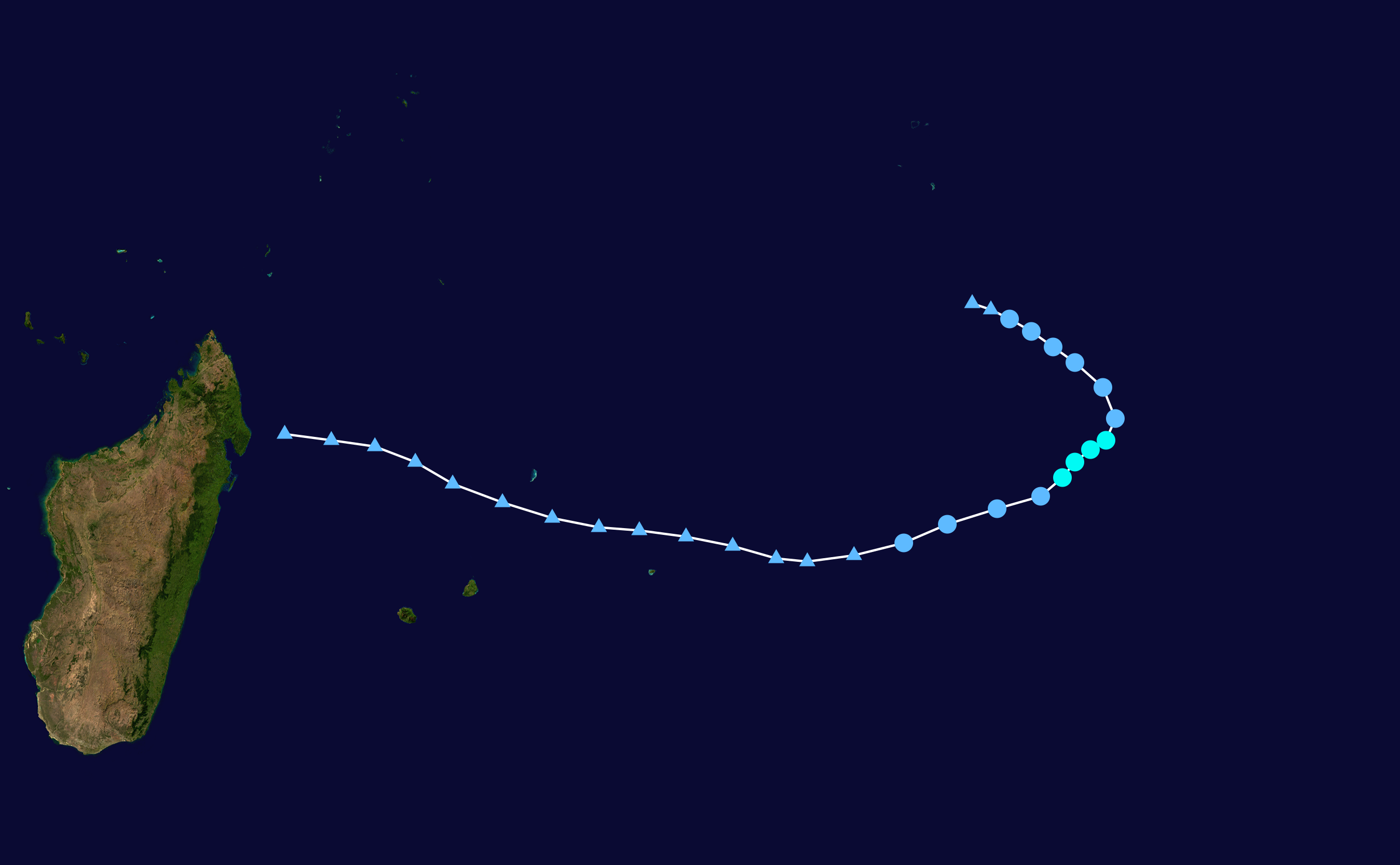
- Duration: January 30 – February 7
- Peak intensity: 65 km/h (40 mph) (10-min); 994 hPa (mbar)

The same monsoon trough that spawned Connie also produced an area of convection southeast of Diego Garcia on January 28. The circulation slowly organized, and the MFR classified it as a tropical disturbance on January 30. A nearby trough steered the system southeastward initially and later to the southwest. On January 31, the system became a tropical depression, and later Moderate Tropical Storm Damienne the next day, reaching peak winds of 65 km/h (40 mph). Also on February 1, the JTWC initiated warnings on Tropical Cyclone 10S, which estimated 1‑minute winds of 95 km/h (59 mph). Increased wind shear removed the convection on February 2, causing marked weakening, and prompting the JTWC to discontinue advisories that day. This was despite forecasts of strengthening to near tropical cyclone status. As a weak tropical disturbance, Damienne turned to a rapid westward motion, passing north of Rodrigues and Tromelin. The circulation dissipated on February 7 off the northeast coast of Madagascar.

=== Intense Tropical Cyclone Leon–Eline ===
- Intense tropical cyclone (MFR)
- Category 4 tropical cyclone (SSHWS)
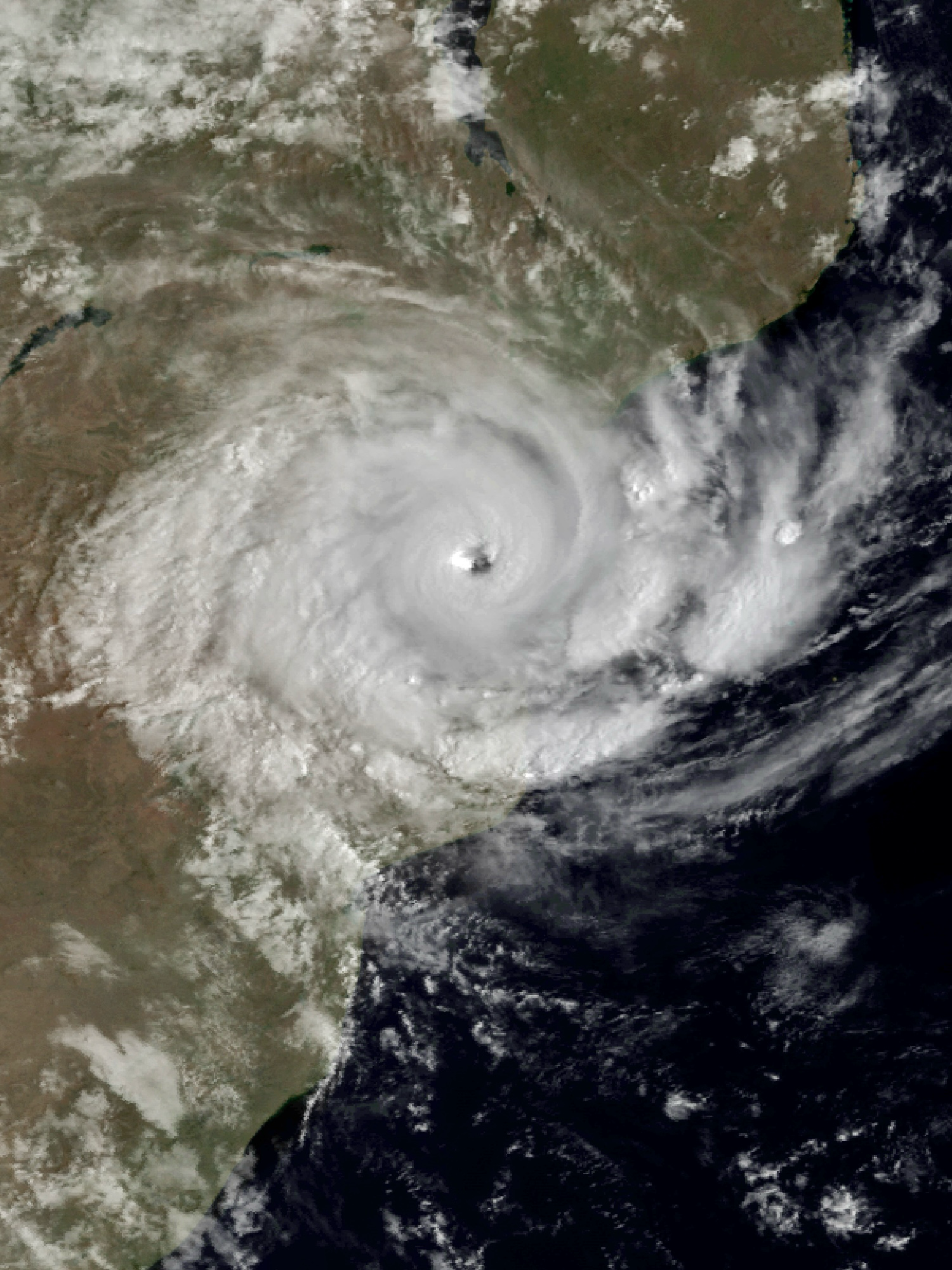
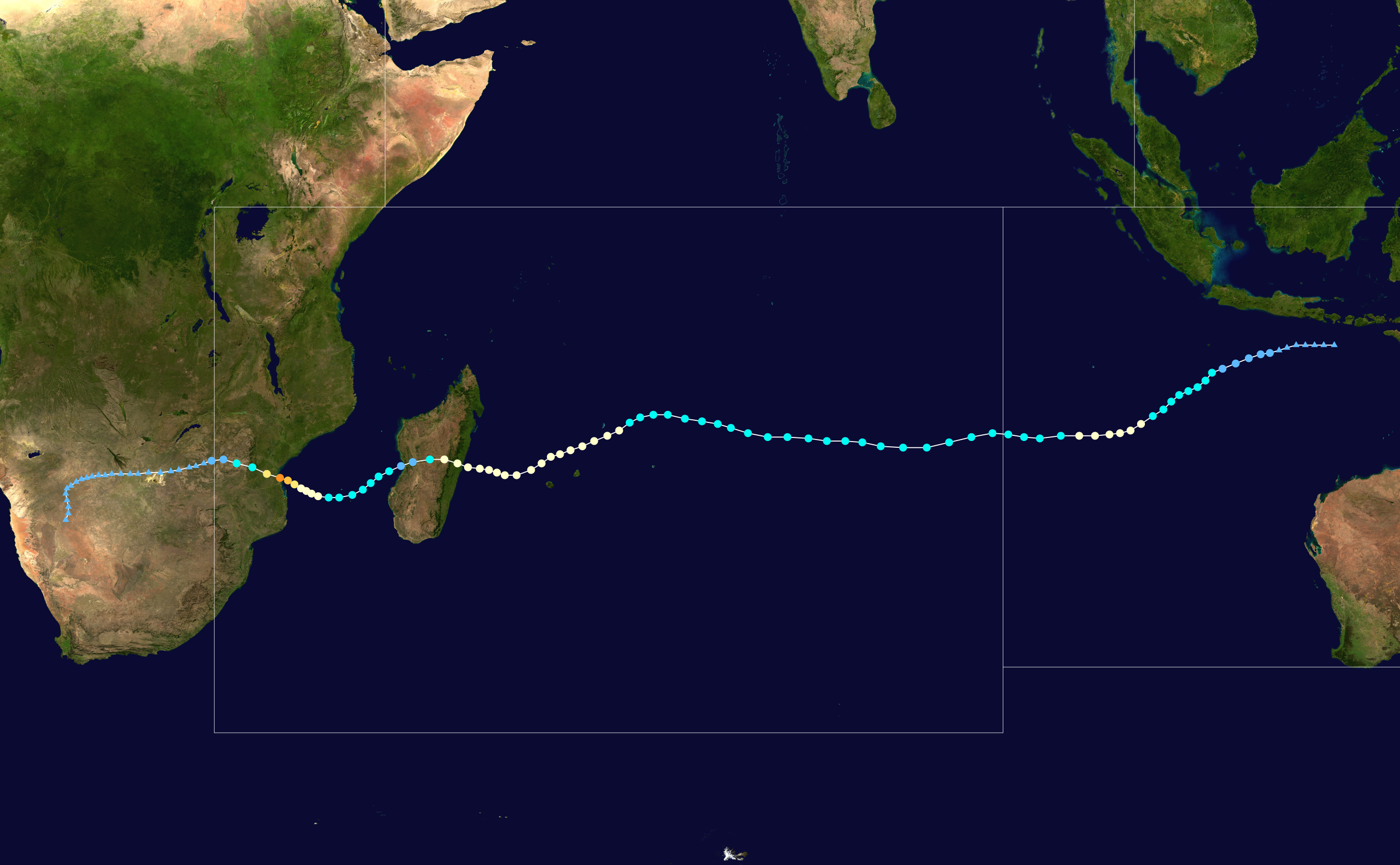
- Duration: February 8 (Entered basin) – February 29
- Peak intensity: 185 km/h (115 mph) (10-min); 930 hPa (mbar)

On February 1, a low-pressure area formed within the monsoon trough to the south of Indonesia, which would eventually become Tropical Cyclone Leon in the Australian basin, as well as Tropical Cyclone 11S according to JTWC. The storm tracked westward across much of the Indian Ocean, fluctuating in strength due to changes in the atmosphere. After crossing 90° E, the MFR began tracking the system as Tropical Storm Eline on February 8. The storm continued westward across the Indian Ocean and intensified greatly as it approached the east coast of Madagascar. Late on February 17, Eline made landfall near Mahanoro with 10‑minute winds of 165 km/h (103 mph), making it the strongest storm to hit the country in several decades. The storm rapidly weakened over land, but restrengthened in the Mozambique Channel to reach peak 10‑minute winds of 185 km/h (115 mph). On February 22, Eline made landfall about 80 km (50 mi) south of Beira, Mozambique near peak intensity and quickly weakened over land. The well-defined circulation moved across southern African, finally dissipating over eastern Namibia on February 29. Throughout its duration, Leon–Eline lasted 29 days, a record longevity for a storm in the south-west Indian Ocean. The track was over 11,000 km (6,800 mi), or about 25% of the Earth's circumference.

Eline struck while Madagascar was in the midst of a cholera epidemic that had killed over 1,000 people. The storm directly killed at least 64 people in Madagascar, although Tropical Storm Gloria struck shortly thereafter, compounding upon the damage and making it difficult to discern the individual damage totals. Damage from Eline was estimated at US$9 million. Collectively the two storms killed 205 people in the country, destroyed about half of the rice harvest, and left 10,000 homeless. In the region around Vatomandry, where Eline made landfall, 65% of houses were damaged, 90% of crops were lost, and 75% of health facilities were wrecked.

Before Eline struck Mozambique, the worst floods since 1951 had affected the nation since January, killing about 150 people. The additional rainfall and flooding from Eline created the country's worst natural disaster in a century. The combined effects destroyed over 250,000 ha (620,000 acres) of crop fields and killed 40,000 cattle. Eline's passage disrupted ongoing relief efforts, with the port in Beira blocked for two weeks due to five sunken ships. High levels along the Limpopo River isolated the town of Xai-Xai, with water levels along the river reaching as high as 11 m (36 ft) above normal in some areas, as well as 15 km (9.3 mi) wide. A dam broke along the river, flooding the town of Chokwe in the middle of the night and trapping several unprepared residents. About 55 people drowned in Sofala Province after rescue helicopters arrived too late to save them. Around 20,000 people in the capital city of Maputo lost their homes. In addition to the floods, strong winds blew away many roofs and some entire houses made of mud. The combined effects of the preceding floods and Eline left about 300,000 people homeless, about 700 deaths, and damage estimated at $500 million (2000 USD). The cyclone and the floods disrupted much of the economic progress Mozambique had made in the 1990s since the end of its civil war.

Elsewhere in southern Africa, Eline brought strong winds and heavy rainfall when it crossed into eastern Zimbabwe, due to maintaining a well-defined structure. Rivers overflowed their banks in the country, damaging crops and houses while leaving 15,000 people homeless. The storm killed 12 people in the country. Flooding from the storm extended southward into Swaziland and South Africa. In the latter country, Eline dropped 503 mm (19.8 in) of rainfall in Levubu over three days, causing the Limpopo River to reach its highest level in 15 years. Officials opened dams along the Limpopo River to prevent structural damage, which caused higher levels along the river to the east. At least 21 people died in the country, and about 80,000 people were left homeless, forcing many people into churches and schools. Damage in Limpopo Province alone was estimated at $300 million (USD). To the north, Eline dropped about 90 mm (3.5 in) of rainfall in southern Malawi, while gusty winds caused a power outage in Blantyre. Farther west, rainfall rates of 50–100 mm (2.0–3.9 in) were also reported in Botswana.

=== Severe Tropical Storm Felicia ===
- Severe tropical storm (MFR)
- Category 1 tropical cyclone (SSHWS)
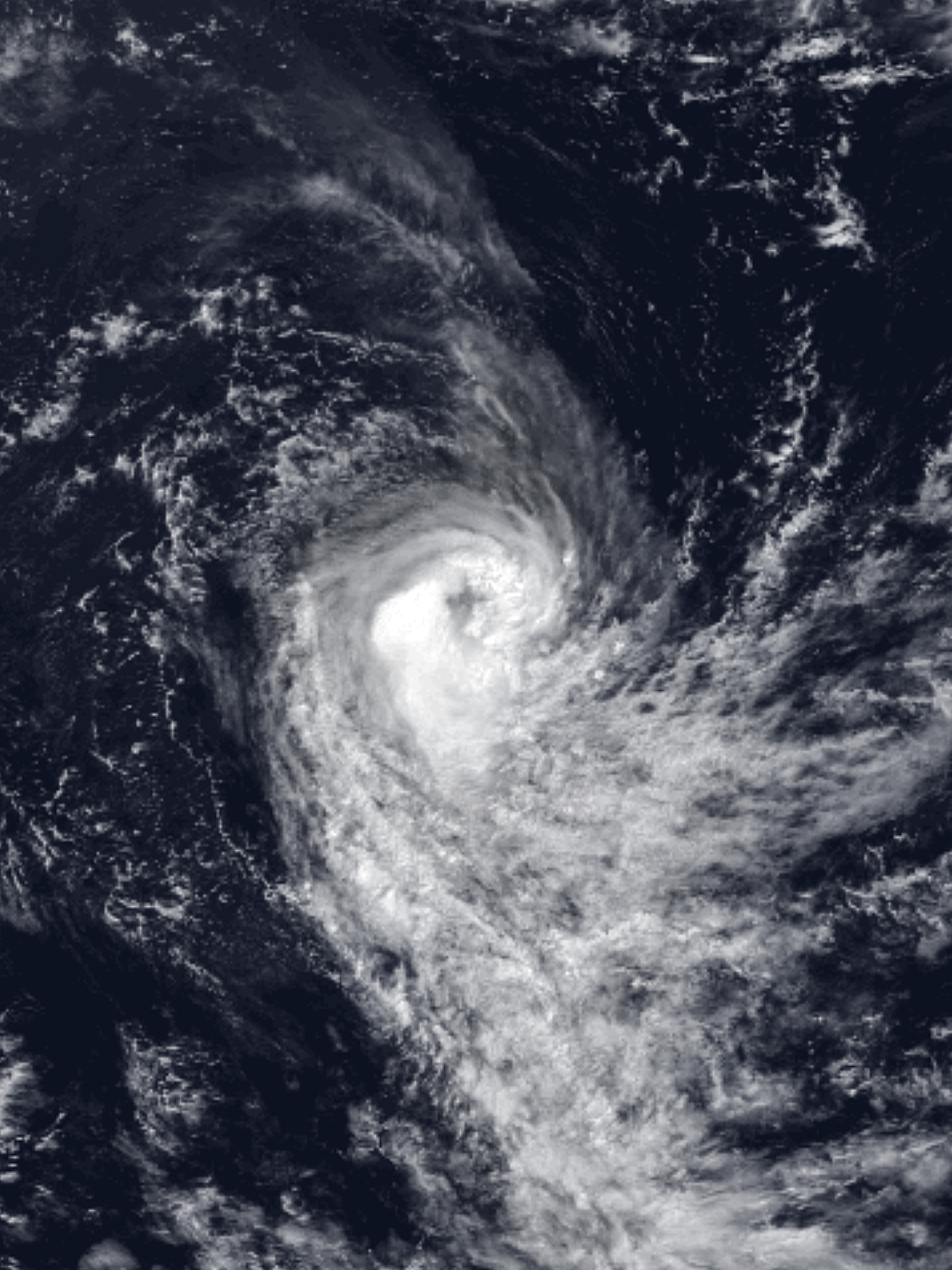
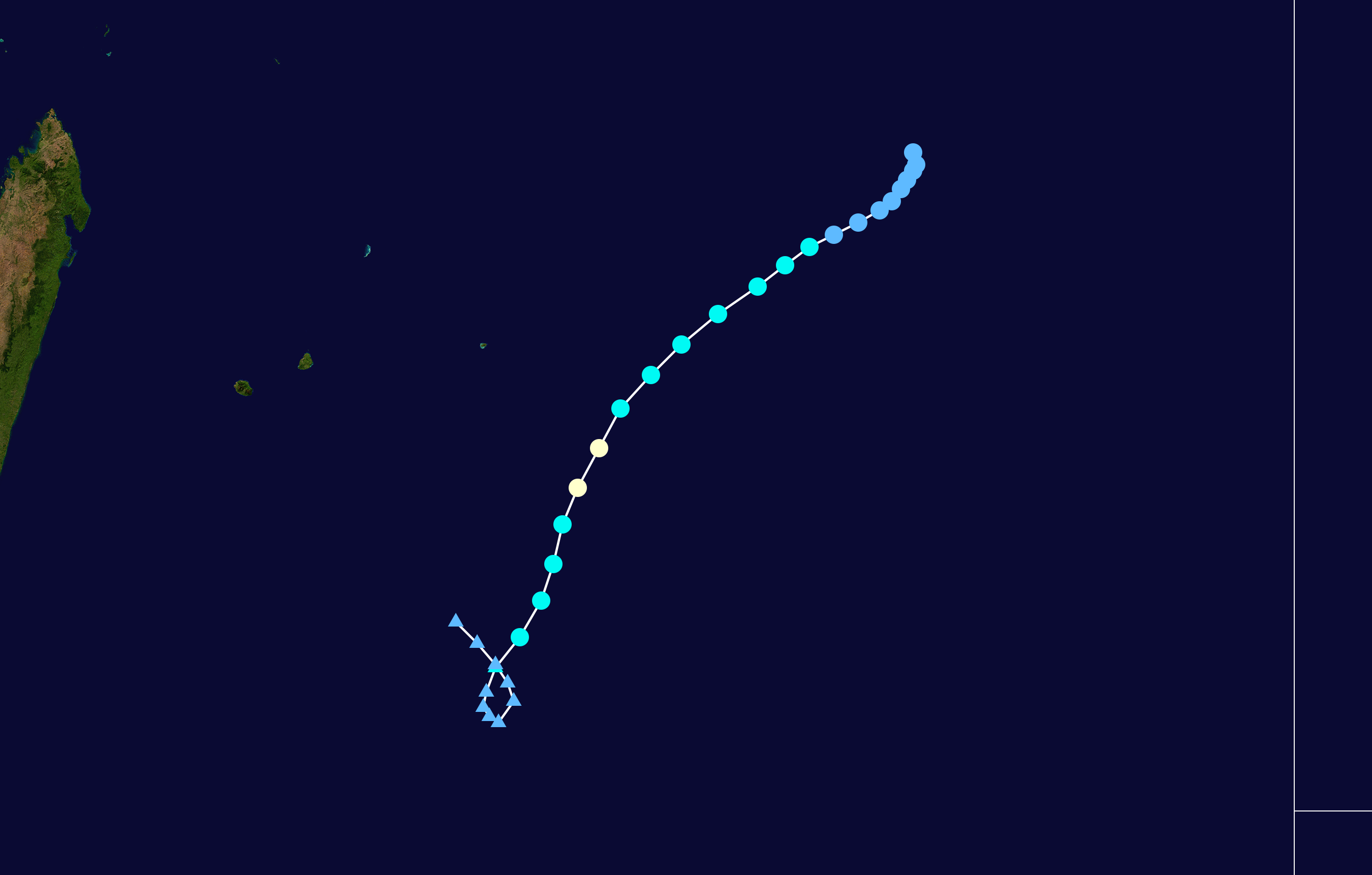
- Duration: February 18 – February 24
- Peak intensity: 110 km/h (70 mph) (10-min); 975 hPa (mbar)

While Eline was making landfall on Madagascar, another area of convection formed to its east on February 17 within the ITCZ. Its structure was similar to a monsoon depression, due to a large circulation with weak winds near the center. However, it was organized enough to be classified as a tropical disturbance on February 18 to the southeast of Diego Garcia. It moved southeastward with increasing convection, prompting the Mauritius Meteorological Service to name it Felicia while still as a tropical depression on February 20. The convection however remained disorganized, and there were several small circulations within the broad gyre. After turning to the southwest due to a nearby trough, Felicia's circulation became more compact, as evidenced by a QuikSCAT pass. Outflow increased as wind shear decreased, and Felicia became a moderate tropical storm on February 21. On the same day, the JTWC initiated advisories on the storm as Tropical Cyclone 12S.

Late on February 22, the JTWC upgraded the storm to the equivalent of a minimal hurricane, while the MFR estimated peak 10‑minute winds of 110 km/h (68 mph). This was based on a 100 km (62 mi) wide eye feature that had developed in the storm's center. Around the time of peak intensity, Felicia passed about 500 km (310 mi) southeast of Rodrigues. The interaction of the trough and a ridge to the east increased wind shear, causing the storm to weaken. On February 24, the storm became extratropical while still maintaining a well-defined circulation. It slowed and looped back to the northwest due to a ridge to the south, gradually becoming less defined and dissipating on February 26.

=== Severe Tropical Storm Gloria ===
- Severe tropical storm (MFR)
- Tropical storm (SSHWS)
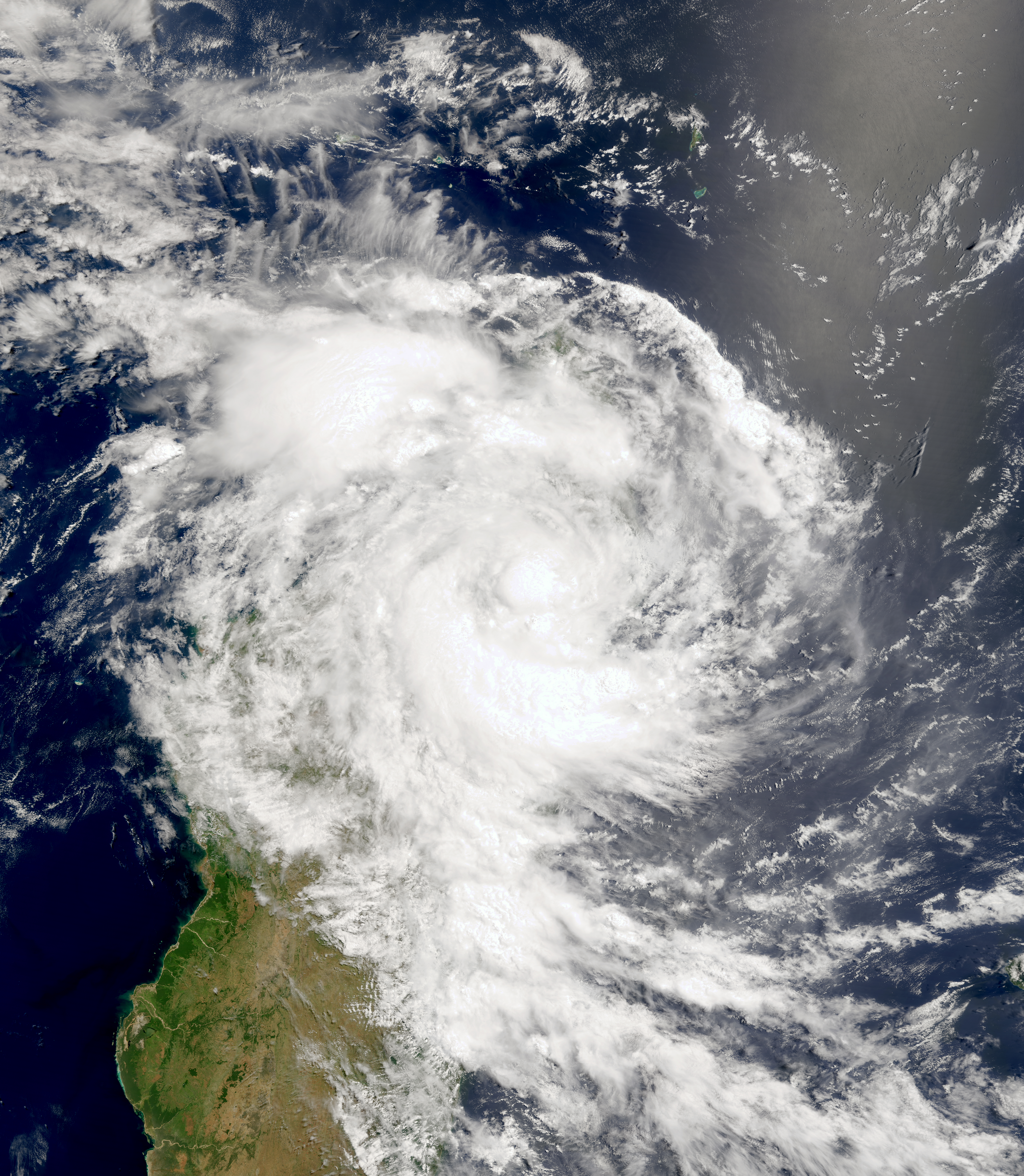
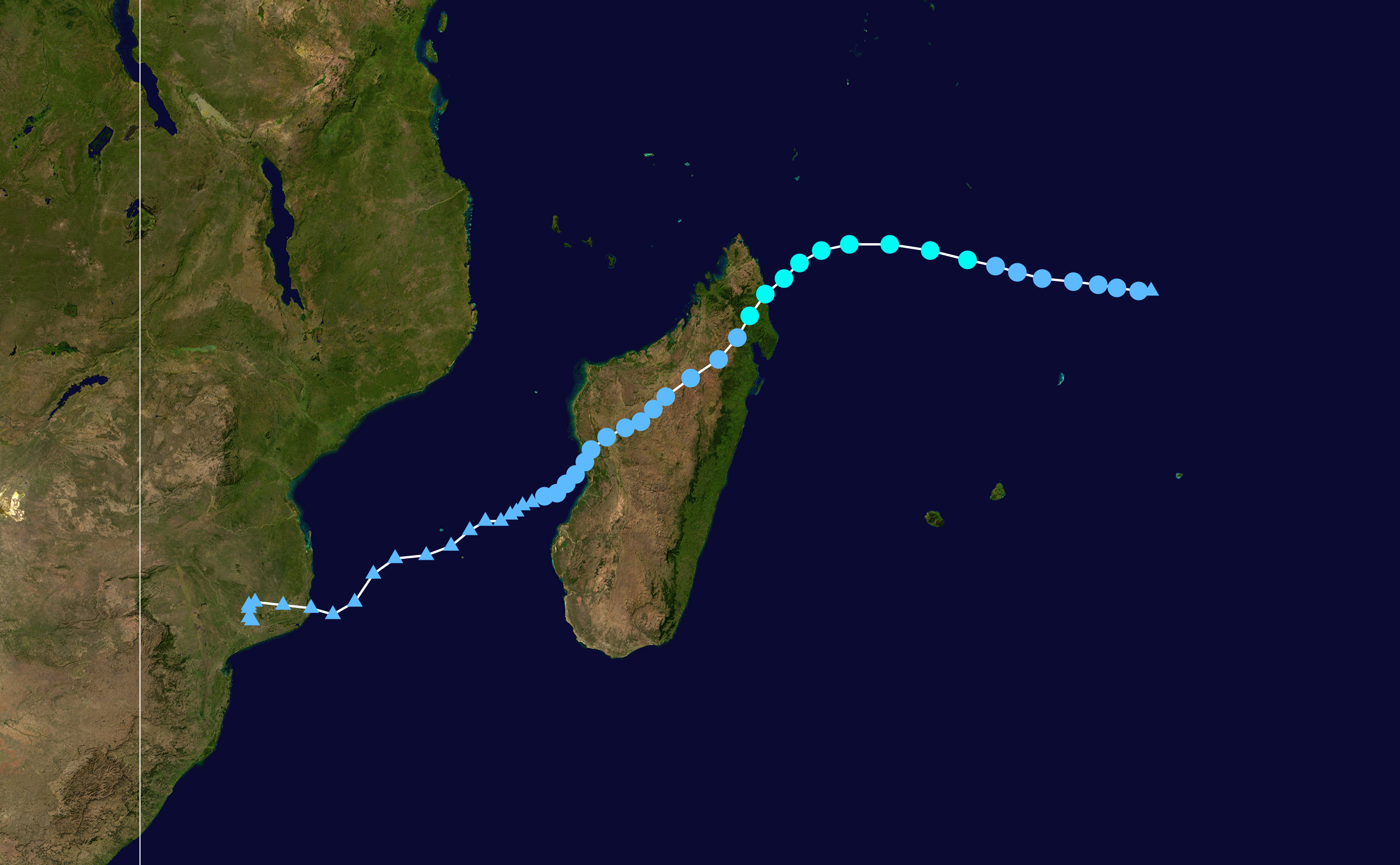
- Duration: February 27 – March 10
- Peak intensity: 95 km/h (60 mph) (10-min); 985 hPa (mbar)

On February 27, a circulation formed within the monsoon trough between Diego Garcia and St. Brandon, displaced due to wind shear, but organized enough for the MFR to track it as Tropical Disturbance 8. The shear gradually decreased, allowing the thunderstorms to organize as it moved westward. On February 28, the JTWC classified the system as Tropical Cyclone 15S, and on February 29 the MFR upgraded it to tropical depression status. The depression turned west-northwestward before rounding a ridge and turning to the southwest. The thunderstorms organized into a central dense overcast on March 1, prompting the MFR to upgrade it to Moderate Tropical Storm Gloria only 150 km (93 mi) from the northeast coast of Madagascar. Gloria continued quickly to the southwest, gradually intensifying and developing an eye feature; on that basis, the MFR estimated peak 10‑minute winds of 95 km/h (59 mph), or severe tropical storm status, by the time it made landfall 10 km (6.2 mi) north of Sambava. Operationally, the JTWC upgraded Gloria to the equivalent of a minimal hurricane, with 1‑minute winds of 120 km/h (75 mph), although the agency downgraded the storm to the same peak as the MFR. The structure initially remained well-defined, although the circulation became difficult to locate as it progressed through the country. On March 4, the system exited Madagascar into the Mozambique Channel with scattered thunderstorms slowly reforming. On the next day, the JTWC discontinued advisories, although the MFR continued monitoring the system, labeling it as a tropical disturbance on March 8. Later that day, Gloria made landfall near Inhambane in southeastern Mozambique before turning to a southward drift, dissipating on March 10.

As a developing disturbance, Gloria produced winds approaching gale-force on St. Brandon. Similar conditions were reported on Tromelin. When Gloria struck Madagascar, it produced sustained winds of 72 km/h (45 mph) at Antalaha, about 70 km (43 mi) south of Sambava. The storm brought heavy rainfall, with Mananjary reporting a two‑day total of 427 mm (16.8 in). The rains from Gloria occurred less than two weeks after Cyclone Leon–Eline struck the country, bringing additional flooding, landslides, and damage. In Sambava, near where Gloria moved ashore, the storm killed 18 people, destroyed hundreds of homes, and damaged a road connecting the area to the capital of Madagascar, Antananarivo. Farther inland, the cyclone killed 40 people at Andapa. Overall, Gloria killed at least 66 people, although the exact toll was initially unknown due to disrupted communications. Before Gloria emerged into the Mozambique Channel, various news outlets noted the potential for the storm to affect storm-ravaged Mozambique. However, minimal rainfall accompanied Gloria's final landfall. The rains were enough to delay flights for a day, which were transporting relief aid following Eline's devastating landfall in Mozambique.

=== Very Intense Tropical Cyclone Hudah ===
- Very intense tropical cyclone (MFR)
- Category 4 tropical cyclone (SSHWS)
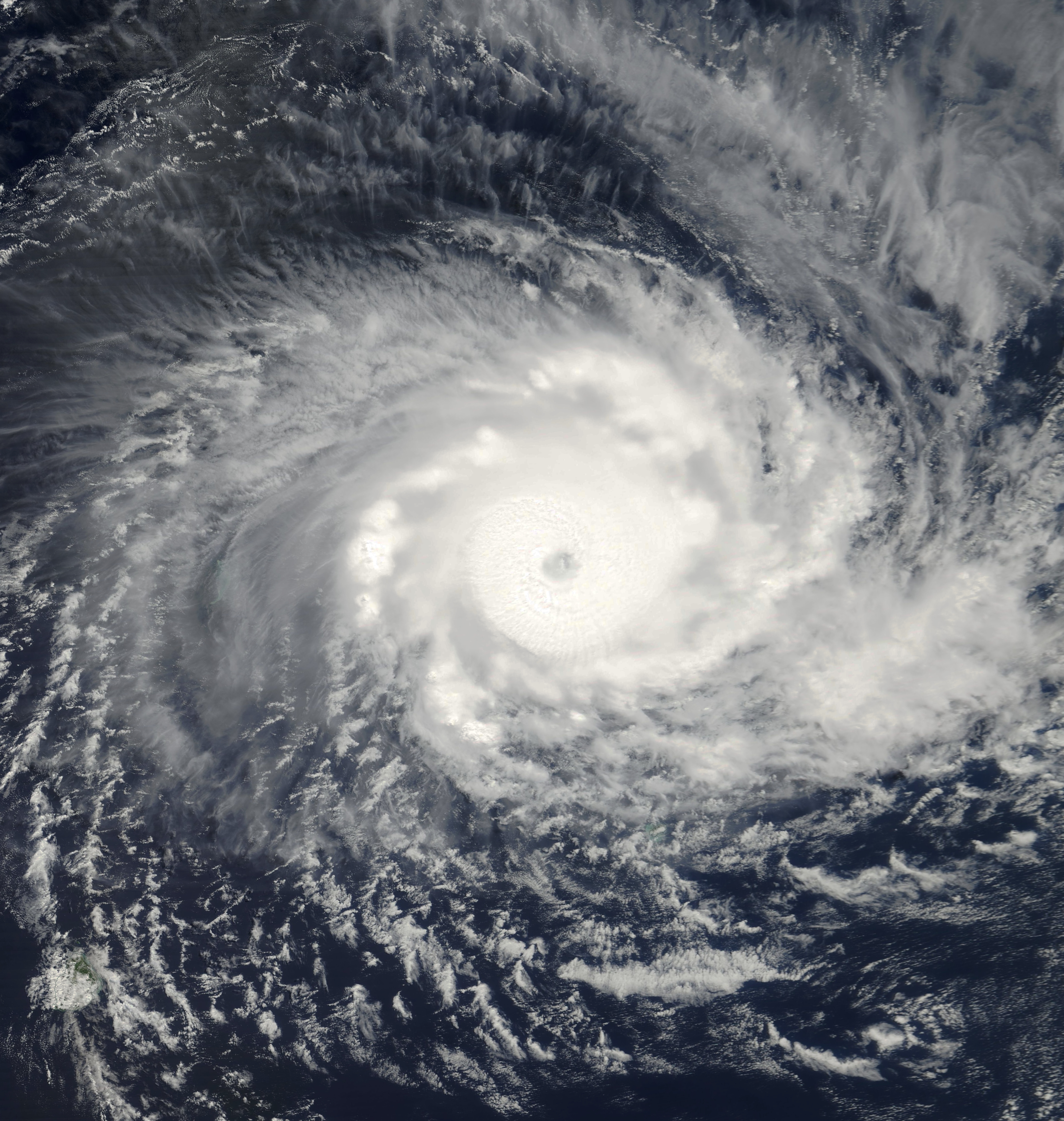
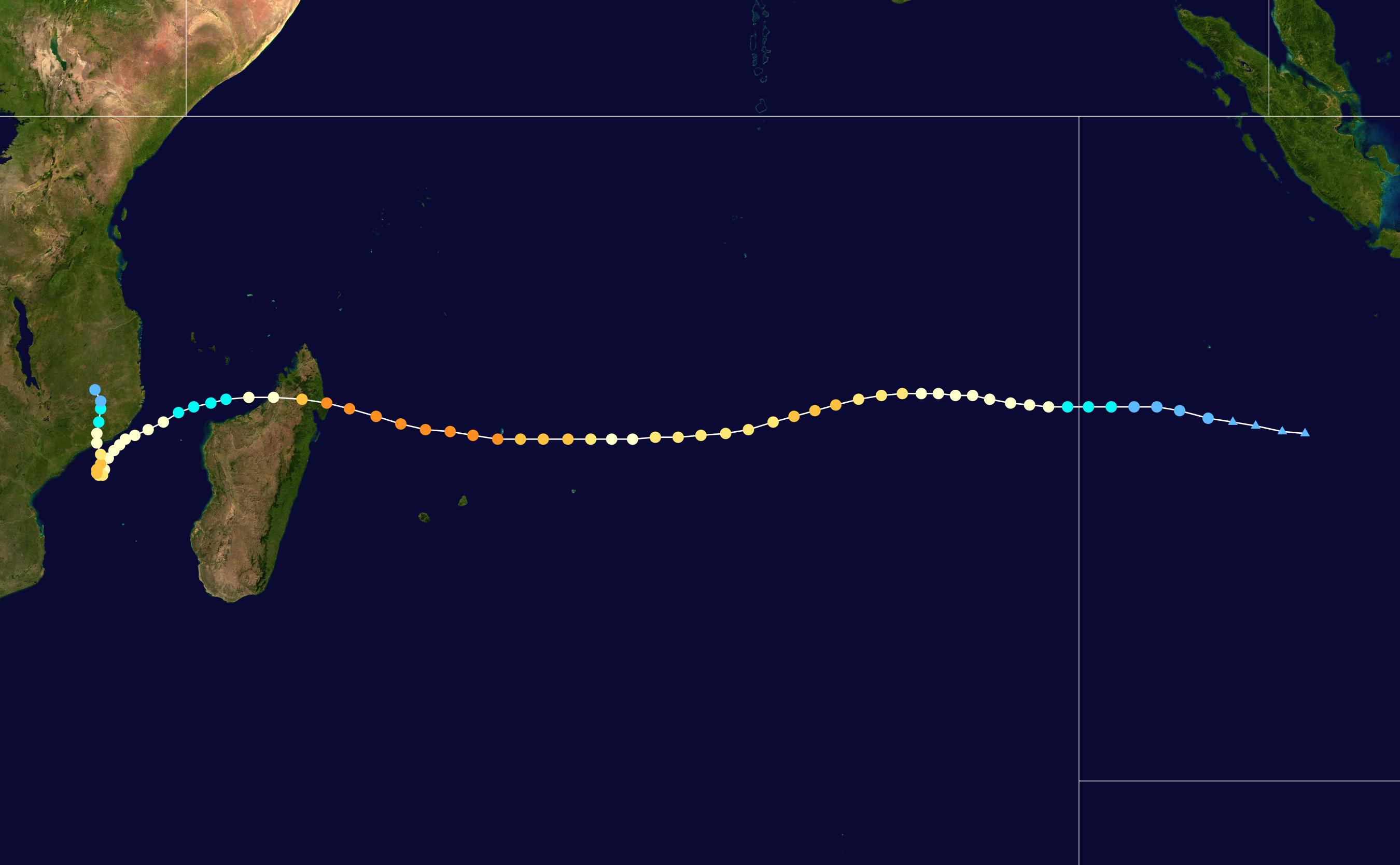
- Duration: March 25 (Enter basin) – April 9
- Peak intensity: 220 km/h (140 mph) (10-min); 905 hPa (mbar)

A tropical low formed in the Australian basin on March 24, moving westward due to a strong subtropical ridge to the south. Despite having intensified enough, the Bureau of Meteorology did not name the system, and on March 25 the system crossed into the South-West Indian Ocean, whereupon it was named Hudah. An eye formed, and the storm intensified into a tropical cyclone on March 27 well to the southeast of Diego Garcia. The structure fluctuated due to dry air, although Hudah was able to intensify steadily on March 31 after conditions became more favorable. The next day, the MFR upgraded it to a very intense tropical cyclone, estimating peak 10‑minute winds of 225 km/h (140 mph). By contrast, the JTWC estimated 1‑minute winds of 235 km/h (146 mph). Cyclone Hudah maintained peak winds until making landfall just southeast of Antalaha, Madagascar on April 2. It weakened greatly over land, but like Eline it re-intensified over the Mozambique Channel. It re-attained tropical cyclone status on April 5 and reached 10‑minute winds of 160 km/h (99 mph) by the time it made landfall on Mozambique near Pebane, Mozambique on April 8. It dissipated by the next day.

While in the vicinity, Hudah brought moderate winds to Rodrigues, St. Brandon, and Tromelin. The cyclone affected the same parts of Madagascar that were previously impacted by Eline and Gloria. Waves reached at least 8 m (26 ft) in height along the coast. The storm was considered the worst to affect the Antalaha region in 20 years, where 90% of homes were destroyed. It was estimated that the storm left at least 100,000 people homeless in Madagascar, and there were 111 deaths. In Mozambique, damage was much less than expected, and the storm affected areas farther north in the country than where Eline struck. Heavy rainfall occurred along the coast, but was insufficient to cause river flooding. Strong winds damaged roofs and downed trees, mostly around Pebane, and the storm killed three people.

=== Subtropical Depression 13 ===
- Subtropical depression (MFR)
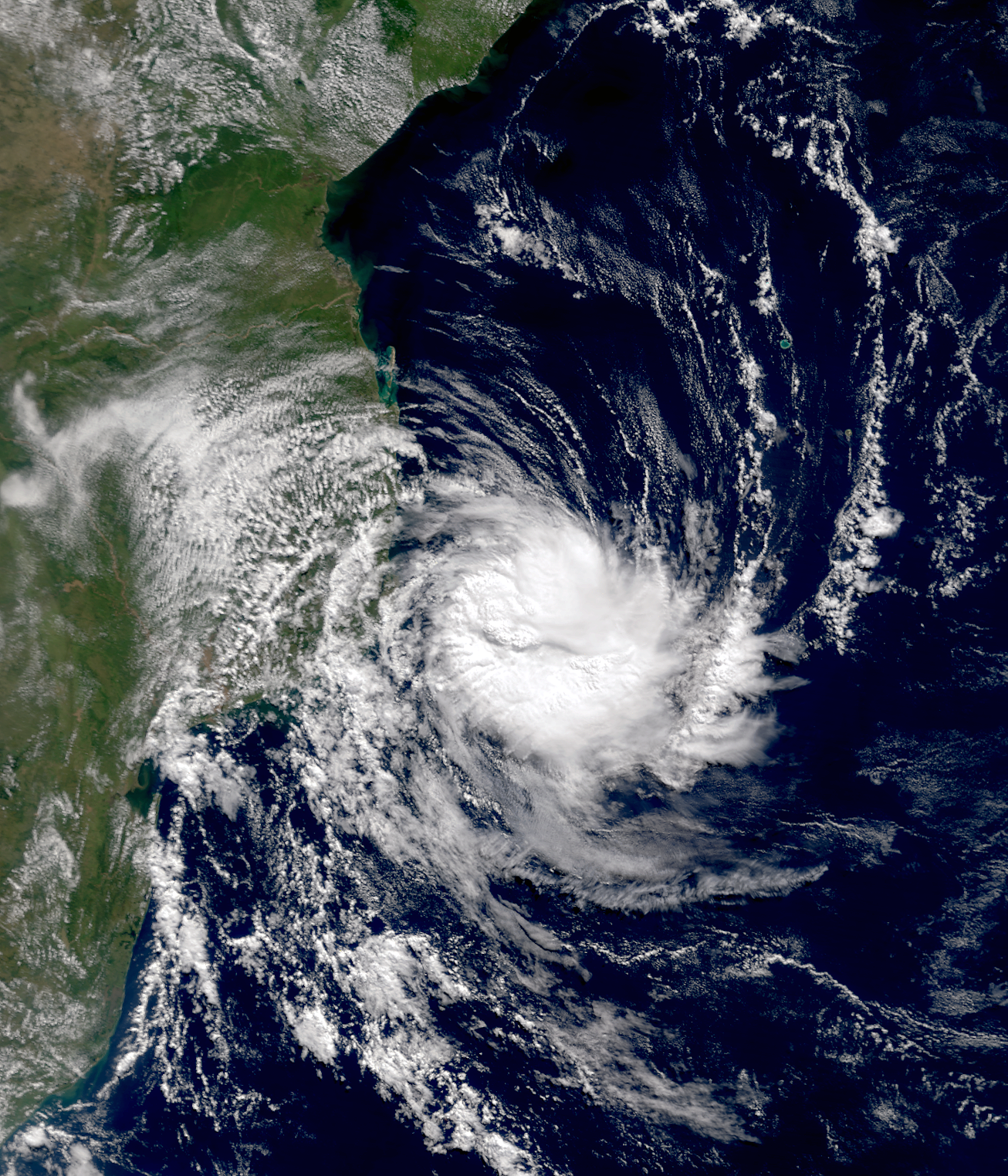
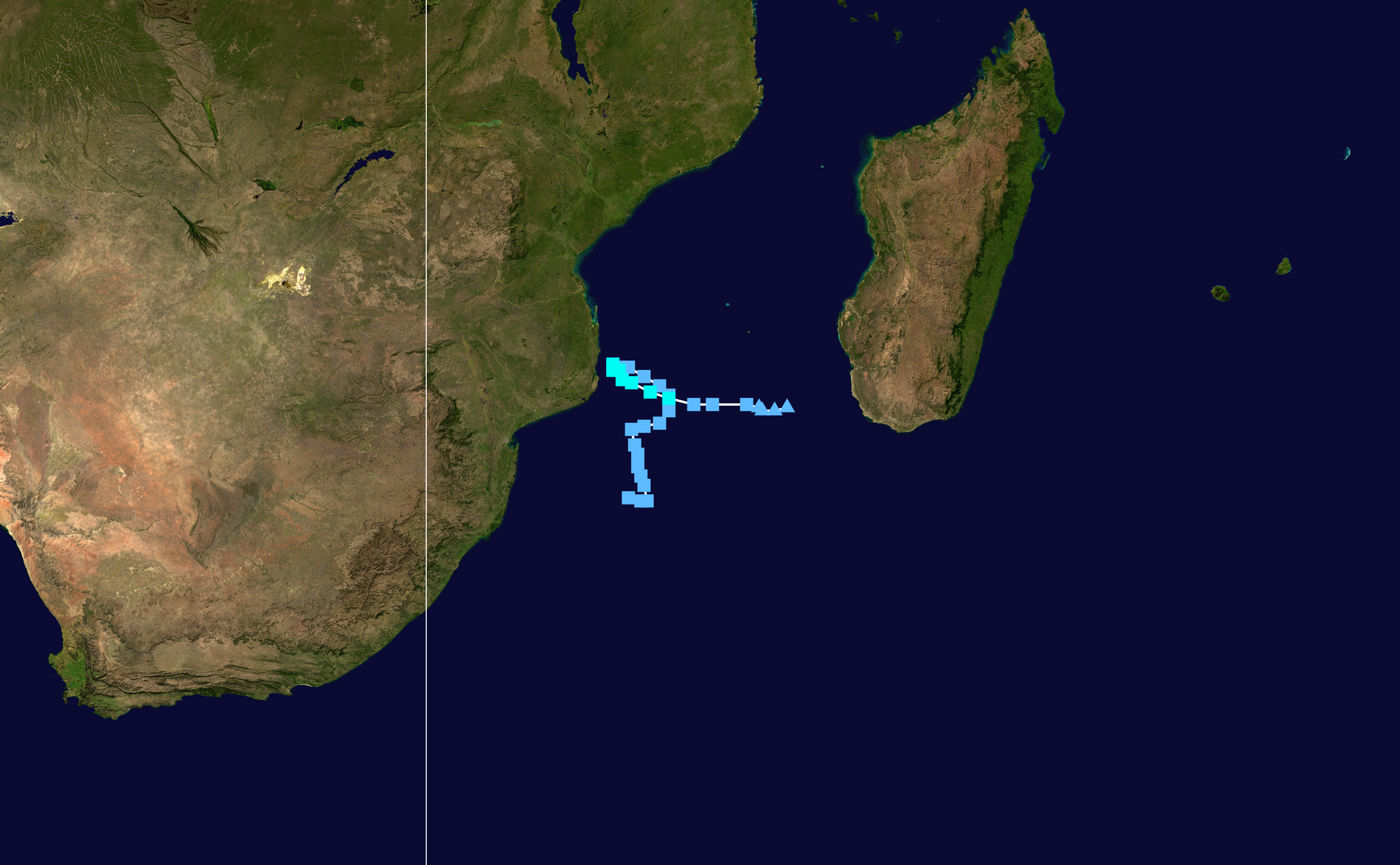
- Duration: April 7 – April 15
- Peak intensity: 95 km/h (60 mph) (10-min); 992 hPa (mbar)

On April 6, a cold front exited the southeast coast of Africa into the Mozambique Channel, producing a small circulation on the next day southeast of Mozambique. On April 7, the system organized into Subtropical Depression 13 and gradually separated from the dissipating cold front. A ridge to the south steered the depression northward as the system became better defined. However, persistent wind shear initially prevented convection from organizing over the center. On April 9, the depression turned northwestward toward Mozambique as thunderstorms increased, aided by a decrease in wind shear through a shift in the jet stream. The center came very close to the Mozambique coast near Inhambane. Due to the small radius of maximum winds, the coastline was spared from strong gusts, although the system dropped 93.8 mm (3.69 in) of rainfall in Inhambane over 48 hours.

The storm turned toward the east on April 11 away from land. Convection organized thereafter into an eye feature, but was weaker than thunderstorms in typical tropical cyclones, resulting in its subtropical classification. The MFR estimated peak 10‑minute winds of 95 km/h (59 mph) on April 12, noting that the system should have been named, but also that its "structure has had no recent analogue in [the basin]." Meanwhile, the JTWC issued three Tropical Cyclone Formation Alerts, but never issued advisories. An increase in wind shear deteriorated the eye feature and the convection, promptly causing weakening. On April 15, the circulation dissipated off the southwest coast of Madagascar.

=== Moderate Tropical Storm Innocente ===
- Moderate tropical storm (MFR)
- Tropical storm (SSHWS)
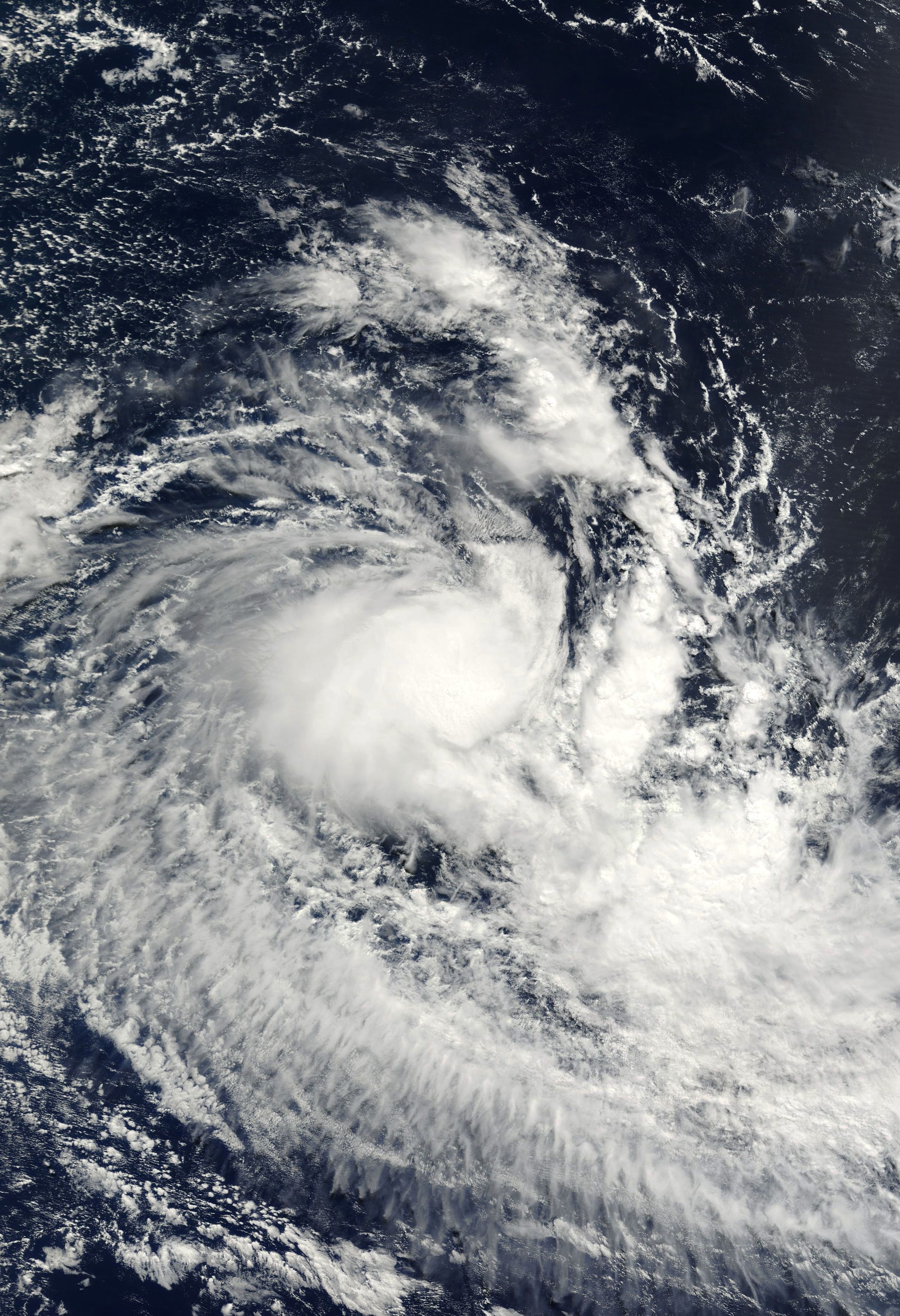
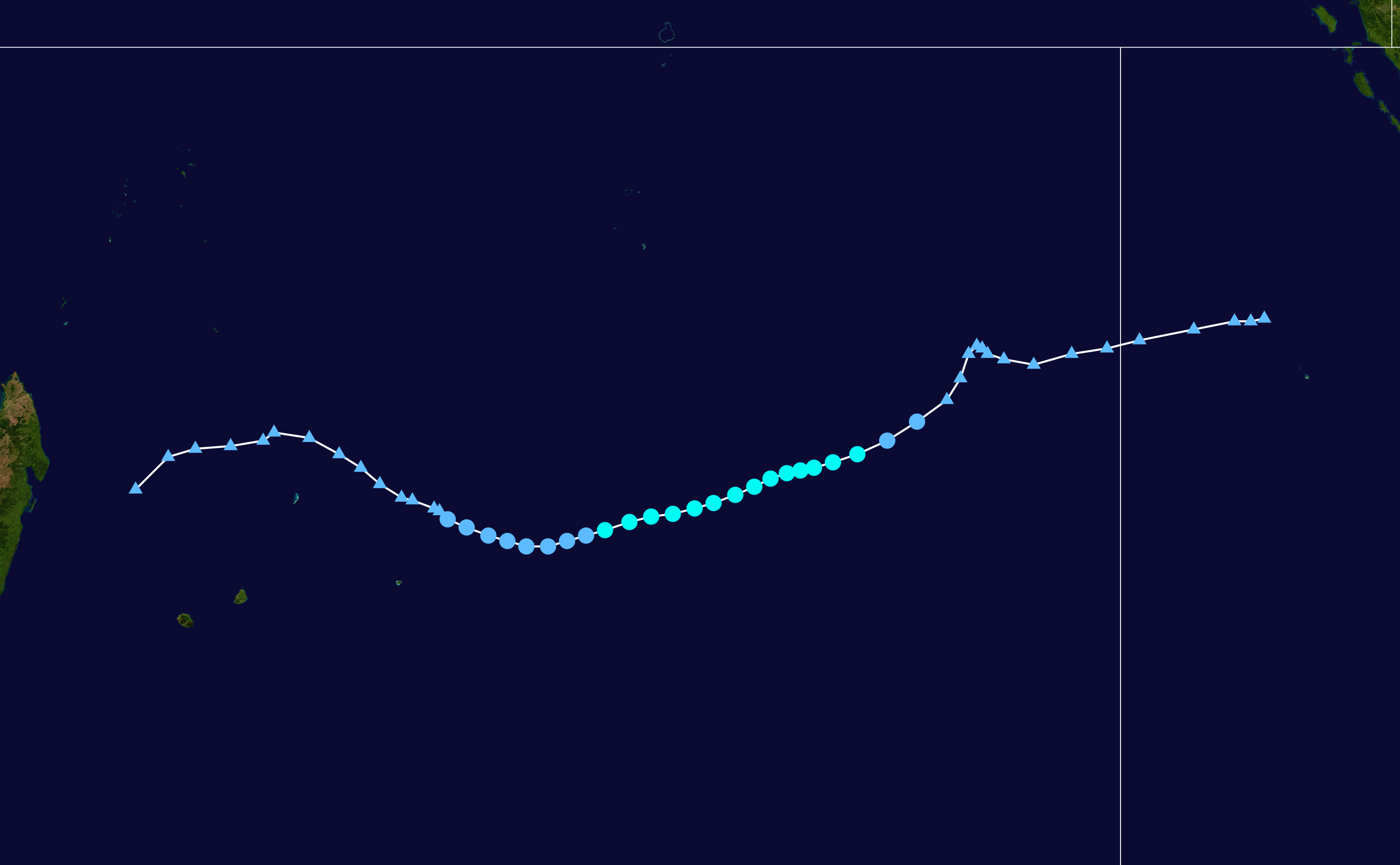
- Duration: April 12 (crossed 90°E) – April 24
- Peak intensity: 70 km/h (45 mph) (10-min); 993 hPa (mbar)

The final storm of the year had its origins in the Australian basin. An area of convection persisted on April 8 to the southwest of Indonesia, developing a distinct center two days later while moving to the west. However, the thunderstorms were unable to organize due to wind shear. On April 11, the MFR estimated that the system became a tropical disturbance, although since it was east of 90° E the agency did not issue advisories at that time. On the next day, the system crossed into the basin and was classified as Tropical Disturbance 14. Over the next few days, the convection waxed and waned, with the strongest winds in the northern periphery. On April 14, the JTWC began tracking the system as Tropical Cyclone 26S. The disturbance maintained a general west-southwest trajectory, influenced by a ridge to the south. After slowing down and encountering a more favorable environment, the system intensified into Moderate Tropical Storm Innocente on April 17, reaching peak 10‑minute winds of 70 km/h (43 mph). Operationally, the MFR upgraded Innocente to storm status a day earlier, only to downgrade and re-upgrade; it was maintained as a depression during this time. The return of wind shear again caused weakening, beginning on April 18. A weak circulation persisted for several days, turning to the northwest with brief increases in thunderstorms. On April 24, Innocente dissipated, although the circulation drew moisture from the south to produce heavy rainfall on Mauritius, peaking at around 400 mm (16 in).

=== Other systems ===
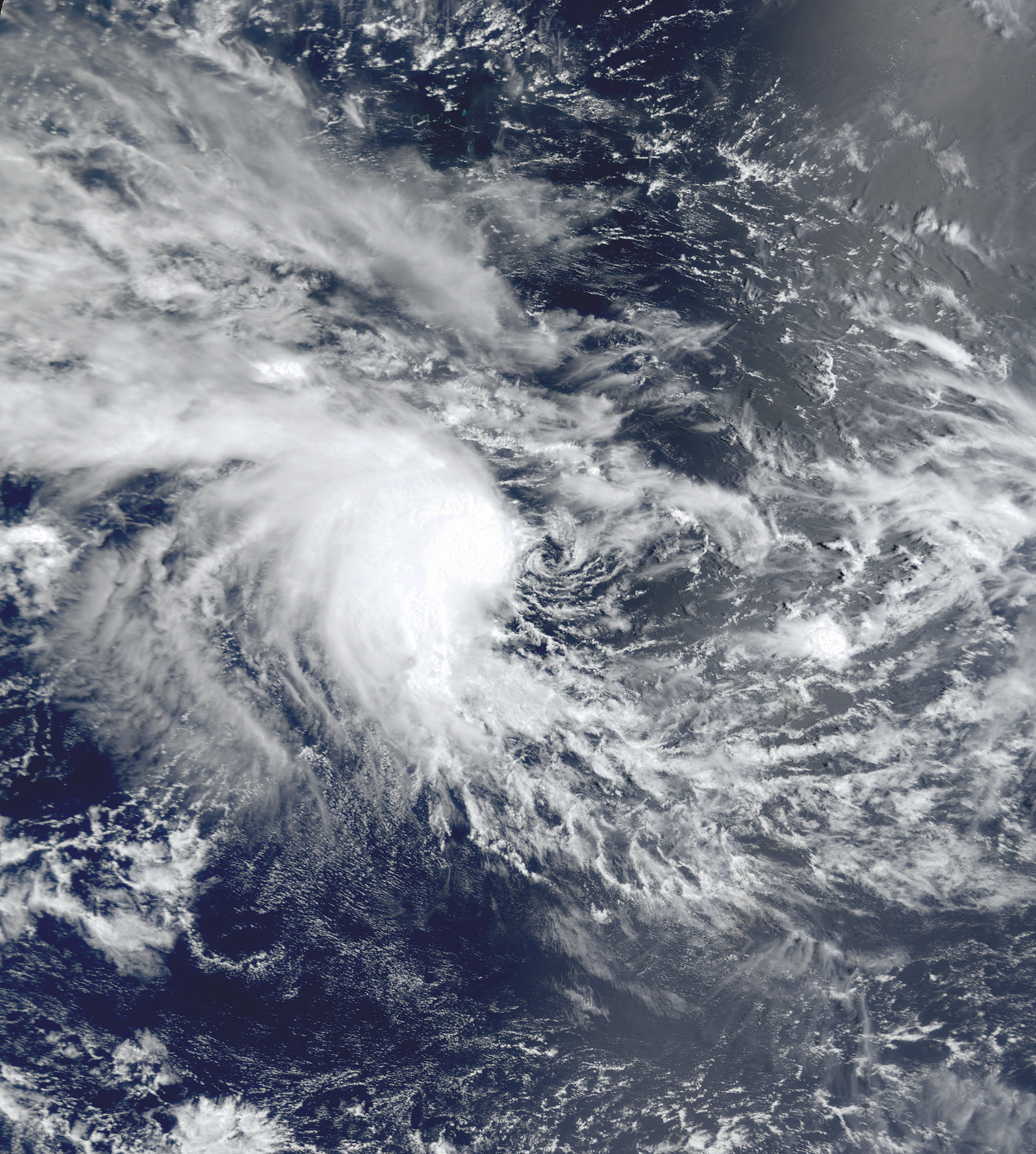
Satellite image of long-tracked tropical depression in March

Throughout the latter half of January, thunderstorms persisted in the Mozambique Channel. On January 12, the MFR classified an area of convection as Tropical Disturbance 3, although the agency ceased issuing advisories on the next day. Convection persisted, with an associated exposed circulation as of January 22. Two days later, the MFR issued one bulletin on the system before dropping advisories. The JTWC tracked the system as an area of potential development until January 26, when the thunderstorms weakened. The disturbance brought heavy rainfall to southwestern Madagascar, which followed a prolonged drought. In Morombe, rainfall over 36 hours accumulated to the average yearly total. This caused flooding and damage to crops and preceded devastating flooding that affected the nation over the subsequent months.

Toward the end of February, the ITCZ produced a large area of convection in the eastern portion of the basin which would spawn two disturbances. On February 29, Tropical Disturbance 9 formed within the system well to the southeast of Diego Garcia. The convection organized slightly despite easterly wind shear, which left the circulation exposed. On March 1, the JTWC classified it as Tropical Cyclone 17S, estimating winds of tropical storm force the next day. The MFR, by contrast, classified it as a tropical depression while moving generally southwestward. The convection weakened on March 3 due to the wind shear, and the circulation steered more to the west-northwest. After nearly dissipating on March 5, the thunderstorms reorganized, possibly due to influence from the monsoon. It turned back to the east, possibly due to interaction with the approaching Cyclone Norman in the Australian basin. Convection soon after diminished over the depression, and the system dissipated on March 11 near 90°E.

On March 1, Tropical Disturbance 10 formed within the same system that spawned the previous depression, only farther to the west. It also encountered wind shear, preventing much intensification. The system remained nearly stationary and failed to organize more. The MFR issued its last advisory on March 3. The MFR also issued bulletins on Norman as Tropical Disturbance 11, which briefly entered the basin on March 10 before dissipating.

== Storm names ==
A tropical disturbance is named when it reaches moderate tropical storm strength. If a tropical disturbance reaches moderate tropical storm status west of 55°E, then the Sub-regional Tropical Cyclone Advisory Centre in Madagascar assigns the appropriate name to the storm. If a tropical disturbance reaches moderate tropical storm status between 55°E and 90°E, then the Sub-regional Tropical Cyclone Advisory Centre in Mauritius assigns the appropriate name to the storm. A new annual list is used every year so no names are retired.

This was the last season to feature all-female names in the basin (although the name Terrence is typically a male given name).

- Astride
- Babiola
- Connie
- Damienne
- Eline
- Felicia
- Gloria
- Hudah
- Innocente
- Jonna (unused)
- Kenetha (unused)
- Lisanne (unused)
- Maizy (unused)
- Nella (unused)
- Ortensia (unused)
- Priscilla (unused)
- Rebecca (unused)
- Sophia (unused)
- Terrence (unused)
- Victorine (unused)
- Wilna (unused)
- Yanselma (unused)

== Season effects ==
| Name | Dates | Peak intensity | | | Areas affected | Damage (USD) | Deaths | Ref(s). |
| Name | Dates | Category | Wind speed | Pressure | Areas affected | Damage (USD) | Deaths | Ref(s). |
|---|---|---|---|---|---|---|---|---|
| Astride | December 23 – January 4 | Severe tropical storm | 95 km/h (60 mph) | 985 hPa (29.09 inHg) | Réunion, Mozambique, Madagascar, Mauritius, Rodrigues | None | None | |
| Babiola | January 3 – 12 | Tropical cyclone | 155 km/h (100 mph) | 950 hPa (28.05 inHg) | Île Amsterdam | None | None | |
| 03 | January 12–26 | Tropical Disturbance | Not specified | Unknown | Madagascar | Unknown | Unknown | |
| Connie | January 25–February 1 | Intense tropical cyclone | 185 km/h (115 mph) | 930 hPa (27.46 inHg) | Mauritius, Réunion, Southern Africa | Unknown | 3 | |
| Damienne | January 30 – February 7 | Moderate tropical storm | 65 km/h (40 mph) | 994 hPa (29.35 inHg) | None | None | None | |
| Eline | February 8–February 29 | Intense tropical cyclone | 185 km/h (115 mph) | 930 hPa (27.46 inHg) | Mauritius, Réunion, Rodrigues, Madagascar, Mozambique, South Africa, Swaziland, Malawi, Botswana, Namibia | >$309 million | 114-722 | (Note: In Madagascar, Eline killed at least 64 people, although subsequent Tropical Storm Gloria affected the same region just two weeks later. The death toll for both storms is 205, with 66 confirmed fatalities related to Gloria, resulting in 139 deaths potentially related to Eline. There were only 17 confirmed fatalities in Mozambique, although the death toll from the cyclone and preceding floods was around 700, with 150 deaths before Eline's arrival. Therefore, there are up to 550 deaths related to the storm in that country. Elsewhere, Eline killed 12 people in Zimbabwe and 21 in South Africa.) |
| 07 | February 29–March 11 | Tropical depression | Not specified | Unknown | None | None | None | |
| Felicia | February 18 – February 24 | Severe tropical cyclone | 110 km/h (70 mph) | 975 hPa (28.79 inHg) | None | None | None | |
| Gloria | February 27–March 10 | Severe tropical storm | 95 km/h (60 mph) | 985 hPa (29.09 inHg) | St. Brandon, Tromelin Island, Madagascar, Mozambique | Unknown | 66 | (Note: Gloria killed at least 66 people, although the exact toll was initially unknown due to disrupted communications.) |
| 10 | March 1–March 3 | Tropical depression | Not specified | Unknown | None | None | None | |
| 11 | March 10 | Tropical disturbance | Not specified | Unknown | None | None | None | |
| Hudah | March 25–April 9 | Very intense tropical cyclone | 220 km/h (140 mph) | 905 hPa (26.72 inHg) | St. Brandon, Tromelin Island, Rodrigues, Madagascar, Mozambique | Unknown | 114 | |
| 13 | April 7–April 15 | Subtropical depression | 95 km/h (60 mph) | 992 hPa (29.29 inHg) | Mozambique | None | None | |
| Innocente | April 12–April 24 | Moderate tropical storm | 70 km/h (45 mph) | 993 hPa (29.32 inHg) | Mauritius | None | None | |
Season aggregates
| 14 systems | 23 December – 24 April | | 220 km/h (140 mph) | 905 hPa (26.72 inHg) | | > $309 million | > 1,019 | |

== See also ==
- 2018–19 South-West Indian Ocean cyclone season – The deadliest cyclone season in the South-West Indian Ocean, which saw Cyclone Idai devastate the countries in southern Africa east of the Mozambique Channel
- List of Southern Hemisphere tropical cyclone seasons
- Atlantic hurricane seasons: 1999, 2000
- Pacific hurricane seasons: 1999, 2000
- Pacific typhoon seasons: 1999, 2000
- North Indian Ocean cyclone seasons: 1999, 2000
