= FMSR =

FMSR may refer to

- Distribution Management System#Fault Management & System Restoration (FMSR)
- Federated Malay States Railways
- Morombe Airport, ICAO code FMSR
