= Martin Rafidison =

Malagasy politician

Martin Rafidison was a Malagasy politician. A member of the National Assembly of Madagascar, he was elected as a member of the Tiako I Madagasikara party; he represented the constituency of Morombe.
