= Early 2000 Madagascar floods =

Multiple floods in 2000 in Madagascar

March 2000 Madagascar floods
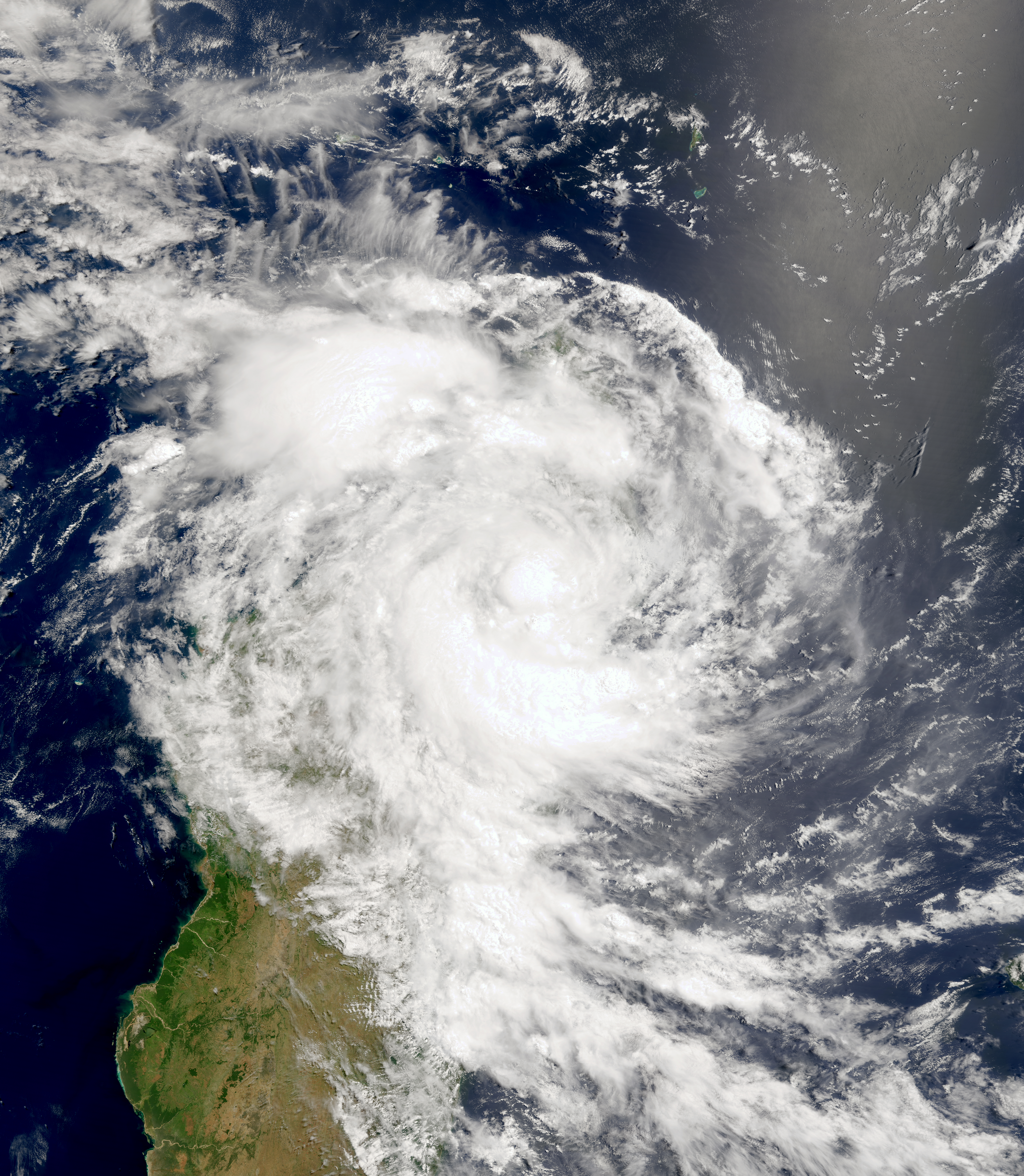
- Satellite image of Tropical Storm Gloria near landfall
- Date: February–March 2000
- Location: Central and northern Madagascar
- Deaths: 205 total
- Property damage: >$9 million (2000 USD)

In early 2000, severe flooding occurred in the African nation of Madagascar after Cyclone Leon–Eline and Severe Tropical Storm Gloria struck the nation within a two-week period. The first storm, Eline, formed on February 1, and took an extended track across the Indian Ocean, eventually making landfall near Mahanoro on February 17. On March 1, Gloria struck northeastern Madagascar, and like Eline, moved southwestward across the country.

== Meteorological history ==
Ahead of the primary flooding in February 2000, a tropical disturbance persisted off the west coast of Madagascar in January. Rains from the system helped end previous drought conditions, while also causing flooding and damage. In Morombe, precipitation from the system reached the equivalence of the annual rainfall in just 36 hours.

On February 1, a low-pressure area formed within the monsoon trough to the south of Indonesia, which would eventually become Tropical Cyclone Leon. The storm tracked westward across much of the Indian Ocean, fluctuating in strength due to changes in the atmosphere. After crossing 90° E, the Météo-France (MFR) (Note: The Météo-France office in Réunion is the official Regional Specialized Meteorological Center for the basin.) began tracking the system as Tropical Storm Eline. The storm continued westward across the Indian Ocean and intensified greatly as it approached the east coast of Madagascar. Late on February 17, Eline made landfall near Mahanoro, with 10 minute maximum sustained winds of 165 km/h (105 mph) according to the MFR. The storm rapidly weakened over land, but eventually restrengthened in the Mozambique Channel to make another damaging landfall in Mozambique. Eline dropped heavy rainfall in Madagascar, with a 24‑hour total of 131 mm (5.2 in) at Ivato International Airport near the capital Antananarivo. The rains also caused flooding along Madagascar's west coast, which is usually spared from precipitation by mountains. Eline struck while Madagascar was in the midst of a cholera epidemic that had killed over 1,000 people.

While Eline was dissipating over southern Africa, another area of disturbed weather formed to the northeast of Madagascar, becoming a tropical disturbance on February 27. Moving generally westward toward the country, it intensified into Tropical Storm Gloria on March 1. Later that day, the MFR estimated that the storm reached peak 10 minute winds of 95 km/h (60 mph), before Gloria made landfall about 10 km (6 mi) north of Sambava. The storm moved southwestward across the country, gradually weakening and eventually moving into the Mozambique Channel. Gloria brought additional heavy rainfall to Madagascar, with Mananjary reporting a two-day total of 427 mm (16.8 in). Nosy Be along the northwest coast recorded a 24‑hour rainfall total of 165 mm (6.5 in), which is over half the average monthly precipitation. Mananjary reported a two-day total of 427 mm (16.8 in). Later, Gloria produced sporadic rainfall in southern Madagascar, in part due to increased humidity.

== Impact ==
The rains from Gloria occurred less than two weeks after Cyclone Leon–Eline struck the country, bringing additional flooding, landslides, and damage. In the area where Gloria moved ashore, several communities were temporarily isolated due to the flooding. In Sambava, near where Gloria moved ashore, the storm killed 18 people, destroyed hundreds of homes, and damaged a road connecting the area to the capital of Madagascar, Antananarivo. Across the region, the floods destroyed at least 30 bridges, many of them wooden, and damaged 100 km (60 mi) of roads. In the region around Vatomandry, where Eline made landfall, 65% of houses were damaged, 90% of crops were lost, and 75% of health facilities were wrecked; about 10,000 people there were left homeless. The floods also affected the west coast of Madagascar. In Morombe along the southwest coast, about one-third of buildings were destroyed and many others were damaged, with 1,600 people left homeless in that area. The west coast is usually unaffected by cyclones striking from the east coast, which left several communities unprepared.

Fields were inundated for over a week, causing severe losses to coffee and banana crops. Thousands of hectares of rice paddy fields were flooded. The flooding destroyed many cash crops, thus depriving a poor region with a source of income, as well as threatening food supply. Floods from the two storm inundated 70% of homes and wrecked 70% of the crops in the districts of Andapa, Sambava, Antalaha, and Vohemar. Up to half of the rice harvest in the country was lost during the floods. About 12,000 people were isolated by floods in 114 villages. Overall, about 700,000 people were directly impacted by the floods. Collectively, 12,230 people were left without access to clean water.

The government of Madagascar reported that cyclones Eline and Gloria killed 64 and 66 people, respectively, although the exact toll was initially unknown due to disrupted communications. Cyclone Gloria alone killed 40 people at Andapa. Overall, at least 205 people were killed. Damage from Eline alone was estimated at $9 million (USD).

== Aftermath ==
Immediately after Eline struck Madagascar, the government began distributing relief items, such as rice, tents, and sheets. On February 21, survey flights helped indicate the extent of damage across the nation. Supplies were distributed by road from Antananarivo to the worst affected areas, with helicopters dropping off aid to isolated communities. However, inadequate transportation network, residual flooding, and landslides caused difficulties in distributing aid. In addition, many of the affected residents were in remote regions of the country, further complicating relief efforts. By the middle of March 2000, flooding had largely receded, leaving behind mud and dead animals along roads and fields. However, about 60,000 people in northeastern Madagascar remained isolated as of March 17. Road access was gradually restored to the hardest hit areas, allowing relief distribution to shift from air to land more. The Fianarantsoa-Côte Est railway, damaged during the storm, took three months to be reopened. The lack of road or rail prevented farmers from selling crops that hadn't been destroyed during the storms. By March 21, the situation was no longer life-threatening, although food distribution was still required due to the ruined rice harvest. Costs for rice in some parts of the country doubled due to the flooding. In addition, houses were gradually rebuilt. On April 2, around a month after Gloria struck Madagascar, Cyclone Hudah also struck the country, causing an additional 111 deaths and heavy damage.

The floods caused outbreaks of malaria and cholera while also decreasing food supplies. In the month after Eline struck, 384 people died due to cholera, representing a 39% increase in the death toll in that time period, after there were 22,000 new cases of the disease. However, officials in the country stated the increase was not due to the storms' flooding, but rather from poor hygiene conditions and the start of the rainy season. In addition, the Malagasy government prevented foreign non-governmental organizations from treating cholera patients, causing Médecins Sans Frontières to leave the country in late February.

Due to the combined impacts of Eline and Gloria, the government of Madagascar requested for international assistance on March 7, which was coordinated through the United Nations Office for the Coordination of Humanitarian Affairs. The government believed that the flooding in Mozambique, also caused by Eline, was receiving more international attention, and sought more assistance. On March 12, then-Prime Minister Tantely Andrianarivo flew over the northeast portion of the country to survey the damage, as well as hold a religious ceremony for the storm victims.

After receiving request from the Malagasy government, UNICEF flew 15 tons of supplies from Copenhagen, such as medicine, 10.5 tons of food, and equipment to help coordinate relief work. The agency also transported thousands of blankets and water purification tablets from Antananarivo. However, UNICEF faced difficulties in distributing the supplies. The government of the United Kingdom donated £1.3 million to Madagascar. The World Food Programme flew about 400 tons of food to affected residents across the country, and Médecins Sans Frontières sent about 35 tons of supplies, such as medicine, water purifying devices, and food. The Organisation of African Unity donated $200,000 to Madagascar on March 10, and five days later, the African Development Bank approved a $500,000 grant to the country. Beginning on March 13, the French cruiser Jeanne d'Arc (R97) began sending six helicopters to drop off 27 tons' worth of aid. The Netherlands Red Cross donated 40 tons of supplies, including medical kits, blankets, and plastic sheets. For the 2001 fiscal year, the United States Agency for International Development provided $14 million (USD) to Madagascar, mostly toward rebuilding damaged roads and ports.

== See also ==
- Tropical Cyclone Josie - weak tropical storm that struck northern Madagascar about two weeks after another powerful cyclone – Gretelle – struck the nation
