= Morombe Airport =

Airport in Madagascar

- IATA: MXM; ICAO: FMSR

Summary
- Airport type: Public
- Operator: ADEMA (Aéroports de Madagascar)
- Serves: Morombe
- Location: Atsimo-Andrefana, Madagascar
- Elevation AMSL: 16 ft / 5 m
- Coordinates: 21°45′14″S 43°22′31″E

Map
- Location within Madagascar

Runways
Direction	Length		Surface
Direction	ft	m	Surface
04/22	4,265	1,300	Asphalt
- DAFIF

Morombe Airport is an airport in Morombe, Madagascar (IATA: MXM, ICAO: FMSR).
