= Morombe =

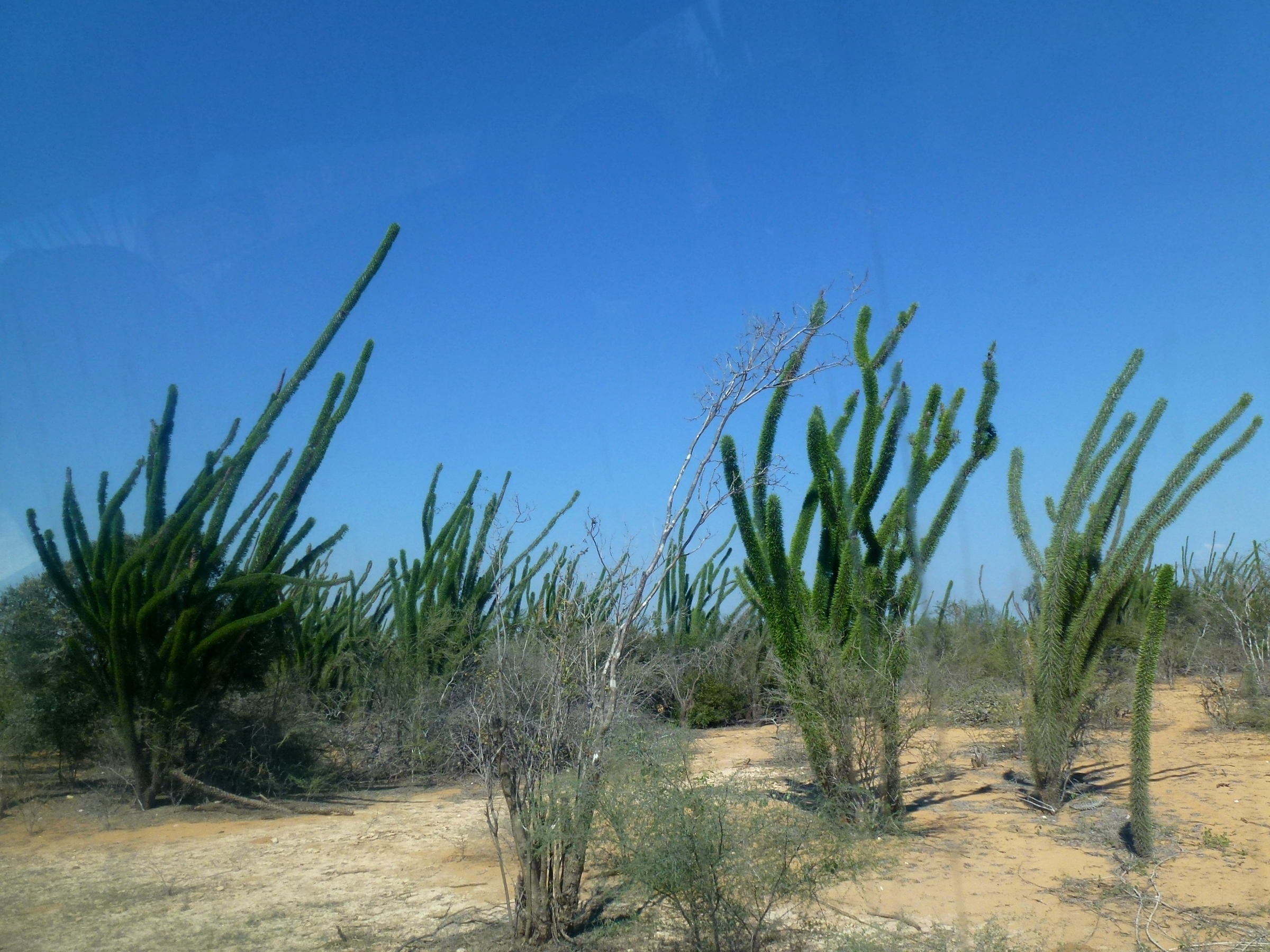
- a Didierea in Andombiry, Morombe

- Location in Madagascar
- Coordinates: 21°45′S 43°22′E
- Country: Madagascar
- Region: Atsimo-Andrefana
- District: Morombe

Government
  - Mayor: Adolphe Faralahy
- Elevation: 7 m (23 ft)

Population (2018)Census
  - Total: 22,625
  - Ethnicities: Vezo
- Time zone: UTC3 (EAT)
- Postal code: 618

Morombe is an urban municipality (commune urbaine) on the south-west coast in Atsimo-Andrefana, Madagascar. It can be reached by the National road 55 or pirogue from Morondava. It is situated at 283 km from Tulear.

An airport serves the town.

== Television ==
For 17 years now there is no television available in Morombe. At the time the transmitter broke down, the director took it to Tulear and later to Antananarivo but it was never returned.

== Baobab d'Andombiro ==
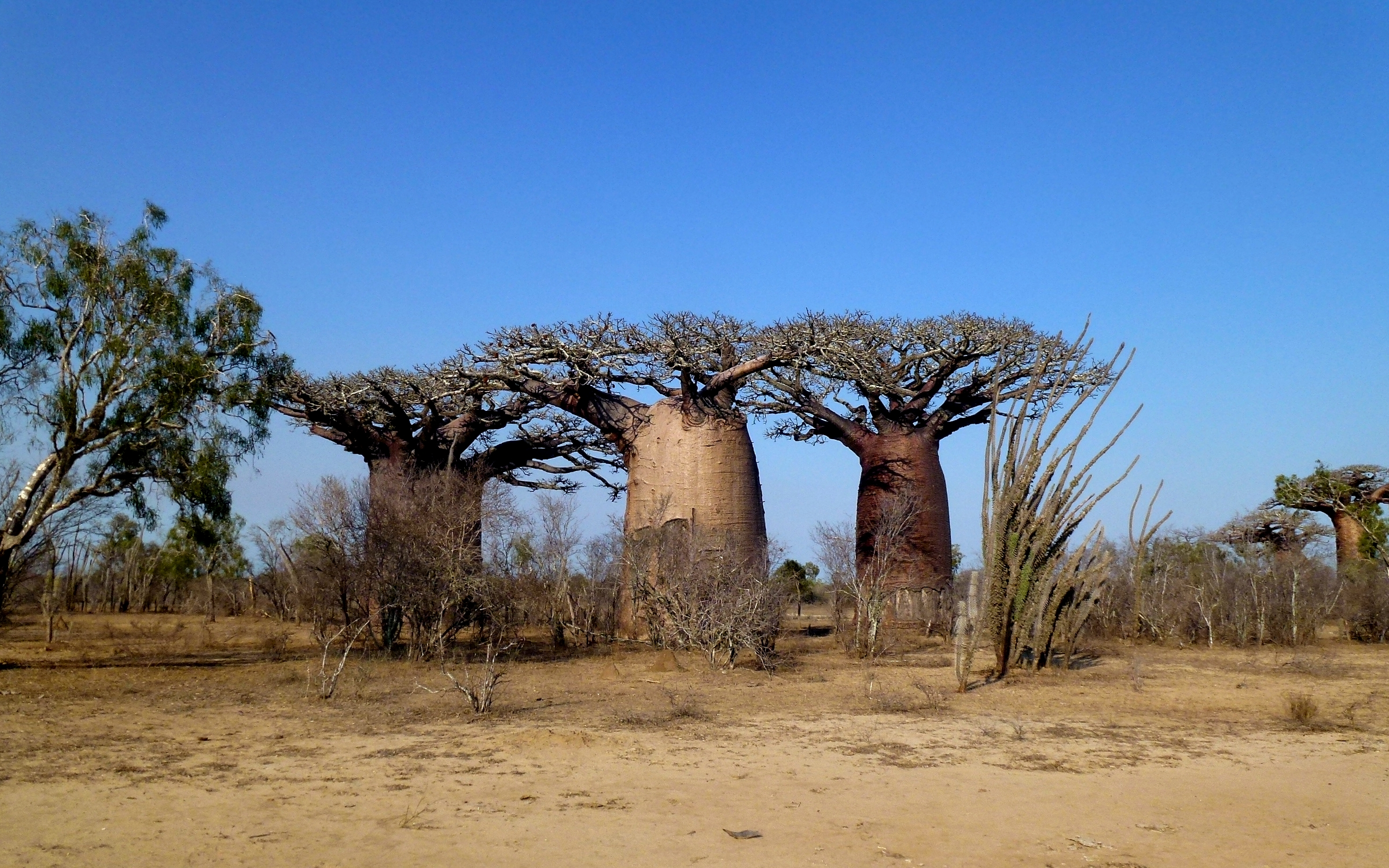
Three Brothers Baobab in Andombiry, Morombe

The largest baobab in this world is found in the village of Belintsaka, 23 kilometres or 14 miles from Morombe. It has a circumference of almost 28 metres or 92 feet. There are more than 6000 adult baobabs alone in the forest of Andombiry of which 30 specimen are very large, with a circumference of more than 20 metres or 66 feet.

== Climate ==
Morombe has a hot semi-arid climate (Köppen BSh) with a short and highly variable wet season in January and February. These two months account for about 70 percent of an annual rainfall that averages around 450 millimetres or 18 inches, although during the 2000 floods that amount fell in just 36 hours. On February 8, 1941, an extremely severe wind event later confirmed to have been a strong tornado, leveled the entire town.

Climate data for Morombe (1991–2020)
Month	Jan	Feb	Mar	Apr	May	Jun	Jul	Aug	Sep	Oct	Nov	Dec	Year
Record high °C (°F)	35.6 (96.1)	35.8 (96.4)	34.9 (94.8)	34.9 (94.8)	34.5 (94.1)	34.1 (93.4)	33.3 (91.9)	34.9 (94.8)	35.8 (96.4)	35.8 (96.4)	35.7 (96.3)	35.8 (96.4)	35.8 (96.4)
Mean daily maximum °C (°F)	30.7 (87.3)	30.7 (87.3)	31.0 (87.8)	30.4 (86.7)	29.0 (84.2)	28.0 (82.4)	27.3 (81.1)	27.6 (81.7)	28.6 (83.5)	29.6 (85.3)	30.0 (86.0)	30.4 (86.7)	29.4 (84.9)
Daily mean °C (°F)	27.9 (82.2)	27.8 (82.0)	27.8 (82.0)	26.6 (79.9)	24.7 (76.5)	23.2 (73.8)	22.4 (72.3)	23.2 (73.8)	24.3 (75.7)	25.7 (78.3)	26.9 (80.4)	27.7 (81.9)	25.7 (78.3)
Mean daily minimum °C (°F)	25.0 (77.0)	24.8 (76.6)	24.5 (76.1)	22.7 (72.9)	20.4 (68.7)	18.3 (64.9)	17.5 (63.5)	18.7 (65.7)	19.9 (67.8)	21.8 (71.2)	23.7 (74.7)	24.8 (76.6)	21.8 (71.2)
Record low °C (°F)	18.2 (64.8)	17.2 (63.0)	16.2 (61.2)	14.5 (58.1)	12.4 (54.3)	10.0 (50.0)	7.9 (46.2)	10.0 (50.0)	10.6 (51.1)	13.4 (56.1)	14.7 (58.5)	17.0 (62.6)	7.9 (46.2)
Average precipitation mm (inches)	207.4 (8.17)	118.7 (4.67)	47.6 (1.87)	13.0 (0.51)	3.3 (0.13)	3.0 (0.12)	1.9 (0.07)	1.9 (0.07)	4.1 (0.16)	5.5 (0.22)	14.7 (0.58)	29.5 (1.16)	450.6 (17.74)
Average precipitation days (≥ 1.0 mm)	8.3	6.1	3.0	1.1	0.6	0.5	0.3	0.3	0.4	0.5	0.7	2.9	24.7
Source: NOAA

== See also ==
- Morondava
- Kirindy Mitea National Park
- Mikea Forest
- Roman Catholic Diocese of Morombe
