= Ilaka Est =

Ilaka Est Ilaka Atsinanana
- Location in Madagascar
- Coordinates: 19°33′11″S 48°50′27″E
- Country: Madagascar
- Region: Atsinanana
- District: Vatomandry (district)
- Elevation: 20 m (66 ft)

Population (2019)
  - Total: 17,120
- Time zone: UTC3 (EAT)
- postal code: 517

Ilaka Est (Ilaka Atsinanana) is a rural municipality located in the Atsinanana region of eastern Madagascar, and belongs to the Vatomandry (district).

This town is situated on the eastern coast of Madagascar, in the southern part of Atsinanana, on the banks of the Manampotsy river and is located on the National road 11a. Also its affluent, the Mahasana river, crosses the municipality. Also the Canal des Pangalanes passes the municipality.

The economy is based on agriculture, including coffee and cacao but also rice, maize and manioc.

== Roads ==
Ilaka Atsinanana is situated at the National Road 11a halfway between Vatomandry (40 km) and Mahanoro (47 km).

== Religion ==
There are 4 churches but traditional customs and religions are widely practiced.

- FJKM - Fiangonan'i Jesoa Kristy eto Madagasikara (Church of Jesus Christ in Madagascar)
- FLM - Fiangonana Loterana Malagasy (Malagasy Lutheran Church)
- Catholic church
- Fiangonana Jesosy Mamonjy

== Lakes ==
The Vangona Lake.
