= Niarovana Caroline =

- Location in Madagascar
- Coordinates: 19°34′31″S 48°47′53″E
- Country: Madagascar
- Region: Atsinanana
- District: Vatomandry District
- Municipality since: Dec.2012

Area
  - Total: 230 km^{2} (89 sq mi)
- Elevation: 12 m (39 ft)

Population (2019)
  - Total: 10,495
  - Ethnicities: Betsimisaraka (80%) Antemoro (10%)
- Time zone: UTC3 (EAT)
- Postal code: 517

Niarovana Caroline is a small village and rural municipality in the Vatomandry District, Atsinanana Region, Madagascar. The village was founded in 1926 and has become a municipality in December 2012.

It is situated on the National Road RN 11a, 7 km south of Ilaka Est and 47 km south of Vatomandry and the junction of the unpaved RNT 20 to Antanambao Manampotsy (49 km).

== Economy ==
The economy is based on agriculture that employs 81.7% of its population.

== Administration ==
To this municipality belong 10 fokontany (villages). Each of them has an elementary school but Ambalamangahazo with 2. There is only one college (CSB II) in Niarovana Caroline. The school enrollment rate is 54,53%.
