= Maintinandry =

- Location in Madagascar
- Coordinates: 19°25′48″S 48°55′51″E
- Country: Madagascar
- Region: Atsinanana
- District: Vatomandry District

Population (2001)
  - Total: 7,117
- Time zone: UTC3 (EAT)
- Postal code: 517

Maintinandry [vatʷˈmanɖʐʲ] is a small village and commune in the Vatomandry District, Atsinanana Region, Madagascar.

It is located near the coast, along the path of the Canal des Pangalanes, near the mouth of the Sakanila River, and about eight kilometres south of the village of Vatomandry. It is on Route Nationale (RN) 11, though as of 2006 that road is only improved through Vatomandry and the section leading to Maintinandry was described as a "potholed mud track."
