= Vatomandry District =

Vatomandry (district)
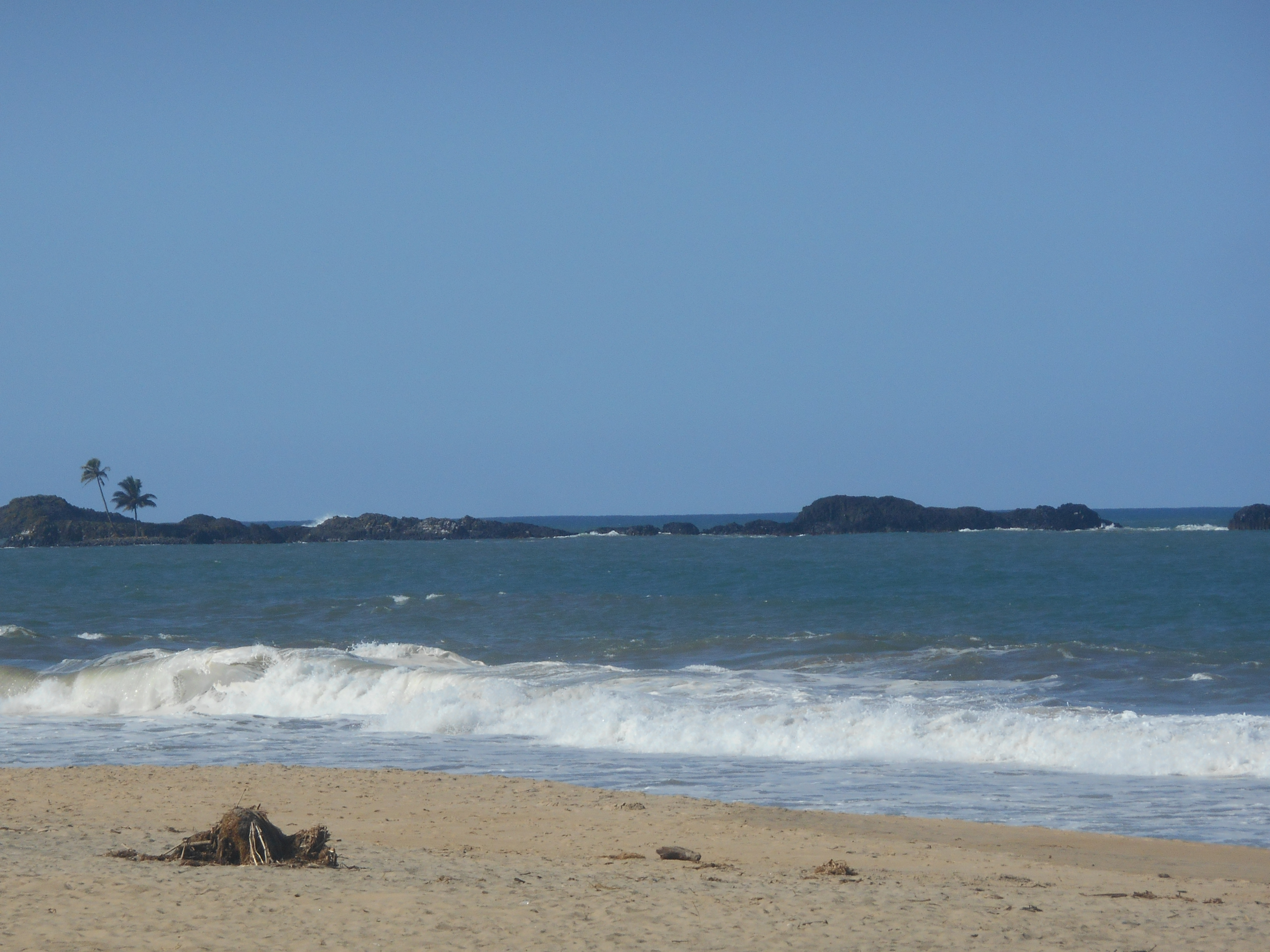
- Vatomandry

- Location in Madagascar
- Coordinates: 19°19′51″S 48°58′41″E
- Country: Madagascar
- Region: Atsinanana
- District: Vatomandry (district)

Population (2019)3ieme recensement
  - Total: 169,861
- Time zone: UTC+3 (EAT)

Vatomandry is a district located in Atsinanana Region, Madagascar.

== Etymology and location ==
Located on the coast, the town's name means 'Sleeping Rocks', derived from two black rocks near the shore. It is also on the path of the Canal des Pangalanes and Route Nationale (RN) 11.

== History ==
In the pre-colonial era of the 19th century, Vatomandry was a center of Hova government with an active port.

Cyclone Manou caused great damage in 2003 to the town and left 68 people dead. Cyclone Giovanna in 2012 also caused significant damage.

== Religion ==
- Roman Catholic Apostolic Prefecture of Vatomandry

== Notable personalities ==
- Didier Ratsiraka (1936-2021), former President of Madagascar

== Communes ==
The district is further divided into 15 communes:

- Ambalavolo
- Amboditavolo
- Ambodivoananto
- Ampasimadinika
- Antanambao Mahatsara
- Ifasina I
- Ifasina II
- Ilaka Est
- Maintinandry
- Niarovana Caroline
- Nierenana
- Sahamatevina
- Tanambao Vahatrakaka
- Tsivangiana
- Vatomandry
