= Ifasina II =

- Location in Madagascar
- Coordinates: 19°19′04″S 48°36′55″E
- Country: Madagascar
- Region: Atsinanana
- District: Vatomandry (district)

Population (2019)census
  - Total: 5 101
  - Ethnicities: Betsimisaraka
- Time zone: UTC3 (EAT)
- postal code: 517

Ifasina II is a rural municipality located in the Vatomandry district of the Atsinanana region of eastern Madagascar.

This town is situated on the eastern coast of Madagascar, in the southern part of Atsinanana, on the Sakanila river.

The Köppen climate type is Af Tropical Rainforest.
