= Ambodinonoka Rangalana =

- Location in Madagascar
- Country: Madagascar
- Region: Atsinanana
- District: Vatomandry District

Population (2019)census
  - Total: 4,455
- Time zone: UTC3 (EAT)
- Postal code: 51

Ambodinonoka Rangalana is a rural municipality located in the Atsinanana region of eastern Madagascar. It belongs to the Vatomandry District.
