= Tsivangiana =

- Location in Madagascar
- Coordinates: 19°29′44″S 48°35′10″E
- Country: Madagascar
- Region: Atsinanana
- District: Vatomandry (district)
- Elevation: 9 m (30 ft)

Population (2019)
  - Total: 10,001
- Time zone: UTC3 (EAT)
- postal code: 517

Tsivangiana is a rural municipality located in the Atsinanana region of eastern Madagascar, and belongs to the Vatomandry (district).

This town is situated on the eastern coast of Madagascar, in the southern part of Atsinanana and is located on the National road 11a.

The economy is based on agriculture, including coffee and cacao but also rice, mais and manioc are grown.
