= Amboditavolo =

- Location in Madagascar
- Coordinates: 19°11′00″S 48°53′44″E
- Country: Madagascar
- Region: Atsinanana
- District: Vatomandry (district)

Population (2019)Census
  - Total: 8,228
- Time zone: UTC3 (EAT)
- Postal code: 517

'Amboditavolo is a village and commune in the Vatomandry (district) in the Atsinanana Region, Madagascar.

It is located 30km north of Vatomandry. The municipality is crossed by the Ihefitra river.
