= Nierenana =

- Location in Madagascar
- Coordinates: 19°05′16″S 48°51′00″E
- Country: Madagascar
- Region: Atsinanana
- District: Vatomandry (district)

Population (2019)Census
  - Total: 3,637
- Time zone: UTC3 (EAT)

Nierenana is a rural municipality located in the Atsinanana region of eastern Madagascar. It is part of the Vatomandry (district).

== Economy ==
The economy is based on agriculture, including rice, maize and manioc.
