= Jonah Ranaivo =

Malagasy politician

Jonah Ranaivo (17 January 1908 - 18 April 1988) was a French Malagasy politician who represented French Madagascar in the National Assembly of France from 1951 to 1955.

== Biography ==
Ranaivo was born on 17 January 1908 in Vatomandry, French Madagascar. He served in the French National Assembly from 1951 to 1955 during the French Fourth Republic. Ranaivo died on 18 April 1988 in Aulnay-sous-Bois, France
