= Tanambao Vahatrakaka =

- Location in Madagascar
- Coordinates: 19°26′6″S 48°49′00″E
- Country: Madagascar
- Region: Atsinanana
- District: Vatomandry (district)

Population (2019)Census
  - Total: 9,038
- Time zone: UTC3 (EAT)

Tanambao Vahatrakaka is a rural municipality located in the Atsinanana region of eastern Madagascar, and belongs to the Vatomandry District.
