= Ambodivoananto =

- Location in Madagascar
- Coordinates: 19°11′00″S 48°47′00″E
- Country: Madagascar
- Region: Atsinanana
- District: Vatomandry (district)

Population (2019)Census
  - Total: 5,525
- Time zone: UTC3 (EAT)

Ambodivoananto is a village and commune in the Vatomandry (district) in the Atsinanana Region, Madagascar.
