= Ambalavolo =

- Location in Madagascar
- Coordinates: 19°30′16″S 48°48′00″E
- Country: Madagascar
- Region: Atsinanana
- District: Vatomandry (district)
- Elevation: 27 m (89 ft)

Population (2019)
  - Total: 10,204
- Time zone: UTC3 (EAT)
- postal code: 517

Ambalavolo is a rural commune located in the Atsinanana region of eastern Madagascar, and belongs to the Vatomandry (district).

The economy is based on agriculture, including coffee and cacao but also rice, mais and manioc are grown.
