= Antanambao Mahatsara =

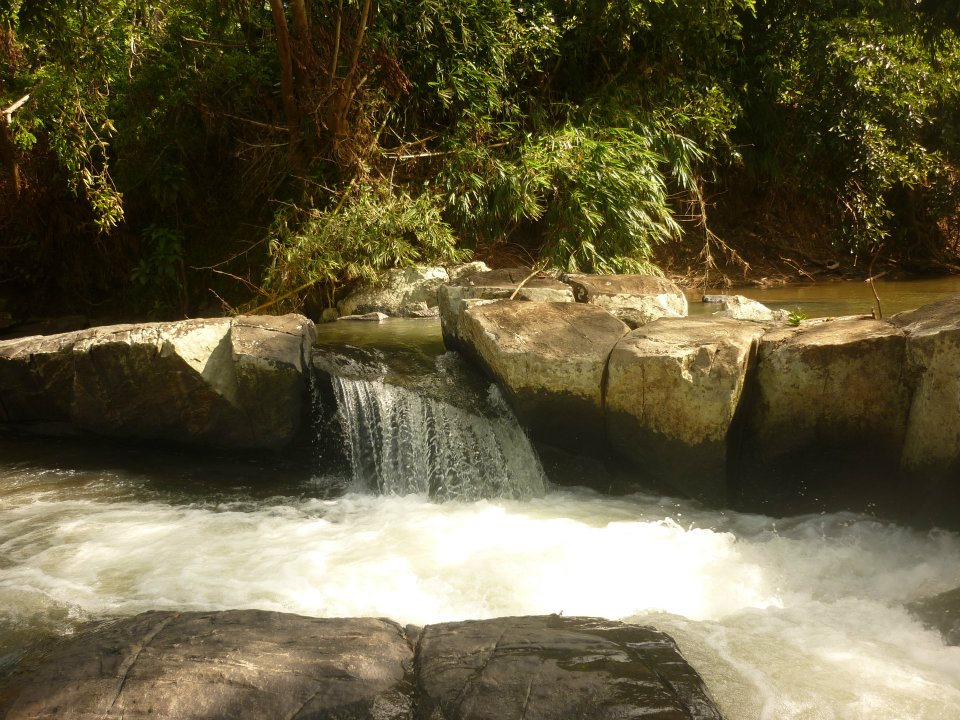
- small waterfall at Antanambao Mahatsara

- Location in Madagascar
- Coordinates: 19°19′00″S 48°47′00″E
- Country: Madagascar
- Region: Atsinanana
- District: Vatomandry (district)

Government
  - Mayor: Fidèle Manantsara

Population (2019)3rd census 2019
  - Total: 16,482
- Time zone: UTC3 (EAT)
- postal code: 517

Antanambao Mahatsara is a rural commune (municipality) located in the Atsinanana region of eastern Madagascar, and belongs to the Vatomandry (district).

Agriculture is the base of economy, including coffee and rice. Also mais and manioc are grown.
