= Ifasina I =

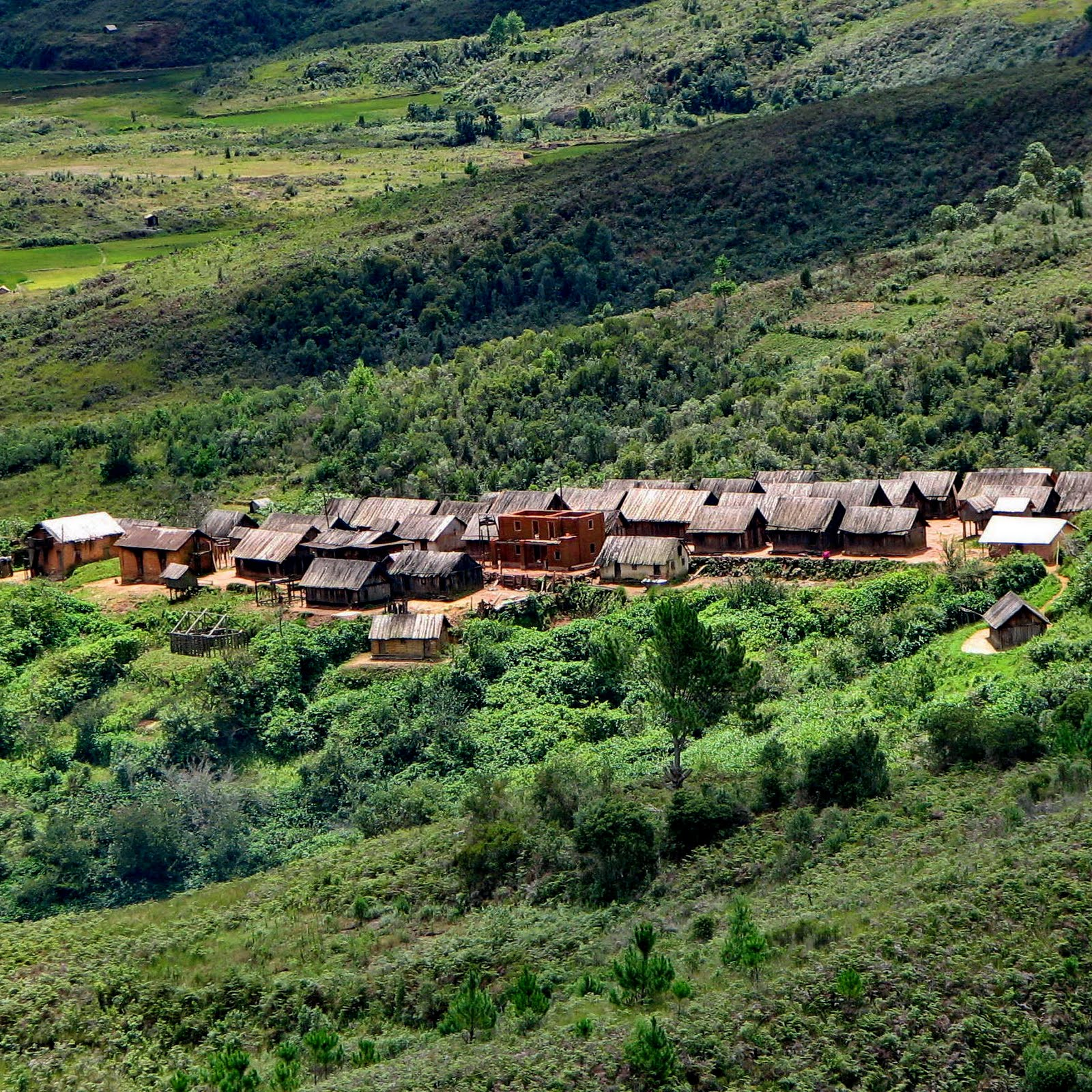
- Ifasina

- Location in Madagascar
- Coordinates: 19°25′17″S 48°41′12″E
- Country: Madagascar
- Region: Atsinanana
- District: Vatomandry District

Population (2019)Census
  - Total: 5,101
  - Ethnicities: Betsimisaraka
- Time zone: UTC3 (EAT)
- Postal code: 517

Ifasina I is a small village and commune in the Vatomandry District, in Atsinanana, Madagascar.

It is one of numerous lost towns on the eastern coast of Madagascar.
