= Sakanila River =

Location
- Country: Madagascar
- Region: Atsinanana

Physical characteristics
- Mouth
  - location: Maintinandry
  - coordinates: 19°25′48″S 48°55′51″E
  - elevation: 0 m (0 ft)

The Sakanila River is a river on the east coast of Madagascar, flowing into the Indian Ocean at Maintinandry, south of Vatomandry.

A bridge on Route nationale 11 (Madagascar) crosses the Sakanila west of Maintinandry.

The Madagascar Ethnobotany Program is located upriver at Ambalabe.
