= Mahanoro =

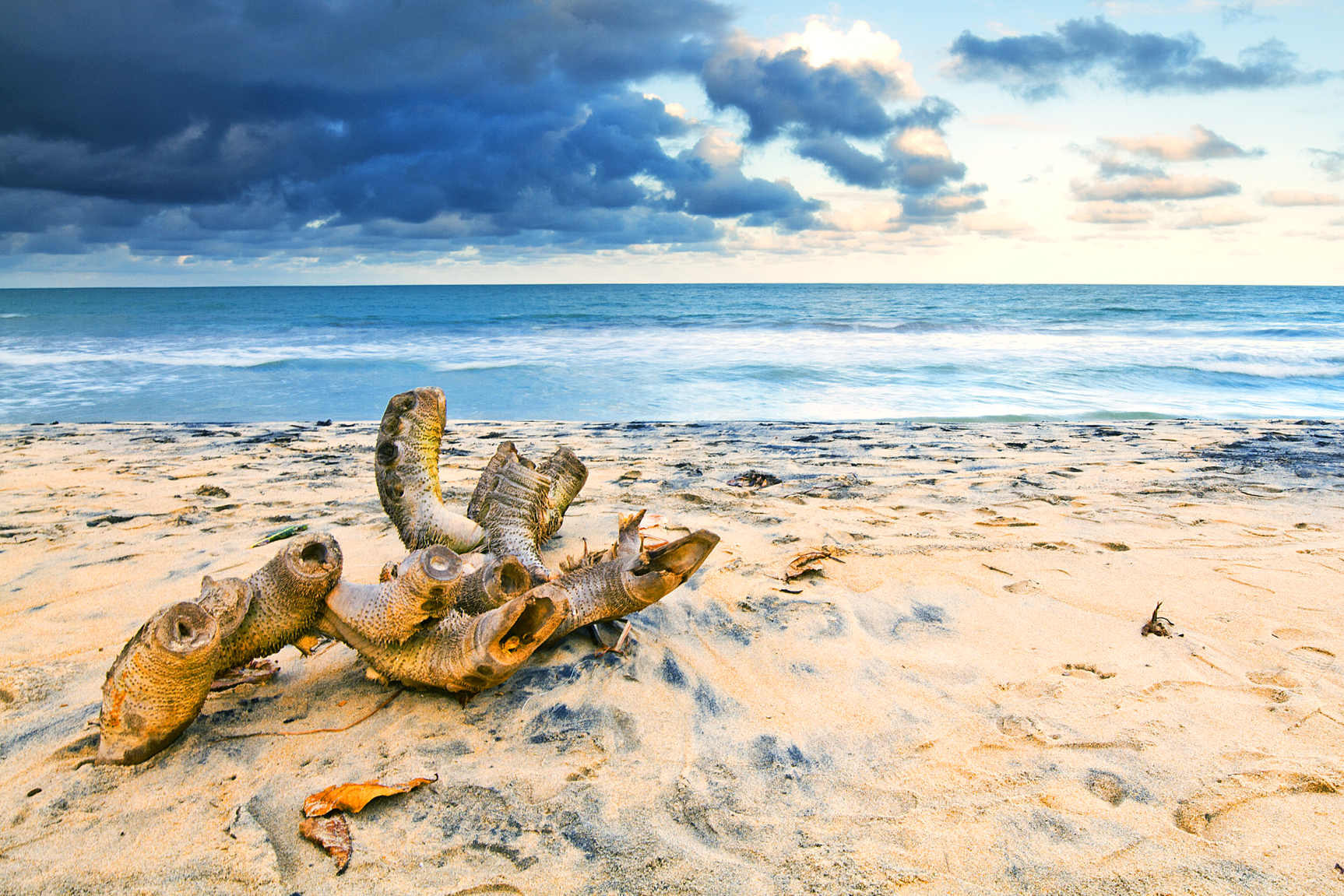
- beach of Mahanoro

- Location in Madagascar
- Coordinates: 19°54′S 48°48′E
- Country: Madagascar
- Region: Atsinanana
- District: Mahanoro District

Area
  - Total: 264.40 km^{2} (102.09 sq mi)

Population (2018)Census
  - Total: 37,800
- Time zone: UTC3 (EAT)
- Postal code: 510

Mahanoro is a rural municipality located in the Atsinanana region of eastern Madagascar, along the coast.

It is located 9 km north of the mouth of the Mangoro River. The Canal des Pangalanes is nearby, and the "Chutes de la Sahatsio" waterfalls are 18 km north of town. Though a small airport is situated on the north side of the town, the location is quite isolated and with limited tourism, though it is reported to have a single hotel.

There is a lighthouse on a cape just south of the town, constructed in 1936, and in poor repair.

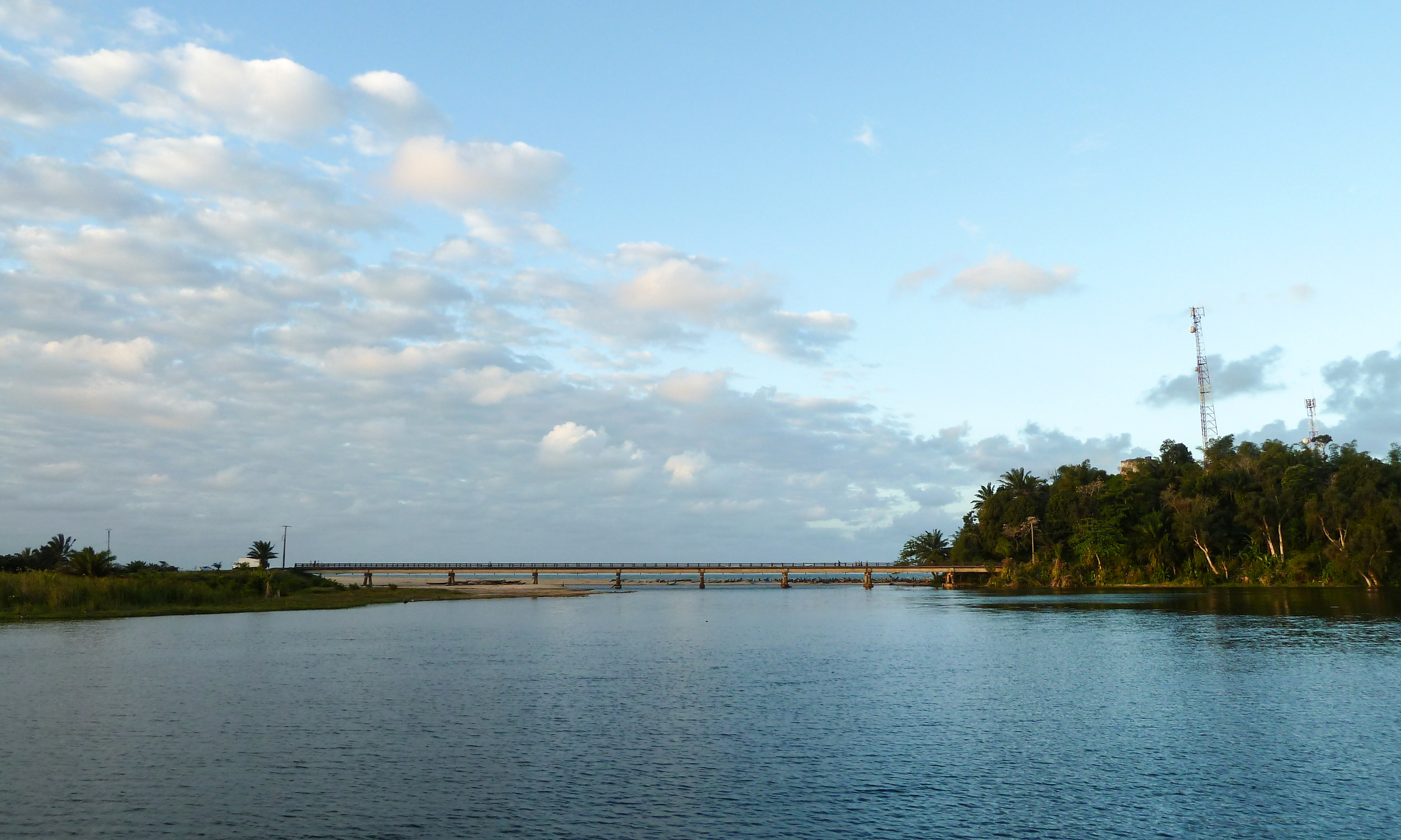
RN11 Bridge over the Canal des Pangalanes on the south side of Mahanoro, in 2013.

== Fokontany ==
21 fokontany (villages) belong to this municipality: Androhomanasa, Ambohimiarina, Maroahitra, Ambohitsara I, Ambilabe, Ambinanisasika, Bemangahazo, Ambodiriana Lohariana, Tandroroho, Miakara, Androrangambo, Maintimbato, Sahabe, Fiadanana, Vohitromby, Tanambao I, Ambalakininina, Ankadirano, Tanamborozano, Ambalamangahazo and Papagnambo.

== Roads ==
Only one road leads to Mahanoro: northswards to Toamasina the National road 11a and southwards to Nosy Varika and Mananjary by the National road 11.

== Climate ==
Climate data for Mahanoro (1991–2020)
Month	Jan	Feb	Mar	Apr	May	Jun	Jul	Aug	Sep	Oct	Nov	Dec	Year
Record high °C (°F)	34.9 (94.8)	34.6 (94.3)	34.0 (93.2)	32.6 (90.7)	34.3 (93.7)	30.4 (86.7)	30.3 (86.5)	29.1 (84.4)	30.0 (86.0)	32.0 (89.6)	33.2 (91.8)	34.4 (93.9)	34.9 (94.8)
Mean daily maximum °C (°F)	30.5 (86.9)	30.4 (86.7)	29.9 (85.8)	29.1 (84.4)	27.4 (81.3)	25.6 (78.1)	24.6 (76.3)	25.1 (77.2)	26.0 (78.8)	27.4 (81.3)	28.8 (83.8)	30.0 (86.0)	27.9 (82.2)
Daily mean °C (°F)	26.8 (80.2)	26.8 (80.2)	26.4 (79.5)	25.4 (77.7)	23.7 (74.7)	21.8 (71.2)	20.7 (69.3)	21.0 (69.8)	21.9 (71.4)	23.5 (74.3)	25.0 (77.0)	26.3 (79.3)	24.1 (75.4)
Mean daily minimum °C (°F)	23.0 (73.4)	23.2 (73.8)	22.9 (73.2)	21.6 (70.9)	20.0 (68.0)	17.9 (64.2)	16.9 (62.4)	16.9 (62.4)	17.7 (63.9)	19.6 (67.3)	21.1 (70.0)	22.5 (72.5)	20.3 (68.5)
Record low °C (°F)	18.4 (65.1)	19.7 (67.5)	18.7 (65.7)	16.8 (62.2)	13.0 (55.4)	13.5 (56.3)	11.2 (52.2)	11.0 (51.8)	11.9 (53.4)	13.0 (55.4)	13.0 (55.4)	17.4 (63.3)	11.0 (51.8)
Average precipitation mm (inches)	284.4 (11.20)	291.4 (11.47)	275.9 (10.86)	171.7 (6.76)	161.5 (6.36)	122.5 (4.82)	124.5 (4.90)	96.2 (3.79)	68.2 (2.69)	91.2 (3.59)	96.9 (3.81)	180.3 (7.10)	1,964.7 (77.35)
Average precipitation days (≥ 1.0 mm)	17.9	17.8	17.5	14.3	12.9	14.0	16.0	12.5	9.0	10.5	10.1	14.0	166.5
Source: NOAA
