= Cyclone Manou =

South-West Indian cyclone in 2003

Tropical Cyclone Manou
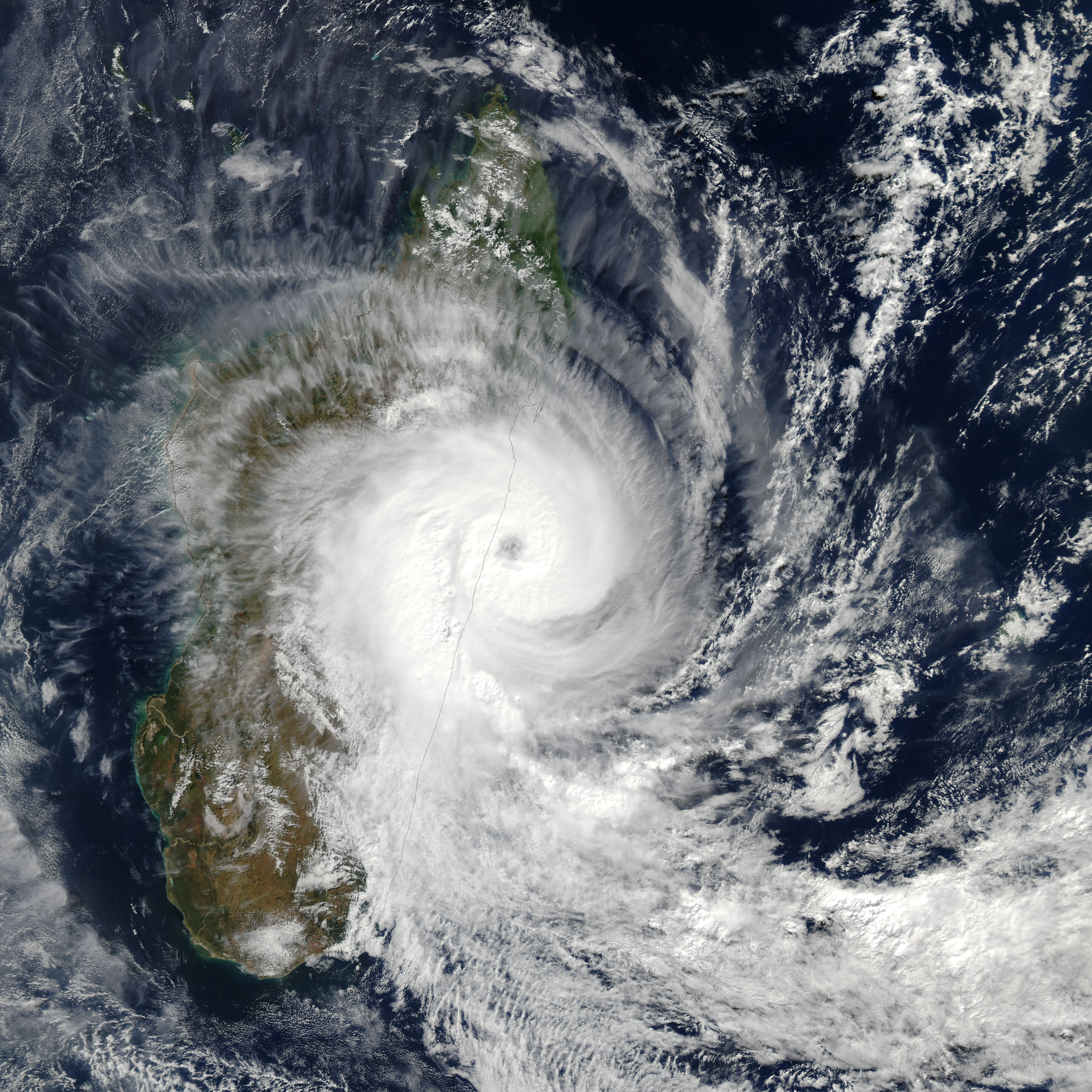
- Cyclone Manou near eastern Madagascar

Meteorological history
- Formed: May 2, 2003
- Dissipated: May 13, 2003

Tropical cyclone
- 10-minute sustained (MFR)
- Highest winds: 155 km/h (100 mph)
- Lowest pressure: 950 hPa (mbar); 28.05 inHg

Category 1-equivalent tropical cyclone
- 1-minute sustained (SSHWS/JTWC)
- Highest winds: 140 km/h (85 mph)
- Lowest pressure: 967 hPa (mbar); 28.56 inHg

Overall effects
- Fatalities: 89 total
- Damage: Unknown
- Areas affected: Mauritius, Madagascar
- IBTrACS
- Part of the 2002–03 South-West Indian Ocean cyclone season

Tropical Cyclone Manou was a relatively rare May tropical cyclone that affected southeastern Madagascar. The final named storm of the 2002–03 South-West Indian Ocean cyclone season, Manou formed on May 2 to the southwest of Diego Garcia. It moved generally to the southwest for much of its duration, steered by a ridge to the southeast. Manou affected Saint Brandon and Mauritius with gusty winds. After an initial strengthening phase, the storm weakened but later re-intensified as it approached Madagascar. Manou developed a well-defined eye and reached peak winds only 19 km (12 mi) from the eastern Madagascar coastline. For about 12 hours, the cyclone stalled before turning to the south and weakening. Manou became extratropical on May 10 and dissipated three days later.

Damage in Madagascar was heaviest near Vatomandry, where 85% of buildings were destroyed and 23 people were killed. Manou destroyed about 24,500 houses nationwide, leaving 114,480 people homeless. The storm destroyed large areas of crops and disrupted transportation, including damaging the road between Vatomandry and Brickaville. Manou injured 85 and killed 89 people throughout Madagascar.

== Meteorological history ==
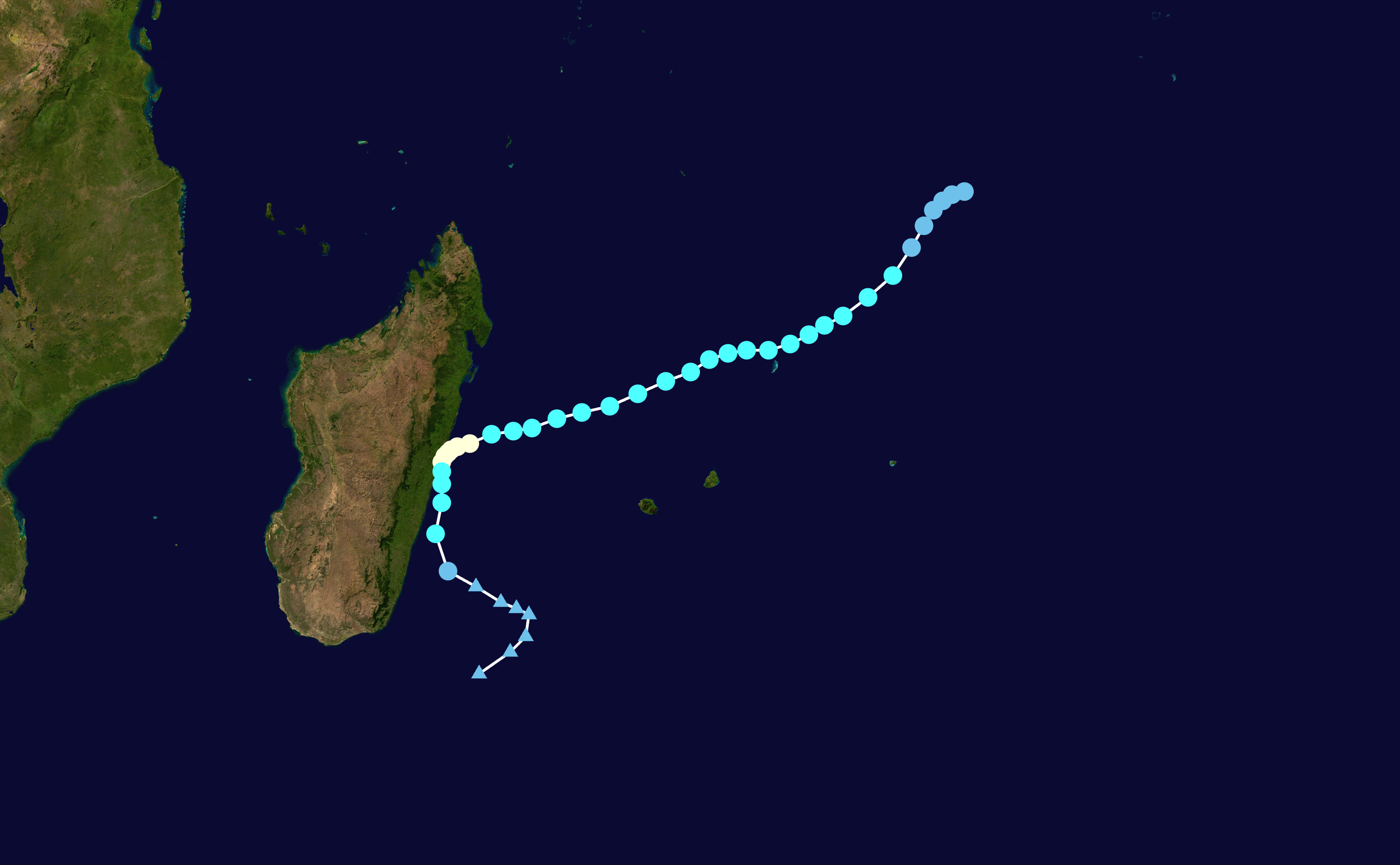
Map plotting the storm's track and intensity, according to the Saffir–Simpson scale Map key Saffir–Simpson scale Tropical depression (≤38 mph, ≤62 km/h) Tropical storm (39–73 mph, 63–118 km/h) Category 1 (74–95 mph, 119–153 km/h) Category 2 (96–110 mph, 154–177 km/h) Category 3 (111–129 mph, 178–208 km/h) Category 4 (130–156 mph, 209–251 km/h) Category 5 (≥157 mph, ≥252 km/h) Unknown Storm type Tropical cyclone Subtropical cyclone Extratropical cyclone, remnant low, tropical disturbance, or monsoon depression

In late April, an area of convection persisted southwest of Diego Garcia in the southern Indian Ocean. The system had a low-level circulation and pulsating thunderstorm activity. Located in an area of weak to moderate wind shear, the convection gradually organized while developing outflow. On May 2, a secondary area of convection, also with an accompanying circulation, formed to the northwest, and also showed signs of development. That day, the original disturbance organized enough for Météo-France (MFR) (Note: Météo-France is the official Regional Specialized Meteorological Center for the south-west Indian Ocean, based out of Réunion.) to designate it Tropical Disturbance 16 at 1200 UTC. The Joint Typhoon Warning Center (JTWC) issued tropical cyclone formation alerts for both systems within a 14‑hour period, and upgraded the original system to Tropical Cyclone 18S on May 3 about 980 km (610 mi) northeast of Mauritius. Due to the disturbance to the northwest, as well as a building ridge to the northeast, the system continued to the southwest. On May 4, MFR upgraded the disturbance to a tropical depression and later Tropical Storm Manou.

According to the JTWC, the storm quickly reached 1-minute sustained winds of 85 km/h (53 mph). The secondary disturbance to the west weakened while approaching the storm. Manou also weakened due to ongoing shear, and the windspeeds dropped as the circulation became exposed from the convection. On May 6, the storm re-intensified and the thunderstorms redeveloped while passing north of Mauritius and Réunion. On May 8 while approaching Madagascar, Manou developed an eye, and as a result, MFR upgraded it to tropical cyclone status, with 10-minute winds of 120 km/h (75 mph). The JTWC also upgraded the storm to the equivalent of a minimal hurricane. After becoming a tropical cyclone, Manou intensified further, although its forward motion slowed significantly. MFR estimated peak 10-minute winds of 155 km/h (96 mph) on May 8, and JTWC estimated peak 1-minute winds of 140 km/h (87 mph), with gusts to 165 km/h (103 mph). This made Manou a rare May tropical cyclone in the basin; only four other storms that formed in the south-west Indian Ocean in May reached winds of over 140 km/h (87 mph) since satellite coverage began, most recently Cyclone Kesiny in the previous year.

While maintaining its peak intensity and an eye 44 km (27 mi) in diameter, Manou reached a position only 19 km (12 mi) from the eastern Madagascar coastline. At that time, gale-force winds extended over 150 km (93 mi) from the center, and MFR estimated a minimum barometric pressure of 950 mbar (28 inHg). For about 12 hours, Manou drifted off the eastern coast of Madagascar before turning to the south, moving around a ridge to its east. Land interaction and drier air weakened the eye, and on May 9 the cyclone weakened to tropical storm status. The next day Manou weakened to a tropical depression, and the JTWC issued its last advisory. MFR continued tracking the storm until it dissipated on May 13.

== Impact and aftermath ==
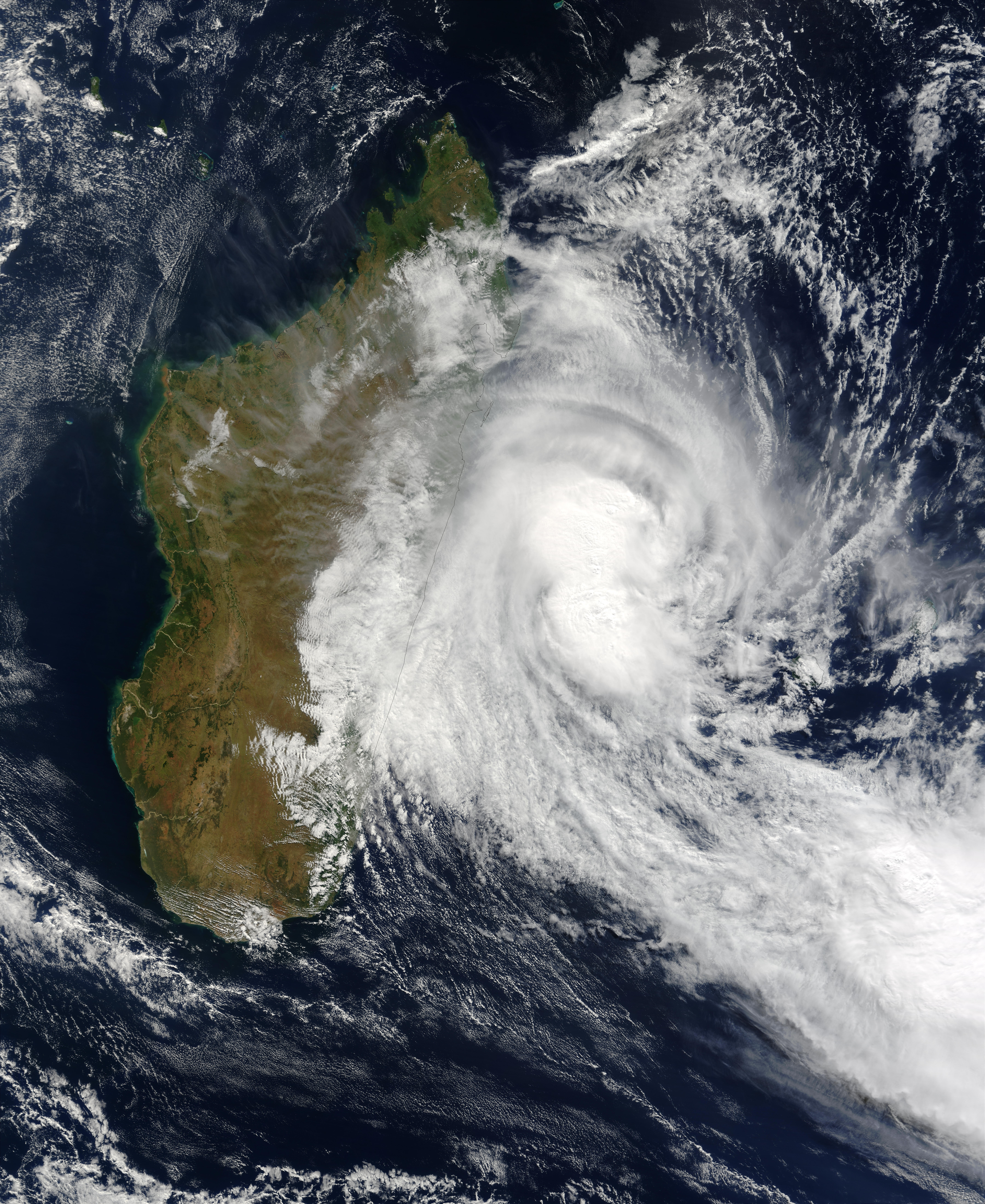
Cyclone Manou approaching Madagascar

Early in its duration, Manou passed just north of Saint Brandon. There, sustained winds reached 74 mph (46 mph), with gusts to 109 km/h (68 mph). On Mauritius, the storm produced gusty winds across much of the island, peaking at 107 km/h (66 mph).

Before affecting Madagascar, officials in the country advised residents to evacuate to shelters, although the storm was not expected to be as severe as it was. When Manou stalled just offshore eastern Madagascar, it produced gusts as strong as 211 km/h (131 mph) in Vatomandry. The same city reported 227 mm (8.9 in) of rainfall in a 15‑hour period. Damage was heaviest in Vatomandry, where 85% of buildings were destroyed, although the broader region also experienced severe damage and was largely isolated from the rest of the country. In Vatomandry, Manou severely damaged the main hospital, several schools, and the prison. The storm disrupted power and water networks. Strong winds blowing salt spray destroyed the coffee and cloves crops, and rice crops were also damaged, after 80% of rice fields were flooded in Brickaville and Andevoranto. In those two towns, an official estimated that 95% of houses were wrecked. The road between Vatomandry and Brickaville was washed out or otherwise blocked by landslides, and the village of Ilaka was isolated after the storm wrecked a bridge. Throughout Madagascar, Manou injured 85 and killed 89 people, including 23 people in Vatomandry and 2 in Brickaville. About 24,500 houses were destroyed, leaving 114,480 people homeless.

On May 12, Malagasy Prime Minister Jacques Sylla issued an appeal to the international community for assistance. Due to the damage from Manou, the French Red Cross activated its office in Réunion, providing one ton of medicine. The Malagasy Red Cross had pre-positioned emergency supplies earlier in the cyclone season, and after Manou struck, the agency distributed a water purification unit, medicine, and tents to the affected areas. Due to road damage, supplies had to be delivered by boat, which arrived in Vatomandry on May 13. The delivery included 4,500 kg (9,900 lb) of supplies. Workers quickly made repairs to power systems. The Malagasy government provided $147,000 (Note: All dollar amounts are reported in 2003 United States dollars.) to restore health centers in Vatomandry and Andevoranto. Japan provided $80,000 worth of supplies, including tents and jerrycans. Japan, the United States, Norway, and Germany donated about $1.27 million to Madagascar for relief. The World Food Programme initially provided 90 tons of rice, although ongoing drought conditions and storms caused the agency to continue providing food to residents in southern Madagascar for several months.

== See also ==
- Tropical cyclones in 2003
- Weather of 2003
- Cyclone Indlala – deadly storm in 2007 that struck northeastern Madagascar
- Tropical Storm Hubert – deadly storm in 2010 that struck eastern Madagascar
- Cyclone Emnati – made landfall at a similar intensity
