= Route nationale 11a (Madagascar) =

Road in Madagascar

Location
- Country: Madagascar

Highway system
- Roads in Madagascar

Route nationale 11a (RN 11a) is a secondary highway in Madagascar of 204 km, running from Antsampanana to Mahanoro, to the Mangoro River. It crosses the region of Atsinanana.

== Selected locations on route ==
(north to south)

- Antsampanana junction with RN2
- Vatomandry
- Mahanoro – 238 km

It continues as RN 11 from Mahanoro - Nosy Varika - 204 km - Mananjary

== See also ==
- List of roads in Madagascar
- Transport in Madagascar
