= Canal des Pangalanes =

Canal in Madagascar

Coordinates: 22°48′S 47°50′E

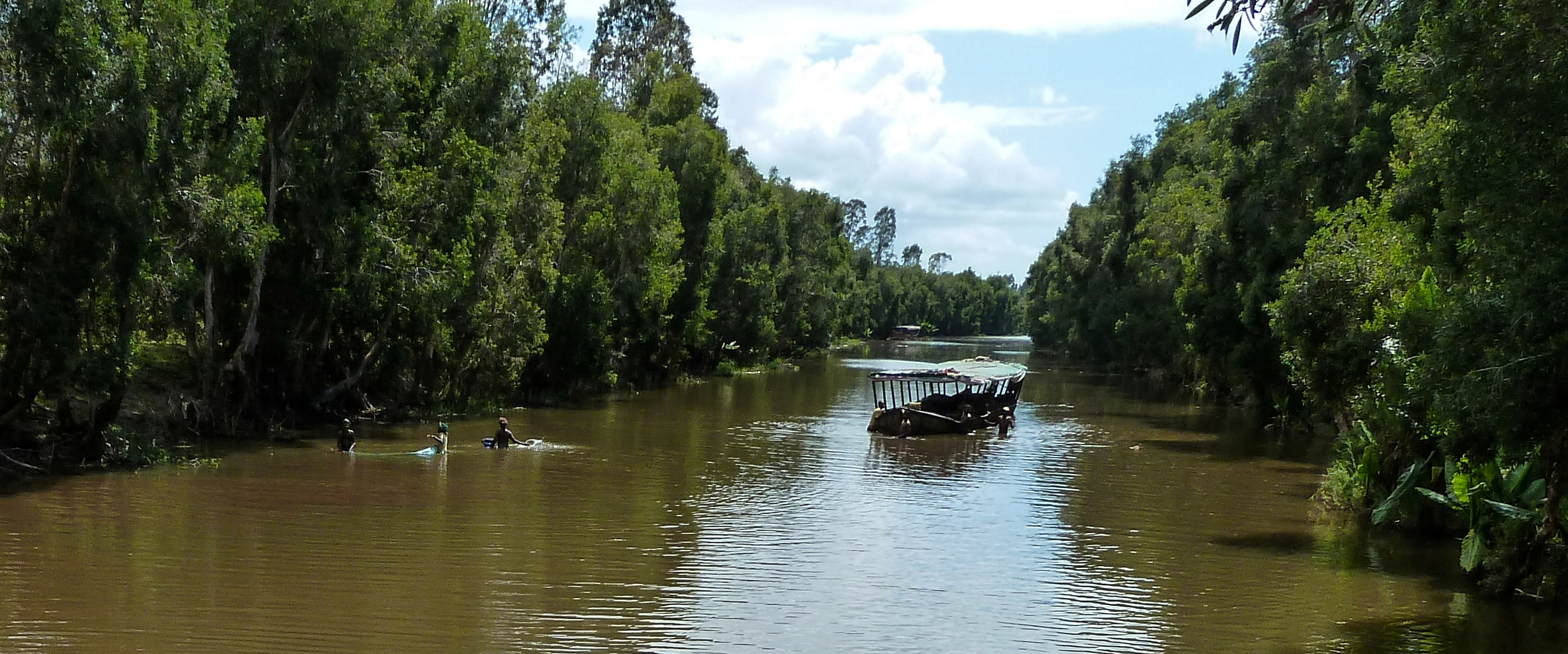
Canal des Pangalanes between Nosy Varika and Mahanoro

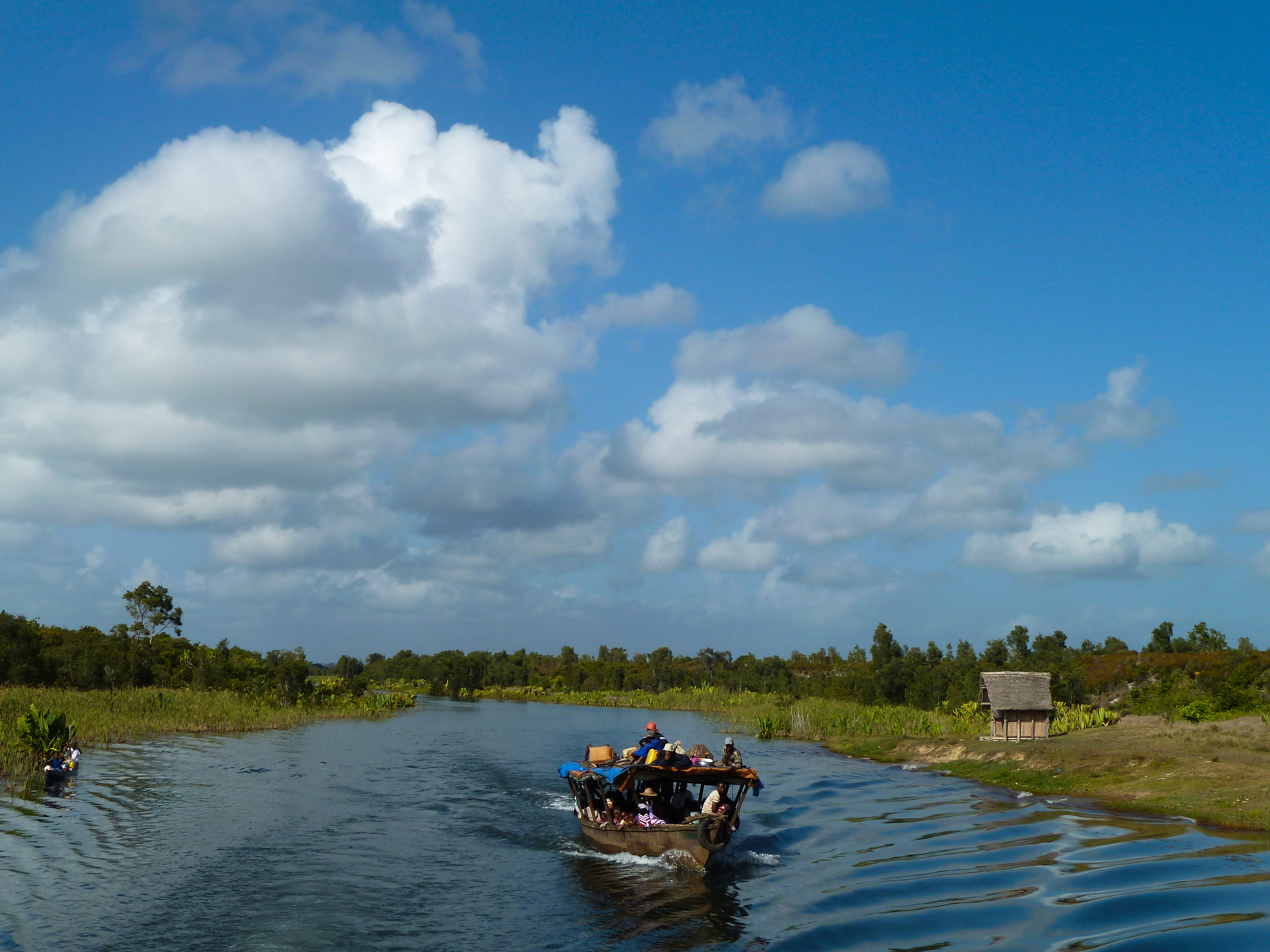
The canal between Mananjary and Nosy Varika

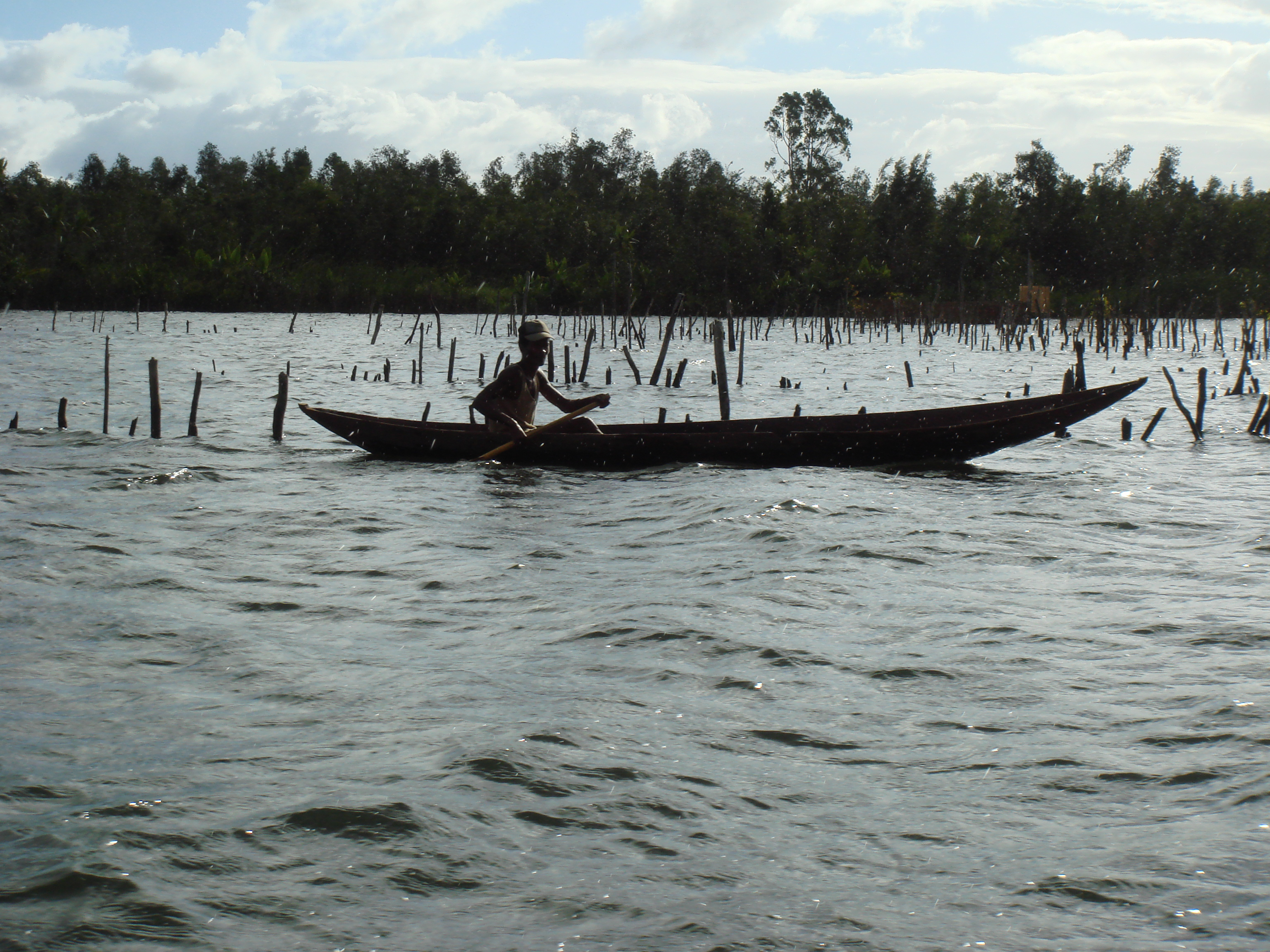
A man in a canoe on the canal

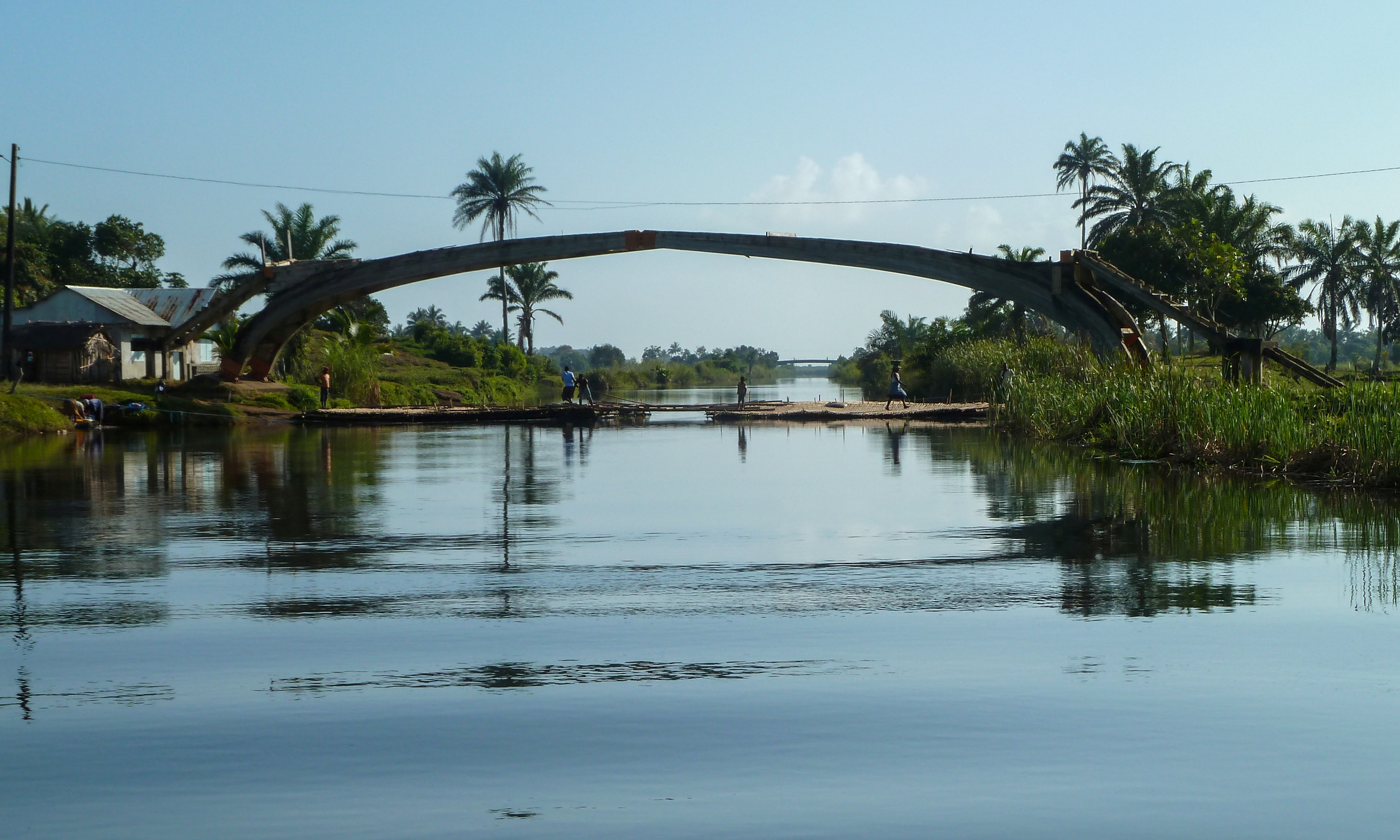
An inoperative bridge on the canal in Mananjary, which was damaged by a typhoon. Underneath it, a makeshift bamboo bridge was built, which is removed for passing ships upon payment of a fee.

The Canal des Pangalanes is a canal that consists of a series of natural rivers, waterways and human-made lakes that extends for over 654 kilometres (410 mi) and runs down the east coast of Madagascar from Toamasina to Farafangana. It is used primarily for transportation and fishing, and it has unspoiled natural beaches that are visited by tourists. An initial area of the canal in Toamasina (in French: Tamatave) is straight, while subsequent areas have curves, lagoons, connected lakes and swamps.

== Construction ==
Initial construction of the canal was undertaken by France under gouverneur Joseph Gallieni during the French colonial period between 1896 and 1904 to increase trade, provide a means to supply troops that were located inland, and to provide a safe route for cargo boats destined for Toamasina compared to traveling along the coast of the Indian Ocean. By 1901, an uninterrupted canal existed between Toamasina and Andevoranto, which extended 95 kilometres (60 mi).

Additional construction from 1949 to 1957, cost over 800 million CFA francs to complete. Part of this project included the 570 million CFA franc construction of a river port at Toamasina and improvements to the canal for 30 kilometres (20 mi) from Toamasina to south of Ivondro, which was completed in 1953.

Further work after World War II enabled 30-ton barges to travel between Tamatave and Vatomandry, a distance of 160 kilometres (100 mi).

== Use ==
Canal des Pangalanes is used by local people: Some of them use canoes for travel and make their homes along its banks. Ferries run up and down navigable areas transporting items such as wood, charcoal, dried fish and other produce. Many local people rely upon the canal for and, for some of them, it is their only means of travel. The canal provides fish for the locals, and cassava is grown along its banks. Coffee factories exist along the canal. Some areas have white, sandy beaches.

A floating museum comprising a library was established in 1999 with the University of Toamasina and the University of Fianarantsoa with the collaboration of the University of Madagascar's Museum of Art and Archaeology operated by the University of Antananarivo.

== 1980s renovations ==
After use of the canal decreased, a large project in the 1980s restored and renovated it. The rehabilitation project included dredging areas overrun with silt, the operation of a cargo service enabled by the purchase of a fleet of tug barges, and the construction of warehouses. By 2011 the tug barges were observed to be no longer in use and the warehouses were empty. The tug barges are stored near the pier in Toamasina, where they are rotting. Still, 400 km had been renovated for the transport of goods & passagers.

== Pollution ==
An oil refinery south of Toamasina contributed to pollution in that area of the canal, as evidenced by hyacinths covered with grey-colored slime.

== See also ==
- Lists of canals
