= Vatomandry =

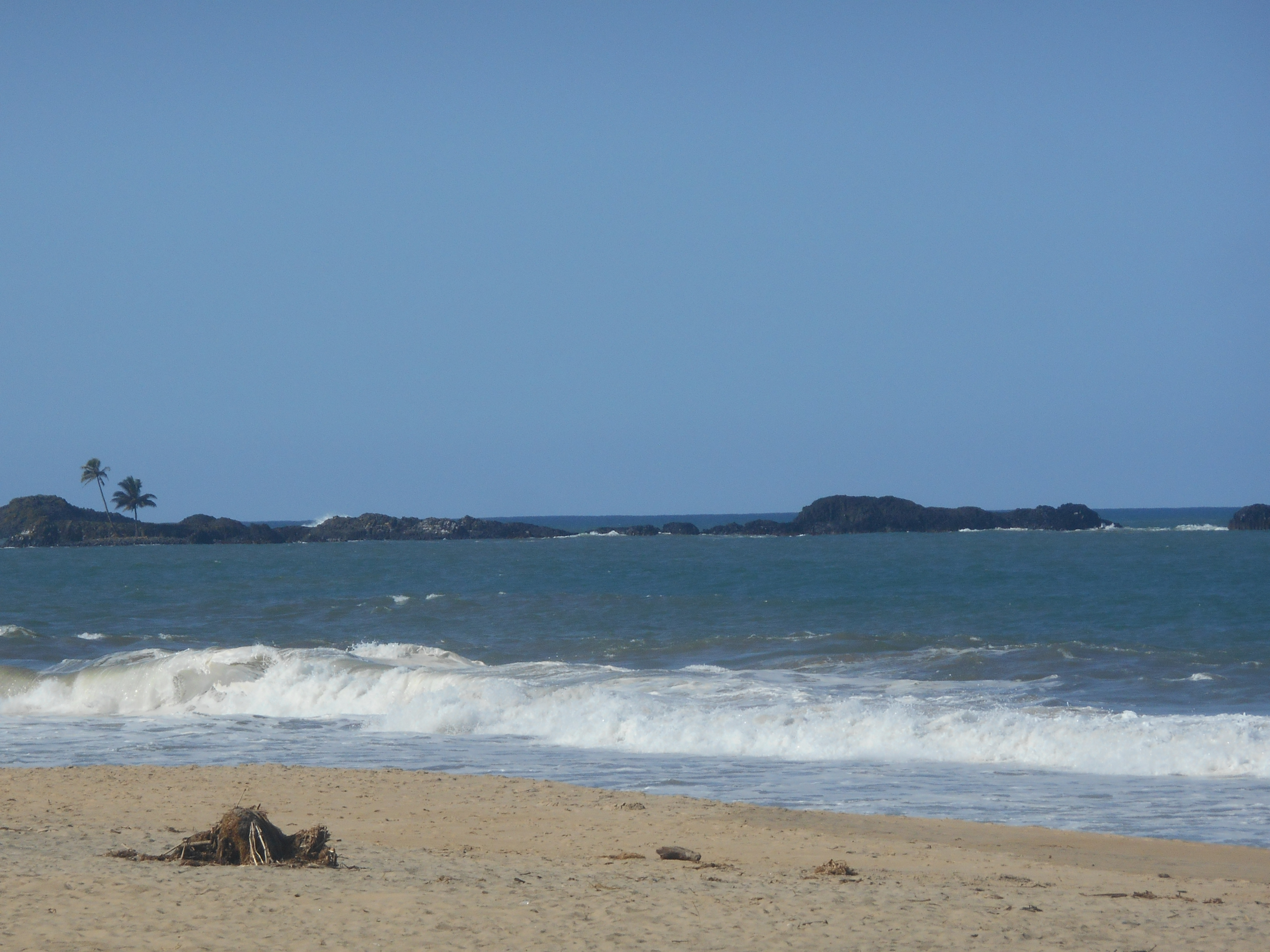
- Beach of Vatomandry

- Location in Madagascar
- Coordinates: 19°19′51″S 48°58′41″E
- Country: Madagascar
- Region: Atsinanana
- District: Vatomandry District

Population (2019 census)
  - Total: 15,836
  - Ethnicities: Betsimisaraka
- Time zone: UTC+3 (EAT)
- postal code: 517

Vatomandry ([vatʷˈmanɖʐʲ]) is a town in and the administrative center of the Vatomandry District, Atsinanana Region, Madagascar. An airport serves the city.

== Etymology and location ==
Located on the coast, the town's name means 'Sleeping Rocks', derived from two black rocks near the shore. It is also on the path of the Canal des Pangalanes and National Road RN 11a

== History ==
In the pre-colonial era of the 19th century, Vatomandry was a center of Hova government with an active port.

Cyclone Manou caused great damage in 2003 to the town and left 68 people dead. Cyclone Giovanna in 2012 also caused significant damage.

== Religion ==
- Roman Catholic Apostolic Prefecture of Vatomandry

== Notable personalities ==
- Didier Ratsiraka (1936–2021), former President of Madagascar
- Jonah Ranaivo (1908-1988), politician
